= Francine Bergé =

French actress (born 1938)

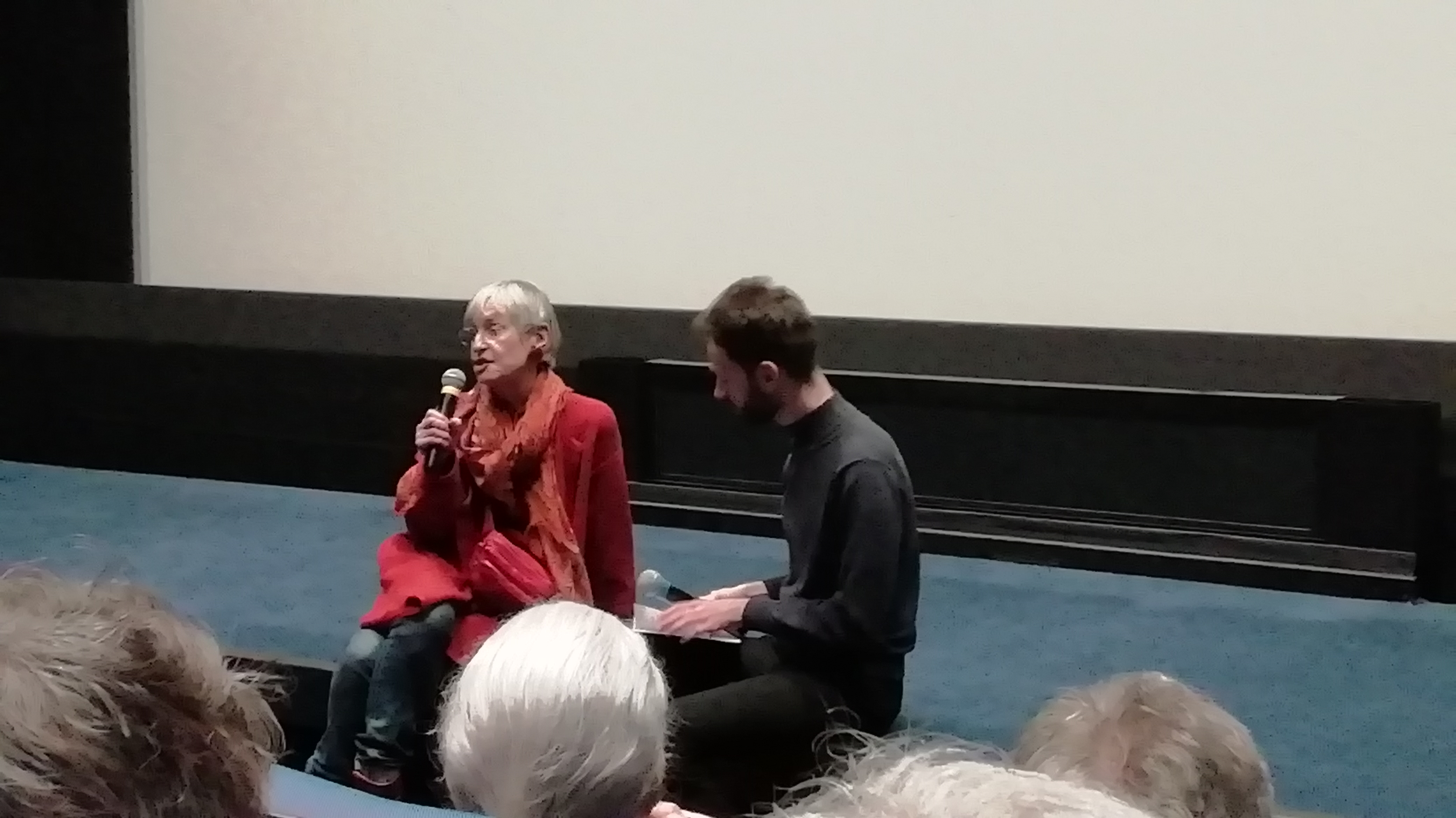
- Born: 21 July 1938 (age 88); Neuilly-sur-Seine, Hauts-de-Seine, France
- Education: French National Academy of Dramatic Arts
- Occupations: Film and stage actress
- Years active: 1956 - present

Francine Bergé (born 21 July 1938, Neuilly-sur-Seine, Hauts-de-Seine, France) is a French film and stage actress.

== Filmography ==
Year	Title	Role	Director	Notes
1956	Elena and Her Men	A maid	Jean Renoir	Uncredited
1962	Othello	Desdemona	Claude Barma	TV movie
1962	La caméra explore le temps	Marie de Gonzague	Guy Lessertisseur	TV series (1 episode)
1963	Les Abysses	Michelle	Nikos Papatakis	
1963	Judex	Diana Monti	Georges Franju	
1964	Circle of Love	Maximilienne de Poussy	Roger Vadim	
1965	Gaspard des montagnes	Anne-Marie	Jean-Pierre Decourt	TV movie
1965	Rocambole	The beautiful gardener	Jean-Pierre Decourt	TV series (1 episode)
1966	The Nun	Sister Sainte-Christine	Jacques Rivette	
1966	Il faut que je tue Monsieur Rumann		Guy Casaril	TV movie
1968	Benjamin	Marion	Michel Deville	
1968	La cage de Pierre	Narrator	Pierre Zucca	Short
1969	Catherine, il suffit d'un amour	Sarah	Bernard Borderie	
1969	Bruno, l'enfant du dimanche	The maid	Louis Grospierre	
1971	Le misanthrope	Arsinoé	Pierre Dux	TV movie
1971	Mesure pour mesure	Isabelle	Marcel Bluwal	TV movie
1972	Paulina 1880	Monica Dadi	Jean-Louis Bertucelli	
1972	Pic et pic et colegram		Rachel Weinberg	
1973	La barque sans pêcheur	Henriette	Aldo Altit	TV mini-series
1974	Madame Baptiste	The mother	Claude Santelli	TV movie
1975	Plus amer que la mort	Simone Fargeau	Michel Wyn	TV movie
1976	Monsieur Klein	Nicole	Joseph Losey	
1976	Un bail pour l'éternité	Françoise	Yves-André Hubert	TV movie
1977-1990	Cinéma 16	Various	Nina Companeez, Georges Franju, ...	TV series (7 episodes)
1978	A Simple Story	Francine	Claude Sautet	
1978	Lulu	Countess Geschwitz	Marcel Bluwal	TV movie
1978	Allégra	Paule	Michel Wyn	TV movie
1978	Un ours pas comme les autres	Joséphine	Nina Companeez	TV mini-series
1978	Les dossiers de l'écran	Agnès Sorel	Alexandre Astruc	TV series (1 episode)
1979	The Medic	Marcia	Pierre Granier-Deferre	
1979	Les amours de la belle époque	The Marquise	Agnès Delarive	TV series (1 episode)
1980	La mort en sautoir	Mascha	Pierre Goutas	TV movie
1981	Aimée	Rose	Joël Farges	
1981	Carte Vermeil	Madame de Saint-Hillaire	Alain Levent	TV movie
1981	Le mariage de Figaro	The Countess	Pierre Badel	TV movie
1981	Salut champion	Annie	Victor Vicas	TV series (1 episode)
1982	Emmenez-moi au théâtre	Natacha	Alain Boudet	TV series (1 episode)
1983	Life Is a Bed of Roses	Young Lady	Alain Resnais	
1985	Les bonnes	Solange	Michel Dumoulin	TV movie
1985	Les Cinq Dernières Minutes		Jacques Audoir	TV series (1 episode)
1988	L'affaire Saint-Romans		Michel Wyn	TV mini-series
1988	Les Cinq Dernières Minutes	Jeanne Courtelin	Jean-Pierre Desagnat	TV series (1 episode)
1989	The Hitchhiker	Vivienne	Roger Andrieux	TV series (1 episode)
1993	Un crime	Madame Dunand	Jacques Deray	
1993	La voyageuse du soir	Madame Armelle	Igaal Niddam	TV movie
1993	Ferbac	The substitute Lafarge	Bruno Gantillon	TV series (1 episode)
1994	Du fond du coeur		Jacques Doillon	
1994	Commissaire Chabert : Mort d'une fugitive		Bruno Gantillon	TV movie
1996	Médée	Médée	Pierre Jourdan	TV movie
1997	Seventh Heaven	Mathilde's mother	Benoît Jacquot	
1998	Vigo	Mama Lozinska	Julien Temple	
1998	Un cadeau, la vie !	Thérèse Boivin	Jacob Berger	TV movie
1999	Kennedy et moi	Lydia Brentano	Sam Karmann	
1999	Inséparables	Lulu Nicoletti	Michel Couvelard	
2000	The Crimson Rivers	Headmistress	Mathieu Kassovitz	
2000	Confort moderne	The mother	Dominique Choisy	
2000	Toute la ville en parle	Hélène Verdier	Marc Rivière	TV movie
2000	L'enchanteur	Suzanne	Bénédicte Brunet	TV movie
2001	Wild Innocence	Marie-Thérèse's mother	Philippe Garrel	
2001	Les enquêtes d'Éloïse Rome	Luce Paquelier	Denys Granier-Deferre	TV series (1 episode)
2002	Si j'étais lui	Madame Fontana	Philippe Triboit	TV movie
2002	Famille d'accueil	Madeleine	Daniel Janneau	TV series (1 episode)
2003	Précipitations		Michel Tavarès	Short
2004	À ton image	Mathilde's mother	Aruna Villiers	
2004	Le choix de Macha	Anne-Marie	Marianne Lamour	TV movie
2005	Clara Sheller	Danièle	Renaud Bertrand	TV series (6 episodes)
2006	Avocats & associés	Nadège Fougerolles	Denis Malleval	TV series (1 episode)
2007	Fabien Cosma	Madame Baudrier	Bruno Gantillon	TV series (1 episode)
2009	Un petit mensonge	Marie-Françoise	Denis Malleval	TV movie
2009	Sœur Thérèse.com	The reverend	Vincenzo Marano	TV series (1 episode)
2010	Si les papillons parlaient	Nina	Stefan Libiot	
2011	Cendre		Pierre Alfred Eberhard	Short
2011	Amoureuse	Luisa	Nicolas Herdt	TV movie
2013	Il faut marier maman	Violette	Jérôme Navarro	TV movie
2017	Number One	Adrienne Postel-Devaux	Tonie Marshall	
2023	The Plough		Philippe Garrel	

== Theater ==
Year	Title	Author	Director	Notes
1956	Othello	William Shakespeare	René Dupuy	
1956	Richard II	William Shakespeare	René Dupuy	
1957	The Satin Slipper	Paul Claudel	Jean-Louis Barrault	
1957	Pericles, Prince of Tyre	William Shakespeare	René Dupuy	
1958	Échec à la reine	Andrée Chedid	Jean-Daniel Laval	
1958	Tchekhov Tchekhova	François Nocher	François Nocher	
1959	Phèdre	Jean Racine	Jean Meyer	
1959	Je vivrai un grand amour	Steve Passeur	René Clermont	
1959	Le Prince de Papier	Jean Davray	Jacques Charon	
1961	Antigone	Jean Anouilh	André Barsacq	
1961	Liliom	Ferenc Molnár	Jean-Pierre Grenier	
1961	Hamlet	William Shakespeare	Jean Darnel	
1961	L'Hurluberlu	Jean Anouilh	Roland Piétri	
1962	Les Femmes Savantes	Molière	Jean Meyer	
1962	Amphitryon	Molière	Jean Meyer	
1963	Dom Juan	Molière	Jean Meyer	
1963	The Lady's Not for Burning	Christopher Fry	Pierre Franck	
1964	The Misunderstanding	Albert Camus	Michel Vitold	
1966	Berenice	Jean Racine	Roger Planchon	Prix du Syndicat de la critique - Best Actress
1966-1967	Richard III	William Shakespeare	Roger Planchon	
1967	Château en Suède	Françoise Sagan	André Barsacq	
1969	Dear Antoine: or, the Love That Failed	Jean Anouilh	Jean Anouilh & Roland Piétri	
1971	Electra	Jean Giraudoux	Andreas Voutsinas	
1972	Tu étais si gentil quand tu étais petit	Jean Anouilh	Jean Anouilh & Roland Piétri	
1973	Phèdre	Jean Racine	Antoine Bourseiller	
1973	Le Voyageur sans bagage	Jean Anouilh	Nicole Anouilh	
1974	La Poupée	Jacques Audiberti	Bernard Ballet & Marcel Maréchal	
1974	Hölderlin	Peter Weiss	Bernard Ballet & Marcel Maréchal	
1975	Hôtel du Lac	François-Marie Banier	Andreas Voutsinas	
1976	The Chalk Garden	Enid Bagnold	Raymond Gérôme	
1977-1978	Romeo and Juliet	William Shakespeare	Denis Llorca	
1979	The Imaginary Invalid	Molière	Marcel Maréchal	
1980	The Marriage of Figaro	Pierre Beaumarchais	Françoise Petit & Maurice Vaudaux	
1980	Le Fleuve rouge	Pierre Laville	Marcel Maréchal	
1982	The Three Musketeers	Alexandre Dumas	Marcel Maréchal	
1983	Entre la raison et le désir... Trois tragédies de Racine	Jean Racine	Anne Delbée	
1984	Der Rosenkavalier	Hugo von Hofmannsthal	Jean-Louis Thamin	
1988	Le Véritable Saint-Genest, comédien et martyr	Jean de Rotrou	André Steiger	
1989	Medea	Euripides	Dominique Quéhec	
1989	Mobie-Diq	Marie Redonnet	Alain Françon	
1989	La mer est trop loin	Jean-Gabriel Nordmann	Robert Cantarella	
1990	When We Dead Awaken	Henrik Ibsen	Kjetil Bang-Hansen	
1990	Rencontre	Péter Nádas	Alain Timar	
1991	Summer	Edward Bond	René Loyon	
1991	Agesilan De Colchos	Jean de Rotrou	Philippe Berling	
1993	Atget et Bérénice	Michèle Fabien	Marc Liebens	
1995	Golden Joe	Éric-Emmanuel Schmitt	Gérard Vergez	
1998	Quartet	Heiner Müller	Marie-Noëlle Rio	
2000	Hôtel des deux mondes	Éric-Emmanuel Schmitt	Daniel Roussel	
2000	Ein Fest für Boris	Thomas Bernhard	Jacques Kraemer	
2002	Prodigy	Nancy Huston	Gabriel Garran	
2002	Jeux de scène	Victor Haïm	Marcel Bluwal	Nominated - Molière Award for Best Actress
2003	Der Silbersee	Georg Kaiser & Kurt Weill	Olivier Desbordes	
2006	Bobby Fisher bor i Pasadena	Lars Norén	Renaud Marie Leblanc	
2006-2007	The Marquise of O	Heinrich von Kleist	Lukas Hemleb	
2009	Phèdre	Jean Racine	Renaud Marie Leblanc	
2009	Gertrude – The Cry	Howard Barker	Giorgio Barberio Corsetti	
2011	Le Nombril	Jean Anouilh	Michel Fagadau	
2013	The Misunderstanding	Albert Camus	Olivier Desbordes	
2013	Le prix des boîtes	Frédéric Pommier	Jorge Lavelli	
2015-2016	Bettencourt Boulevard	Michel Vinaver	Christian Schiaretti	Nominated - Molière Award for Best Actress
2018	L’échange	Paul Claudel	Christian Schiaretti	

== Awards ==
- 2018 - Prix du Brigadier d’honneur
- 2016 - Molière Award, Best Actress in a Public Theatre, for Bettencourt boulevard
- 2013 - Palmarès du théâtre, Honorary Award
- 2003 - Molière Award - Nominated for Best Actress for Jeux de scène
- 1970 - Prix du Syndicat de la critique, Best Actress for Bérénice
