= Steve Passeur =

French dramatist and screenwriter (1899–1966

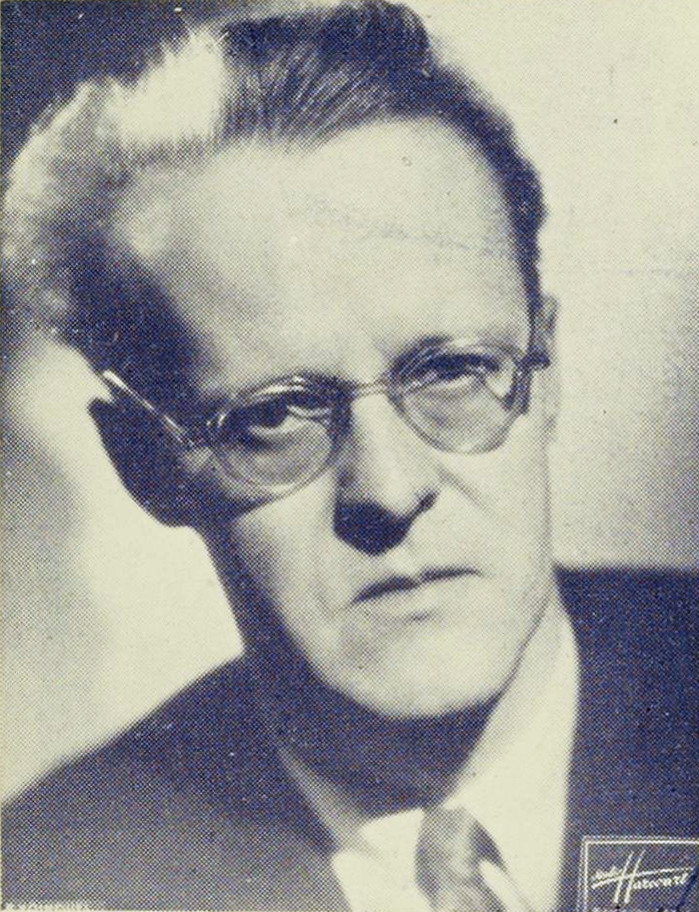
- Born: Étienne Morin; 24 September 1899; Sedan (Ardennes), France
- Died: 12 October 1966 (aged 67); Paris, France
- Occupations: Dramatist and playwright; screenwriter
- Spouse: Renée Passeur

Steve Passeur (24 September 1899 – 12 October 1966), pen name of Étienne Morin, was a French dramatist and screenwriter. His plays with scathing replies often depicted cynical characters.

Prior to 1940, Passeur was considered as a writer of the avant-garde, whose works were staged and played by Louis Jouvet, Charles Dullin, Georges and Ludmilla Pitoëff.

He was married to the comedian Renée Passeur.

== Theatre ==
Dramatist

- 1925: La Maison ouverte, three-act play
- 1925: La Traversée de Paris à la nage, Paris, Maison de l'Œuvre
- 1925: Un bout de fil coupé en deux
- 1927: Pas encore, Paris, Atelier
- 1927: Le Nord-Sud de 10h12
- 1928: À quoi penses-tu ?, Atelier
- 1928: Le Refuge du prophète
- 1928: Tranquillité
- 1929: Suzanne, 3 acts comedy, mise-en-scène Louis Jouvet, Comédie des Champs-Élysées
- 1930: L'Acheteuse
- 1931: La Chaine, three-act play
- 1931: Défense d'afficher
- 1932: Les Tricheurs, three-act play, Théâtre de l'Atelier
- 1933: Une vilaine femme, three-act play, Théâtre de l'Œuvre
- 1933: Quand le vin est tiré
- 1934: L'Amour gai, three-act comedy play
- 1935: Je vivrai un grand amour
- 1935: Dieu sait pourquoi
- 1935: Le pavillon brûle
- 1936: Le Témoin, three-act play
- 1936: Un train à prendre
- 1937: Le Château de cartes
- 1937: La Pêche aux flambeaux
- 1939: Réflexion faite
- 1941: Le Paradis perdu
- 1941: Marché noir
- 1946: La Traitresse
- 1947: Le Vin du souvenir, Studio des Champs-Elysées
- 1947: Je vivrai un grand amour three-act play, Théâtre des Mathurins
- 1948: 107', three-act comedy play, Bruxelles, Palais des beaux-arts
- 1952: Une vilaine femme, Paris, Théâtre de l'Œuvre
- 1954: N'importe quoi pour elle, three-act play, mise-en-scène Georges Douking, Théâtre Gramont
- 1968: La Moitié du plaisir de Steve Passeur, Jean Serge, Robert Chazal, direction Robert Hossein, Théâtre Antoine, Théâtre des Variétés

== Filmography ==
Screenwriter and dialoguist

- 1932: Suzanne, by Léo Joannon and Raymond Rouleau
- 1932: Panurge by Michel Bernheim
- 1936: Port Arthur, by Nicolas Farkas
- 1936: Nitchevo, by Jacques de Baroncelli
- 1937: Feu! by Jacques de Baroncelli
- 1937: Beethoven's Great Love, by Abel Gance
- 1938: J'accuse!, by Abel Gance
- 1938: La Tragédie impériale, by Marcel L'Herbier
- 1939: Entente cordiale, by Marcel L'Herbier
- 1939: Louise, by Abel Gance
- 1939: The White Slave, by Marc Sorkin
- 1940: Paradise Lost, by Abel Gance
- 1941: Vénus aveugle, by Abel Gance
- 1941: The Pavilion Burns, by Jacques de Baroncelli
- 1943: Captain Fracasse, by Abel Gance
- 1944: Sowing the Wind, by Maurice Gleize
- 1949: Mademoiselle de La Ferté, by Roger Dallier
- 1961: The Game of Truth, by Robert Hossein

== Bibliography ==
- Basile Ratiu, L'Œuvre dramatique de Steve Passeur, Paris, Klincksieck, 1964.
