= Marc Pourpe =

French aviation warfare pioneer

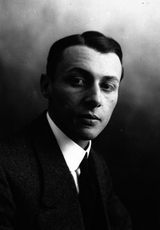
- Born: 17 May 1887; Lorient, French Third Republic
- Died: 2 December 1914 (aged 27); Villers-Bretonneux, Somme, French Third Republic
- Resting place: Lorient Carnel
- Years active: 1911–1914
- Parent(s): Liane de Pougy (mother); Armand Pourpe (father)

Marc Marie Edmond Armand Pourpe (17 May 1887 – 2 December 1914) was a French aviation pioneer and stunt flyer. His mother was Anne-Marie Chassaigne, later known as the famous courtesan Liane de Pougy, and his father a young naval officer, Armand Pourpe. He made the first airmail flight in Egypt flying from Cairo to Khartoum. Pourpe died in World War I on a reconnaissance mission over the Somme in December 1914.

== Life ==
Marc Pourpe was born on 17 May 1887 in Lorient, France to the famous courtesan, Liane de Pougy, who was of Spanish and French descent. His father was Armand Pourpe, a young naval officer who later became a senior officer in the Suez Canal Company. His parents' marriage was not a happy one. His mother, then known as Anne-Marie Pourpe, had run off with Pourpe when she was only 16, and they married once she became pregnant. She later claimed in her memoirs that her new husband took her violently on their wedding night, an event which left her emotionally scarred.

When Armand Pourpe's naval career led him to a billet in Marseille, Anne-Marie took a lover, Charles the 5th Marquis de MacMahon. Her husband found them in bed together and shot her. They divorced shortly thereafter. Anne-Marie went to Paris, leaving her infant son with his father. Armand sent his son to live with the boy's paternal grandparents, in Suez.

Young Marc Pourpe studied at Harrow in anticipation of attending Cambridge or Oxford.

In 1912, while barnstorming in Calcutta in a Blériot, Pourpe met Raoul Lufbery, whom he later hired as his mechanic. The two then began traveling together, continuing Pourpe's tour of Asia, Europe, and Africa.

Pourpe took part in an early "Aviation Week" held at in Heliopolis, near Cairo from 2 January through 12 January 1914. While there he made the first airmail flight in Egypt, flying the 1250 miles from Cairo to Khartoum from 4 January to 12 January, with stops in Luxor, Wadi Halfa, and Abu Hamed. Lufbery was Pourpe's mechanic for the trip. A special stamp was issued to commemorate the event, and air mail delivery was announced.

When World War I broke out, Pourpe joined the French Air Service as a bomber pilot, serving with Escadrille N23. A soldier 2nd class, he had flown nearly eighty hours and thirty missions, when he and the mission observer, Lt. Eugène Vauglin, died on 2 December 1914 on a reconnaissance flight over the Somme.

One account published in 1916 in the 4th edition of the illustrated Air War said his death was caused by an accident at the end of the flight, possibly due to the cold. Numbed by the very low temperature, Pourpe lost control of his aircraft, as he exited a cloud, before "sideslipping" and came crashing to the ground. This accords with both reports of the Escadrille N23 and the testimony of aviation volunteer Jacques Mortane who reported in December 1914 that, accustomed to colonial climates, Pourpe nonetheless took to the air in a cold mist that prevented other flyers from going out. According to Mortane, Pourpe came out of the clouds at 1200 meters completely "unbalanced".

Marc Pourpe is buried in the cemetery of Carnel, Lorient. To mark the centenary of Pourpe's death a street was named in his honor in Carnel.

== See also ==
- Eugene Gilbert

== Sources ==
- Allaz, Camille History of Air Cargo and Airmail from the 18th Century ISBN 978-0-9548896-0-9
- de Pougy, Liane My Blue Notebooks (Mes cahiers bleus, her memoirs), published in English in 1979. ISBN 1-58542-156-1
- Rodriguez, Suzanne Wild Heart: A Life: Natalie Clifford Barney and the Decadence of Literary Paris ISBN 0-06-093780-7
- Taylor, Irene and Taylor, Alan. The Assassin's Cloak: An Anthology of the World's Greatest Diarists, Canongate U.S., 2002, ISBN 1-84195-172-2
