= Panurge (film) =

1932 film

- Directed by: Michel Bernheim
- Written by: Michel Bernheim; Steve Passeur; Gérard Sandoz
- Produced by: Jacques Favre de Thierrens
- Starring: Danielle Darrieux; Jean Marconi; Paul Poiret
- Edited by: Jacques Desagneaux
- Music by: Henri Cliquet-Pleyel
- Release date: 2 December 1932
- Running time: 80 minutes
- Country: France
- Language: French

Panurge is a 1932 French comedy film directed by Michel Bernheim and starring Danielle Darrieux, Jean Marconi and Paul Poiret. At this early stage in her career Darrieux was playing ingenue female leads before her career really took off in 1936.

== Synopsis ==
Régine is a young washerwoman working in a large factory-size laundry, who attracts the admiration of the shoemaker Panurge. The more shy and melancholic Panure has a rival in the flashy Fred who sets out to seduce Régine.

== Cast ==
- Gérard Sandoz as Panurge
- Danielle Darrieux as Régine
- Vincent Hyspa as Le père Varenne
- Jean Marconi as Fred
- Olga Lord as Maud
- Paul Poiret as Le père Ursule
- Georges Benoît
- Pierre Labry
- Anna Lefeuvrier

== Bibliography ==
- Bessy, Maurice & Chirat, Raymond. Histoire du cinéma français: 1929-1934. Pygmalion, 1988.
- Crisp, Colin. Genre, Myth and Convention in the French Cinema, 1929-1939. Indiana University Press, 2002.
- Driskell, Jonathan. The French Screen Goddess: Film Stardom and the Modern Woman in 1930s France. I.B.Tauris, 2015.
- Oscherwitz, Dayna & Higgins, MaryEllen. The A to Z of French Cinema. Scarecrow Press, 2009.
- Rège, Philippe. Encyclopedia of French Film Directors, Volume 1. Scarecrow Press, 2009.
