= Salomon Reinach =

French archaeologist (1858–1932)

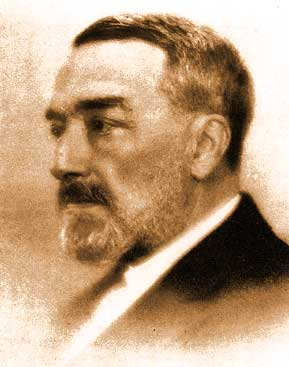
Salomon Reinach

Salomon Reinach (29 August 1858 – 4 November 1932) was a French archaeologist, religious historian and a major figure in the Franco-Jewish establishment in the late nineteenth and early twentieth centuries. He was vice president of the most important contemporary Jewish organization, the Alliance Israelite Universelle, and a founder of the Jewish Colonization Association.

== Biography ==
The brother of Joseph Reinach and Théodore Reinach, he was born at St Germain-en-Laye and educated at the École normale supérieure before joining the French school at Athens in 1879. He made valuable archaeological discoveries at Myrina near Smyrna in 1880–82, at Cyme in 1881, at Thasos, Imbros and Lesbos (1882), at Carthage and Meninx (1883–84), at Odessa (1893) and elsewhere. He received honours from the chief learned societies of Europe.

In 1887 he obtained an appointment at the National Museum of Antiquities at Saint-Germain-en-Laye; in 1893 he became assistant curator, and in 1902 curator of the national museums. In 1903 he became joint editor of the "Revue archéologique", and in the same year officer of the Legion of Honour. The lectures he delivered on art at the École du Louvre in 1902-3 were published by him under the title of "Apollo : histoire générale des arts plastiques professée en 1902-1903 à l'École du Louvre". These were translated into most European languages, and became a standard handbook on the subject.

Liane de Pougy (1869-1950)'s diaries from 1919 to 1941, published as Mes cahiers bleus in French in 1977, and My Blue Notebooks in English in 1979, describe Reinach.

== Publications ==
Reinach's first published work was a translation of Arthur Schopenhauer's "Essay on Free Will" ("Essai sur le libre arbitre", 1877), which passed through many editions. His "Manuel de philologie classique" (1880-1884) was crowned by the French association for the study of Greek; his "Grammaire latine" (1886) received a prize from the Society of Secondary Education; "La Nécropole de Myrina" (1887), written with Edmond Pottier, and "Antiquités nationales" were crowned by the Academy of Inscriptions. He compiled an important "Répertoire de la statuaire grecque et romaine" (3 volumes, 1897–98); also "Répertoire de peintures du Moyen âge et de la Renaissance 1280-1580" (1905, etc.); "Répertoire des vases peints grecs et étrusques" (1900). In 1905 he began his "Cultes, mythes et religions"; and in 1909 he published a general sketch of the history of religions under the title of "Orpheus; histoire générale des religions" (translated into English and published as "Orpheus, a general history of religions").

He also translated from the English H. C. Lea's "History of the Inquisition" as "Histoire de l'Inquisition au Moyen-âge". In 1936 his updated bibliography was published — "Bibliographie de Salomon Reinach". It has been said his bibliography runs to 262 pages and includes more than 90 lengthy works and at least 7,000 articles. (Curtis, 2003)

== Mythicist theories ==
Reinach has been cited as a proponent of the Christ myth theory. However, he did not deny the possibility of an historical Jesus. Reinach is quoted as saying "It is impossible to establish the historical Jesus, which is not to say that he did not exist, but only that we cannot positively affirm anything about him."

Reinach was critical of the Passion of Jesus which he considered was a myth based on pre-existing pagan legends. Reinach was supportive of the mythicist research of William Benjamin Smith. In regard to Smith's Ecce Deus, he wrote that "I have read this great book from cover to cover. It is a possession for ever. The author may not live to see it, but it will be read by myriads and shed light on millions."

Rationalist writer Joseph McCabe wrote that Reinach was "one of the leading French authorities on the science of religion, from which he removes all supernatural elements."

== Death ==
Salomon Reinach died in 1932 and was buried in the Cimetière de Montmartre in the Montmartre Quarter of Paris.

== Published works ==
- Manuel de philologie classique (1880-1884).
- Chronique d'Orient Fouilles et Découvertes a Chypre Depuis l'Occupation Anglaise. Revue Archéologique. 6, 340–364 (1885).
- Grammaire latine (1886).
- La Nécropole de Myrina (1887).
- L'Arc de Titus et les Dépouilles du Temple de Jérusalem (1890)
- Répertoire de la Statuaire Grecque et Romaine (3 volumes, 1897–98).
- Répertoire des Vases Peints Grecs et Étrusques (1900).
- The Story of Art Throughout the Ages, 1904; English translation of Apollo: histoire générale des arts.
- Répertoire de Peintures du Moyen Âge et de la Renaissance 1280-1580 (1905...).
- Apollo: an Illustrated Manual of the History of Art Throughout the Ages Charles Scribner's and Sons, (1907).
- The so-called Asiatic Terracotta Groups, Charles Scribner's sons, (1907).
- Orpheus: A General History of Religions, W. Heinemann, (1909).
- Cults, Myths and Religions, (1912); English translation of Cultes, mythes et religions (1908).
- "The Growth of Mythological Study". The Quarterly Review. 215: 423–441. October 1911.
- A Short History of Christianity, G.P. Putnam's Sons, (1922).
