= Dallier =

Dallier is a French surname. Notable people with the surname include:

- Henri Dallier (1849–1934), French classical organist
- Philippe Dallier (born 1962), French politician
- Roger Dallier (1919–1993), French film director
