= Walking a Tightrope =

1991 film

- Directed by: Nikos Papatakis
- Cinematography: William Lubtchansky
- Music by: Bruno Coulais; Gabriel Fauré
- Release date: 1991
- Language: French

Walking a Tightrope (French: Les Équilibristes) is a 1991 French drama film written and directed by Nikos Papatakis. It was screened in competition at the 48th Venice International Film Festival.

== Cast ==
- Michel Piccoli as Marcel Spadice
- Lilah Dadi as Franz-Ali Aoussine
- Polly Walker as Hélène Lagache
- Patrick Mille as Fredy Babitchev
- Juliette Degenne as Jacqueline Masset
- Doris Kunstmann as Christa Paeffgen Aoussine
- Bernard Farcy as The Policeman
