= Madame Baptiste =

1974 film

- Written by: Claude Santelli; Guy de Maupassant
- Directed by: Claude Santelli
- Starring: Isabelle Huppert
- Country of origin: France
- Original language: French

Original release
- Release: 29 March 1974

Madame Baptiste is a 1974 French television drama film directed by Claude Santelli.

== Cast ==
- Isabelle Huppert - Blanche
- Francine Bergé - The mother
- Jean-Marc Bory - The father
- Roger Van Hool - Raoul Aubertin
- Christian Bouillette - Baptiste
- Laurence Février - Delphine
- Luce Fabiole - Céleste
- Françoise Thuries - The cousin
- Nadine Delanoë - The cousin
- Andrée Champeaux - The aunt
- Teddy Bilis - The doctor
- Gérard Dournel - The priest
- François Germain - The valet
- Martin Trévières - The fanfare chief

== See also ==
- Isabelle Huppert on screen and stage
