= Jean Marconi =

French actor

- Born: 1 June 1906; Toulouse, France
- Died: 11 November 1971 (aged 65); Paris, France
- Occupation: Actor
- Years active: 1928–1971 (film)

Jean Marconi (1906–1971) was a French film, stage and television actor. He played supporting roles in films during the 1930s and 1940s in films such as Mademoiselle Josette, My Woman (1933).

== Selected filmography ==
- Yvette (1928)
- Panurge (1932)
- Mademoiselle Josette, My Woman (1933)
- School for Coquettes (1935)
- Samson (1936)
- The Volga Boatman (1936)
- Under Western Eyes (1936)
- The Flame (1936)
- Port Arthur (1936)
- Francis the First (1937)
- Chéri-Bibi (1938)
- Durand Jewellers (1938)
- Alexis, Gentleman Chauffeur (1938)
- The Spirit of Sidi-Brahim (1939)
- The Fatted Calf (1939)
- Paradise Lost (1940)
- The Suitors Club (1941)
- Parade en 7 nuits (1941)
- Domino (1943)
- The Captain (1946)
- Le secret de soeur Angèle (1956)
- To Die of Love (1971)

== Bibliography ==
- Goble, Alan. The Complete Index to Literary Sources in Film. Walter de Gruyter, 1999.
