= The Crystal Submarine =

1927 film

- Directed by: Marcel Vandal
- Written by: Georges Fouchard
- Starring: Tramel; Anna Lefeuvrier; André Dubosc
- Cinematography: Michel Bernheim; René Guichard; Armand Thirard
- Release date: 1927
- Country: France
- Languages: Silent; French intertitles

The Crystal Submarine (French: Le sous marin de cristal) is a 1927 French silent drama film directed by Marcel Vandal and starring Tramel, Anna Lefeuvrier and André Dubosc.

== Cast ==
- Tramel as Félicien Cassebois
- Anna Lefeuvrier as Madame Cassebois
- André Dubosc as Monsieur Guichard
- Caprine as Madame Guichard
- Georges Bever as Le fils de la concierge
- Marcel Carpentier as Commissaire
- Charles Chanot as Le directeur du combat
- Léon Courtois
- Blanche Dauray as Mademoiselle Guichard
- Gabrielle Fontan as La concierge
- Jean Godard as Favières
- René Lefèvre as Comte des Hurlettes
- Marcel Maupi as Commissaire
- Alexandre Mihalesco as Gustave Lenvolé

== Bibliography ==
- Jay Robert Nash, Robert Connelly & Stanley Ralph Ross. Motion Picture Guide Silent Film 1910-1936. Cinebooks, 1988.
