= Paul Poiret =

French fashion designer (1879–1944)

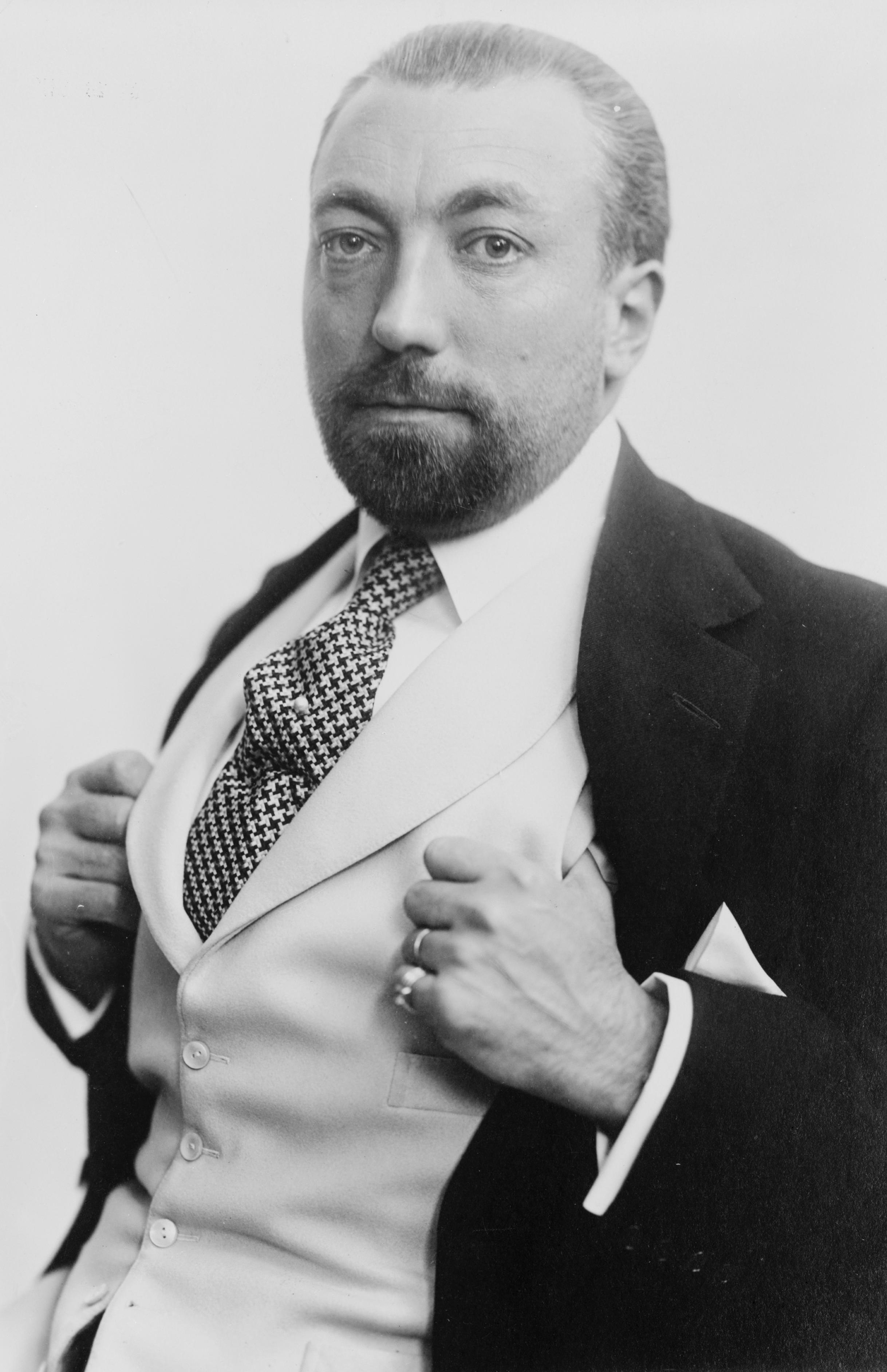
- Poiret c. 1913
- Born: 20 April 1879; Paris, France
- Died: 30 April 1944 (aged 65); Paris, France
- Occupation: Couturier
- Known for: Haute couture and perfumery
- Labels: Maison Paul Poiret; Parfums de Rosine; Les Ateliers de Martine
- Spouse: Denise Poiret (née Boulet)
- Website: poiret.com

Signature
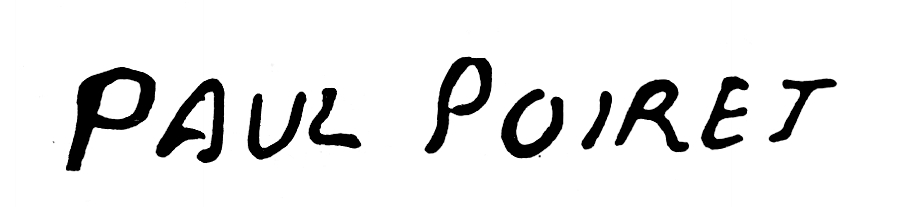

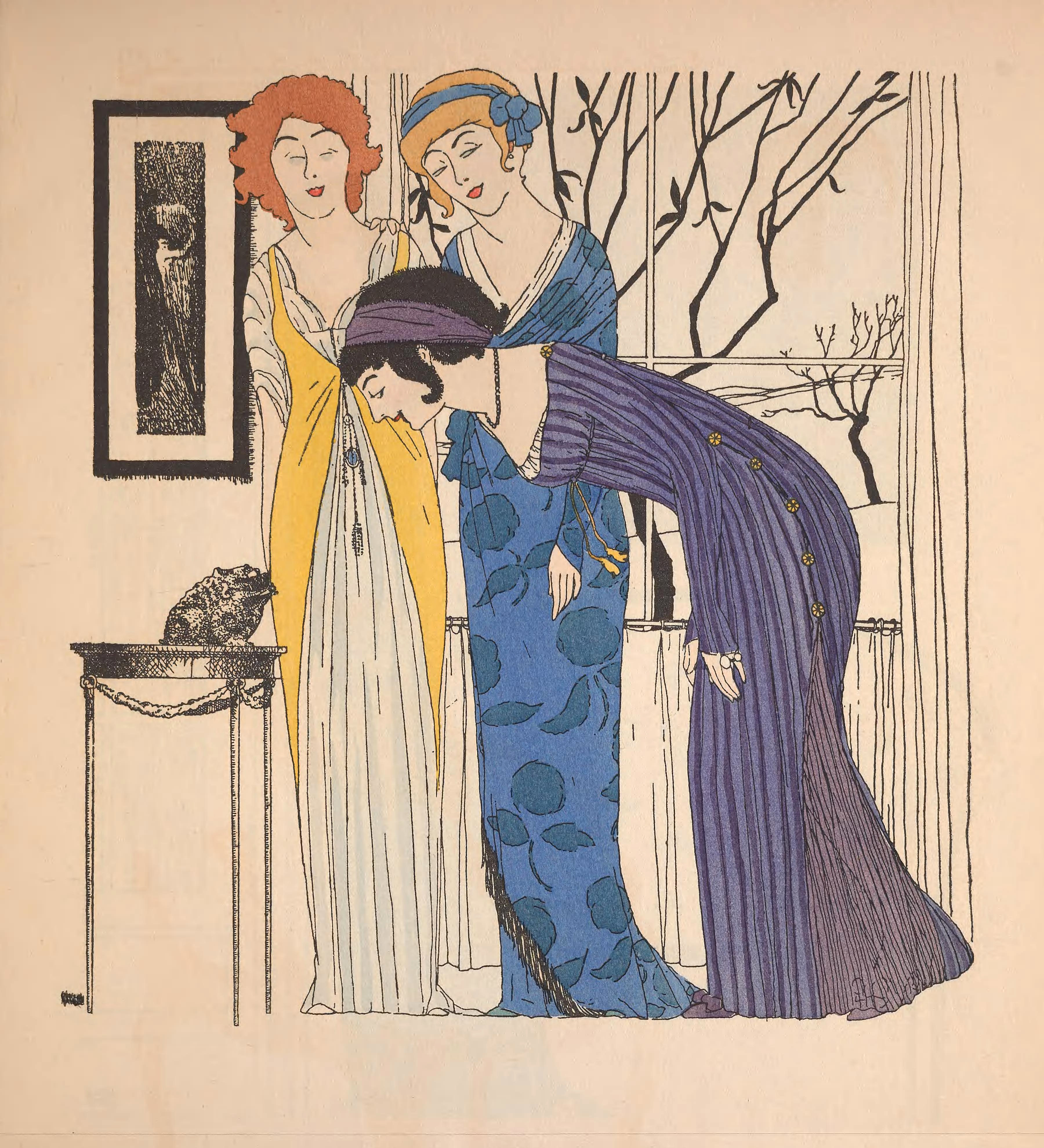
Poiret illustrations by Paul Iribe, 1908

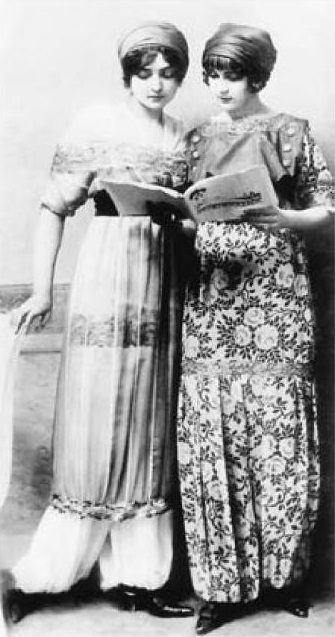
Poiret harem pants and sultana skirts, 1911

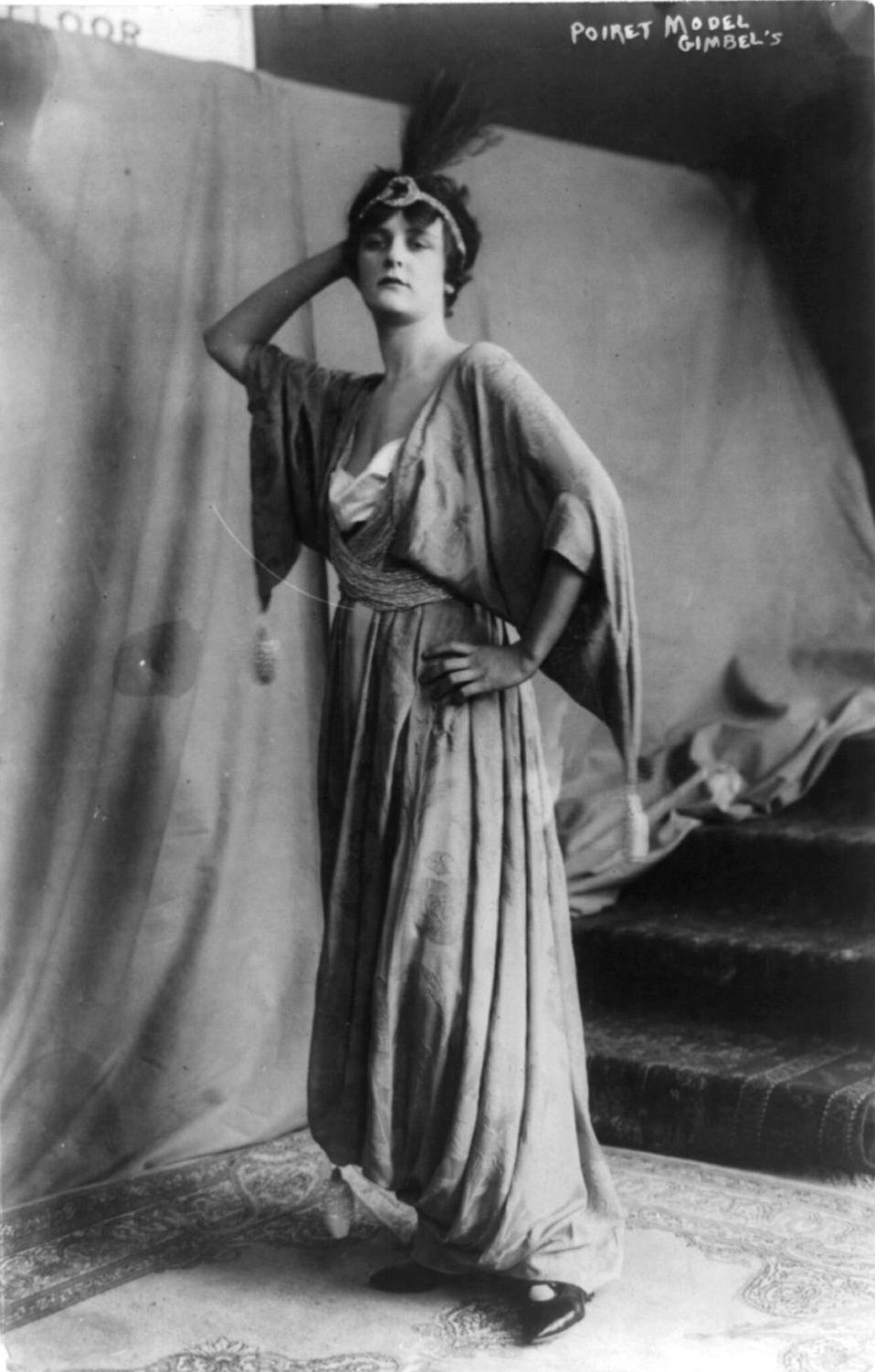
Model in a Poiret dress, 1914

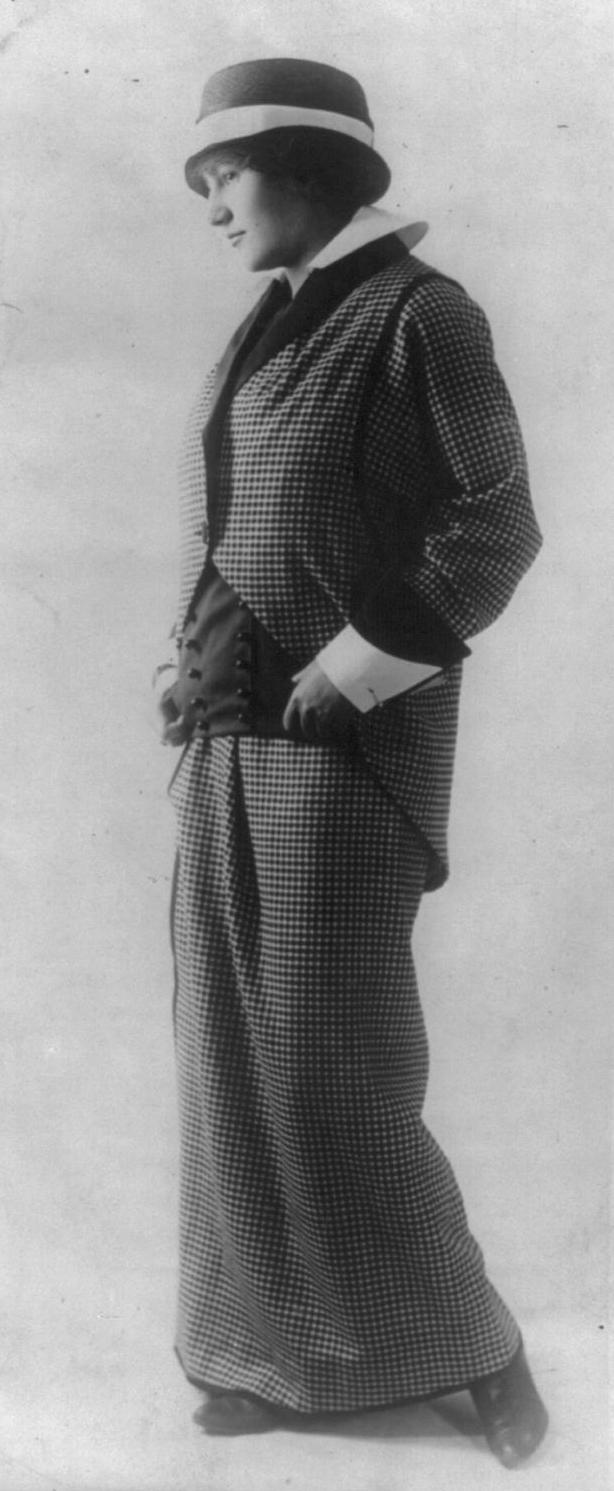
Model in a Poiret suit, 1914

Alexandre Paul Poiret (French pronunciation: [alɛksɑ̃dʁ pɔl pwaʁɛ]; 20 April 1879 – 30 April 1944) was a French fashion designer and master couturier during the first two decades of the 20th century. He was the founder of his namesake haute couture house.

== Early life and career ==
Poiret was born on April 20th 1879 to a cloth merchant in the working class neighbourhood of Les Halles, Paris. His older sister, Jeanne, would later become a jewellery designer. Poiret's parents, in an effort to rid him of his natural pride, apprenticed him to an umbrella maker. There, he collected scraps of silk left over from the cutting umbrella patterns, and fashioned clothes for a miniature mannequin that one of his sisters had given him. While a teenager, Poiret took his sketches to Louise Chéruit, a prominent dressmaker, who purchased a dozen from him. Poiret continued to sell his drawings to major Parisian couture houses as a freelancer, until he was hired by Jacques Doucet in 1898. His first design, a red cloth cape, sold 400 units. He became famous after designing a black tulle mantle over black taffeta, painted by the famous fan painter Billotey. The actress Réjane used it in a play called Zaza, the stage then becoming a typical strategy of Poiret's marketing practices.

In 1901, Poiret moved to the House of Worth, where he was responsible for designing simple, practical dresses, called "fried potatoes" by Gaston Worth because they were considered side dishes to Worth's main course of "truffles". The "brazen modernity of his designs," however, proved too much for Worth's conservative clientele. When Poiret presented the Russian Princess Bariatinsky with a Confucius coat with an innovative kimono-like cut, for instance, she exclaimed, "What a horror! When there are low fellows who run after our sledges and annoy us, we have their heads cut off, and we put them in sacks just like that." This reaction prompted Poiret to fund his own maison.

== Career expansion ==
Poiret established his own house in 1903. In his first years as an independent couturier, he broke with established conventions of dressmaking and subverted other ones. In 1903, he dismissed the petticoat, and later, in 1906, he did the same with the corset. Poiret made his name with his controversial kimono coat and similar, loose-fitting designs created specifically for an uncorseted, slim figure.

Poiret designed flamboyant window displays and threw sensational parties to draw attention to his work. His instinct for marketing and branding was unmatched by any other Parisian designer, although the pioneering fashion shows of the British-based Lucile (Lady Duff Gordon) had already attracted tremendous publicity. In 1909, he was so famous, Margot Asquith, wife of British prime minister H. H. Asquith, invited him to show his designs at 10 Downing Street. The cheapest garment at the exhibition was 30 guineas, double the annual salary of a scullery maid.

Jeanne Margaine-Lacroix presented wide-legged trousers for women in 1910, some months before Poiret, who took credit for being the first to introduce the style.

Poiret's house expanded to encompass interior decoration and fragrance. In 1911, he introduced "Parfums de Rosine," named after his daughter, becoming the first French couturier to launch a signature fragrance, although again the London designer Lucile had preceded him with a range of in-house perfumes as early as 1907. In 1911 Poiret unveiled "Parfums de Rosine" with a flamboyant soiree held at his palatial home, attended by the cream of Parisian society and the artistic world. Poiret fancifully christened the event "la mille et deuxième nuit" (The Thousand and Second Night), inspired by the fantasy of a sultan's harem. His gardens were illuminated by lanterns, set with tents, and live, tropical birds. Madame Poiret herself luxuriated in a golden cage. Poiret was the reigning sultan, gifting each guest with a bottle of his new fragrance creation, appropriately named to befit the occasion, "Nuit Persane." His marketing strategy, played out as entertainment, became the talk of Paris. A second scent debuted in 1912 – "Le Minaret," again emphasizing the harem theme.

In 1911, publisher Lucien Vogel dared photographer Edward Steichen to promote fashion as a fine art in his work. Steichen responded by snapping photos of gowns designed by Poiret, hauntingly backlit and shot at inventive angles. These were published in the April 1911 issue of the magazine Art et Décoration. According to historian Jesse Alexander, the occasion is "now considered to be the first ever modern fashion photography shoot," in which garments were imaged as much for their artistic quality as their formal appearance. A year later, Vogel began his renowned fashion journal La Gazette du Bon Ton, which showcased Poiret's designs, drawn by top illustrators, along with six other leading Paris designers – Louise Chéruit, Georges Doeuillet, Jacques Doucet, Jeanne Paquin, Redfern, and the House of Worth. However, notable couture names were missing from this brilliant assemblage, including such major tastemakers as Lucile, Jeanne Lanvin and the Callot Soeurs.

In 1911, Poiret launched the Les Parfums de Rosine, a home perfume division, named for his first daughter. Henri Alméras was employed as a perfumer by Paul Poiret as of 1923, though certain sources suggest he had worked there since 1914.

Also in 1911, Poiret launched the Les École Martine, a home decor division of his design house, named for his second daughter. The establishment provided artistically inclined, working-class girls with trade skills and income.

In 1911 Poiret leased part of the property at 109 Rue du Faubourg Saint Honoré to his friend Henri Barbazanges, who opened the Galerie Barbazanges to exhibit contemporary art. The building was beside Poiret's 18th century mansion at 26 Avenue d'Antin. Poiret reserved the right to hold two exhibitions each year. One of these was L'Art Moderne en France from 16 to 31 July 1916, organized by André Salmon. Salmon called the exhibition the "Salon d'Antin". Artists included Pablo Picasso, who showed Les Demoiselles d'Avignon for the first time, Amedeo Modigliani, Moïse Kisling, Manuel Ortíz de Zárate and Marie Vassilieff. Poiret also arranged concerts of new music at the gallery, often in combination with exhibitions of new art. The 1916 Salon d'Antin included readings of poetry by Max Jacob and Guillaume Apollinaire, and performances of work by Erik Satie, Darius Milhaud, Igor Stravinsky and Georges Auric.

== Collapse of the Poiret fashion house ==
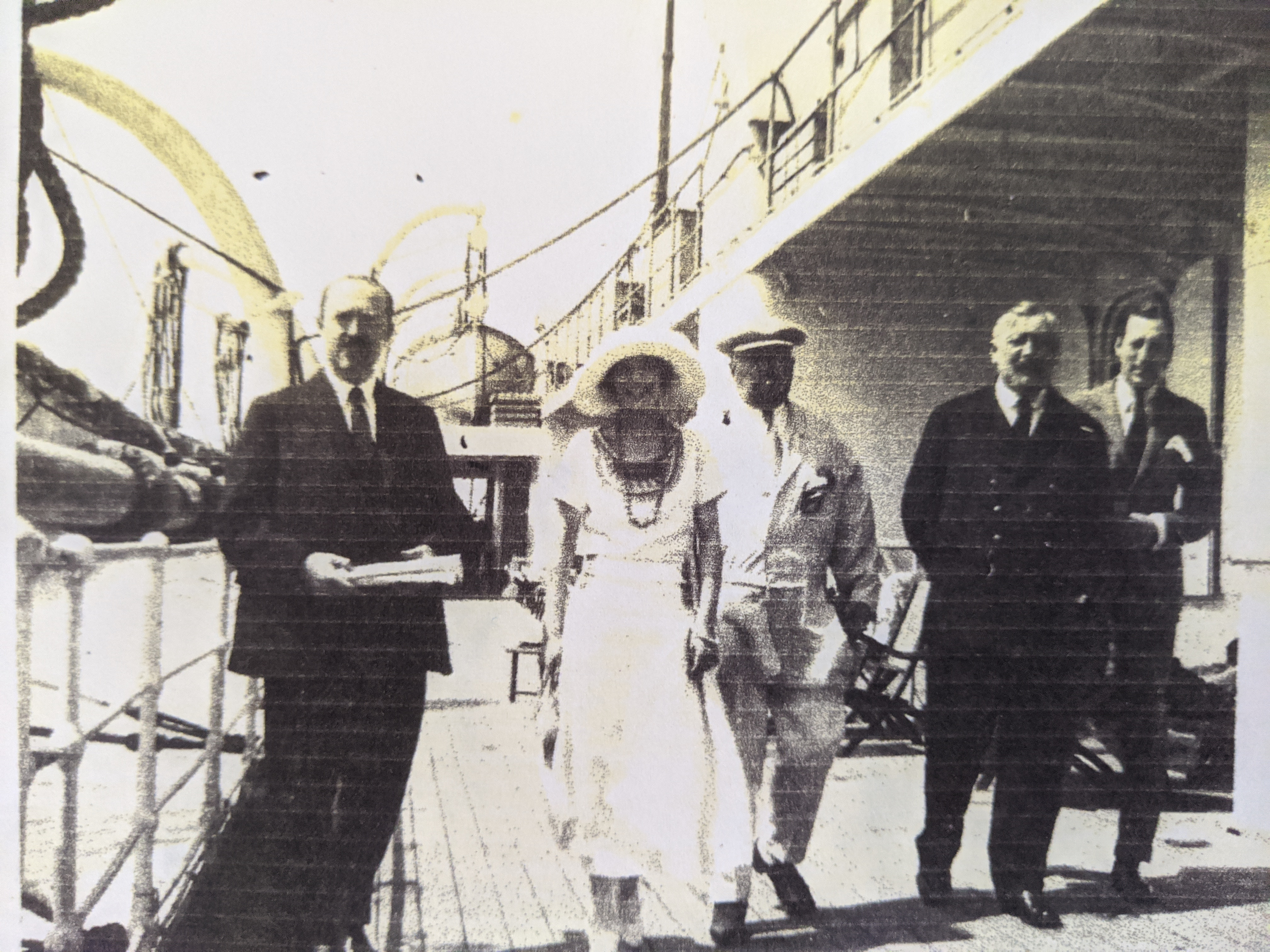
Paul Poiret in 1918, sailing to New York with France Martano (his top designer), ship captain and others.

Early in World War I, Poiret left his fashion house to serve the military. When he returned in 1919, the business was on the brink of bankruptcy. New designers like Chanel were producing simple, sleek clothes that relied on excellent workmanship. In comparison, Poiret's elaborate designs seemed dowdy and poorly manufactured. (Though Poiret's designs were groundbreaking, his construction was not – he aimed only for his dresses to "read beautifully from afar.") In 1922, he was invited to New York to design costumes and dresses for Broadway stars, as he had done for dramatic productions on the French stage. He took his top designer (France Martano) and an entourage with him, enjoying the elegant life at sea (see photos). New York City, however, was not home and he soon returned to Paris leaving his top designer there in his stead. Back in Paris, Poiret was increasingly unpopular, in debt, and lacking support from his business partners. He soon left the fashion empire he had established. While he had designed costumes for several plays produced by Sarah Bernhardt, he also appeared in her last film, The Clairvoyant in 1924, during the making of which Sarah Bernhardt died. In 1929, the house of Poiret was closed, with its leftover stock sold by the kilogram as rags. When Poiret died in 1944, his genius had been forgotten. His road to poverty led him to odd jobs, including work as a street painter, selling drawings to customers of Paris cafes. At one time, the Chambre syndicale de la Haute Couture discussed providing a monthly allowance to aid Poiret, an idea rejected by Worth, at that time president of the group. Only his friend and one of his right-hand designers from his pre-WWI era, France Martano (married name: Benureau), helped him in his era of poverty, when most of Parisian society had forgotten him. At the end of his life, he dined regularly in her family's Paris apartment and she ensured he was not wanting for food. (He'd previously erased her from his memoirs as, after designating her as his long-term replacement to design for Broadway in 1922, he was infuriated that she became an independent couturier upon her return to Paris.) His friend Elsa Schiaparelli prevented his name from encountering complete oblivion, and it was Schiaparelli who paid for his burial.

== Perfumery ==
Poiret was the first fashion designer to establish a perfume line as part of his brand. He founded Parfums de Rosine (named after his eldest daughter, Rosine) in 1911. Original packaging and advertising were created by prominent artists of the era, including Erté and Raoul Duffy.

The Les Parfums de Rosine brand was brought back in 1991 by perfume connoisseur Marie-Hélène Rogeon, whose grandfather had worked for Poiret, with new fragrances created by François Robert.

== Aesthetic and legacy ==
Poiret's major contribution to fashion was his technique of draping fabric, an alternative to the more popular tailoring and use of patterns. Poiret was influenced by both antique and regional dress, and favoured clothing cut along straight lines and decorated with rectangular motifs. The structural simplicity of his clothing represented a "pivotal moment in the emergence of modernism" generally, and "effectively established the paradigm of modern fashion, irrevocably changing the direction of costume history."

Poiret is associated with the decline of corsetry in women's fashion and the invention of the hobble skirt, and once boasted "yes, I freed the bust, but I shackled the legs." Poiret was not the only one responsible for the change in women's supportive garments, however, and the diminished role of corsetry was a result of various factors. Poiret is often described as an Orientalist, and his creations often drew inspiration from various Eastern styles which were at odds with other fashionable Edwardian modes. In 1911, he held an extravagant fancy-dress ball, The 1002nd Night, inspired by the tales of the One Thousand and One Nights, to which he dressed as a sultan bearing a whip and encouraged guests to dress in Orientalist styles, including harem pants and "lampshade" tunics similar to the one worn by his wife.

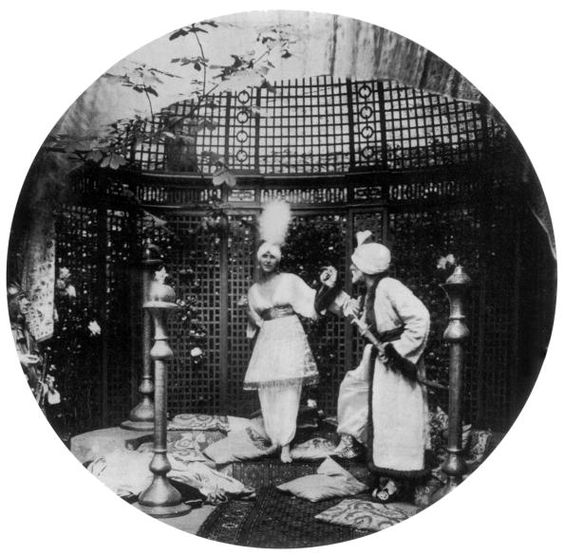
Paul Poiret and his wife at 'The 1002nd Night' fancy-dress ball, in which guests were expected to dress in Orientalist fashion

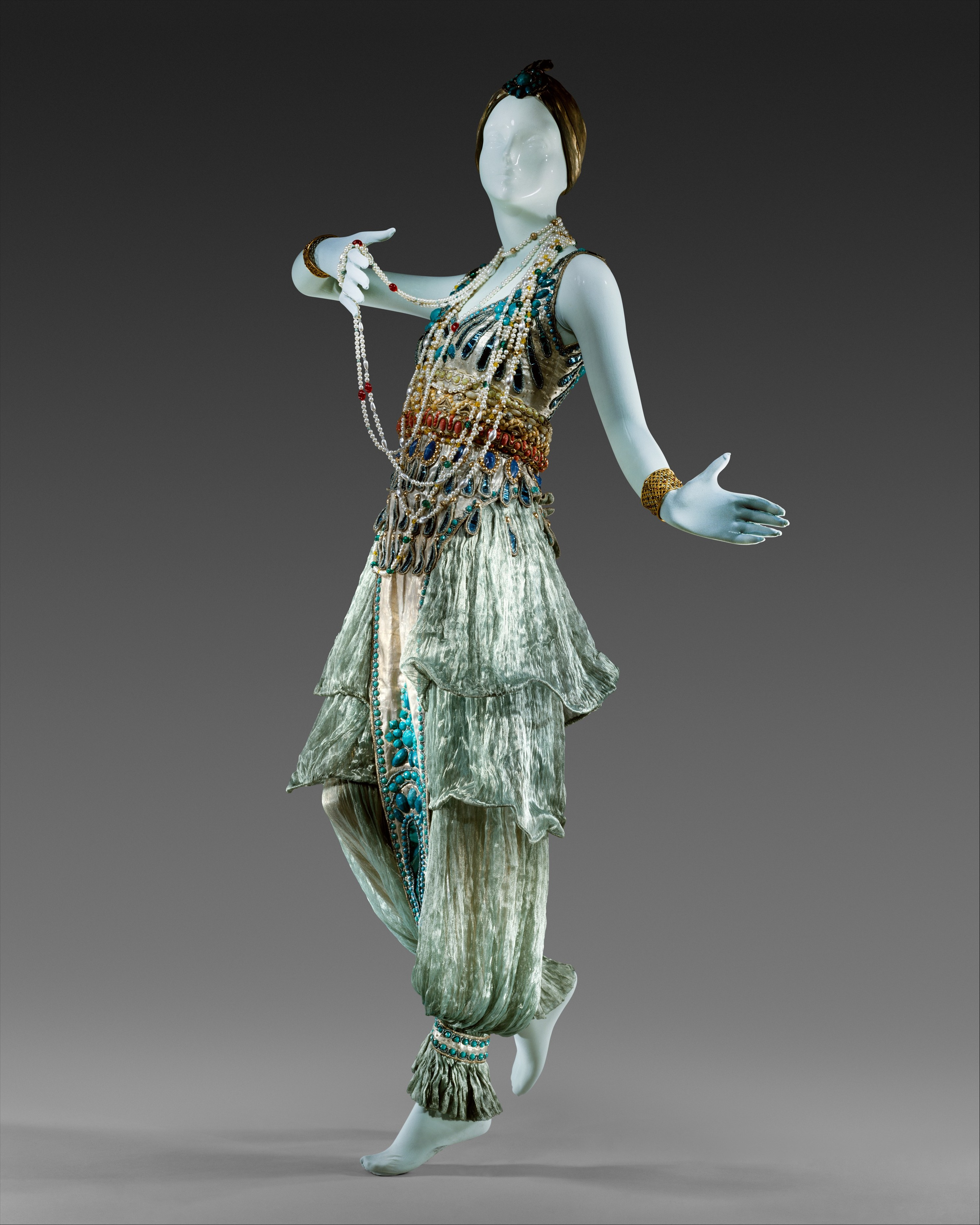
Eastern style fancy-dress costume with harem pants (1911)

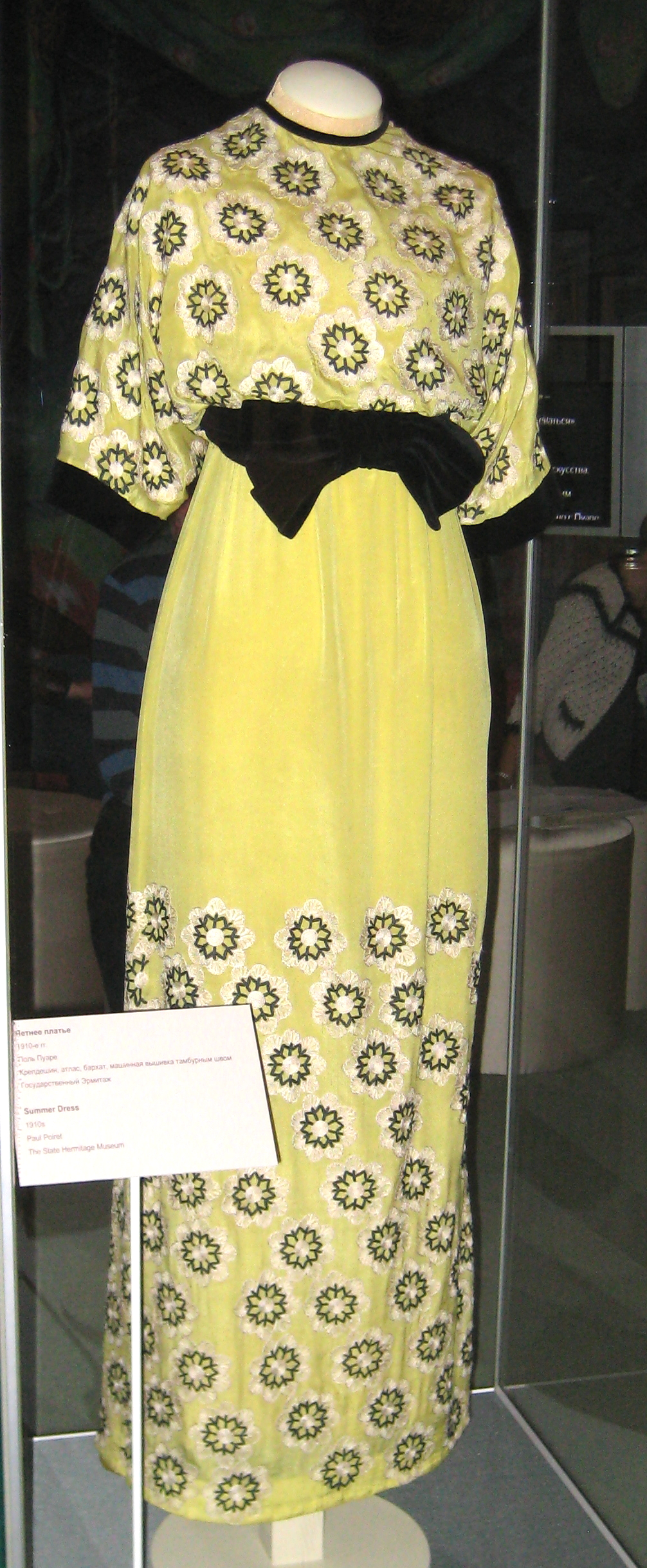
Summer dress (early 1910s).

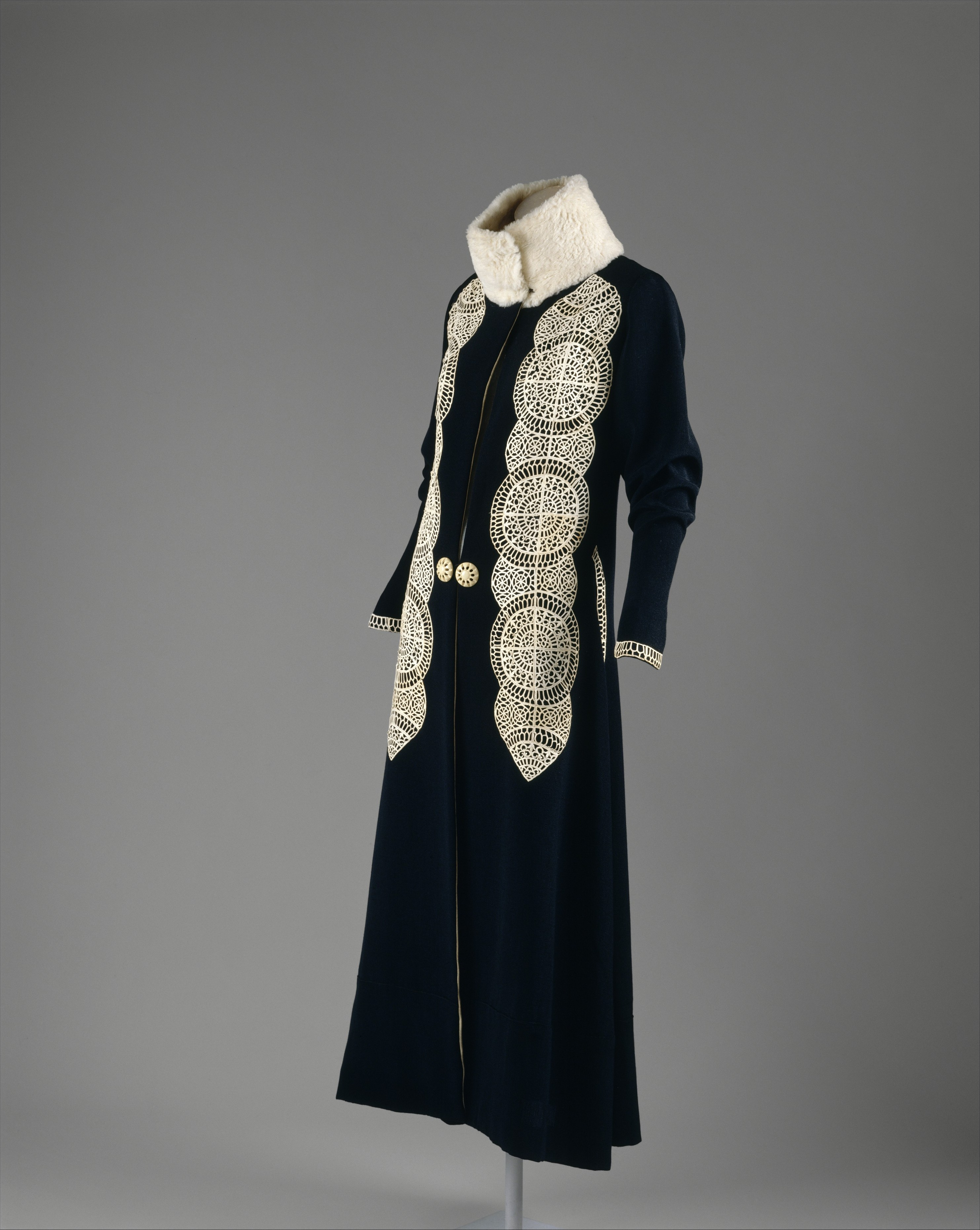
Coat in black wool with fur and leather applique (1919)

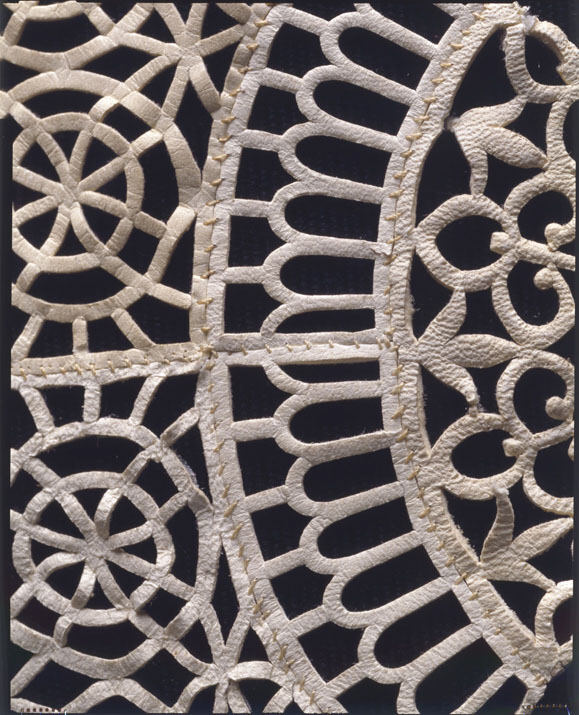
Detail of the leather appliqué on the coat (1919)

Poiret's fashion designs feature prominently in the collections of fashion museums worldwide, and have been displayed in many exhibitions over the years. One such exhibition was "Paul Poiret and Nicole Groult, The Masters of Art Deco Fashion" (Paul Poiret et Nicole Groult, Maîtres de mode Art Déco) at Palais Galliera in Paris in 1986.

In May 2005, the fashion designer Azzedine Alaïa exhibited Denise Poiret's wardrobe in a show called "Free Creativity" (La Création en Liberté) in his showroom before it was auctioned. Denise Poiret's personal sartorial collection broke sales records: in particular, an auto coat that Paul Poiret had designed for her in 1914 went under the hammer for 110,000 Euros.

The Metropolitan Museum of Art in New York purchased many pieces at this auction sale, which was the core of the first American retrospective on the dressmaker from May to August 2007, entitled Paul Poiret: King of Fashion.

In 2011, this show traveled to the Kremlin in Russia to celebrate the hundredth anniversary of Paul Poiret's visit to Moscow and Saint Petersburg.

Additionally, Poiret's perfumes, the Parfums de Rosine, are preserved in several cultural institutions, including the Osmothèque in Versailles.

In 2013, the Musée International de la Parfumerie in Grasse showcased the pioneering perfume branch of Poiret in an exhibition entitled Paul Poiret: Couturier Perfumer.

== Personal life ==
In 1905, Poiret married Denise Boulet, a provincial girl; they would later have five children together. Denise, a slender and youthful woman, was Poiret's muse and the prototype of la garçonne. In 1913, Poiret told Vogue, "My wife is the inspiration for all my creations; she is the expression of all my ideals." The two later were divorced, in 1928 after twenty-three years of marriage, in a proceeding that was far from amicable due to Poiret's many affairs.

Liane de Pougy (1869-1950)'s diaries from 1919 to 1941, published as Mes cahiers bleus in French in 1977, and My Blue Notebooks in English in 1979, describe Poiret.

== Brand revival ==
Commercially inactive since 1933, the Poiret global trademark rights were acquired by the Luxembourg-based company Luvanis in the early 2010s. The right to use the brand name was then sold to the South-Korean fashion and luxury conglomerate Shinsegae Internationalin 2015.

In 2018 Shinsegae officially confirmed the relaunch of Poiret from Paris with Belgian businesswoman Anne Chapelle at its helm, and Paris-based Chinese couturiere Yiqing Yin as its artistic director. However after only two seasons Shinsegae announced the departure of Yiqing Yin and pivoted the brand into primarily cosmetics and skincare.

== See also ==
- 1900s in fashion
- 1910s in fashion
- History of fashion design
- List of Orientalist artists
- Orientalism
