= Histoire vraie =

- Directed by: Claude Santelli
- Starring: Pierre Mondy
- Country of origin: France
- Original language: French

Production
- Running time: 65 minutes

Original release
- Release: 5 May 1973

Histoire vraie is a 1973 French film directed by Claude Santelli.

== Cast ==
- Pierre Mondy as Varnetot
- Marie-Christine Barrault as Rose
- Denise Gence as Mère Paumelle
- Claude Brosset as Le fils Paumelle
- Isabelle Huppert as Adelaïde
- Danielle Chinsky as Félicité (as Danièle Chinsky)
- Lucien Hubert as Déboultot
- Henri de Livry as L'oncle
- Sylvie Herbert as La servante de l'oncle
- Fred Personne as Un convive
- Jean Puyberneau as Un convive
- Marcel Rouzé as Un convive

== See also ==
- Isabelle Huppert on screen and stage
