= My Blue Notebooks =

Excerpts from Liane de Pougy's diaries

My Blue Notebooks (Mes cahiers bleus) is a collection of passages from Liane de Pougy's diaries from 1919 to 1941. Pougy was famous in France and internationally for her beauty, her work as a courtesan, stage performer, socialite, and later member of a community of Catholic nuns. The diaries include an unusual array of socialite reporting, descriptions of debauchery, and in the end a desire for sanctity according to Roman Catholic ideals.

== Major themes in the diaries ==
=== Biographical developments ===
Liane de Pougy was popular primarily for her appearance and her set of friends. Her looks exuded cool composure, classic facial features, and faultless skin. The French press often wrote about Pougy and published pictures of her. Unexpectedly, the life she led as "the most beautiful courtesan of the century” changed radically when she met Prince George Ghika of Moldavia, a nephew of the queen of Greece. They were wed in 1910, making Liane a bona fide princess. From there on, she lived with him for twenty-seven years. The diaries describe their marital ups and downs, with infidelities on each side, although Pougy remained faithful to her husband "from the waist down." He died in 1937, and she became a tertiary sister at a Dominican monastery. It was the fulfillment of a desire she had carried with her for years. Her name as a nun was Sister Mary Magdalene of the Penitence.

=== Religious accents ===
Pougy's attitude toward Christianity is generally positive, but the diaries vary in their religious fervor. She often mentions regularly reading and meditating upon the famous book, The Imitation of Christ, but at the same time she is involved in sexual experiments off-limits for Catholics, like lesbian relations outside of her marriage to Ghika. After a crisis in 1926, the diaries describe how Pougy becomes more and more devoted to Christian prayer and asceticism. Having discovered a home for handicapped children in Lausanne run by Dominican Sisters, Pougy resolves to serve there as a sister and receives permission to do so in 1940.

She ends the diaries by giving permission for them to be published, but only if readers are informed that she has rejected her earlier "sad existence" and considered it debauched: "I repent of that existence, [...] I am ashamed of it, [...] it is ONLY in the spirit of humiliation that I offer them [the diaries]" to the general public.

=== Political accents ===
Pougy makes numerous admiring references to Benito Mussolini.

== Personalities mentioned (selection) ==
- Jean Cocteau
- Cécile Sorel
- Salamon Reinach
- Max Jacob
- Paul Poiret
- Colette
- Gaby Deslys

== Editions ==
In 1977, the first French edition, titled Mes cahiers bleus, with a preface by Dominican priest Alex-Ceslas Rzewuski, was published by Plon.

In 1979, the first English edition, titled My Blue Notebooks, was translated by Diana Athill and published by Harper & Row and Andre Deutsch.; a second edition followed in 2002 by J.P. Tarcher/Putnam. Quality Paperback Book Club bought the rights and the book sold very well.

In 1998, an excerpt from the diares covering the year 1920 was published in the 1998 anthology, The Virago Book of Wanderlust & Dreams, edited by Lisa St. Aubin de Terán.

In 2021, Virginie Girod wrote the preface to the 2021 edition published in Paris by Nouveau monde.

== Reception ==
Mary-Kay Wilmers reviewed it favorably in a review together with other "narcissistic" publications by or about Jean Rhys, Maimie Pinzer, and Gladys, the Duchess of Marlborough.
