= Paradise Lost (1940 film) =

1940 film

- Directed by: Abel Gance
- Written by: Abel Gance; Steve Passeur; Herman G. Weinberg; Joseph Than
- Produced by: Frederic Brunn; Jean Séfert; Joseph Than
- Starring: Fernand Gravey; Elvire Popesco; Micheline Presle
- Cinematography: Christian Matras
- Edited by: Léonide Azar
- Music by: Hans May
- Production company: Tarice Film
- Distributed by: Consortium du Film
- Release date: 26 February 1940
- Running time: 103 minutes
- Country: France
- Language: French

Paradise Lost (French: Paradis perdu) is a 1940 French war drama film directed by Abel Gance and starring Fernand Gravey, Elvire Popesco and Micheline Presle. In pre-First World War Paris, an aspiring artist falls in love with a dressmaker. After she dies in childbirth he volunteers to take part in a dangerous mission during the war. Badly wounded, he nonetheless recovers, and returns home to bring up his only daughter.

== Cast ==
- Fernand Gravey as Le peintre Pierre Leblanc
- Elvire Popesco as Sonia Vorochine
- Micheline Presle as Janine Mercier / Jeannette Leblanc
- André Alerme as le couturier Raoul Calou
- Monique Rolland as Laurence Aubujan
- Robert Le Vigan as Édouard Bordenave
- Robert Pizani as Le couturier Bernard Lesage
- Jane Marken as Madame Bonneron – la concierge
- Marcel Delaître as Le capitaine
- Les Bluebell Girls as Les girls à l'inauguration de la Marie-Galante
- Gérard Landry as Gérard Aubujan
- Jean Marconi as Monsieur Daniel
- Gaby André as Irène

== Bibliography ==
- Dayna Oscherwitz & MaryEllen Higgins. (2009) The A to Z of French Cinema. Scarecrow Press.
