= Herbert Charles Pollitt =

British stage performer (1871– 1942)

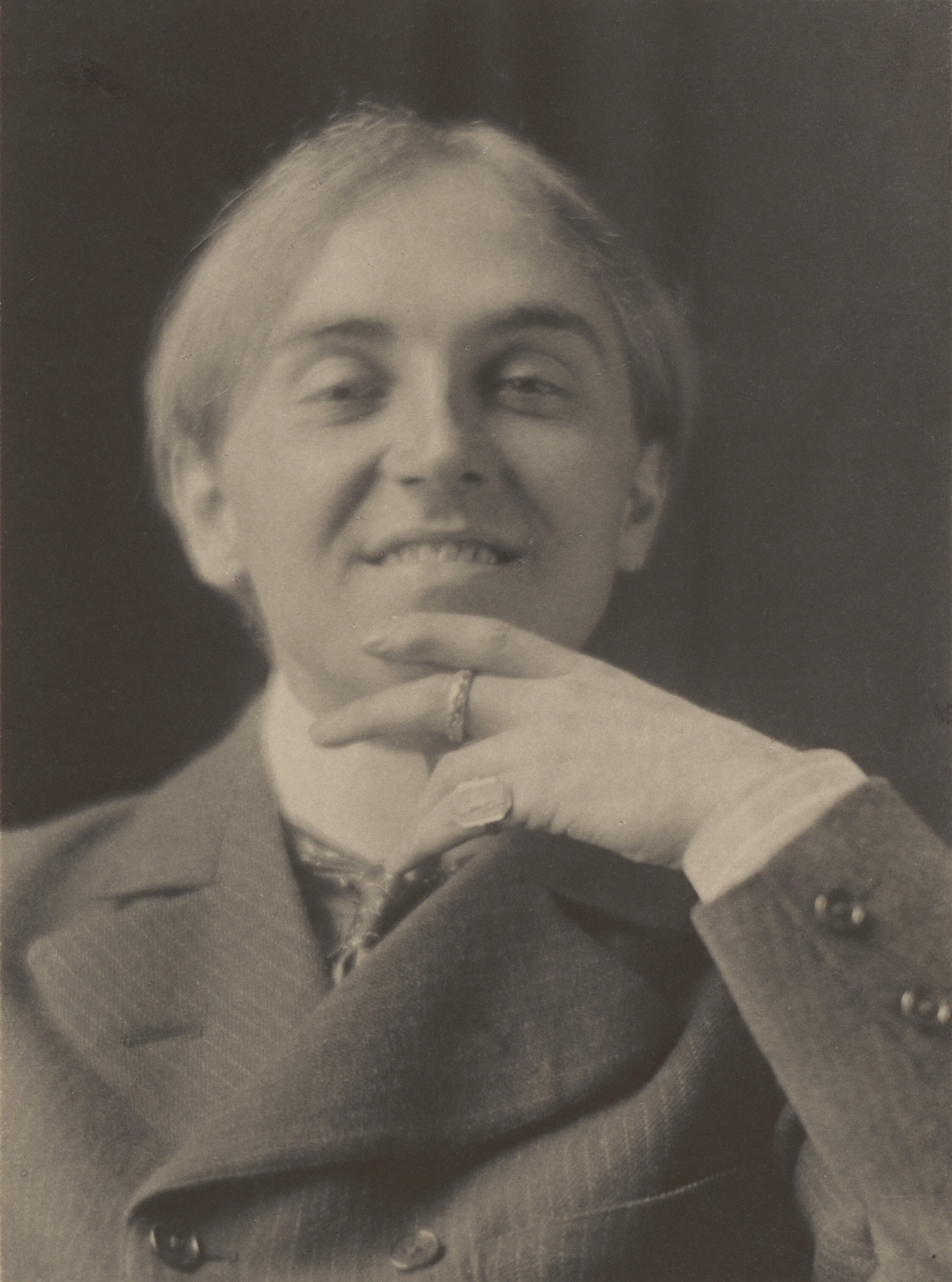
- Portrait by Frederick H. Evans, c. 1894
- Born: July 20, 1871; Kendal, Westmorland
- Died: August 10, 1942 (aged 71)
- Education: Trinity College, Cambridge
- Military career
- Allegiance: United Kingdom
- Branch: British Army
- Service years: 1914–1919
- Rank: Lance corporal
- Unit: Royal Army Medical Corps
- Conflicts: World War I

Herbert Charles Pollitt (July 20, 1871 – 1942), also known as Jerome Pollitt, was a female impersonator who performed as Diane de Rougy (an homage to Liane de Pougy). He became notorious as a Cambridge undergraduate due to his taste for Decadent art and literature, and was immortalised as the eponymous hero of an E. F. Benson novel (The Babe B.A.) in 1896. He became a very close friend of the artist Aubrey Beardsley, and had a brief but significant relationship with the occultist Aleister Crowley. Following his time at Cambridge, Pollitt moved to London and saw service in the First World War as a lance-corporal. He died in 1942.

== Early life and education ==
Pollitt was the son of Charles Pollitt, the proprietor of The Westmorland Gazette and his wife, Jane. He attended Heversham school, then went on to Trinity College, Cambridge in 1889. He gained his BA in 1892 and his MA in 1896.

At Cambridge, he became president of Footlights, the Cambridge University Dramatic Club. He was described as one of the most notorious and talked-about undergraduates of his tenure, his rooms furnished with pictures by Beardsley, James Abbott McNeill Whistler, and Félicien Rops, and his bookshelves stocked with Decadent works. Ultimately, he failed to qualify as a doctor. In late 1897, he decided to be known as Jerome Pollitt.

== Diane de Rougy ==
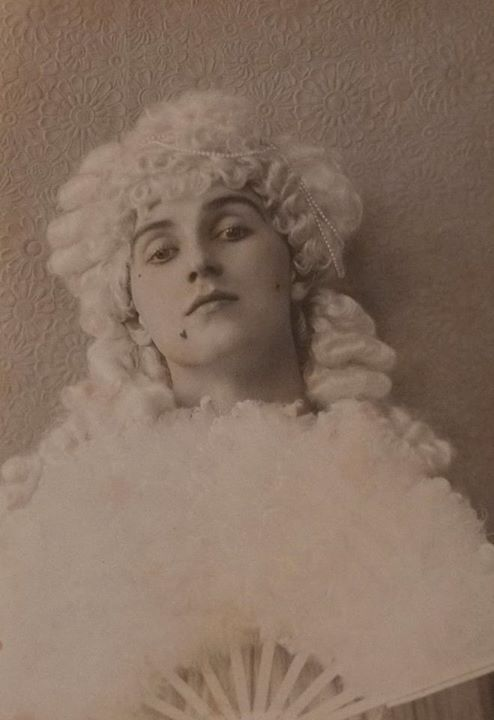
Pollitt as Diane de Rougy, mid 1890s. Photograph by Scott & Wilkinson, Cambridge

The name of Pollitt's female alter-ego, Diane de Rougy, was inspired by Liane de Pougy, a vedette at the Folies Bergère who also had a reputation as one of Paris's most beautiful and notorious courtesans. In performance, however, de Rougy's noted scarf-dancing was more like that of the American dancer Loie Fuller.

As the Footlights were largely a masculine establishment, female impersonation was not uncommon, but de Rougy became particularly renowned for her performances and as much a local Cambridge celebrity as Pollitt himself. She danced in two plays by Arthur Pilkington Shaw for Footlights, and it was claimed that her performances made women jealous. In 1894, Frederick Hollyer exhibited a photographic portrait of de Rougy at the London Photographic Salon.

== As patron ==
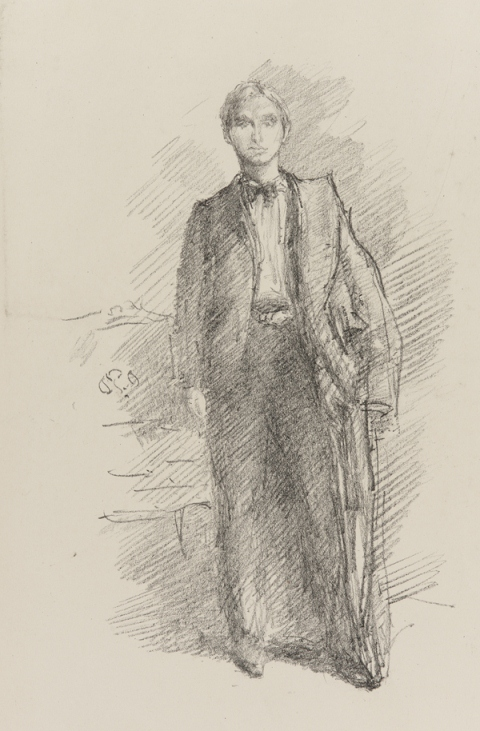
Whistler's lithograph of Pollitt, 1896

Pollitt was a close friend of Aubrey Beardsley and became a collector of his art alongside other examples of erotica. He was also close to Leonard Smithers, Beardsley's publisher, from whom he purchased pornography for his collection. In his last letter, written on his deathbed, Beardsley begged Smithers and Pollitt to destroy all his erotic drawings and work, a request which both men ignored.

Pollitt was also a collector and sometime patron of James Abbott McNeill Whistler, and held an at-home exhibition of the artist's etchings in 1910. While Whistler began painting a portrait of Pollitt in 1896–1897, the painting was unfinished and ultimately destroyed. However, Whistler's lithographic portrait of Pollitt from 1896 and a drawing survive in the collection of the Art Institute of Chicago.

== Personal life ==
In October 1897, following his return to Footlights to perform as Diane de Rougy, Pollitt met Aleister Crowley, and the two swiftly entered into a relationship. Crowley wrote that "I lived with Pollitt as his wife for some six months and he made a poet out of me." The relationship ultimately failed through Pollitt's unwillingness to take part in Crowley's interest in mysticism. This led to a quarrel, in which Crowley informed Pollitt that he did not fit into his plans for his life. Crowley quickly regretted the break-up, but they did not reconcile, and an accidental snub on Bond Street ultimately estranged Pollitt from his former lover. Crowley remained attached to Pollitt, who inspired a number of sonnets and other poems, and immortalized him in his 1910 book on homosexual love, The Scented Garden of Abdullah the Satirist of Shiraz. Finally, in his autobiography The Confessions of Aleister Crowley, he recalled the end of the relationship as a "lifelong regret."

The exact nature of Pollitt's relationship with Beardsley is unclear, although the two men shared a keen interest in erotica and possibly transvestism. Beardsley referred to Pollitt as "My best good friend," and created a bookplate specially for him that seemed to echo Pollitt's vision of his female alter-ego. Pollitt also sent risqué photographs of himself to their mutual friend Oscar Wilde.

== Later life ==
In 1901 Pollitt was living in Marylebone, London. In August 1914 following the outbreak of World War I, he enlisted in the Royal Army Medical Corps and served as a Lance-Corporal of the 9159th regiment.

== In popular culture ==
In E. F. Benson's 1896 novel The Babe B.A., the eponymous Babe is a barely disguised portrait of Pollitt as a student:

The Babe was a cynical old gentleman of twenty years of age, who played the banjo charmingly. In his less genial moments he spoke querulously of the monotony of the services of the Church of England, and of the hope-less respectability of M. Zola. His particular forte was dinner parties for six, skirt dancing and acting, and the performances of the duties of half-back at Rugby football. His dinner parties were selected with the utmost carelessness, his usual plan being to ask the first five people he met, provided he did not know them too intimately. With a wig of fair hair, hardly any rouge, and an ingenue dress, he was the image of Vesta Collins, and that graceful young lady might have practised before him, as before a mirror... The furniture of his rooms was as various and as diverse as his accomplishments. Several of Mr. Aubrey Beardsley's illustrations from the Yellow Book, clustering round a large photograph of Botticelli's Primavera, which the Babe had never seen, hung above one of the broken sofas, and in his bookcase several numbers of The Yellow Book, which the Babe declared bitterly had turned grey in a single night, since the former artist had ceased to draw for it, were ranged side by side with Butler's Analogies, Mr. Sponge's Sporting Tour, and Miss Marie Corelli's Barabbas.
