= Virginie Girod =

French historian

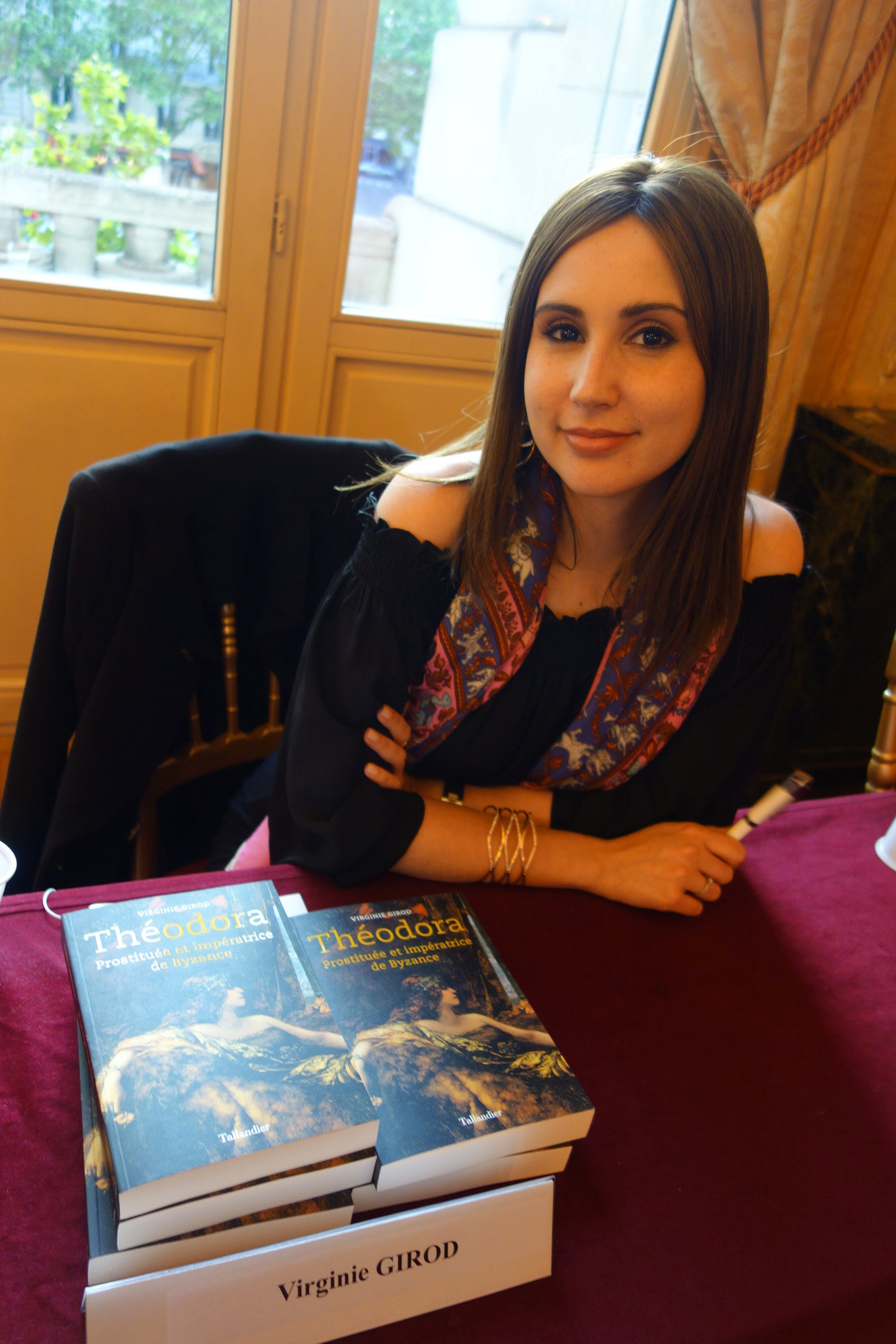
- Born: September 22, 1983 (age 42); Rillieux-la-Pape, France
- Occupations: Professor, Historian

Virginie Girod (born 22 September 1983) is a French historian, and specialist chronicler of the history of women and sexuality.

== Biography ==
Virginie Girod was born in Rillieux-la-Pape, in Lyon, France, on 22 September 1983.

Her university studies included Jean Moulin University Lyon 3 and Paris-Sorbonne University.

She supported a thesis of 3rd cycle in 2011 conducted by called Yann Le Bohec and Giles Sauron « L’érotisme féminin à Rome, dans le Latium et en Campanie, sous les Julio-Claudiens et les Flaviens : recherches d’histoire sociale ».

She teaches Roman history then Université populaire de Caen, founded by Michel Onfray, from 2014 to 2016. Since 2018, she started teaching studies in Ancient Roman History in Paris Diderot University.

She has collaborated in numerous magazines such as Lire, Le Point, Civilisations, and Historia.

== Bibliography ==
- Les femmes et le sexe dans la Rome Antique (in French). Paris: Tallandier. 2013. p. 364. ISBN 979-10-210-0115-2.
- Agrippine, sexe, crimes et pouvoir dans la Rome impériale (in French). Paris: Tallandier. 2015. p. 299. ISBN 979-10-210-0491-7.
- Théodora, prostituée et impératrice de Byzance (in French). Paris: Tallandier. 2018. p. 300. ISBN 979-10-210-1822-8.,.
- Une matrice : la cour romaine du Haut-Empire à l'Antiquité tardive, dans Histoire mondiale des cours de l'Antiquité à nos jours, sous la direction de Victor Battaggion et de Thierry Sarmant, Paris, Perrin, 2019. Prix Michelet 2019
- La véritable histoire des douze Césars (in French). Paris: Perrin. 2019. p. 412. ISBN 978-2-262-07438-8.
- Liane de Pougy, Mémoires d'une grande horizontale. Mes cahiers bleus, Préface de Virginie Girod, Paris, Nouveau monde, 2021 ISBN 9782380940565
