= Roger Dallier =

- Born: Roger Paulin Detienne; 4 November 1919; Bourganeuf
- Died: 29 September 1993 (aged 73); Vigneux-sur-Seine

Roger Dallier (4 November 1919 - 29 September 1993) was a French assistant director and film director.

== Filmography ==
Director

- 1949 : Mademoiselle de La Ferté
- 1973 : Du plomb dans la tête
- 1976 : Larguez les amarres !
- 1979 : Le Crime des innocents
- 1980 : La Petite valise

Assistant director

- 1946 : Le Pays sans étoiles by Georges Lacombe
- 1947 : La Kermesse rouge by Paul Mesnier
- 1948 : Les Condamnés by Georges Lacombe
- 1948 : Le Carrefour des passions by Ettore Giannini
- 1951 : Juliette, or Key of Dreams by Marcel Carné
- 1953 : Leur dernière nuit by Georges Lacombe
- 1956 : L'Homme aux clefs d'or by Léo Joannon
- 1957 : Le Désert de Pigalle by Léo Joannon
- 1958 : Mon coquin de père by Georges Lacombe
- 1961 : Amazons of Rome by Carlo Ludovico Bragaglia and Vittorio Cottafavi
- 1961 : Dynamite Jack by Jean Bastia
- 1962 : L'assassin est dans l'annuaire by Léo Joannon
- 1963 : Les Abysses by Nikos Papatakis
- 1963 : Le bon roi Dagobert by Pierre Chevalier
- 1966 : Trois enfants... dans le désordre by Léo Joannon
- 1967 : Un idiot à Paris by Serge Korber
- 1967 : Les Arnaud by Léo Joannon
- 1970 : L'Ardoise by Claude Bernard-Aubert
