= Anna Lefeuvrier =

French actress (1888–1954)

- Born: Anna-Marie-José Lefeuvrier; 4 November 1888; Paris, France
- Died: 9 July 1954 (aged 65); Clichy-la-Garenne, France
- Occupation: Actress
- Years active: 1924–1940 (film)

Anna Lefeuvrier (1888–1954) was a French film actress.

== Selected filmography ==
- Jean Chouan (1926)
- The Crystal Submarine (1927)
- Two Timid Souls (1928)
- Night Shift (1932)
- Panurge (1932)
- The Wonderful Day (1932)
- The Weaker Sex (1933)
- All for Love (1933)
- The Mondesir Heir (1940)

== Bibliography ==
- Powrie, Phil & Rebillard, Éric. Pierre Batcheff and stardom in 1920s French cinema. Edinburgh University Press, 2009.
