= Port Arthur (film) =

1936 film

- Directed by: Nicolas Farkas
- Written by: Henri Decoin; Nicolas Farkas; Arnold Lippschitz; Steve Passeur; Emeric Pressburger; Hans Klaehr; Kurt Heuser
- Based on: Port Arthur by Pierre Frondaie
- Produced by: Pierre O'Connell
- Starring: Anton Walbrook; Danielle Darrieux; Charles Vanel
- Cinematography: Otto Heller; Georg Krause; Jaroslav Tuzar
- Edited by: Roger Mercanton; Carl Forcht
- Music by: Otakar Jeremiás
- Production companies: Société des Productions Cinématographiques F.C.L. Tobis Film; Slavia
- Distributed by: Films Sonores Tobis
- Release dates: 7 December 1936 (Germany); 11 December 1936 (France)
- Running time: 83 minutes
- Countries: France; Czechoslovakia; Germany
- Languages: French; Germany

Port Arthur (French: Port-Arthur) is a 1936 war drama film directed by Nicolas Farkas and starring Anton Walbrook, Danielle Darrieux and Charles Vanel. It was a co-production between France, Czechoslovakia and Germany. Separate versions were produced in French and German, with Walbrook starring in both versions. The film was based on a novel of the same title by Pierre Frondaie. It was shot at the Barrandov Studios in Prague. The film's sets were designed by the art director Alexandre Lochakoff, Stepán Kopecký and Vladimir Meingard. It premiered at the Ufa-Palast am Zoo in Berlin on 7 December 1936 and had its Paris opening four days later.

== Cast ==
=== French version ===
- Anton Walbrook as Boris Ranewsky
- Danielle Darrieux as Youki, Boris's wife
- Charles Vanel as Commander Vassidloff
- Jean-Max as Ivamoura, Youki's brother
- Jean Worms as Commander Novitzki
- Foun-Sen as La servante
- Jean Appert
- Jean Dax
- Ky Duyen
- René Fleur
- Jean Marconi
- Pierre Nay
- Philippe Richard

=== German version ===
- Anton Walbrook as Boris Ranewsky
- Karin Hardt as Youki - Boris's Wife
- René Deltgen as Ivamoura - Youki's Brother
- Paul Hartmann as Wossidlow
- Werner Pledath as Novitzki
- Ferdinand Classen as Li Hung
- Hugo Werner-Kahle as General Stoessel
- Fritz Klippel as Adjutant
- Foun-Sen as Dienerin Alma
- Wilhelm König
- Karl Meixner
- Karl Morvilius
- Erich Nadler
- Theodore Rocholl

== Release ==
The film was shown in the United States at the Apollo Theater in October 1941.

== Works cited ==
- Waldman, Harry (2008). Nazi Films In America, 1933-1942. McFarland & Company. ISBN 9780786438617.

== Bibliography ==
- Bessy, Maurice & Chirat, Raymond. Histoire du cinéma français: 1935-1939. Pygmalion, 1986.
- Crisp, Colin. Genre, Myth and Convention in the French Cinema, 1929-1939. Indiana University Press, 2002.
- Goble, Alan. The Complete Index to Literary Sources in Film. Walter de Gruyter, 1999.
- Rège, Philippe. Encyclopedia of French Film Directors, Volume 1. Scarecrow Press, 2009.
