= Les Abysses =

1963 film

- Directed by: Nikos Papatakis
- Written by: Jean Vauthier; Louis Jouvet (uncredited)
- Produced by: Nikos Papatakis
- Starring: Francine Bergé; Colette Bergé
- Cinematography: Jean-Michel Boussaguet
- Edited by: Edwige Bernard
- Distributed by: Lenox Films
- Release date: 19 April 1963
- Running time: 90 minutes
- Country: France
- Language: French

Les Abysses is a 1963 French crime film directed by Nikos Papatakis. It was entered into the 1963 Cannes Film Festival. A violent and surrealistic mixture of farce and social commentary, its story was inspired by the real-life case of the Papin sisters.

== Plot ==
Michèle and Marie-Louise (played by sisters Francine and Colette Bergé) are alone in the country house owned by their employers, the Lapeyres. They have not been paid any wages for three years, but the Lapeyres have promised them ownership of the chicken-house attached to their property; now, however, they intend to sell it entirely, leaving the girls with nothing. Michèle and Marie-Louise argue, fight and make up, meanwhile allowing the house to fall into ruin. Suddenly the Lapeyres return, earlier than expected. The girls rebel, disobeying the Lapeyres and tormenting them, especially their adult daughter Elisabeth, who appears to have a lesbian attachment to Marie-Louise, though she is married. Her husband Philippe arrives, bringing with him buyers for the house; Michèle and Marie-Louise are cowed into submission and serve coffee while the deal is signed. Once this is done, however, they break out again, first locking themselves in the kitchen quarters then attacking Elisabeth and Mme Lapeyre and murdering them with a kitchen knife and a flat iron. The film ends with a caption, making explicit reference to the Papin sisters.

== Cast ==
- Francine Bergé as Michèle
- Colette Bergé as Marie-Louise
- Pascale de Boysson as Elisabeth Lapeyre
- Colette Régis as Mme. Lapeyre
- Paul Bonifas as Mons. Lapeyre
- Jean-Louis Le Goff as Philippe
- Lise Daubigny as Buyer
- Robert Benoît as Buyer
- Marcel Roche as Buyer
