= Alexander Rzewuski =

Polish-Russian aristocrat (1893–1983)

Alexander Rzewuski (9 March 1893 – 13 September 1983) (also known as Alex-Ceslas Rzewuski) was a Catholic clergyman of Polish-Russian aristocratic background, with a Russian Orthodox background. He was also a writer and illustrator.

== Biography ==
Alexander descended from a long line of Poles who had played a prominent part in the history of their country. At the last partition of Poland in 1795, they passed over to the service of the Russian Empire. Rzewuski's grandfather was in the personal suite of four Tsars, and his father, General Adam Rzewuski, born in Ukraine, was military Governor of the Caucasus region at the time of Alexander's birth there in 1893.

Alexander's mother Katarzyna Lubarski-Fluki was a Russian from the Saint Petersburg aristocracy. He was baptised into the Russian Orthodox Church and spent his childhood partly in the Caucasus (with forays into Azerbaijan and Chechnya) and partly in Ukraine, where a series of French and English governesses educated him and his sisters at home.

As an adolescent of 14, he was sent north, far from the mountains of the Caucasus, to school in Saint Petersburg at the Imperial Alexander Lycée. Schooling completed, he passed on to the university there. As an undergraduate, he was profoundly, if imperceptibly, affected by the philosophy lectures. A cast of mind which was to stay with him until his student days as a Dominican, was introduced.

Rzewuski served during the war as an officer in command of organising fleets of ambulances for the wounded.

=== October Revolution, artwork and conversion ===
During the October Revolution, at a family council it was decided that Alexander and his relatives all should flee to the Italy, where they had members of their wider family. Three weeks later, after criss-crossing through Poland, Czechoslovakia and Austria, they were all ensconced in the Palazzo Caetani in Rome.

However, Alexander was starting his painting career and for this Paris promised greater opportunity than Rome. He moved there and worked as an artist between 1920 and 1926, winning a reputation as a portrait painter and illustrator; he also designed a film set for a Blaise Cendrars production, as well as some costume design.

This whirl of success came to a sudden halt when he was introduced to the Catholic philosopher Jacques Maritain. One day in conversation with him Maritain said quite simply: "I think that you should see a priest, and I recommend Msgr Vladimir Ghika."

Eventually convinced of the validity of the Catholic position, he was waiting his mother's agreement to his leaving the Church of his birth: an event she dreaded. This time, unlike Trebizond 10 years before, the effect was thorough and definitive.

One night, towards the end of the war, he knocked at the door of Italian Capuchins in Trebizond demanding to be received into the Catholic Church on the spot.

The Italian friar was startled at the demand so peremptorily put by the Russian Imperial Officer. Strictly speaking it was against the law for a Russian Orthodox subject of the Tsar to become a Catholic. To accede to the request could have unhappy repercussions for the small Italian mission. However, Rzewuski must have been persuasive as he left the friary that same night as a member of the Catholic Church.

In 1918, just as the Alexander Kerensky government was about to fall, and be succeeded by Vladimir Lenin's coup d'état, Rzewuski undertook a dangerous journey to Saint Petersburg to recoup some of the family's money from the floundering banks. Successful in this, he threaded his way back south to Kiev, where his family had sought refuge.

=== Priesthood ===
Rzewuski successfully sought membership in religious life as a Dominican, and years later, with the novitiate and course of studies completed, he was ordained in 1932.

His first assignment was to Albertinum at Fribourg in Switzerland as spiritual director to the 200 international seminarians, sent here by their bishops from around the world to study under the Dominicans.

Rzewuski was extremely unimpressed with their lack of intellectual passion and their professional ambition to become important in the clerical field of Church politics. He suffered here for 13 years, but he did make some friends, among them the theologian Charles Journet and Liane de Pougy, and frequently sought some refreshment at the Charterhouse of Valsainte. He always considered solitude to be his true calling, and had friends among the Carthusians.

When World War II ended, he returned to France to become novice-master for six years in Saint Maximin, Toulouse, followed by four years on the Ste Baume, a bare mountain overlooking the Mediterranean, and a place of pilgrimage in honour of Mary Magdalene. At last some measure of solitude was his in this place of retirement. The final decades of his life were passed at the vicariate of Prouilhe as well as caring for the contemplative Dominican nuns at Prouilhe, and in other parts of the world before his death in 1983.

== Publications ==
- L'instant: Testament d'un Dominicain (1980)
- Confessions of a Dominican: From the parties of the roaring twenties to the silence of the cloister (1984)
- La double tragédie de Misia Sert
