= Claude Santelli =

French film director

- Born: 17 June 1923; Metz, France
- Died: 14 December 2001 (aged 78)
- Occupations: Film director Screenwriter
- Years active: 1957-2001

Claude Santelli (17 June 1923 – 14 December 2001) was a French film director and screenwriter. He directed 25 films between 1968 and 1996.

== Selected filmography ==
- Histoire vraie (1973)
- Madame Baptiste (1974)
