= Michel Bernheim =

French cinematographer and film director

- Born: Michel Paul Bernheim; 17 January 1908; Paris
- Died: 20 April 1985 (aged 77); Paris

Michel Paul Bernheim (17 January 1908, in Paris – 20 April 1985 in Paris) was a French cinematographer and film director

== Filmography ==
Cinematographer :

- 1927: The Crystal Submarine by Marcel Vandal
- 1928: Nile Water by Marcel Vandal

Assistant-director :

- 1929: La Vie miraculeuse de Thérèse Martin by Julien Duvivier
- 1929: La Divine Croisière by Julien Duvivier
- 1931: Coquecigrole by André Berthomieu
- 1932: Azaïs by René Hervil

Director :

- 1932: Panurge
- 1935: Marie des angoisses
- 1936: Le roman d'un spahi
- 1937: Police mondaine (codirector : Christian Chamborant)
- 1938: L'Ange que j'ai vendu
- 1953: Le gouffre de la Pierre Saint-Martin (short documentary)
