= Marie Redonnet =

French writer

Marie Redonnet is the nom de plume of Martine L'hospitalier (born 1948, Paris) who is a French writer of poems, novels, essays, short stories, and plays. Her works have been translated into eleven languages.

== Biography ==
Martine L'hospitalier was born in 1948, her mother's birth name was Redonnet. She studied literature, particularly Jean Genet, and she became a teacher and began writing in the late 1970s. Her first published work was Le Mort & Cie (tr. Dead Man & Company), a collection of poems released in 1985. The following year, she published a collection of short stories entitled Doublures. She followed that with a trilogy of novels: Splendid Hôtel (1986), Forever Valley, and Rose Mélie Rose (1987).

Redonnet has taught at the Université de la Sorbonne-Nouvelle. From 1995 to 1997, she was responsible for the research of art and language at the Centre national de la recherche scientifique. From 2000 to 2004, she was an advisor for literature at the French embassy in Morocco.

Her books are written in sparse prose that some have compared to Samuel Beckett.

Redonnet and her son are based in Morocco.

== Selected works ==
=== Novels ===
- Hotel Splendid (1986)
- Rose Mellie Rose (1987)
- Forever Valley (1987)
- Candy Story (1992)
- Nevermore (1994)
- Diego (2005)

=== Short stories ===
- Silsie (1990)

=== Plays ===
- Tir & Lir (1988)
- Mobie-Diq (1989)
- Seaside (1991)
- Le Cirque Pandor and Fort Gambo (1991)
