= Liane de Pougy =

French courtesan, dancer and novelist (1869–1950)

Liane de Pougy TOSD
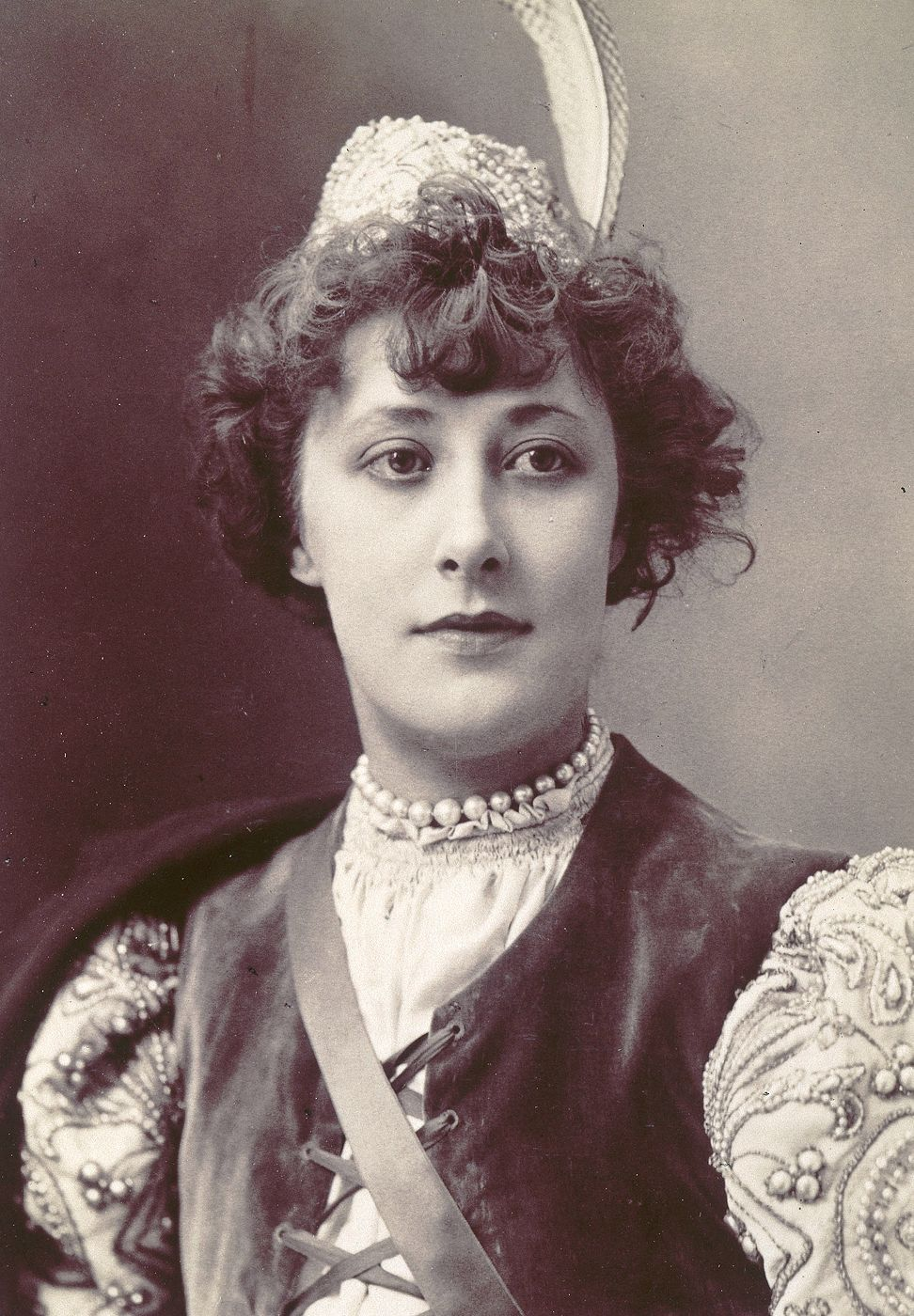
- Liane de Pougy by Nadar
- Born: Anne Marie Chassaigne; 2 July 1869; La Flèche, Sarthe, Second French Empire
- Died: 26 December 1950 (aged 81); Lausanne, Switzerland
- Other names: Anne-Marie-Madeleine de la Pénitence; Marie Anne Pourpe; Princess Ghika; Anne-Marie Ghika; Sister Anne-Mary
- Occupations: Dancer, Courtesan, Novelist
- Spouses: Armand Pourpe (m. 1886; div. 1889) Prince Georges Ghika (m. 1910; died 1945)
- Children: Marc Pourpe

Liane de Pougy (born Anne-Marie Chassaigne, 2 July 1869 – 26 December 1950) was a French dancer, courtesan and novelist. She was a Folies Bergère vedette, and was known as one of the most beautiful and notorious courtesans in Paris. Later in life, she became a Dominican tertiary.

== Early life and marriage ==
Anne-Marie Chassaigne was born on 2 July 1869 in La Flèche, Sarthe, France, the daughter of Pierre Blaise Eugène Chassaigne and his Spanish-French wife Aimée Lopez. She had an older brother, Pierre (1862–1921). She was raised in a nunnery. At the age of 16, she ran off with Joseph Armand Henri Pourpe, a naval officer, whom she married after getting pregnant. The baby was named Marc Pourpe. De Pougy described herself as a terrible mother, saying, "My son was like a living doll given to a little girl." She also admitted she would have preferred the baby to be a girl ‘because of the dresses and the curly hair’. Marc grew up to volunteer as an airman in World War I and was killed on 2 December 1914 near Villers-Brettoneux.

The marriage was not a happy one. Anne-Marie later wrote in her memoirs that her new husband took her violently on their wedding night, an event which left her emotionally scarred. It is said that the groom was a brute and abused her – she wore the scar of his beatings on her breast for the rest of her life. When Armand Pourpe's naval career led him to a billet in Marseille, Anne-Marie took a lover, Charles-Marie de Mac-Mahon, 5th marquis of Éguilly. When her husband found them in bed together he shot her with a revolver, wounding her on the wrist.

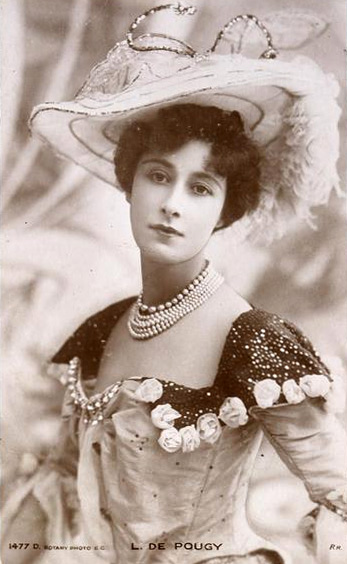
1886

Deciding to leave her husband, Anne-Marie sold her rosewood piano to a young man who paid 400 francs cash for the instrument. Within an hour, she was on her way to Paris, leaving her infant son with his father, who in turn sent his son to live with the boy's grandparents in Suez. With the failure of her marriage, Anne-Marie began dabbling in acting and prostitution and she became a heavy user of both cocaine and opium.

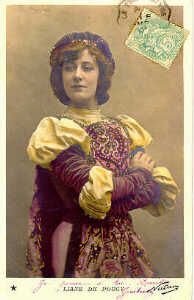
A postcard depicting Liane de Pougy.

She began her career as a courtesan with Valtesse de la Bigne, who taught Anne-Marie the profession. De Pougy felt she was capable but not overly cerebral, and described herself as "vain but not a fool". Anne-Marie cultivated an interest in paintings, books and poetry, but avoided intellectual depth, which she considered dull. She preferred café-concerts and popular songs to William Shakespeare or Richard Wagner, and made minor appearances in the chorus of Folies Bergère in Paris, in St. Petersburg, and cabaret clubs in Rome and the French Riviera. She was a conscientious bookkeeper.

== Paris ==
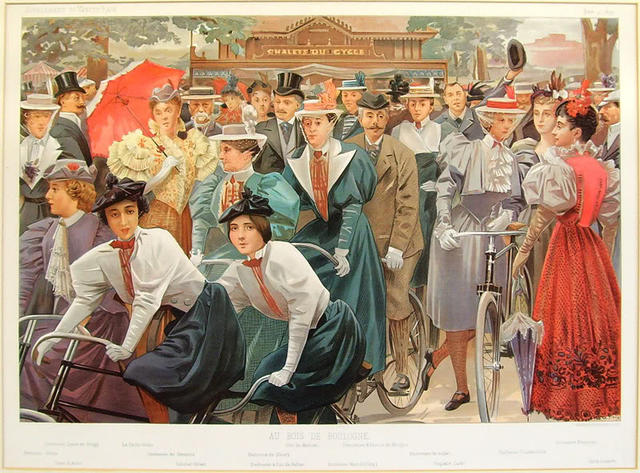
Pougy, Otero, and Cléo de Mérode appear in a fashionable crowd in the Bois de Boulogne drawn by Guth, 1897

After moving to Paris, from her position at the Folies she became a noted demimondaine, and a rival of "La Belle Otero". She took her last name from one of her paramours, a Comte or Vicomte de Pougy, whilst other lovers included Mathilde de Morny and Émilienne d'Alençon. Actress Sarah Bernhardt, faced with the task of teaching Liane to act, advised her that when she was on stage, it would be best to keep her "pretty mouth shut". Liane became so well known as a performer at the Folies Bergère that the 1890s English female impersonator Herbert Charles Pollitt referenced her in his drag name Diane de Rougy.

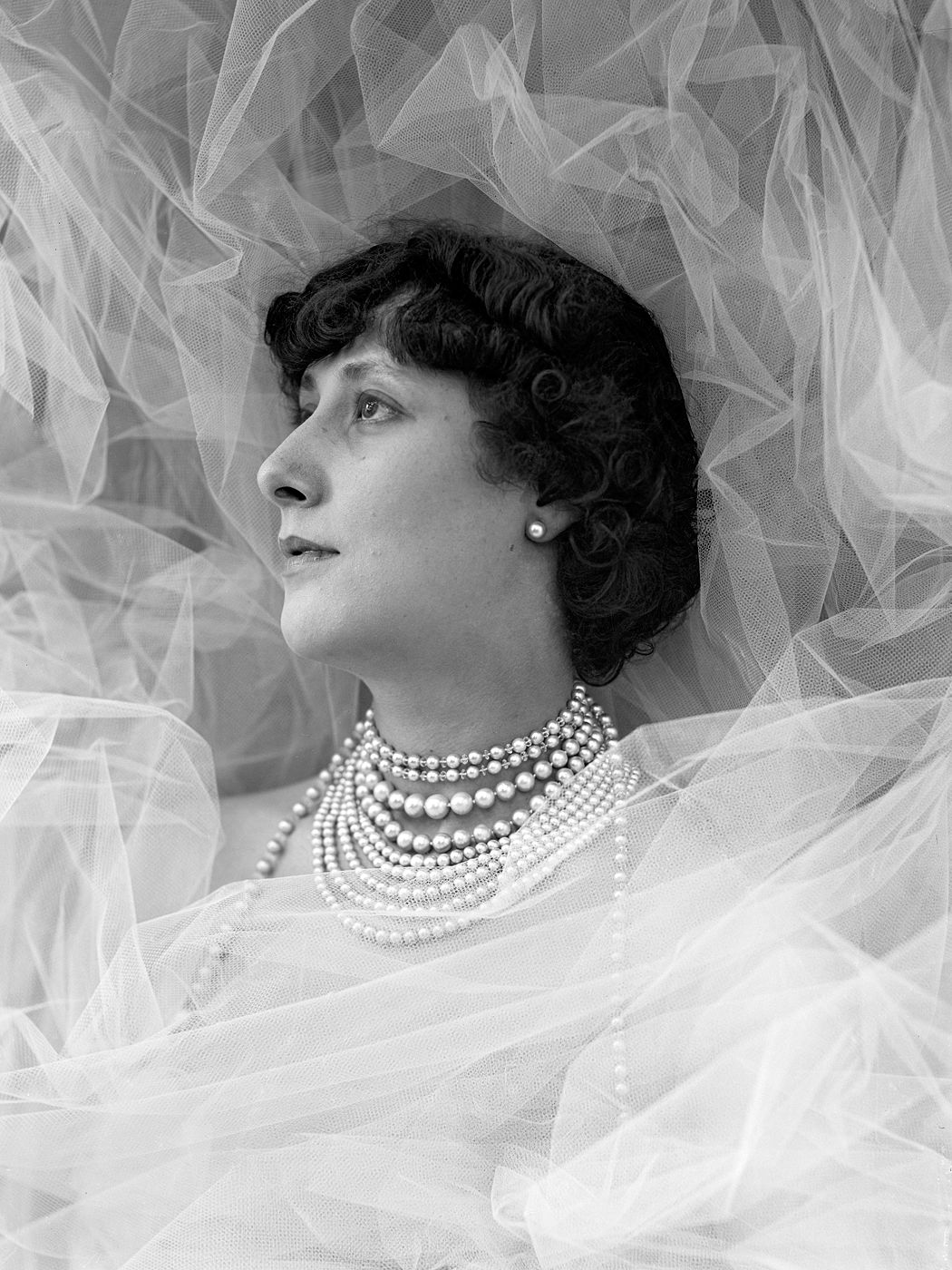
by Paul Nadar

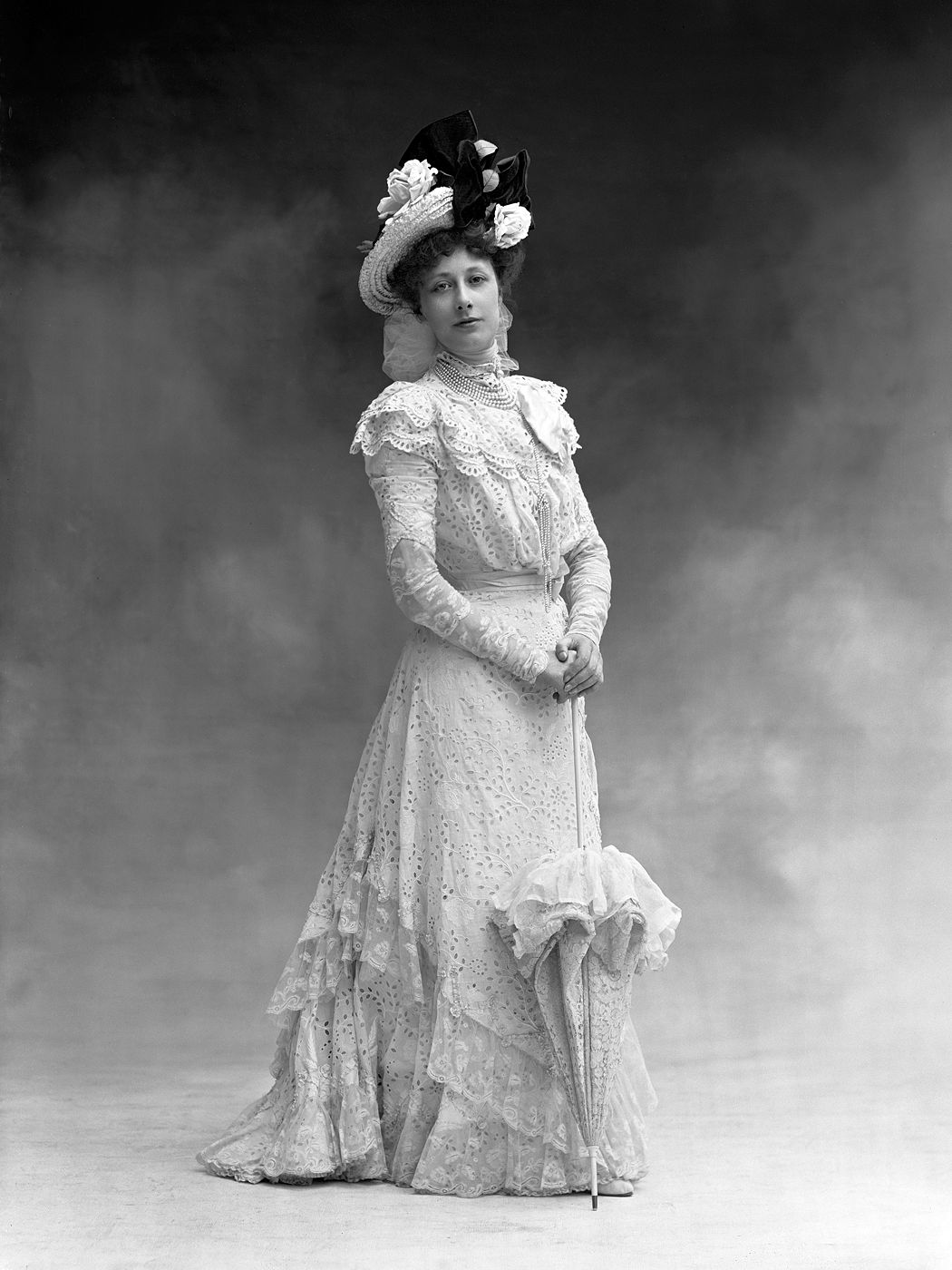
by Paul Nadar

Pougy's lesbian affair with writer Natalie Clifford Barney is recorded in Pougy's novel Idylle Saphique, published in 1901 (later published in Spain in translation by the poet Luis Antonio de Villena). In 1899, after seeing Pougy at a dance hall in Paris, Barney presented herself at her residence in a page costume and announced that she was a "page of love" sent by Sappho. Although Pougy was one of the most famous women in France at the time, constantly sought after by wealthy and titled men, Barney's audacity charmed and seduced her. Of their liaison, Pougy notes: "That was in the days of the Amazon's youth, and of my own. We were passionate, rebels against a woman's lot, voluptuous and cerebral little apostles, rather poetical, full of illusions and dreams. We loved long hair, pretty breasts, pouts, simpers, charm, grace; not boyishness." Their amorous relationship lasted less than a year and their love letters reflect the passions they shared and also the conflicts. The two were said to have had deep feelings for each other for the remainder of their lives, although their relationship was not without its ups and downs. In Women Lovers, Barney recounts the bittersweet romantic rivalry she shared with Pougy in a "barely disguised roman à clef" in which "Barney, the dashing Italian baroness Mimi Franchetti, and the beautiful French courtesan Liane de Pougy share erotic liaisons that break all taboos and end in devastation as one unexpectedly becomes the “third woman.” For her part, Pougy depicts their relationship in My Blue Notebooks as one that grew more distant over the years, possibly ending in 1934 when the two ran into each other in Toulon, but did not exchange a word.

Although best known for her Idylle Saphique and her posthumous Notebooks, Pougy authored several other works critics label "autofiction." Her first two novels, L'Insaisissable [The Elusive One] (1898) and Myrrhille, ou la Mauvaise part [Myrrhille, or the Lesser Portion] (1899) are "courtesan novels," "a sub-genre of popular fiction by renowned demi-mondaines in France from the Second empire through the Belle Époque, who challenged in their novels Alexandre Dumas's portrayal of Marguerite in his La Dame aux camélias (1848), claiming that his work not only promotes unrealistic stereotypes of courtesans but also harmful ones." L'Insaississable, Pougy's first novel, depicts Josiane de Valneige's quick rise to fame in Paris and "features much braggadocio" about this "grande courtisane" who "fails to find happiness through love." In her second novel, she "depicts a weary demi-mondaine much less arrogant and self-assured than Josiane and much more sensitive to prejudices, against not only courtesans but women in general. Women have 'la mauvaise part' [the lesser portion], and are exploited and broken mentally and physically by men." Pougy's subsequent two novels, Idylle saphique (1901) and Les Sensations de Mlle de la Bringue (1904) make intertextual references to Émile Zola's Nana (1880). "In both works, de Pougy vividly depicts the dangers, harassment, humiliation, and psychological damage endured by sex workers, an important but harsh reality never described by Zola and his coterie. In addition to the counter-discourse in Idylle, de Pougy's writing also serves as a form of therapy for working through trauma. In Sensations, de Pougy recounts her alter ego demi-mondaine's rise to the top and subsequent retirement in Brittany, which is an optimistic ending on her part because it allows her courtesan heroine to not only avoid death but also escape the drudgery of prostitution." According to Jean Chalon, Pougy met an American actress named Eva Palmer through Barney and fashioned her protagonist in Yvée Lester (1906) and Yvée Jourdan (1908) after Palmer. Neither novel evokes any demi-mondaines (although a character named Flossie appears) and Chalon compares the novels to texts by the Countess of Ségur, the author of several tales destined for children. The Catalogue général of the French National Library also lists Pougy as the author of L'enlizement, a one-act play (1900), and Ecce homo! D'ici et de là, a collection of short stories from 1903.

== Second marriage and later life ==
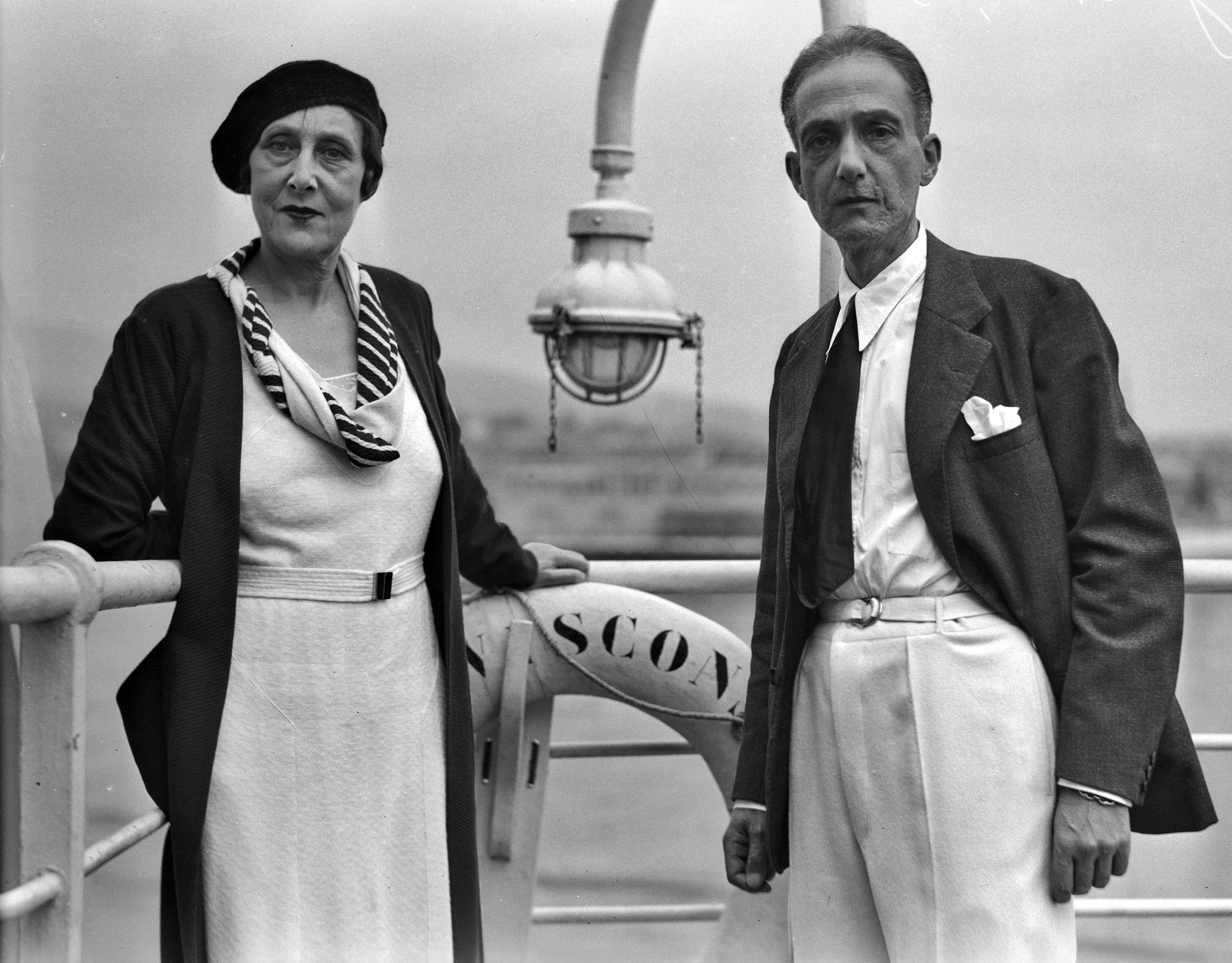
With Georges Ghika, 1932

Upon her marriage to Prince Georges Ghika on 8 June 1910 she became Princess Ghika; eighteen years into their marriage, her husband left her for another woman, but the following year he came back to her. Pougy does not explain in her Notebooks the circumstances surrounding his return.

Her son's death as an aviator in World War I turned her more deeply towards Catholicism. After her husband and she stumbled onto the Asylum of Saint Agnes while driving through Savoy in 1928, she became deeply involved in this institution devoted to the care of children with birth defects. Thanks to Pougy's fundraising efforts, Coco Chanel became the "leading benefactress" of the asylum.

The couple moved to Lausanne, Switzerland, during World War II where they reconnected with Fr Alexander Rzewuski, a Dominican priest who became "her confidant from whom she hoped to get help for the advancement of her religious and spiritual life." Pougy became a Dominican tertiary as Sister Anne-Mary after her husband's death.

She died in Lausanne on 26 December 1950 and was buried in the enclosure of the sisters of the Sainte-Agnès asylum in Saint-Martin-le-Vinoux.

== Legacy ==
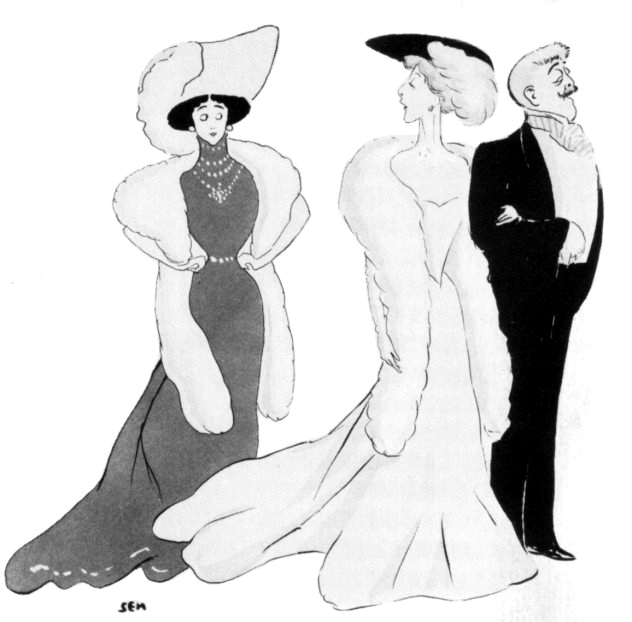
Caricatures of Cléo de Mérode (left), Liane de Pougy (center) and Jean Lorrain (right) by Sem (Georges Goursat) circa 1914

In 1977, her memoirs, titled Mes cahiers bleus, the first French edition, with a preface by Dominican priest Alex-Ceslas Rzewuski, was published by Plon.

In 1979, the first English edition, titled My Blue Notebooks, was translated by Diana Athill and published by Harper & Row and Andre Deutsch.; a second edition followed in 2002 by J.P. Tarcher/Putnam. Quality Paperback Book Club bought the rights and the book sold very well.

In 1998, an excerpt from the diaries covering the year 1920 was published in the 1998 anthology, The Virago Book of Wanderlust & Dreams, edited by Lisa St. Aubin de Terán.

In 2021, Virginie Girod wrote the preface to the 2021 edition published in Paris by Nouveau monde.

== Works ==
Fiction

- L'Insaisissable [The Elusive One] (1898)
- Myrrhille, ou la Mauvaise part [Myrrhille, or the Lesser Portion] (1899)
- L'enlizement, a one-act play (1900)
- Idylle Saphique,(1901)
- Ecce homo! D'ici et de là (1903)
- Les Sensations de Mlle de la Bringue (1904)
- Yvée Lester (1906)
- Yvée Jourdan (1908)

Non-fiction

- Mes cahiers bleus [My Blue Notebooks] (memoirs)
