= Nikos Papatakis =

Greek filmmaker (1918–2010)

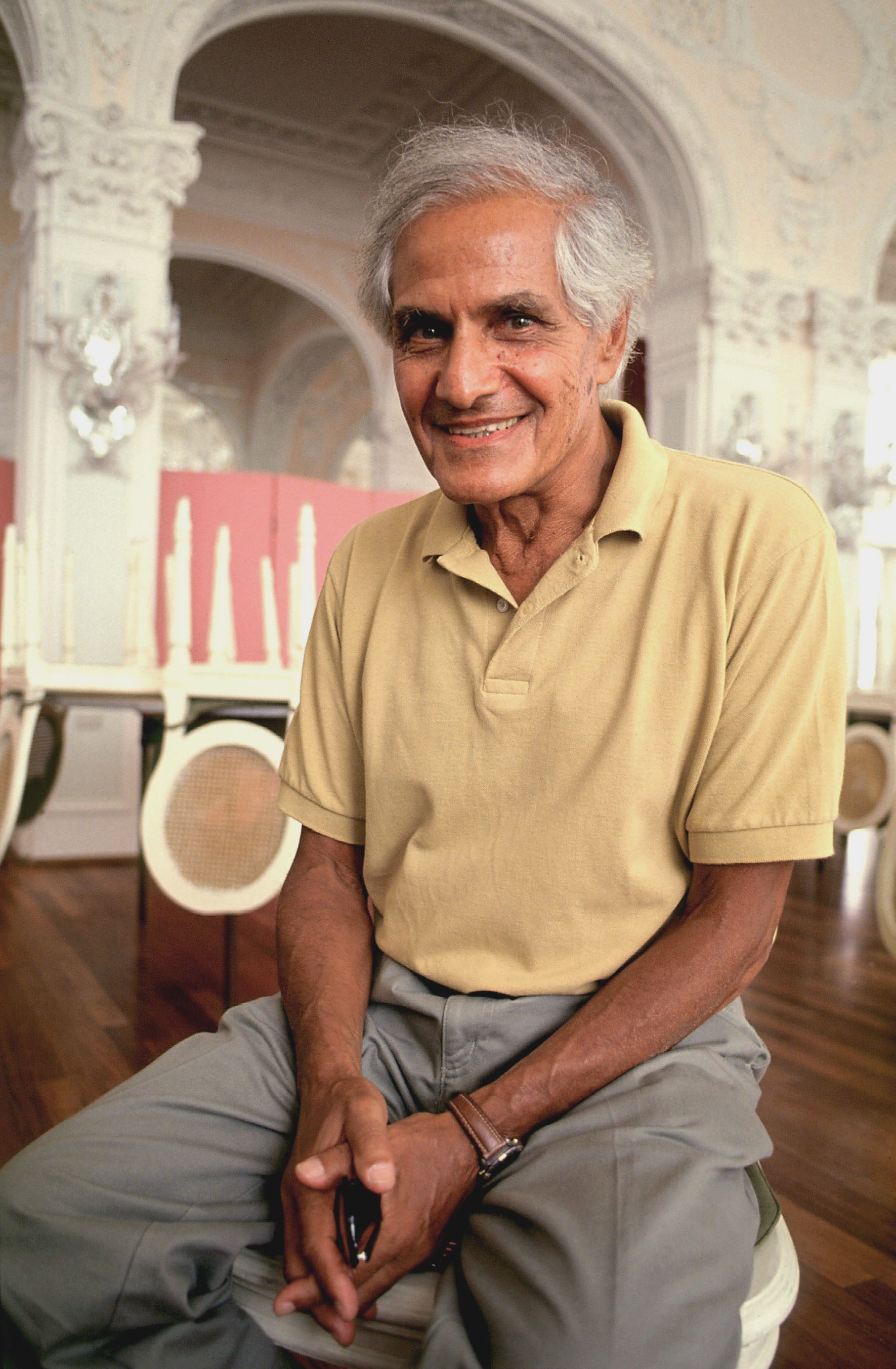
- Born: 5 July 1918; Addis Ababa, Ethiopian Empire
- Died: 17 December 2010 (aged 92); Paris, France
- Other names: Nico Papatakis
- Occupations: Film director, film producer, screenwriter, actor
- Years active: 1950–2004
- Spouses: Anouk Aimée (m. 1951; div. 1954) Olga Karlatos (m. 1967; div. 1982)
- Children: 2

Nico Papatakis (Greek: Νίκος Παπατάκης; 5 July 1918 – 17 December 2010) was an Ethiopian-born Greek filmmaker, who lived in France.

== Early life and career ==
Papatakis was born to Greek parents in Addis Ababa, Ethiopia and spent his early years between Ethiopia and Greece. In 1939, he established himself in Paris and worked as an extra in films. Eventually, he owned the famous Parisian club 'La Rose Rouge' where performers included singer Juliette Gréco.

In 1957, Papatakis moved to New York City, where he met John Cassavetes, and became co-producer of Cassavetes' Shadows (1959). In New York he also met German singer Nico, who had adopted his first name as her stage name several years earlier while modelling for photographer Herbert Tobias. Tobias was in love with Papatakis at the time and had given her the stage name Nico in honor of him. Papatakis and Nico ended up living together between 1959 and 1961. It was Papatakis who suggested Nico pursue a career in music and enrolled her in her first singing lessons.

In 1963, his first film, Les Abysses, enjoyed a "Succès de scandale" and was entered into the 1963 Cannes Film Festival which refused to show it. In 1967, he directed another film, Oi Voskoi (The Shepherds in Greek), which starred his wife at the time, Olga Karlatos. During the Algerian War, he was active in the Front de Liberation National. He returned to filmmaking in 1987 with a film in Greek, I Photografia (The Photograph). His last movie was Walking a Tightrope (1992).

== Personal life ==
Papatakis was married to actress Anouk Aimée from 1951 to 1954 and with her he had a daughter, Manuela Papatakis, born in 1951. He lived with Nico between 1959 and 1961. He was then married to actress Olga Karlatos from 1967 to 1982, with whom he had a son, Serge Papatakis, born in 1967.

Papatakis died in Paris on 17 December 2010.

== Films ==
- Gloria mundi (version 2004)
- Les Équilibristes (1992), Walking a Tightrope (English title)
- I Photographia (1987), La Photo, The Photograph (Australia: festival title)
- Gloria mundi (1976)
- Oi Voskoi (1967), Les Pâtres du désordre (France), Thanos and Despina (USA), The Shepherds of Calamity (Europe).
- Les Abysses (1963) (as Nico Papatakis)

As actor

- The Red Rose (1951)
