= Martine Chevallier =

French actress

- Born: 1949 (age 76–77); Gap, Hautes-Alpes, France
- Occupation: Actress
- Years active: 1968–present
- Spouse: August Coppola (1996-2009)

Martine Chevallier (born 1949 in Gap, Hautes-Alpes, France) is a French actress.

== Career ==
Martine Chevallier joined the Conservatoire national supérieur d’art dramatique in the class of Antoine Vitez and won the first prize in 1974.

In 1986, she joined the Comédie-Française and has been a sociétaire since 1988.

== Theatre ==
Year	Title	Author	Director	Notes
1968–69	Much Ado About Nothing	William Shakespeare	Jorge Lavelli	
1969	In the Mesh	Jean-Paul Sartre	Jean Mercure & Serge Peyrat	
1969	Brise caillou	Laurence Imbert	Luce Clament	
1970	Tard dans la nuit	Guillaume Kergourlay	Alberto Rody	
1973	Viendra-t-il un autre été ?	Jean-Jacques Varoujean	Jacques Spiesser	
1976	Le Cid	Pierre Corneille	Francis Huster	
1976	Spring Awakening	Frank Wedekind	Pierre Romans	
1976–77	L'Échange	Paul Claudel	Anne Delbée	
1977	The Robbers	Friedrich Schiller	Anne Delbée	
1978	L'Aigle à deux têtes	Jean Cocteau	Jean-Pierre Dusséaux	
1979	Ardèle ou la Marguerite	Jean Anouilh	Pierre Mondy & Roland Piétri	
1980	The Satin Slipper	Paul Claudel	Jean-Louis Barrault	
1981	The Cherry Orchard	Anton Chekhov	Peter Brook	
1981	On loge la nuit-café à l'eau	Jean-Michel Ribes	Jean-Michel Ribes	
1982	Amadeus	Peter Shaffer	Roman Polanski	
1982	Prometheus	Heiner Müller	Guy Rétoré	
1983	Les affaires sont les affaires	Octave Mirbeau	Pierre Dux	
1984	Le Sablier	Nina Companeez	Nina Companeez	
1984	Savannah Bay	Marguerite Duras	Marguerite Duras	
1985	Le Cid	Pierre Corneille	Francis Huster	
1987	Esther	Jean Racine	Françoise Seigner	
1987	A Kind of Alaska	Harold Pinter	Bernard Murat	
1987	One for the Road	Harold Pinter	Bernard Murat	
1988	Nicomède	Pierre Corneille	Françoise Seigner	
1988	The Trojan War Will Not Take Place	Jean Giraudoux	Raymond Gérôme	
1989	The Misanthrope	Molière	Simon Eine	
1989-90	Lorenzaccio	Alfred de Musset	Georges Lavaudant	
1989-90	Life of Galileo	Bertolt Brecht	Antoine Vitez	
1991	Iphigénie	Jean Racine	Yánnis Kókkos	
1992	Caligula	Albert Camus	Youssef Chahine	
1992	Amy Robsart	Victor Hugo	Anne-André Reille	
1992	Life of Galileo	Bertolt Brecht	Antoine Vitez	
1993	Le Silence	Nathalie Sarraute	Jacques Lassalle	
1993	La Glycine	Serge Rezvani	Jean Lacornerie	
1993	The Wild Duck	Henrik Ibsen	Alain Françon	
1994	Hamlet	William Shakespeare	Georges Lavaudant	
1994	Les Précieuses ridicules	Molière	Jean-Luc Boutté	
1994	L'Impromptu de Versailles	Molière	Jean-Luc Boutté	
1995	Phèdre	Jean Racine	Anne Delbée	
1995	Bajazet	Jean Racine	Éric Vigner	
1995	The Misanthrope	Molière	Simon Eine	
1997	Bérénice	Jean Racine	Jean Martinez	
1997	Les Reines	Normand Chaurette	Joël Jouanneau	
1997	La Tête dans les nuages	Marc Delaruelle	Jean Bouchaud	
1998	Rodogune	Pierre Corneille	Jacques Rosner	
1999	Amants	Octave Mirbeau	Jean Bouchaud	
1999	Vieux Ménage	Octave Mirbeau	Jean Bouchaud	
1999	Heartbreak House	George Bernard Shaw	Michel Dubois	
1999	L'Impromptu de Versailles	Molière	Jean-Luc Boutté	
1999	George Dandin ou le Mari confondu	Molière	Catherine Hiegel	
2000–01	Le Bourgeois gentilhomme	Molière	Jean-Louis Benoît	
2001	Helga la folle	László Darvasi	Balázs Géra	
2001	Pluie de cendres	Laurent Gaudé	Michel Favory	
2001	Le Bourreau de Longwy	Kornél Hamvai	Jean-Loup Rivière	
2002	La Légende des siècles	Victor Hugo	Jean-Loup Rivière	
2002	Extermination du peuple	Werner Schwab	Philippe Adrien	
2003	The Forest	Alexander Ostrovsky	Pyotr Fomenko	
2004	Le Théâtre de...	Paul Andreu	Jean-Pierre Jourdain	
2004	Un auteur, un acteur...	Nathalie Nabert	Nathalie Nabert	
2005	The Bacchae	Euripides	André Wilms	
2005	Le Théâtre de...	Michel Cournot	Jean-Pierre Jourdain	
2006	Il campiello	Carlo Goldoni	Jacques Lassalle	
2007	Le Retour au désert	Bernard-Marie Koltès	Muriel Mayette-Holtz	Molière Award for Best Actress
2007–08	The Marriage of Figaro	Pierre Beaumarchais	Christophe Rauck	
2008	Penthesilea	Heinrich von Kleist	Jean Liermier	
2009	Il campiello	Carlo Goldoni	Jacques Lassalle	
2009	La grande magia	Eduardo De Filippo	Dan Jemmett	
2009–11	Ubu Roi	Alfred Jarry	Jean-Pierre Vincent	
2010	The Birds	Aristophanes	Alfredo Arias	
2011	Bérénice	Jean Racine	Muriel Mayette-Holtz	
2012	The Marriage of Figaro	Pierre Beaumarchais	Christophe Rauck	
2012–13	The Human Voice	Jean Cocteau	Marc Paquien	
2013	Le Système Ribadier	Georges Feydeau	Zabou Breitman	
2014	Cabaret Barbara	Barbara	Béatrice Agenin	
2014	A Midsummer Night's Dream	William Shakespeare	Muriel Mayette-Holtz	
2015	Les Estivants	Maxim Gorky	Gérard Desarthe	
2015–16	The Father	August Strindberg	Arnaud Desplechin	
2016	Le Cerf et le Chien	Marcel Aymé	Véronique Vella	
2018	Poussières	Lars Norén	Lars Norén	
2019	Julius Caesar	William Shakespeare	Rodolphe Dana	
2019–20	Hors la loi	Pauline Bureau	Pauline Bureau	
2021–23	Pour autrui	Pauline Bureau	Pauline Bureau	

== Filmography ==
Year	Title	Role	Director	Notes
1970	The Mad Heart		Jean-Gabriel Albicocco	
1970	Elise, or Real Life	Marie-Louise	Michel Drach	
1971	Le malade imaginaire	Angélique	Claude Santelli	TV movie
1972	Les gens de Mogador	Amélia Vernet	Robert Mazoyer	TV series (3 episodes)
1973	La ligne d'ombre	Marie	Georges Franju	TV movie
1973	Jean Pinot, médecin d'aujourd'hui	Annie Pinot	Michel Fermaud	TV series (11 episodes)
1974	Plaies et bosses	Kale Lackan	Yves-André Hubert	TV movie
1974	Opéra pour Baudelaire	Marie Daubrun	Dominique Delouche	TV movie
1975	La chaise vide	Anne Foucault	Pierre Jallaud	
1976	Première neige	Jeanne	Claude Santelli	TV movie
1977	La foire		Roland Vincent	TV movie
1978	Les chemins de l'exil	Sophie d'Houdetot	Claude Goretta	TV movie
1979	Les dames de la côte	Blanche Pommier	Nina Companeez	TV mini-series
1980	Eclipse sur un ancien chemin vers Compostelle	Isaure	Bernard Férié	
1980	Légitime défense	Catherine	Claude Grinberg	TV movie
1981	Adèle ou la marguerite	Nathalie	Pierre Desfons	TV movie
1981	Mémoires de deux jeunes mariées	Renée de Maucome	Marcel Cravenne	TV movie
1981	Arcole ou la terre promise	Annette	Marcel Moussy	TV mini-series
1982	Mozart	Constanze Mozart	Marcel Bluwal	TV mini-series
1983	Histoire de Thérèse	Thérèse Delombre	Philippe Pilard	TV movie
1984	En l'absence du peintre		Marie-Geneviève Ripeau	
1985	The Children	Nicole	Marguerite Duras	
1985	Les enquêtes du commissaire Maigret	Renée Planchon	Pierre Bureau	TV series (1 episode)
1988	Frequent Death	Marie	Élisabeth Rappeneau	
1989	Le masque	Hélène Villedieu	Bruno Gantillon	TV series (1 episode)
1993	Une femme sans histoire	Simone	Alain Tasma	TV movie
1995	Jefferson in Paris	Mademoiselle Contat	James Ivory	
2001	L'aîné des Ferchaux	Eva	Bernard Stora	TV movie
2002	Sur le bout des doigts	Josette	Yves Angelo	
2002	P.J.	Eliane Wilmart	Gérard Vergez	TV series (1 episode)
2002	Juliette Lesage, médecine pour tous	Martine Maillant	Christian François	TV series (1 episode)
2003	Le bison (et sa voisine Dorine)	Madame Cabut	Isabelle Nanty	
2003	Violence des échanges en milieu tempéré	Suzanne Delmas	Jean-Marc Moutout	
2003	Navarro	Viviane Beraud	Patrick Jamain	TV series (1 episode)
2004	La confiance règne	Françoise Térion	Étienne Chatiliez	
2005	Foon	Miss Smokingkills	Mika Tard, Benoît Pétré, ...	
2005	Burnt Out	Julie	Fabienne Godet	
2005	Entre ses mains	Claire's mother	Anne Fontaine	
2005	Celle qui reste	Françoise	Virginie Sauveur	TV movie
2006	Tell No One	Martine Laurentin	Guillaume Canet	
2006	Mauvaise foi	Lucie Breitmann	Roschdy Zem	
2006	The Page Turner	Jackie Onfray	Denis Dercourt	
2006	Blame It on Fidel	Bonne Maman	Julie Gavras	
2006	Don't Worry, I'm Fine	The first nurse	Philippe Lioret	
2006	Gaspard le bandit	Amandine de Varade	Benoît Jacquot	TV movie
2006	L'État de Grace	Lise	Pascal Chaumeil	TV mini-series
2008	La veuve tatouée	Colette	Virginie Sauveur	TV movie
2008	Elles et Moi	Blanche de Montellier	Bernard Stora	TV mini-series
2012	Farewell, My Queen	Madame de la Tour Du Pin	Benoît Jacquot	
2012	Spiral	Judge Evelyne Renaud	Virginie Sauveur	TV series (1 episode)
2013	La dernière campagne	Bernadette Chirac	Bernard Stora	TV movie
2014	Not My Type	Clément's mother	Lucas Belvaux	
2014	La forêt	Raissa	Arnaud Desplechin	TV movie
2016	Fleur de Tonnerre	Sister Athanase	Stéphanie Pillonca	
2017	Je suis coupable	Josée	Christophe Lamotte	TV movie
2019	Two of Us	Madeleine Girard	Filippo Meneghetti	Lumière Award for Best Actress; Nominated - César Award for Best Actress; Nominated - Women Film Critics Circle - Best Screen Couple
2019	Perfect Nanny	The lady in the park	Lucie Borleteau	
2019	La part du soupçon	Dorothée Vilmorin	Christophe Lamotte	TV movie
2021	The Man in the Basement	Attorney Rivière	Philippe Le Guay	
2021	The Mad Women's Ball	Grandma Cléry	Mélanie Laurent	
2022	La montagne	Pierre's mother	Thomas Salvador	
2022	La vengeance sans visage	Fabienne Mornas	Claude-Michel Rome	TV movie
2022	L'île aux 30 cercueils	Soizick Maroux	Frédéric Mermoud	TV mini-series
2023	Pleure pas Gabriel	Blandine	Mathilde Chavanne	Short
2023	Les secrets du Finistère	Katell Mahé	François Basset & Anne Pejean	TV movie
2023	Alphonse	Elise Duthi	Nicolas Bedos	TV series (6 episodes)
2024	Tu ne tueras point	Irène	Leslie Gwinner	TV movie
2024	Le beau rôle	Nanette	Victor Rodenbach	
2025	Maudits	Rose	Chloé Micout	TV movie
2025	Les saisons	Mado		TV series (4 episodes)
