= Catherine Hiegel =

French actress

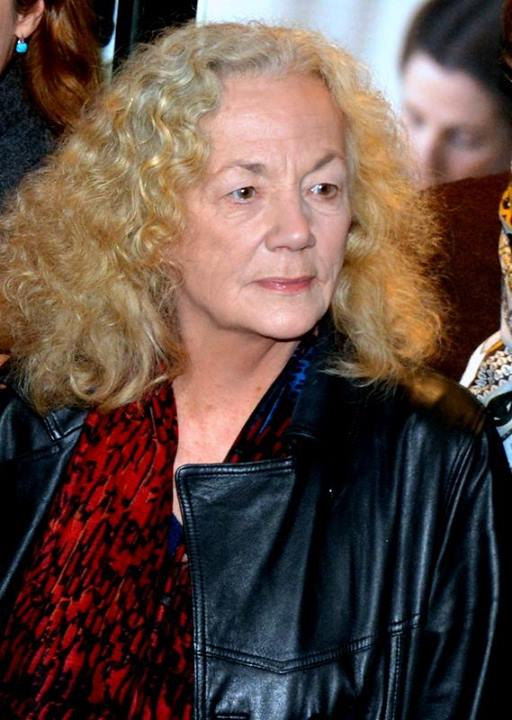
- Hiegel in 2013
- Born: 10 December 1946 (age 79); Montreuil, Seine-Saint-Denis, France
- Occupations: Actress, comedian, director
- Years active: 1965-
- Children: 1
- Relatives: Pierre Bellemare (uncle)

Catherine Hiegel (born 10 December 1946) is a French actress, comedian and director.

== Personal life ==
Catherine Hiegel is the daughter of Pierre Hiegel, radio host, music critic, radio producer and artistic director of French houses of discs. She is also the niece of Pierre Bellemare.

== Career ==
At ten, she played Cosette in a radio adaptation of Les Misérables, where her father played Jean Valjean. She sang in 1956 with André Claveau, Viens danser avec papa.

On the advice of her father, she stopped school to learn comedy. She took lessons with Raymond Girard and Jacques Charon, and began her career on stage to the Théâtre des Bouffes-Parisiens with Cactus Flower, alongside Jean Poiret and Sophie Desmarets. She joined the French National Academy of Dramatic Arts in the classes of Jean Marchat then Lise Delamare, and also attended classes of Jean-Laurent Cochet.

She joined the Comédie-Française in 1969. She worked with directors as varied as Philippe Adrien, Patrice Chéreau, Dario Fo, Jorge Lavelli, Jean-Paul Roussillon, in the classical and contemporary repertoire. She became Dean of the troupe after the death of Christine Fersen in 2008.

Catherine Hiegel is also a professor to the CNSAD for thirteen years.

She have won 2 Molière Award on 9 nominations.

== Theater ==
=== As actress ===
Year	Title	Author	Director	Notes
1965	Cactus Flower	Pierre Barillet & Jean-Pierre Gredy	Jacques Charon	
1968	Gugusse	Marcel Achard	Michel Roux	
1968	L'Amour propre	Marc Camoletti	Marc Camoletti	
1969	Le Dépit amoureux	Molière	Robert Manuel	
1969	Les Italiens à Paris	Charles Charras & André Gille	Jean Le Poulain	
1969	The Imaginary Invalid	Molière	Robert Manuel	
1969	The Game of Love and Chance	Pierre de Marivaux	Maurice Escande	
1970-73	George Dandin ou le Mari confondu	Molière	Jean-Paul Roussillon	
1970-71	Dom Juan	Molière	Antoine Bourseiller	
1971-72	Les Femmes Savantes	Molière	Jean Meyer	
1971-73	The Imaginary Invalid	Molière	Jean-Laurent Cochet	
1971-73	L'Impromptu de Versailles	Molière	Pierre Dux	
1972	Electra	Jean Giraudoux		
1972	The Miser	Molière	Jean-Paul Roussillon	
1972	Le Dindon	Georges Feydeau	Jean Meyer	
1972	Cœur à deux	Guy Foissy	Jean-Pierre Miquel	
1972	Cyrano de Bergerac	Edmond Rostand	Jacques Charon	
1972	Les Fausses Confidences	Pierre de Marivaux	Jean Piat	
1972	La Troupe du Roy Hommage à Molière	Molière	Paul-Émile Deiber	
1972-74	Le Ouallou	Jacques Audiberti	André Reybaz	
1973	Port-Royal	Henry de Montherlant	Jean Meyer	
1973	Amphitryon	Molière	Jean Meyer	
1973	L'Île des esclaves	Pierre de Marivaux	Simon Eine	
1973	Les Femmes Savantes	Molière	Jean Piat	
1973	Les Précieuses ridicules	Molière	Jean-Louis Thamin	
1973-74	Chez les Titch	Louis Calaferte	Jean-Pierre Miquel	
1974	Henry IV	Luigi Pirandello	Raymond Rouleau	
1974	Pericles, Prince of Tyre	William Shakespeare	Terry Hands	
1974-75	Ondine	Jean Giraudoux	Raymond Rouleau	
1975	The Misanthrope	Pierre Corneille	Simon Eine	
1976	Cyrano de Bergerac	Edmond Rostand	Jean-Paul Roussillon	
1976	Hommage à Jean Cocteau	Jean Cocteau	André Fraigneau	
1976	Mr Puntila and his Man Matti	Bertolt Brecht	Guy Rétoré	
1976-80	Exit the King	Eugène Ionesco	Jorge Lavelli	
1977	La Navette	Henry Becque	Simon Eine	
1977	Les Fourberies de Scapin	Molière	Jacques Échantillon	
1977-79	Les Acteurs de bonne foi	Pierre de Marivaux	Jean-Luc Boutté	
1978-79	La villeggiatura	Carlo Goldoni	Giorgio Strehler	
1979	La Tour de Babel	Fernando Arrabal	Jorge Lavelli	
1979-80	Three Sisters	Anton Chekhov	Jean-Paul Roussillon	
1980	Simul et singulis		Jacques Destoop	
1980	The Madwoman of Chaillot	Jean Giraudoux	Michel Fagadau	
1980-81	Creditors	August Strindberg	Jacques Baillon	
1981	Les Corbeaux	Henry Becque	Jean-Pierre Vincent	
1981	La Dame de chez Maxim	Georges Feydeau	Jean-Paul Roussillon	
1981-83	The Mistress of the Inn	Carlo Goldoni	Jacques Lassalle	
1982	The Enchanted	Jean Giraudoux	Jacques Sereys	
1983	Les Estivants	Maxime Gorki	Jacques Lassalle	
1983	The Madwoman of Chaillot	Jean Giraudoux	Michel Fagadau	
1984	Sarcasme	Yves Laplace	Hervé Loichemol	
1985	L'Impresario de Smyrne	Carlo Goldoni	Jean-Luc Boutté	
1985	Le Bourgeois gentilhomme	Molière	Jean-Luc Boutté	
1986	Quai Ouest	Bernard-Marie Koltès	Patrice Chéreau	
1988	Une visite inopportune	Copi	Jorge Lavelli	
1989	La Veillée	Lars Norén	Jorge Lavelli	Prix du Syndicat de la critique - Best Actress; Nominated - Molière Award for Best Actress
1989	Torquato Tasso	Johann Wolfgang von Goethe	Bruno Bayen	
1989	Michelet ou le Don des larmes	Jules Michelet	Simone Benmussa	
1990-92	Greek	Steven Berkoff	Jorge Lavelli	
1990-92	Le Médecin malgré lui	Molière	Dario Fo	
1991	The Father	August Strindberg	Patrice Kerbrat	
1992	La Serva amorosa	Carlo Goldoni	Jacques Lassalle	Nominated - Molière Award for Best Actress
1992	Au salon des orchidées	Mona Thomas	Catherine Hiegel	
1993	Le Faiseur	Honoré de Balzac	Jean-Paul Roussillon	
1994	Maman revient pauvre orphelin	Jean-Claude Grumberg	Philippe Adrien	
1995	Le Shaga	Marguerite Duras	Christian Rist	
1996	Arloc	Serge Kribus	Jorge Lavelli	
1997	The Maids	Jean Genet	Philippe Adrien	
1997	Les Reines	Normand Chaurette	Joël Jouanneau	
1998	Le Petit Maroc	Daniel Besnehard	Georges Werler	
1998	Les Présidentes	Werner Schwab	Marcela Salivarova-Bideau	
1998	Mother Courage and Her Children	Bertolt Brecht	Jorge Lavelli	
1999	Le Chant de la baleine	Yves Lebeau	Jacques Rosner	
1999-2000	La Concession Pilgrim	Pablo Bergel & Yves Ravey	Joël Jouanneau	
2001	Anne-Marie	Philippe Minyana	Philippe Minyana	
2001-02	The Imaginary Invalid	Molière	Claude Stratz	
2002	Le Théâtre de...	Bertrand Tavernier	Bertrand Tavernier	
2002-04	Savannah bay	Marguerite Duras	Éric Vigner	
2002-04	Les Papiers d'Aspern	Jean Pavans	Jacques Lassalle	
2003	Homebody/Kabul	Tony Kushner	Jorge Lavelli	
2005	Tartuffe	Molière	Marcel Bozonnet	
2005	Embrasser les ombres	Lars Norén	Joël Jouanneau	Nominated - Molière Award for Best Actress
2005	J'étais dans ma maison et j'attendais que la pluie vienne	Jean-Luc Lagarce	Joël Jouanneau	Prix du Syndicat de la critique - Best Actress
2006	Objet perdu	Daniel Keene	Didier Bezace	
2006	La Maison des morts	Philippe Minyana	Robert Cantarella	
2006	The Imaginary Invalid	Molière	Claude Stratz	
2007	Le Retour au désert	Bernard-Marie Koltès	Muriel Mayette	Molière Award for Best Supporting Actress
2007	Une confrérie de farceurs	Bernard Faivre	François Chattot & Jean-Louis Hourdin	
2007-09	Il campiello	Carlo Goldoni	Jacques Lassalle	
2007-09	Les Précieuses ridicules	Molière	Dan Jemmett	
2008	Bonheur ?	Emmanuel Darley	Andrés Lima	
2008	La Petite dans la forêt profonde	Ovid	Marcial Di Fonzo Bo	
2009	The Merry Wives of Windsor	William Shakespeare	Andrés Lima	
2010	La Mère	Florian Zeller	Marcial Di Fonzo Bo	Molière Award for Best Actress
2010	The Birds	Aristophanes	Alfredo Arias	
2010	Mystère Bouffe et fabulages	Dario Fo	Muriel Mayette	
2011	Tout doit disparaître	Éric Pessan	Frédéric Maragnani	
2011	The Sweet Hereafter	Russell Banks	Emmanuel Meirieu	
2011	Le Babil des classes dangereuses	Valère Novarina	Denis Podalydès	
2012	Le Fils	Jon Fosse	Jacques Lassalle	
2012	Moi je crois pas !	Jean-Claude Grumberg	Charles Tordjman	
2013	Whistling psyche	Sebastian Barry	Julie Brochen	
2013	Le prix des boîtes	Frédéric Pommier	Jorge Lavelli	
2013-14	Dramuscules	Thomas Bernhard	Catherine Hiegel	
2014	Une femme	Philippe Minyana	Marcial Di Fonzo Bo	
2014	Anna et Martha	Dea Loher	Robert Cantarella	
2014-15	La mère	Florian Zeller	Marcial Di Fonzo Bo	
2015	Retour au désert	Bernard-Marie Koltès	Arnaud Meunier	Nominated - Molière Award for Best Actress
2017	Votre maman	Jean-Claude Grumberg	Charles Tordjman	
2017	Family Resemblances	Agnès Jaoui & Jean-Pierre Bacri	Agnès Jaoui	
2017-18	La Nostalgie des blattes	Pierre Notte	Pierre Notte	Nominated - Molière Award for Best Actress
2019	Le Lien	François Bégaudeau	Panchika Velez	
2019	Trois femmes	Catherine Anne	Catherine Anne	
2020	Avant la retraite	Thomas Bernhard	Alain Françon	Nominated - Molière Award for Best Actress
2021-22	Les règles du savoir vivre dans la société moderne	Jean-Luc Lagarce	Marcial Di Fonzo Bo	
2022	Music-hall	Jean-Luc Lagarce	Marcial Di Fonzo Bo	Nominated - Molière Award for Best Actress
2023	Les Gratitudes	Delphine de Vigan	Fabien Gorgeart	

=== As director ===
Year	Title	Author	Notes
1975	Cinna	Molière	
1987	Les Femmes Savantes	Molière	
1992	Au salon des orchidées	Mona Thomas	
1994	Purgatoire	Philippe Minyana	
1996	La Demoiselle de la poste	Ewa Pokas	
1998	L'Âge d'or	Georges Feydeau	
1999	La Bataille de Vienne	Peter Turrini	
1999	George Dandin ou le Mari confondu	Molière	
2000	The Homecoming	Harold Pinter	
2009	The Miser	Molière	
2011	Je danse comme Jésus Christ sur le vaste océan	Alfred de Musset	
2011	Le Bourgeois gentilhomme	Molière	
2013-14	Dramuscules	Thomas Bernhard	
2016	Les Femmes Savantes	Molière	Prix du Brigadier for Best Direction
2018	The Game of Love and Chance	Pierre de Marivaux	

== Filmography ==
Year	Title	Role	Director	Notes
1966	L'homme qui a perdu son ombre	Fanny	Marcel Cravenne	TV movie
1967	Spéciale dernière	Peggy Grant	Alain Dhénaut	TV movie
1968	Le bourgeois gentilhomme	Nicole	Pierre Badel	TV movie
1970	Au théâtre ce soir	Catherine	Pierre Sabbagh	TV series (1 episode)
1971	It Only Happens to Others		Nadine Trintignant	
1974	La confession d'un enfant du siècle	Mme Daniel	Claude Santelli	TV movie
1980	Une page d'amour	Pauline	Élie Chouraqui	TV movie
1986	State of Grace	Sylvie	Jacques Rouffio	
1987	Les keufs	Dany	Josiane Balasko	
1987	Noyade interdite	Dr. Chauveau	Pierre Granier-Deferre	
1988	La petite amie	Odile	Luc Béraud	
1988	Life Is a Long Quiet River	Josette	Étienne Chatiliez	
1991	My Life Is Hell	Lilith	Josiane Balasko	
1992	Méchant garçon	Ronald's mother	Charles Gassot	
1993	Not Everybody's Lucky Enough to Have; Communist Parents	Régine	Jean-Jacques Zilbermann	
1994	Le mangeur de lune	Mathilde	Dai Sijie	
1994	La corruptrice	Marcelle	Bernard Stora	TV movie
1994	Ferbac	Mme Girard	Christian Faure	TV series (1 episode)
1995	French Twist	Dany	Josiane Balasko	
1996	La serva amorosa	Coraline	Jean Douchet	
1996	Mylène	Marianne	Claire Devers	TV movie
1996	Jeunesse sans Dieu		Catherine Corsini	TV movie
1996	Julie Lescaut	Jeanne Lesage	Josée Dayan	TV series (1 episode)
1997	Fred	Madame Mandor	Pierre Jolivet	
1997	L'autre côté de la mer	Maria	Dominique Cabrera	
1998	Man Is a Woman	Hannah Baumann	Jean-Jacques Zilbermann	
1999	Hygiène de l'assassin	Catherine	François Ruggieri	
2000	Les après-midi de Laura		Paolo Trotta	Short
2003	Les Côtelettes	Death	Bertrand Blier	
2005	It's Our Life!	Lucie Chevrier	Gérard Krawczyk	
2007	Michou d'Auber	The Orphanage's director	Thomas Gilou	
2008	Secret Defense	Pierre's mother	Philippe Haïm	
2008	A French Gigolo	Maggy	Josiane Balasko	
2009	La folle histoire d'amour de Simon Eskenazy	Arlette	Jean-Jacques Zilbermann	
2011	Un baiser papillon	Marie's mother	Karine Silla	
2012	Granny's Funeral	Suzanne	Bruno Podalydès	
2013	Violette	Berthe Leduc	Martin Provost	
2014	Le sang de la vigne	Janny Verniaud	Régis Musset	TV series (1 episode)
2015	Neuf jours en hiver	Mado	Alain Tasma	TV movie
2015	Malaterra	Rose Olivesi	Jean-Xavier de Lestrade & Laurent Herbiet	TV mini-series
2017	Jamais contente	Agathe	Émilie Deleuze	
2019	2 ou 3 choses de Marie Jacobson		Anne Azoulay	Short
2021	Le Grand Restaurant 3	Victor's mother	Romuald Boulanger & Pierre Palmade	TV movie
2022	Les engagés	Anne	Emilie Frèche	
2023	La grande magie	Charles's mother	Noémie Lvovsky	
2024	Capitaine Marleau	Alba de Bernac	Josée Dayan	TV series (1 episode)
