= Danièle Lebrun =

French actress

- Born: 24 July 1937 (age 89); Le Cheylard, France
- Occupation: Actress
- Years active: 1954-present

Danièle Lebrun (born 24 July 1937) is a French actress.

== Theater ==
Year	Title	Author	Director	Notes
1954	The Crucible	Arthur Miller	Raymond Rouleau	
1956	Cécile ou l'École des pères	Jean Anouilh	Roland Piétri	
1958	Un homme comme les autres	Armand Salacrou	Jacques Dumesnil	
1960	La Petite Datcha	Vasiliei Vasil'evitch Chkvarkin	René Dupuy	
1962	No Exit	Jean-Paul Sartre	Tania Balachova	
1963	You Never Can Tell	George Bernard Shaw	René Dupuy (2)	
1965	Amerika	Franz Kafka	Antoine Bourseiller	
1965	No Exit	Jean-Paul Sartre	Michel Vitold	
1965	George Dandin ou le Mari confondu	Molière	Stephan Meldegg	
1966	George Dandin ou le Mari confondu	Molière	Roger Planchon	
1967	Tango	Sławomir Mrożek	Laurent Terzieff	
1967	The Moods of Marianne	Alfred de Musset	Georges Vitaly	
1967	Pour avoir Adrienne	Louis Verneuil	Pierre Mondy	
1968	The Misanthrope	Molière	Marcel Bluwal	
1968	Much Ado About Nothing	William Shakespeare	Jorge Lavelli	
1968	After the Rain	John Griffith Bowen	René Dupuy (3)	
1970	King Lear	William Shakespeare	Pierre Debauche	
1970	Ne réveillez pas Madame	Jean Anouilh	Jean Anouilh & Roland Piétri (2)	
1971	La Mort de Lady Chatterley	Christopher Frank	Jacques Seiler	
1972	Tu étais si gentil quand tu étais petit	Jean Anouilh	Jean Anouilh (2) & Roland Piétri (3)	
1973	La Débauche	Marcel Achard	Jean Le Poulain	
1973	Ne réveillez pas Madame	Jean Anouilh	Jean Anouilh (3) & Roland Piétri (4)	
1974-75	Colombe	Jean Anouilh	Jean Anouilh (4) & Roland Piétri (5)	
1975	Androcles and the Lion	George Bernard Shaw	Guy Rétoré	
1976	Madame de Sade	Yukio Mishima	Jean-Pierre Granval	Prix du Syndicat de la critique - Best Actress
1977	Le Nouveau Monde	Auguste Villiers de l'Isle-Adam	Jean-Louis Barrault	
1979	S.T.	Federico García Lorca	Antoine Bourseiller (2)	
1980	Un dimanche indécis dans la vie d'Anna	Jacques Lassalle	Jacques Lassalle	
1980-82	Exercises in Style	Raymond Queneau	Jacques Seiler (2)	
1984	La Bagarre	Roger Vitrac	Jacques Seiler (3)	
1985	Olympe dort et La Donna	Constance Delaunay	Claude Santelli	
1985	Pasodoble	Jacques Le Marquet	Jacques Seiler (4)	
1986	Clérambard	Marcel Aymé	Jacques Rosny	
1987	La Ronde	Arthur Schnitzler	Alfredo Arias	
1987	Génousie	René de Obaldia	Claude Santelli (2)	
1989	My Mother Said I Never Should	Charlotte Keatley	Michel Fagadau	Nominated - Molière Award for Best Actress
1989-90	Monsieur Songe	Robert Pinget	Jacques Seiler (5)	
1990	Exercises in Style	Raymond Queneau	Jacques Seiler (6)	
1991	La Nuit de Valognes	Éric-Emmanuel Schmitt	Jean-Luc Tardieu	
1991	La Sortie d'un théâtre	Nicolas Gogol	Danièle Lebrun	
1992	The Misanthrope	Molière	Francis Huster	Molière Award for Best Supporting Actress
1993	Roman Fever	Edith Wharton	Simone Benmussa	
1994	Entrée de secours	Gérald Aubert	Michel Fagadau (2)	
1994	La Fille à la trompette	Jacques Rampal	Gérard Caillaud	Nominated - Molière Award for Best Actress
1995	Roman Fever	Edith Wharton	Simone Benmussa (2)	
1995	The Importance of Being Earnest	Oscar Wilde	Jérôme Savary	
1996	Célimène et le Cardinal	Jacques Rampal	Jacques Rampal	Nominated - Molière Award for Best Actress
1997	Dear Liar	Jerome Kilty	Danièle Lebrun (2)	
1997	Haute Garonne	Alain Gautré	Danièle Lebrun (3)	
1998	The Seagull	Anton Tchekhov	Christophe Lidon	
2000	Point de lendemain	Vivant Denon	Christophe Lidon (2)	
2000-01	Les Fausses Confidences	Pierre de Marivaux	Gildas Bourdet	
2002	Jeux de scène	Victor Haïm	Marcel Bluwal (2)	Nominated - Molière Award for Best Actress
2004	À la folie, pas du tout	Edward Albee	François-Louis Tilly	
2006	Pygmalion	George Bernard Shaw	Nicolas Briançon	Molière Award for Best Supporting Actress
2007-08	It's Only the End of the World	Jean-Luc Lagarce	François Berreur	
2008-09	L'Antichambre	Jean-Claude Brisville	Christophe Lidon (3)	
2009	Délire à deux	Eugène Ionesco	Christophe Lidon (4)	
2010	Vous partez déjà ?	Antonia Fraser	Brice Cauvin	
2010	Kiki van Beethoven	Éric-Emmanuel Schmitt	Christophe Lidon (5)	
2011	No Trifling with Love	Alfred de Musset	Yves Beaunesne	
2012	La Trilogie de la Villégiature	Carlo Goldoni	Alain Françon	
2012	The Italian Straw Hat	Eugène Marin Labiche	Giorgio Barberio Corsetti	
2014	The Visit	Friedrich Dürrenmatt	Christophe Lidon (6)	
2014	Cabaret Barbara	Barbara	Béatrice Agenin	
2015	Innocence	Dea Loher	Denis Marleau	
2015	Romeo and Juliet	William Shakespeare	Eric Ruf	

== Filmography ==
Year	Title	Role	Director(s)	Notes
1960	Les Tortillards	Suzy Beauminet	Jean Bastia	
1960	Le mouton	Gisèle Martin	Pierre Chevalier	
1962	The Seven Deadly Sins		Édouard Molinaro	
1964	Cousine Bette	Hortense Hulot	Yves-André Hubert	TV movie
1966	La fausse suivante ou Le fourbe puni	The Countess	Jean-Paul Sassy	TV movie
1966	Le théâtre de la jeunesse	Mina	Marcel Cravenne	TV series (1 episode)
1966	L'âge heureux	The teacher	Philippe Agostini	TV series (1 episode)
1967	The Game of Love and Chance	Silvia	Marcel Bluwal	TV movie
1967	Bajazet	Atalide	Michel Mitrani	TV movie
1967	Au théâtre ce soir	Adrienne Thomeret	Pierre Sabbagh	TV series (1 episodes)
1968	Sarn	Jancis	Claude Santelli	TV movie
1968	La double inconstance	Sylvia	Marcel Bluwal (2)	TV movie
1969	Les frères Karamazov	Grouchenka	Marcel Bluwal (3)	TV movie
1970	L'illusion comique	Lyse	Robert Maurice	TV movie
1971	It Only Happens to Others	Sophie	Nadine Trintignant	
1971	Le malade imaginaire	Béline	Claude Santelli (2)	TV movie
1971-73	The New Adventures of Vidocq	Baronne de Saint-Gely	Marcel Bluwal (4)	TV series (13 episodes)
1972	Une femme qu'a le coeur trop petit	Balbine	Alain Dhénaut	TV movie
1973	Au théâtre ce soir	Laurette	Georges Folgoas	TV series (1 episodes)
1974	La dernière carte	Léopoldine	Marcel Cravenne (2)	TV movie
1974	Chéri-Bibi	Cécily	Jean Pignol	TV series (1 episodes)
1975	Bérénice	Bérénice	Raymond Rouleau	TV movie
1975	Sara	Sara	Marcel Bluwal (5)	TV movie
1976	Les infidèles	Diane	Alain Dhénaut (2)	TV movie
1978	Mitzi	Mitzi	Marcel Bluwal (6)	TV movie
1978	Lulu	Lulu	Marcel Bluwal (7)	TV movie
1979	Joséphine ou la comédie des ambitions	Joséphine de Beauharnais	Robert Mazoyer	TV mini-series
1981	Asphalte	Florence Rouvier	Denis Amar	
1981	Les dossiers de l'écran	Duchess of Aiguillon	Alain Boudet	TV series (1 episode)
1983	La soupière	Germaine Lapuy	Paul Planchon	TV movie
1984	Irène et Fred	Irène Joliot-Curie	Roger Kahane	TV movie
1986	Music Hall	Freval	Marcel Bluwal (8)	TV movie
1987	La face cachée de la lune		Yvon Marciano	Short
1987	Série noire	Madame Faradace	Marcel Bluwal (9)	TV series (1 episode)
1988	Camille Claudel	Rose Beuret	Bruno Nuytten	
1988	Les enquêtes du commissaire Maigret	Mathilde	Philippe Laïk	TV series (1 episode)
1989	Mon dernier rêve sera pour vous	Céleste de Chateaubriand	Robert Mazoyer (2)	TV mini-series
1990	Uranus	Madame Archambaud	Claude Berri	Nominated - César Award for Best Supporting Actress
1990	Stirn et Stern	Jeanne Stirn	Peter Kassovitz	TV movie
1990	L'ami Giono : Onorato	Hélène de Sceez	Marcel Bluwal (10)	TV movie
1990	Clérambard	Countess Louise de Clérambard	Marcel Bluwal (11)	TV movie
1990	S.O.S. disparus	Sophie Leroux	Maurice Frydland	TV mini-series
1990	Haute tension	Hélène	Joyce Buñuel	TV series (1 episode)
1992	588 rue paradis	Alexandre's mother	Henri Verneuil	
1992	A Tale of Winter	Paulina	Éric Rohmer	
1992	Céline	Madame Giraud	Jean-Claude Brisseau	
1993	Drôles d'oiseaux	Old Marthe	Peter Kassovitz (2)	
1993	L'argent fait le bonheur	The Prostitute	Robert Guédiguian	
1993	Lucas	Sophia	Nadine Trintignant (2)	TV movie
1993	Une femme sans histoire	Marie Bonnet	Alain Tasma	TV movie
1993	Le boeuf clandestin	Madame Berthaud	Lazare Iglesis	TV movie
1993	Mayrig	Alexandre's mother	Henri Verneuil (2)	TV mini-series
1993	Les maîtres du pain	The Baroness	Hervé Baslé	TV mini-series
1993	Les Cinq Dernières Minutes	Aude	Jean-Jacques Kahn	TV series (1 episode)
1994	Je t'aime quand même	Betty	Nina Companeez	
1994	Les absences du président	Madame Deschanel	Gérard Guillaume	TV movie
1994	Maigret	Madame Gouin	Joyce Buñuel (2)	TV series (1 episode)
1995	Santa & the Magician	Voice	Henri Heidsieck	Short
1995	Lise ou L'affabulatrice	Marion	Marcel Bluwal (12)	TV movie
1996	A Self Made Hero	Madame Dehousse	Jacques Audiard	
1996	Alla turca	The Secretary	Macha Méril	TV movie
1996	Les enfants du mensonge	Martine	Frédéric Krivine	TV movie
1997	Assassin(s)	Max's Mother	Mathieu Kassovitz	
1998	Les moissons de l'océan	Madame Reine Levasseur	François Luciani	TV movie
1999	Belle maman	Josette	Gabriel Aghion	
1999	Le plus beau pays du monde	Ginette Maurey	Marcel Bluwal (13)	
1999	La débandade	Myriam	Claude Berri (2)	
2000	L'extraterrestre	Edith	Didier Bourdon	
2000	En face	Woman in red	Mathias Ledoux	
2000	Les ritaliens	Gisèle Moreau	Philomène Esposito	TV movie
2000	Le coup du lapin	Irène	Didier Grousset	TV movie
2000	Chercheur d'héritiers	Françoise Garmont	Olivier Langlois	TV series (1 episode)
2001	Des nouvelles des enfants	Jeanne	Daniel Janneau	TV movie
2002	Madame Sans-Gêne	Letizia Ramolino	Philippe de Broca	TV movie
2002	La liberté de Marie	Catherine Berteau	Caroline Huppert	TV mini-series
2003	Le premier fils	Madeleine	Philomène Esposito (2)	TV movie
2003	Changer tout	Philomène Cortal	Élisabeth Rappeneau	TV movie
2003	Nés de la mère du monde	Nina Sidowski	Denise Chalem	TV movie
2003	Toute une histoire	The Mother	Jean Rousselot	Short
2004	Vous êtes de la région ?	Hélène	Lionel Epp	TV movie
2004	Le voyageur sans bagage	The Duchess	Pierre Boutron	TV movie
2005	Désiré Landru	Madame Cuchet	Pierre Boutron (2)	TV movie
2005	Les Cordier, juge et flic	Louise Bontemps	Jean-Marc Seban	TV series (1 episode)
2005	La crim'	Caroline Lagrange	François Luciani (2)	TV series (1 episode)
2006	Les soeurs Robin	Aminthe Robin	Jacques Renard	TV movie
2006	Je hais les parents	Monique	Didier Bivel	TV movie
2006	Le Grand Charles	Yvonne de Gaulle	Bernard Stora	TV mini-series
2006	Fête de famille	Colette Mercier	Lorenzo Gabriele	TV series (6 episodes)
2007	Hunting and Gathering	Camille's Mother	Claude Berri (3)	
2007	72/50		Armel de Lorme & Gauthier Fages de Bouteiller	
2007	Polichinelle	The Mother	David Braun	Short
2007	Le voyageur de la Toussaint	Géraldine Eloi	Philippe Laïk (2)	TV movie
2007	Les interminables	Gladyss	Thomas Pieds	TV movie
2007	La légende des 3 clefs	Mathilde Sancier	Patrick Dewolf	TV mini-series
2008	Disco	Mother Navarre	Fabien Onteniente	
2009	Une semaine sur deux (et la moitié des vacances scolaires)	Nicole	Ivan Calbérac	
2010	Imogène McCarthery	Mrs Elroy	Alexandre Charlot & Franck Magnier	
2010	L'accordeur	The Woman	Olivier Treiner	Short
2012	Another Woman's Life	Denise Bontant	Sylvie Testud	
2013	Les vieux calibres	Emilienne	Marcel Bluwal (14) & Serge De Closets	TV movie
2014	La clinique du docteur Blanche	Sophie Blanche	Sarah Lévy	TV movie
2014	Monsieur Max et la rumeur	Clémence	Jacques Malaterre	TV movie
2015	Les trois soeurs	Anfissa	Valeria Bruni Tedeschi	TV movie
2017	Marie-Francine	The supermarket woman	Valérie Lemercier	
2023	Noël Joyeux	Monique	Clément Michel	
2026	Comédie-Française	Nadine Guimard	Martin Darondeau, Bertrand Usclat	
