= Dominique Valadié =

French actress (born 1952)

- Born: Nice, France
- Occupations: Actress, Comedian
- Years active: 1976 - present

Dominique Valadié (born 1952) is a French actress. She studied acting at the Conservatoire national supérieur d'art dramatique in Paris. Valadié has been a lecturer at the Conservatoire national supérieur d'art dramatique since 1983.

== Theater ==
Year	Title	Author	Director	Notes
1977	Iphigénie hôtel	Michel Vinaver	Antoine Vitez	
1978-79	The School for Wives	Molière	Antoine Vitez (2)	
1978-79	Tartuffe	Molière	Antoine Vitez (3)	
1978-79	Dom Juan	Molière	Antoine Vitez (4)	
1978-79	The Misanthrope	Molière	Antoine Vitez (5)	
1980	Berenice	Jean Racine	Antoine Vitez (6)	
1980	The Marriage of Figaro	Pierre Beaumarchais	Françoise Petit & Maurice Vaudaux	
1982	La Mort en ce théâtre	Pierre-Mourad Mansouri	Christian Benedetti	
1983	La Peau dure	Raymond Guérin	Christian Colin	
1984	The Seagull	Anton Tchekhov	Antoine Vitez (7)	
1984	Le Héron	Vassili Axionov	Antoine Vitez (8)	
1984	Noises	Enzo Cormann	Alain Françon	Prix du Syndicat de la critique - Best Comedian
1984	Ici ou ailleurs	Robert Pinget		
1985	Mes souvenirs	Herculine Barbin	Alain Françon (2)	
1985	Ubu Roi	Alfred Jarry	Antoine Vitez (9)	Prix Gérard Philipe - Best Comedian
1985	Fresque provençale	Alphonse Daudet		
1986	The Liar	Pierre Corneille	Alain Françon (3)	
1986	Le Bourgeois gentilhomme	Molière	Jean-Luc Boutté	
1987	Hedda Gabler	Henrik Ibsen	Alain Françon (4)	Nominated - Molière Award for Best Actress
1987	The Satin Slipper	Paul Claudel	Antoine Vitez (10)	
1987	Le Silence de Molière	Macchia Giovanni	Jacques Nichet	
1988	The Stranger	Leslie Kaplan	Claude Régy	
1988	Palais-Mascotte	Enzo Cormann	Alain Françon (5)	
1990	La Dame de chez Maxim	Georges Feydeau	Alain Françon (6)	Molière Award for Best Actress
1992	Le Silence de Molière	Macchia Giovanni	Jacques Nichet (2)	
1993	La Remise	Roger Planchon	Alain Françon (7)	
1994	Les Estivants	Maxime Gorki	Lluis Pasqual	
1994	Single Spies	Alan Bennett	Bruno Bayen	Nominated - Molière Award for Best Actress
1995-96	The Seagull	Anton Tchekhov	Alain Françon (8)	
1996-97	Edward II	Christopher Marlowe	Alain Françon (9)	
1997	À trois mains	Bruno Bayen	Bruno Bayen (2)	
1998	Tartuffe	Molière	Jean-Pierre Vincent	
1998	Die Präsidentinnen	Werner Schwab	Marcela Salivarova-Bideau	
1999	Übergewicht, unwichtig: Unform. Ein europäisches Abendmahl	Werner Schwab	Philippe Adrien	
1999	Les Huissiers	Michel Vinaver	Alain Françon (10)	
1999	Mais aussi autre chose	Christine Angot	Alain Françon (11)	
2000	Coffee	Edward Bond	Alain Françon (12)	
2001-02	Princess Maleine	Maurice Maeterlinck	Yves Beaunesne	
2002	Skinner	Michel Deutsch	Alain Françon (13)	
2003-04	Little Eyolf	Henrik Ibsen	Alain Françon (14)	
2003-04	Si ce n’est toi	Edward Bond	Alain Françon (15)	
2004	Ivanov	Anton Chekhov	Alain Françon (16)	
2004	Quartett	Heiner Müller	Hans Peter Cloos	
2005	Le Retour de Sade	Bernard Noël	Charles Tordjman	
2005	Platonov	Anton Chekhov	Alain Françon (17)	
2006	Born	Edward Bond	Alain Françon (18)	
2006	Chair	Edward Bond	Alain Françon (19)	
2006	Si ce n’est toi	Edward Bond	Alain Françon (20)	
2007	The President	Thomas Bernhard	Blandine Savetier	Prix du Syndicat de la critique - Best Comedian
2007-08	L'Ignorant et le fou	Thomas Bernhard	Emmanuel Daumas	
2008	Chair	Edward Bond	Alain Françon (21)	
2008	Divine Comedy	Dante Alighieri	Valérie Dréville	
2009	The Cherry Orchard	Anton Tchekhov	Alain Françon (22)	
2009	Laissez-moi seule	Bruno Bayen	Bruno Bayen (3)	
2009	Twelfth Night	William Shakespeare	Jean-Louis Benoît	Nominated - Molière Award for Best Supporting Actress
2010-11	Du mariage au divorce	Georges Feydeau	Alain Françon (23)	
2011-12	Chroniques d'une haine ordinaire	Pierre Desproges	Michel Didym	
2013	The Master Builder	Henrik Ibsen	Alain Françon (24)	
2013	People	Edward Bond	Alain Françon (25)	
2015	Toujours la tempête	Peter Handke	Alain Françon (26)	

== Filmography ==
Year	Title	Role	Director	Notes
1976	Les mystères de Loudun	Jeanne	Gérard Vergez	TV movie
1978	Lulu		Marcel Bluwal	TV movie
1980	Le misanthrope	Eliante	Marcel Bluwal (2)	TV movie
1981	Le mariage de Figaro	Suzanne	Pierre Badel	TV movie
1981	Caméra une première	Nicole / Françoise	Antoine Gallien & Jean-Pierre Bastid	TV series (2 episodes)
1982	Légitime violence	The secretary	Serge Leroy	
1982	La minute nécessaire de Monsieur Cyclopède		Jean-Louis Fournier	TV series (6 episodes)
1985	L'épi d'or	The neighbor	Fabrice Cazeneuve	TV movie
1986	L'inconnue de Vienne	Madame Lebeau	Bernard Stora	TV movie
1986	Le croc-note show	Female	Gilles Gay	TV series
1989	Embrasse-moi	Nora	Michèle Rosier	
1989	Comme d'habitude		Bruno Herbulot	Short
1991	Une rencontre		Charles Castella	Short
1992	Juste avant l'orage	Joséphine	Bruno Herbulot (2)	
1992	Les Cordier, juge et flic	Anne-Marie	Alain Bonnot	TV series (1 episode)
1992	Trop près des Dieux		Jean-Michel Roux	Short
1995	A Single Girl	Valérie's mother	Benoît Jacquot	
1995	Pullman paradis	Maryse Ploche	Michèle Rosier (2)	
1996	My Man	Gilberte	Bertrand Blier	
1996	Le R.I.F.	Sterna	Michel Andrieu	TV series (1 episode)
1996	Le contre-ciel		Siegrid Alnoy	
1997	La soupe		Antoine Santana	Short
2002	A Moment of Happiness	Cécile	Antoine Santana (2)	
2002	Le loup de la côte Ouest	Guardian	Hugo Santiago	
2003	Jean Moulin, une affaire française	Laure Moulin	Pierre Aknine	TV movie
2003	Elle est des nôtres	Marie-Noëlle	Siegrid Alnoy (2)	
2006	Le Cri	Roseline	Hervé Baslé	TV mini-series
2006	Au crépuscule des temps	Madame Fracasso	Sarah Lévy	TV movie
2008	Didine	Madame Santonge	Vincent Dietschy	
2009	Un chat un chat	Célimène's mother	Sophie Fillières	
2011	À la recherche du temps perdu	Marcel's mother	Nina Companeez	TV mini-series
2013	Under the Rainbow	Jacqueline	Agnès Jaoui	
2014	La couille	Sylvie	Emmanuel Poulain-Arnaud	Short
2015	Le port de l'oubli	Christine Deluc	Bruno Gantillon	TV movie
2018	Our Struggles	Joëlle	Guillaume Senez	
