= Colombe (play) =

- Original language: French
- Written by: Jean Anouilh
- Genre: Theatre

Premiere
- Date: February 10, 1951
- Place: France

Colombe is a play in four acts by French dramatist Jean Anouilh, written in 1950, created at the Théâtre de l'Atelier on February 10, 1951, in a mise-en-scène, set and costumes by André Barsacq and published in 1951 at Éditions de la Table ronde in Pièces brillantes.

== Plot summary ==
A large self-centred actress lacking maternal fibre must face the return of her son Julien, who is intransigent and jealous of his brother Armand who his mother always babied. He refused any special favours in order to escape his three years of military service that awaited him, so he leaves his young, naïve and submissive wife Colombe. The mother decides to hire Colombe at the theatre. The woman would jump with joy, happy at becoming her own woman, and would break up with Julien.

== Théâtre de l'Atelier, 1951 ==
- Mise-en-scène: André Barsacq
- Set: André Barsacq
- Costumes: André Barsacq
- Characters and actors:
  - Colombe: Danièle Delorme
  - Julien: Yves Robert
  - Madame Georges: Gabrielle Fontan
  - Madame Alexandra: Marie Ventura
  - Le pédicure: Jacques Rispal
  - La Surette (the sour one): Jacques Dufilho
  - Armand: José Quaglio
  - Desfournettes: Marcel Pérès
  - Poète-Chéri: Maurice Jacquemont
  - Le coiffeur (the hairdresser): Henri Djanik
  - Du Bartas: Paul Oettly
  - First Machinist: Georges Norel
  - Second Machinist: Charles Nugue

== Théâtre de l'Atelier, 1954 ==
- Mise en scène: André Barsacq
- Set: André Barsacq
- Costumes: André Barsacq
- Characters and actors:
  - Colombe: Danièle Delorme
  - Julien: Yves Robert
  - Madame Georges: Madeleine Geoffroy
  - Madame Alexandra: Marie Ventura
  - Le pédicure: Roger Marino
  - La Surette: Jacques Dufilho
  - Armand: José Quaglio
  - Desfournettes: Jean Brunel
  - Poète-Chéri: Maurice Nasil
  - Le coiffeur: Jacques Ciron
  - Du Bartas: Paul Oettly

== Comédie des Champs-Élysées, 1974 ==
- Mise en scène: Jean Anouilh and Roland Piétri
- Set: Jean-Denis Malclès
- Costumes: Jean-Denis Malclès
- Characters and actors:
  - Colombe: Danièle Lebrun
  - Julien: Daniel Colas
  - Madame Georges: Annette Poivre
  - Madame Alexandra: Luce Garcia-Ville
  - Le pédicure: Roger Lauran
  - La Surette: Angelo Bardi
  - Armand: Michel Boy
  - Desfournettes: Roland Piétri
  - Poète-Chéri: Robert Murzeau
  - Le coiffeur: Jean-Pierre Dravel
  - Du Bartas: Pierre Bertin

== Comédie des Champs-Élysées, 1996 ==
After January 19, 1996, at the Comédie des Champs-Élysées.

- Mise en scène: Michel Fagadau
- Set: Ghislain Ury
- Costumes: Ghislain Ury
- Lighting: Laurent Béal
- Characters and actors:
  - Colombe: Laure Marsac
  - Julien: Yannick Soulier
  - Geneviève Page
  - Jean-Paul Roussillon
  - Gabriel Cattand
  - Isabelle Moulin
  - Josiane Lévêque
  - José Paul

== Comédie des Champs-Élysées, 2010 ==
- Mise en scène: Michel Fagadau
- Set: Mathieu Dupuy
- Costumes: Pascale Bordet
- Characters and actors:
  - Colombe: Sara Giraudeau
  - Julien: Gregori Baquet
  - Madame Alexandra: Anny Duperey
  - La Surette: Rufus
  - Du Bartas: Jean-Pierre Moulin
  - Madame Georges: Fabienne Chaudat
  - Emile Robinet or Poète-Chéri: Jean-Paul Bordes
  - Le coiffeur: Jean-François Pargoud
  - Armand: Benjamin Bellecour
  - Desfournettes: Etienne Draber
  - Machinists: Bastien Cousseau, Frederic Duval, Yvon-Olivier Garcia

At the 2010 Molière Award, Anny Duperey was nominated for Best Actress, Fabienne Chaudat for Best Supporting Actor and Pascale Bordet for Best Costumes.

The presentation of May 15, 2010 was broadcast live on France 2.
