= Snakes and Ladders (disambiguation) =

Snakes and Ladders is a popular children's board game.

Snakes and Ladders may also refer to:

== In film and television ==
- Snakes and Ladders (1965 film), a 1965 French film
- Snakes and Ladders (1980 film), a Franco-Chilean short film
- Snakes and Ladders (1996 film), a 1996 Irish film
- Snakes and Ladders (Canadian TV series), a 2004 TV series starring Amy Price-Francis
- Snakes and Ladders (Indian TV series), a 2024 Indian Tamil-language television series
- Snakes and Ladders (game show), an Australian 1959 game show
- "Snakes and Ladders", two episodes from the British medical drama television show Holby City, in series 3 and series 18
- "Snakes and Ladders", an episode from the British drama series The Bill

== In literature and publications ==
- Snakes and Ladders, a 1978 autobiographical book by Dirk Bogarde
- Snakes and Ladders, a 1994 book by Roald Dahl
- Snakes & Ladders, a 2001 comic book by Alan Moore and Eddie Campbell

== In music ==
- Snakes & Ladders Records

=== An album ===
- Snakes and Ladders (Gerry Rafferty album), 1980
- Snakes and Ladders / The Best of Faces, a 1976 Faces release
- Snakes and Ladders (Frank Tovey album), 1986
- Snakes 'n' Ladders, a 1989 Nazareth album
- Snakes & Ladders (Wiley album)
- Snakes & Ladders (The Tin Lids album)
- Snakes & Ladders, a 2026 Armand Hammer album
- Snakes and Ladders, a one-time performance and resulting CD by Alan Moore

=== A song ===
- "Snakes and Ladders", a 2006 musical composition by Fred Frith
- "Snakes and Ladders", a Gryphon song from the 1977 album Treason
- "Snakes and Ladders", a Men at Work song from the 1985 album Two Hearts
- "Snakes and Ladders", a song from Joni Mitchell's 1988 album Chalk Mark in a Rain Storm
- "Snakes and Ladders", alternate title for the 2003 Radiohead song "Sit Down. Stand Up."
- "Snakes and Ladders", a song from Joss Stone's 2004 studio album Mind Body & Soul
- "Snakes and Ladders", a song on the 2007 Switches album Heart Tuned to D.E.A.D.
