= Secret Defense =

Secret Defense may refer to:

- Secret Defense (1998 film)
- Secret Defense (2008 film)
