= Molière Award for Best Actress =

French theatre award for actresses

Les Molières for Best Actress
- Awarded for: Best Performance by an Actress in a Leading Role
- Country: France
- Presented by: Molière Award
- First award: Suzanne Flon for Léopold le bien-aimé (1987)
- Currently held by: Christine Murillo for La Mouche (2020); Béatrice Agenin for Marie des poules - gouvernante chez George Sand (2020)
- Website: https://www.lesmolieres.com/

Molière Award for Best Actress.

== Winners and nominees ==
=== 1980s ===
- 1987 : Suzanne Flon in Léopold le bien aimé
  - Nicole Garcia in Two for the Seesaw (Deux sur la balançoire)
  - Denise Grey in Harold and Maude (Harold et Maude)
  - Jeanne Moreau in Zerline's Tale (Le Récit de la servante Zerline)
  - Dominique Valadié in Hedda Gabler
- 1988 : Jeanne Moreau in Zerline's Tale (Le récit de la servante Zerline)
  - María Casares in Hecuba (Hécube)
  - Anny Duperey in The Secret (Le Secret)
  - Macha Méril in L'Éloignement
  - Delphine Seyrig in Woman in Mind (Un jardin en désordre)
- 1989 : María Casares in Hecuba (Hécube)
  - Suzanne Flon in Une absence
  - Denise Gence in The Chairs (Les Chaises)
  - Catherine Hiegel in La Veillée
  - Isabelle Huppert in A Month in the Country (Un mois à la campagne)

=== 1990s ===
- 1990 : Denise Gence in Avant la retraite
  - Jane Birkin in Quelque part dans cette vie
  - Anny Duperey in Le Pain de ménage et Le Plaisir de rompre
  - Danièle Lebrun in Faut pas tuer maman !
  - Sonia Vollereaux in Les Palmes de Monsieur Schutz
- 1991 : Dominique Valadié in The Girl from Maxim's (La Dame de chez Maxim)
  - Marie-Anne Chazel in The Girl from Maxim's (La Dame de chez Maxim)
  - Tsilla Chelton in Driving Miss Daisy (En conduisant Miss Daisy)
  - Nicole Garcia in The Break of Noon (Partage de midi)
  - Annie Girardot in Heldenplatz
  - Sophie Marceau in Eurydice
- 1992 : Ludmila Mikaël in Célimène et le Cardinal
  - Béatrice Agenin in C'était bien
  - Suzanne Flon in L'Antichambre
  - Anouk Grinberg in Time and the Room (Le Temps et la chambre)
  - Zabou in Cuisine et dépendances
- 1993 : Edwige Feuillère in Edwige Feuillère en scène
  - Fanny Ardant in The Little Black Book (L'Aide mémoire)
  - Emmanuelle Béart in On ne badine pas avec l'amour
  - Denise Gence in Happy Days (Oh les beaux jours)
  - Catherine Hiegel in La Serva amorosa
  - Sophie Marceau in Pygmalion
- 1994 : Tsilla Chelton in The Chairs (Les Chaises)
  - Isabelle Huppert in Orlando
  - Danièle Lebrun in La fille à la trompette
  - Coline Serreau in Quisaitout et Grobêta
  - Caroline Silhol in Je m'appelais Marie-Antoinette
- 1995 : Suzanne Flon in La Chambre d’amis
  - Juliette Brac in Charcuterie fine
  - Geneviève Casile in L'Allée du roi
  - Isabelle Huppert in Orlando
  - Dominique Valadié in Espions et célibataires
- 1996 : Christiane Cohendy in Decadence
  - Anny Duperey in An Ideal Husband (Un mari idéal)
  - Nicole Garcia in Scènes de la vie conjugale
  - Ludmila Mikael in Gertrud
  - Geneviève Page in Mademoiselle Colombe (Colombe)
- 1997 : Myriam Boyer in Who's Afraid of Virginia Woolf? (Qui a peur de Virginia Woolf ?)
  - Fanny Ardant in Master Class
  - Tsilla Chelton in Le Mal de mère
  - Sandrine Kiberlain in Le Roman de Lulu
  - Danièle Lebrun in Célimène et le Cardinal
- 1998 : Dominique Blanc in A Doll's House (Une maison de poupée)
  - Béatrice Agenin in Who's Afraid of Virginia Woolf? (Qui a peur de Virginia Woolf ?)
  - Geneviève Fontanel in Adam et Eve
  - Ludmila Mikael in Two for the Seesaw (Deux sur la balançoire)
  - Zabou in Skylight
- 1999 : Isabelle Carré in Mademoiselle Else
  - Annick Blancheteau in Pour la galerie
  - Caroline Cellier in A Streetcar Named Desire (Un tramway nommé désir)
  - Marilu Marini in Le Frigo and La Femme assise
  - Cristiana Reali in Duet for One (Duo pour violon seul)

=== 2000s ===
- 2000 : Judith Magre inc Shirley
  - Marianne Basler in Betrayal (Trahisons)
  - Suzanne Flon in L'Amante anglaise
  - Catherine Frot in Dîner entre amis
  - Marie Laforêt in Master Class
- 2001 : Corinne Jaber in A Beast on the Moon (Une bête sur la lune)
  - Isabelle Adjani in The Lady of the Camellias (La Dame aux camélias)
  - Isabelle Huppert in Medea (Médée)
  - Ludmila Mikael in Un trait de l'esprit
  - Catherine Rich in The Unexpected Man (L'Homme du hasard)
- 2002 : Annie Girardot in Madame Marguerite
  - Clémentine Célarié in Madame Sans-Gêne
  - Florence Pernel in The Shop Around the Corner (La boutique au coin de la rue)
  - Muriel Robin in La Griffe (A71)
  - Caroline Silhol in Elvire
- 2003 : Danielle Darrieux in Oscar and the Lady in Pink (Oscar et la dame rose)
  - Francine Bergé in Jeux de scène
  - Dominique Blanc in Phèdre
  - Anouk Grinberg in Proof (La Preuve)
  - Danièle Lebrun in Jeux de scène
- 2004 : Isabelle Carré in L'Hiver sous la table
  - Micheline Dax in Driving Miss Daisy (Miss Daisy et son chauffeur)
  - Isabelle Gelinas in Things We Do for Love (L'Amour est enfant de salaud)
  - Chantal Neuwirth in Portrait de famille
  - Catherine Rich in Senator Fox (Le Sénateur Fox)
- 2005 : Christine Murillo in Dis à ma fille que je pars en voyage
  - Myriam Boyer in Je viens d'un pays de neige
  - Marianne Epin in Hannah K.
  - Isabelle Huppert in Hedda Gabler
  - Cristiana Reali in The Mistress of the Inn (La Locandiera)
  - Caroline Silhol in Molly
- 2006 : Judith Magre in Histoires d'hommes
  - Emmanuelle Devos in Créanciers
  - Anny Duperey in Oscar and the Lady in Pink (Oscar et la dame rose)
  - Catherine Hiegel in Embrasser les ombres
  - Catherine Samie in Happy Days (Oh les beaux jours)
  - Barbara Schulz in Pygmalion
- 2007 : Martine Chevallier in Return to the Desert (Le Retour au désert)
  - Isabelle Adjani in Marie Stuart
  - Geneviève Casile in Lady Windermere's Fan (L'Éventail de Lady Windermere)
  - Catherine Frot in Si tu mourais...
  - Isabelle Gelinas in Le Jardin
- 2008 : Myriam Boyer in The Life Before Us (La Vie devant soi)
  - Marina Hands in The Break of Noon (Partage de midi)
  - Cristiana Reali in Good Canary
  - Dominique Reymond in Le Pélican
- 2009 : Anne Alvaro in Gertrude (The Cry) (Gertrude (le cri))
  - Zabou Breitman in Des gens
  - Marie Laforêt in Master Class
  - Christine Murillo in Vers toi terre promise
  - Dominique Reymond in The Night of the Iguana (La Nuit de l'iguane)
  - Mélanie Thierry in Baby Doll

=== 2010s ===
- 2010 : Dominique Blanc in La Douleur
  - Anny Duperey in Mademoiselle Colombe (Colombe)
  - Isabelle Gélinas in L'Illusion conjugale
  - Anouk Grinberg in Les Fausses Confidences
  - Norah Krief in The Girl from Maxim's (La Dame de chez Maxim)
  - Hélène Vincent in Alexandra David-Néel, mon Tibet
- 2011 : Catherine Hiegel in La Mère
  - Valeria Bruni Tedeschi in Autumn Dream (Rêve d'automne)
  - Julie Depardieu in Nono
  - Maaïke Jansen in Le Technicien
  - Dominique Reymond in The Chairs (Les Chaises)
  - Hélène Vincent in La Celestina (La Célestine)

Molière for an actress in a public theatre show

- 2014 : Valérie Dréville in Ghosts (Les Revenants)
  - Cécile Garcia-Fogel in Les Serments indiscrets
  - Anouk Grinberg in Molly Bloom
  - Isabelle Huppert in Les Fausses Confidences

Molière for an actress in a private theatre show

- 2014 : Isabelle Gélinas in Le Père
  - Emmanuelle Devos in La Porte à côté
  - Agnès Jaoui in Les Uns sur les autres
  - Valérie Lemercier in Un temps de chien
- 2015 : Emmanuelle Devos in Platonov (Platonov)
  - Audrey Bonnet in Répétition
  - Émilie Incerti Formentini in Rendez‐vous Gare de l'Est
  - Vanessa van Durme in Avant que j'oublie
- 2015 : Marie Gillain in Venus in Fur (La Vénus à la fourrure)
  - Myriam Boyer in Chère Elena
  - Fanny Cottençon in On ne se mentira jamais !
  - Miou-Miou in Des gens bien
- 2016 : Dominique Blanc in Les Liaisons Dangereuses
  - Catherine Hiegel in Le Retour au désert
  - Francine Bergé in Bettencourt boulevard ou Une histoire de France
  - Isabelle Huppert in Phèdre(s)
- 2016 : Catherine Frot in Fleur de cactus
  - Dominique Valadié in Who's Afraid of Virginia Woolf? (Qui a peur de Virginia Woolf?)
  - Léa Drucker in Un amour qui ne finit pas
  - Muriel Robin in Momo
- 2017 : Elsa Lepoivre in Les Damnés
  - Romane Bohringer in Les Liaisons Dangereuses
  - Isabelle Carré in Honneur à notre élue
  - Françoise Gillard in Children of a Lesser God
- 2017 : Catherine Arditi in Ensemble
  - Béatrice Agenin in La Louve
  - Clémentine Célarié in Darius
  - Cristiana Reali in M'man

In a public theater show

- 2018 : Marina Hands in Actrice
  - Christiane Cohendy in Scenes from an Execution
  - Catherine Hiegel in La Nostalgie des blattes
  - Anne Kessler in L'Hôtel du libre échange

In a private theater show

- 2018 : Laure Calamy in The Game of Love and Chance
  - Isabelle Carré in The Baby Dance
  - Anne Charrier in Waiting for Bojangles
  - Mélanie Doutey in Douce Amère

In a public theater show

- 2019 : Marina Foïs in Les Idoles
  - Francine Bergé in L'Échange
  - Rachida Brakni in J'ai pris mon père sur mes épaules
  - Florence Viala in The Mistress of the Inn

In a private theater show

- 2019 : Anne Bouvier in Mademoiselle Molière
  - Isabelle Carré in La Dégustation
  - Anne Charrier in The Secretary Bird
  - Cristiana Reali in The Glass Menagerie

=== 2020s ===
In a public theater show

- 2020 : Christine Murillo in The Fly
  - Isabelle Adjani in Opening Night
  - Isabelle Carré in Details
  - Géraldine Martineau in Pompier(s)

In a private theater show

- 2020 : Béatrice Agenin in Marie des poules
  - Catherine Arditi in Madame Zola
  - Léa Drucker in La Dame de chez Maxim
  - Élodie Navarre in Les Beaux

In a public theater show

- 2022 : Clotilde Hesme in Stallone
  - Emeline Bayart in On purge bébé
  - Julie Depardieu in Force Majeure
  - Isabelle Huppert in The Cherry Orchard

In a private theater show

- 2022 : Barbara Schulz in As You Like It
  - Catherine Hiegel in Avant la retraite
  - Vanessa Paradis in Maman
  - Cristiana Reali in Simone Veil – Les combats d’une effrontée

In a public theater show

- 2023 : Sara Giraudeau in Le Syndrome de l'oiseau
  - Isabelle Carré in The Country
  - Catherine Hiegel in Music-Hall
  - Isabelle Huppert in The Glass Menagerie

In a private theater show

- 2023 : Marie-Julie Baup in Oublie-moi
  - Catherine Frot in Lorsque l'enfant parait
  - Isabelle Gélinas in Les Humains
  - Marie Gillain in Sur la tête des enfants

== Multiple wins and nominations ==
Wins	Actors	Nominations
3	Dominique Blanc	4
2	Isabelle Carré	7
2	Suzanne Flon	5
2	Myriam Boyer	4
2	Christine Murillo	3
2	Judith Magre	2

Nominations	Actors
9	Isabelle Huppert
8	Catherine Hiegel
7	Isabelle Carré
6	Cristiana Reali
5	Anny Duperey; Suzanne Flon; Isabelle Gelinas
4	Béatrice Agenin; Dominique Blanc; Myriam Boyer; Catherine Frot; Anouk Grinberg; Danièle Lebrun; Ludmila Mikaël; Dominique Valadié
3	Isabelle Adjani; Francine Bergé; Zabou Breitman; Tsilla Chelton; Emmanuelle Devos; Nicole Garcia; Denise Gence; Christine Murillo; Dominique Reymond; Caroline Silhol
