= A Single Girl =

1995 film by Benoît Jacquot

- Theatrical release poster
- French: La Fille seule
- Directed by: Benoît Jacquot
- Written by: Benoît Jacquot; Jérôme Beaujour
- Produced by: Brigitte Faure; Philippe Carcassonne
- Starring: Virginie Ledoyen; Benoît Magimel; Dominique Valadié; Véra Briole
- Cinematography: Caroline Champetier
- Edited by: Pascale Chavance
- Production companies: Cinéa; La Sept Cinéma
- Distributed by: Pyramide Distribution
- Release date: 29 May 1995 (France)
- Running time: 90 minutes
- Country: France
- Language: French

A Single Girl (French: La Fille seule) is a 1995 French drama film directed by Benoît Jacquot. It follows a day in the life of a young Parisian woman named Valérie (Virginie Ledoyen) who begins a new job at a four-star hotel the same day she reveals to her boyfriend (Benoît Magimel) that she is pregnant. The 90-minute film is shot in real time, with a very mobile camera style, recalling the French New Wave.

This was the breakthrough role for the 19-year-old Ledoyen (who later became known in the United States for the 2000 film The Beach), and earned her a César Award nomination.

== Cast ==
- Virginie Ledoyen as Valérie Sergent
- Benoît Magimel as Rémi
- Dominique Valadié as Valérie's mother
- Véra Briole as Sabine
- Virginie Emane as Fatiah
- Michel Bompoil as Jean-Marc
- Aladin Reibel as M. Sarre
- Jean-Chrétien Sibertin-Blanc as Patrice
- Guillemette Grobon as Mme Charles
- Toni Cecchinato as Italian man
- Giulia Urso as Italian woman
- Matéo Blanc as Fabien, the child
- Jean-Claude Frissung
- Hervé Gamelin as Jean
- Catherine Guittoneau as Jean's lover
- Thang-Long as Mr. Tranh

== Production ==
The film contains a non-simulated sex scene performed by Catherine Guittoneau and Hervé Gamelin. Virginie Ledoyen, who in the scene enters the room where the two are, said that director Benoît Jacquot had not warned her what was behind the door (she knew she was going to find a couple making love, but she did not think they would do it for real).
