= Laure Moulin =

French resistant and teacher (1892–1974)

- Born: Laure Lucy Moulin; 3 December 1892; Saint-Andiol
- Died: 31 December 1974; Montpellier
- Occupation: French resistance fighter

Laure Moulin (December 3, 1892, in Saint-Andiol, Bouches-du-Rhône – December 31, 1974 in Montpellier, France) was a French resistant. A French teacher, she is essentially known for having written the biography of her brother, Jean Moulin.

== Biography ==
Her parents were Antoine-Emile Moulin, a history geography professor and a French politician, and Blanche Pègue from Saint-Andiol. They kept a family house in Saint-Andiol, where their first two children were born, Joseph in 1887 and Laure in 1892. Her brother Jean Moulin the famous French resistant was born in 1899 in Béziers. Joseph died slowly and painfully of peritonitis in 1907 at the age of 19, leaving his family, including Laure, traumatised.

Laure Moulin went to school in Béziers and then to college at the faculty of literature in Montpellier. She obtained a degree in literature, with a specialization in English in 1916.

== Career ==
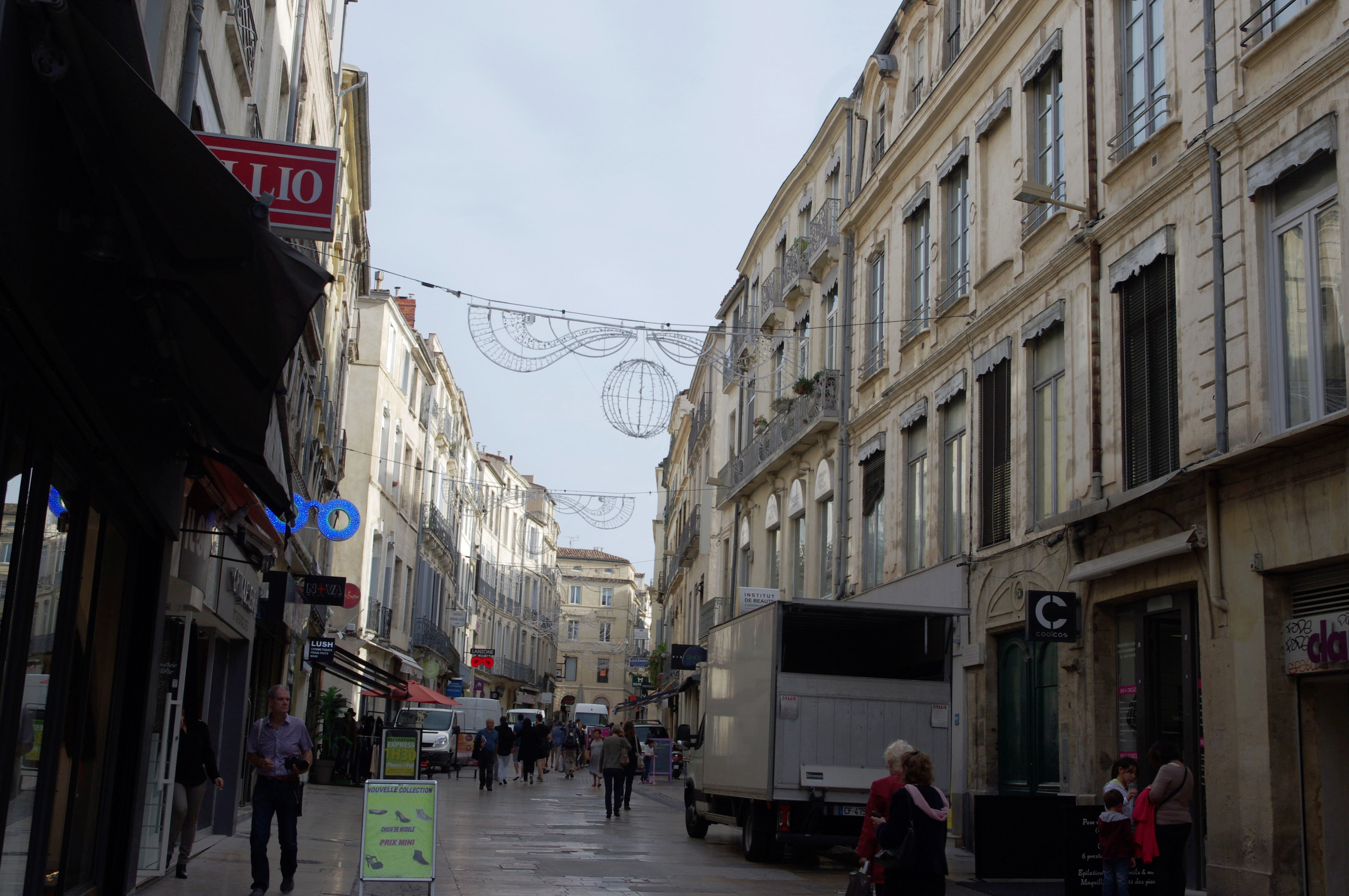
Montpellier, grand rue Jean-Moulin

She became a volunteer nurse during World War I. In 1918 she was nominated as a teacher in the upper primary school of Béziers, where she worked for the following 19 years. Following the death of her brother in 1937, she was nominated as English teacher at the Collège moderne et classique Legouvé, a secondary school in Montpellier.

She moved to this town and chose to live with her mother at 21 de la Grand-Rue (now Grand-Rue Jean Moulin). The apartment would offer a substantial advantage that she analysed when she wrote her brother's biography:

"The apartment had two entries from different stairs and the building was opening on two roads. We did not then think that this disposition would be optimal for secret visits."

Laure Moulin retired in November 1956. She died in Montpellier on December 31, 1974.

== Role during the Résistance ==
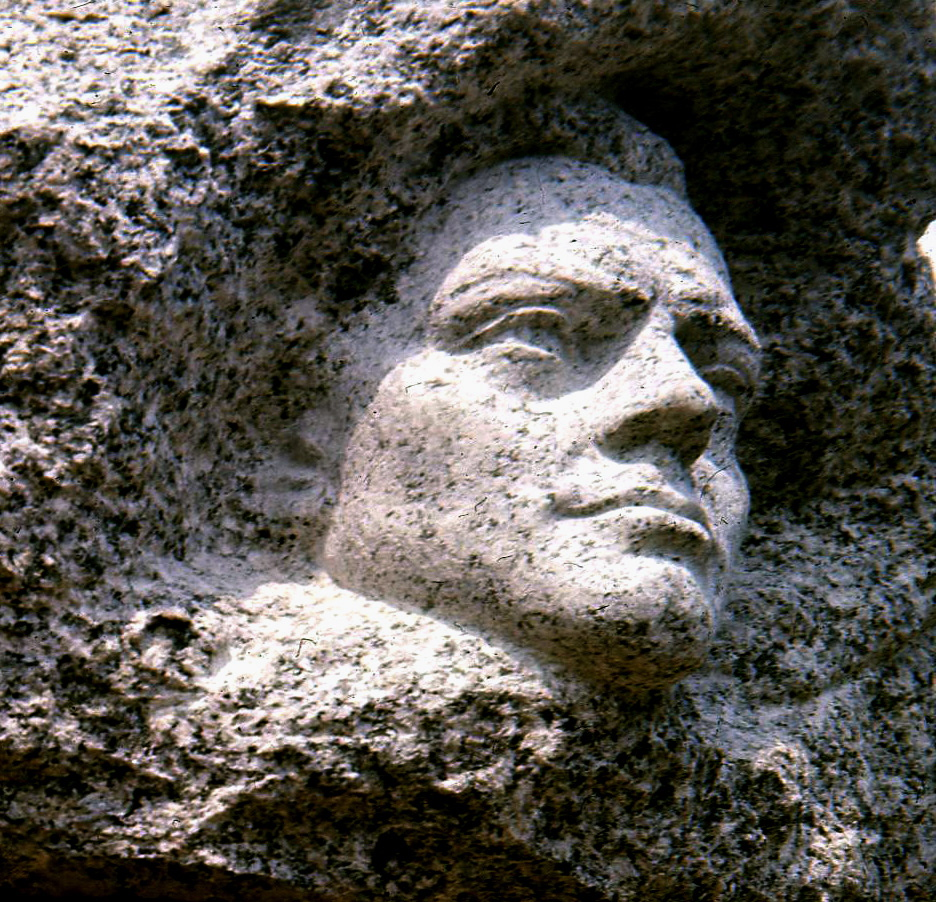
Monument in the memory of Jean Moulin

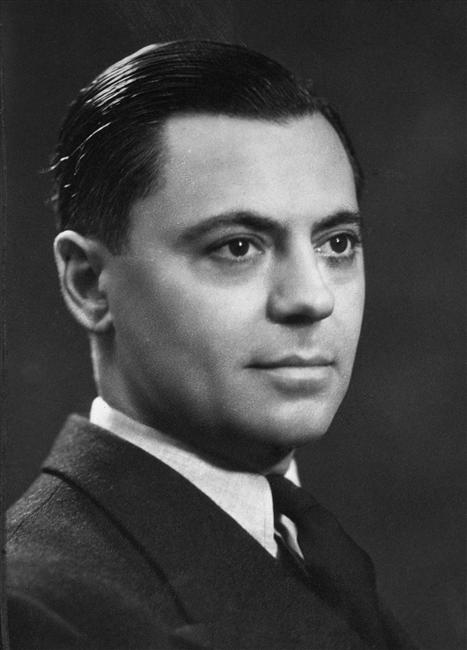
Moulin Harcourt 1937

During World War II, Laure Moulin worked as a secretary for her brother when he came clandestinely to Montpellier. She helped him sometimes late during the night to decipher secret codes.

"I met Rex on average two to three times per week usually in the evening or in the night. He then handed over several messages that I would code myself."

Laure Moulin was assigned on several secret missions by Jean Moulin, like on January 15, 1942, where she did the work of a secret agent. She hid or kept compromising documents. Jean Moulin sometimes kept her away from dangerous situations which would have allowed to trace back to him.

On July 2, 1944, the Gestapo delivered her brother's death certificate, almost one year after his death occurred. She hid his death until October 1946.

As soon as 1946, she started to work for the memory of her brother, listing inauguration places and commemorative monuments concerning him. In 1947, her mother broke her femoral neck and weakened died of a heart attack.

Laure Moulin followed the court cases in 1947 and 1950 against René Hardy, who was accused of betraying Jean Moulin and the resistants oh his group in Caluire.

== Honorific distinctions ==
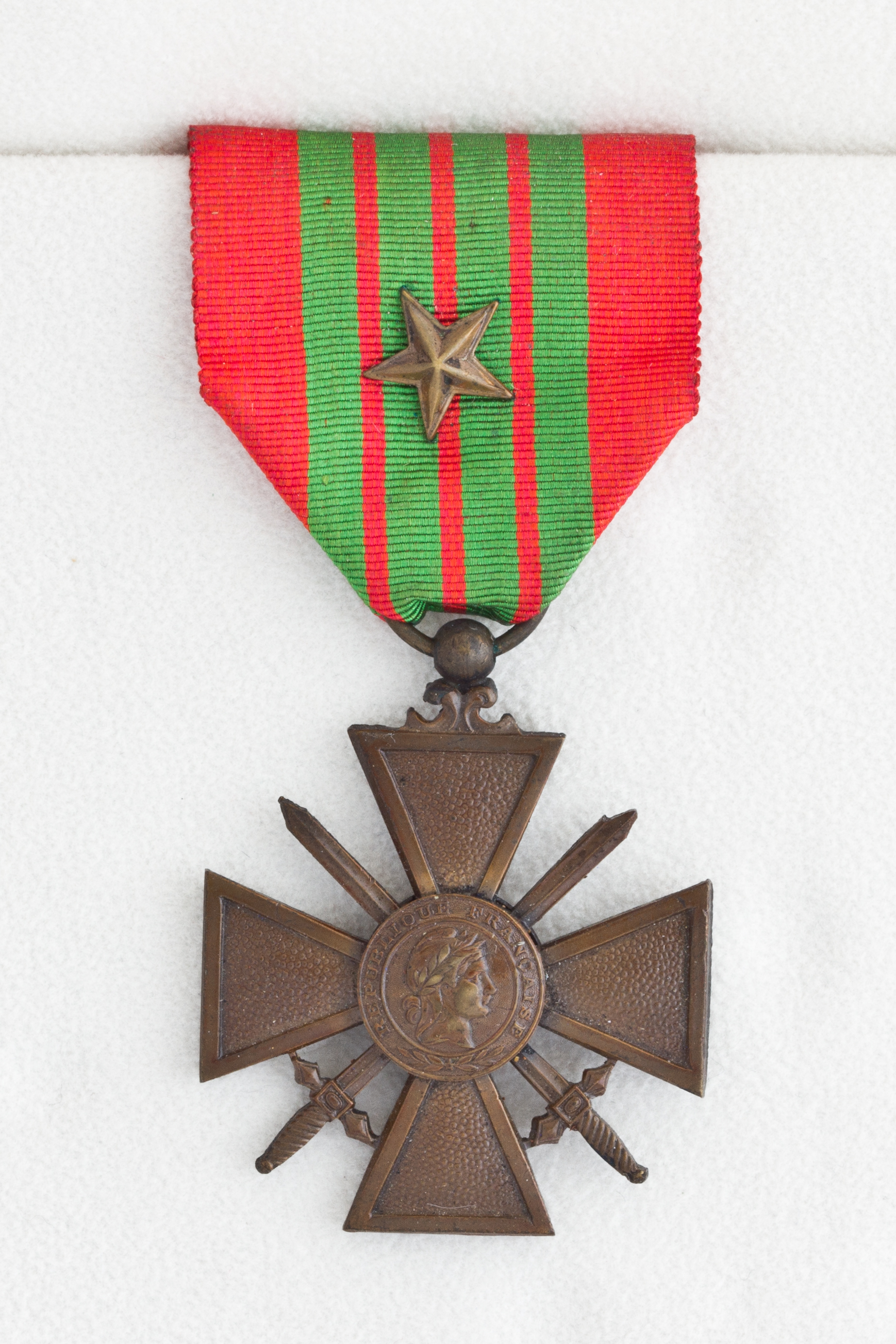
Croix de guerre 1939–1945

Croix de Guerre (October 6, 1946)

Médaille militaire (October 6, 1946)

== Publications ==
- Moulin, Laure. Jean Moulin. Presses de la Cité: Paris, 1982. (En préface le discours de André Malraux). ISBN 2-258-01120-5
