= The Golden Droplet =

1985 novel by Michel Tournier

The Golden Droplet (French: La Goutte d'or) is a 1985 novel by Michel Tournier, published by Éditions Gallimard. Barbara Wright translated the book into English. It was published in English in 1987 in North America by Doubleday, and in the United Kingdom by William Collins, Sons, and later by Methuen Publishing.

== Story ==
In Algeria, a blonde French woman photographs Idris, a Berber whose job is shepherding sheep. The woman is traveling with her husband. Idris, who is 15 years old, is told that he will receive the photograph via the post, but does not. He travels to France to get the photograph and to determine who he is.

He finds a memento, a golden piece of jewelry referred to in the title, before leaving for France. The droplet is a reference to purity, contrasted to decadence and corruption in France. The journey after the initial encounter with the droplet exemplifies the corruption of a previously innocent person. Linda Brandon of The Independent stated that the cultures seen in Western countries and "social injustice" victimize Idris. Michiko Kakutani wrote that Idris is "a kind of teenage Candide".

The author makes references to literary figures and anti-North African racism in France. Bruce Allen wrote in the Chicago Tribune that The Golden Droplet "aims to be a parable about the prominence of images in our imaginations, and their effects on our lives".

== Reception ==
Michiko Kakutani wrote that the novel suffers in the second half, set in Paris, as parts "seem contrived".

Bruce Allen found that the novel "offers a masterly display of rhetorical and structural skills".

Julian Barnes of The Observer wrote that overall the novel's author exhibits "seriously playful, humorous, and life-examining" qualities, though he wished the novel would have been more content about France and that the scenes in North Africa had taken up so much of the book. According to Barnes, the English title is "an accurate if unalluring translation of" the original French title.

Lewis Buzbee, a writer in San Francisco, wrote that the work has the quality of a mystery novel and he praised how the work "does not get bogged down".

Edward Guereschi of Newsday wrote that the work, in its home country, was a bestseller.

Sara Melzer of the University of California, Los Angeles wrote in the Los Angeles Times that she disliked the book, criticizing the perceived shallowness and lack of logic behind the actions of Idris, and arguing the characters are "marionettelike". She concluded the work "ends up being satisfying neither as philosophy nor as novel."

Robert Taylor of the Boston Globe wrote that he found Idris "too simple" a character, who he exemplifies the "noble savage" stereotype.

Kirkus Reviews stated that the work succeeds if the audience accepts Idris's "simplicity", and that the work is intended to be "a big-picture theme" instead of analyzing characters' motivations.

Publishers Weekly praised the "dazzling visual quality" of the storyline and the discussions about one's conceptions of oneself and comparisons of cultures.

Guereschi stated that the novel is "a good place" to become familiar with the author's style.

== Adaptations ==
There is a 1990 TV movie, directed by Marcel Bluwal. Le Monde praised the adaptation for properly condensing the text.
