= Snakes and Ladders (1980 film) =

Zig-Zag
- Film poster
- Directed by: Raúl Ruiz
- Written by: Raúl Ruiz and Jean-Loup Rivière
- Produced by: France 2 (FR2) and Centre Georges Pompidou
- Cinematography: Alain Montrobert
- Edited by: Annie C. Bequet
- Music by: Jorge Arriagada
- Distributed by: Gemini Video Editions
- Release dates: 17 September 1980 (France); 7 February 1997 (Spain)
- Running time: 30 minutes
- Country: France
- Language: French

Zig-Zag, Snakes and Ladders (a didactic fiction about cartography), and also known in French as Le jeu de l'oie (Une fiction didactique à propos de la cartographie), is a French surrealist short film made in 1980. It was written and directed by Chilean filmmaker Raúl Ruiz and produced by France 2 to promote a new map exhibition at the Pompidou Centre in Paris and was shot in Europe for French television. The film was eventually distributed throughout France and in Spain. It stars Pascal Bonitzer and Jean-Loup Rivière.

In the film, Pascal Bonitzer plays a man named "H" who has just awoken in his car in the countryside with no idea of what has happened. Unable to start the car, he decides to look for help and finds two men playing the board game "Snakes and Ladders" and eventually becomes immersed in the game, which becomes (sur)real. He follows the rules and is guided throughout it by a partner who appears from nowhere, played by Jean-Loup Rivière. As he attempts to win the game, H realizes that the scale of the cartography of the board game is ever expanding. Whilst seeking to escape from his didactic nightmare of a real life dream, he travels across Paris, through France and Europe, around the Earth, and eventually to the cosmos.

The short film was premiered on September 17, 1980 on French television and was distributed by Gemini Video Editions. Later the film was distributed in Spain for viewers on February 7, 1997. Originally shown in French, it was later subtitled in Spanish, English, and many other languages.

== Plot ==
"H" (Pascal Bonitzer) wakes up in his car, uninjured and with no signs of an accident. It won't start, so he walks away. He tells two men playing a board game in a field that his car has broken down and he is late for an appointment; they offer no help. H asks how long they have been playing and the nearest man (Jean-Loup Rivière) replies they have been playing a very long time. Asked if they should roll the dice, the man looks to the sky, carefully arranges the dice, counts the spaces on the board, and tells the other player "You have one hour". The male narrator says, "H realizes he is a victim of a nightmare", as H looks up and sees a hand rolling dice in the sky. The first man tells H where to go, the narrator saying, "H realizes he is the victim of the worst type of nightmare, a didactic nightmare".

As H and the second man move in accordance with rolls of the dice, a female narrator describes the game's rules. In Paris, a voice calls H from a warehouse; it is the first man he met. H, feeling that he is being played with, approaches the man who tells him he risks being late. Saying he wants to stop, H points to the board game's final square, but the man says someone is waiting for him at another tile; H hurries to his next destination. After he leaves the man reveals several versions of the game's board H is ignorant of.

Another player in the game (also Jean-Loup Rivière) advises H to always take unseen routes. The female narrator discusses how to resolve a labyrinth; a map enlarges one's field of vision to destroy a maze. As H travels, he meets a blind player who follows a sound map; the female narrator says such maps show travellers are going in the correct direction when the route follows a complete melody.

Entering a church after the first man he met calls him from the roof, H realizes the church is also part of the game. Told that the board game's scale has moved from a district of Paris to the whole city, H is nauseous with vertigo and vomits two dice. Asked to vomit again so the man can have a turn, H says his ears hurt; the dice are in H's ears and he and the man hurry along.

Called from a car outside the church, H climbs in and realizes it's part of the game. The female narrator describes three hypotheses: the map is old and the city has changed, making it inaccurate; the map is a developmental model of the city, which the city doesn't yet resemble; or the city has been destroyed and rebuilt using many maps, a combination of the first two hypotheses. Saying they need a perfect map, she suggests that either they create one using street-by-street analysis, making the map 1:1, or they create a map of all possible routes stored on videodiscs for the army or tourists/travellers. Meanwhile, H sees the first man in another car. H is told the scale has changed again and that he needs to go to the station. In the car's rear view mirror he sees new dice numbers reflected in his driver's sunglasses.

On a train, H talks to the second man he saw playing the game in the field and discovers that all of the passengers are playing the game. The man tells H he is "the one who answers questions". H asks him "What is the connection between routes and maps?" but falls asleep; in his dream, H has a new nightmare in which dice are rolled and he is ordered off the train.

H and the first man he met are in an aeroplane flying over Europe, the game's new scale, heading towards the Montfossis (fake mountains used by cartographers to converge two ranges on a map). H sleeps and dreams they are flying over maps in an exhibition and are travelling not in space, but in time. As they fly over multiple labyrinth maps the man says they are in the eye of the dice. A new dice rolls which changes the scale to encompass the whole planet Earth. H loses consciousness in the thin air the plane is flying in.

Waking up sitting on a giant hand, H sees the dice and rolls them, but the hand closes in on him. As it opens, H realizes he is both the dice in the game he is in and also the player rolling them. H disappears leaving only the dice behind. The scale changes to that of the universe. As they travel the cosmos, a man tells him that they are not dead, but the Earth is because there is no more time and therefore no space. Observing the universe and the Earth, H realizes he is waking up but doesn't know which dream he will wake in. Finally, H is back again in the field where he first found the men playing the game.

== Full cast and crew ==
- Pascal Bonitzer as "H" - Actor
- Jean-Loup Rivière as "The One Who Answers Questions" - Actor
- Serge Brodsky - Second Unit Director or Assistant Director
- Janine Knuth - Artistic Collaborator
- Jean Hertz - Sound Mixer
- Roger Vieyra - Sound Crew

== Reception ==
=== Interpretations and analysis ===
The film was said to be considered as an "allegory that condenses and emblematizes not only themes from Ruiz's work as a whole, but also key dimensions of his filmmaking practice" (Goddard 2). Zig-Zag shows the form of filmography that really describes Ruiz's style, as the film presents this idea how a film can be a type of impossible cartography that is always changing and never secured. The film presents Ruiz's style when it plays with the ability to critique representation within film as the character H takes us through many representations of territory and representations of territories through maps as Ruiz uses cinema, dreams, and cartographic explorations (Goddard 4). Representation to Ruiz is a means to expose the invisible and to put forward to an audience things which cannot be seen "using the capacity of images", because" they are too abstract or their nature is divine" so that they may be understood truthfully to reveal or render evident/certain realities which cannot be shown" (Ruiz 36). When the film uses these images of maps as representations of territories, Ruiz is able to challenge the logic of cartographers and how their representation may not be fully true, as cities may always undergo change and cities may be destroyed, or even both. In the film, it presents this paradox between territory and the image of territory showing us how territories and their maps are concrete yet abstract at the same time since a territory is physical and an image of the territory (map) is abstract or created, revealing the uncertainty of representation.

== Awards and nominations ==
None year to date: 1 March 2017
