= Simon Eine =

French actor (1936–2020)

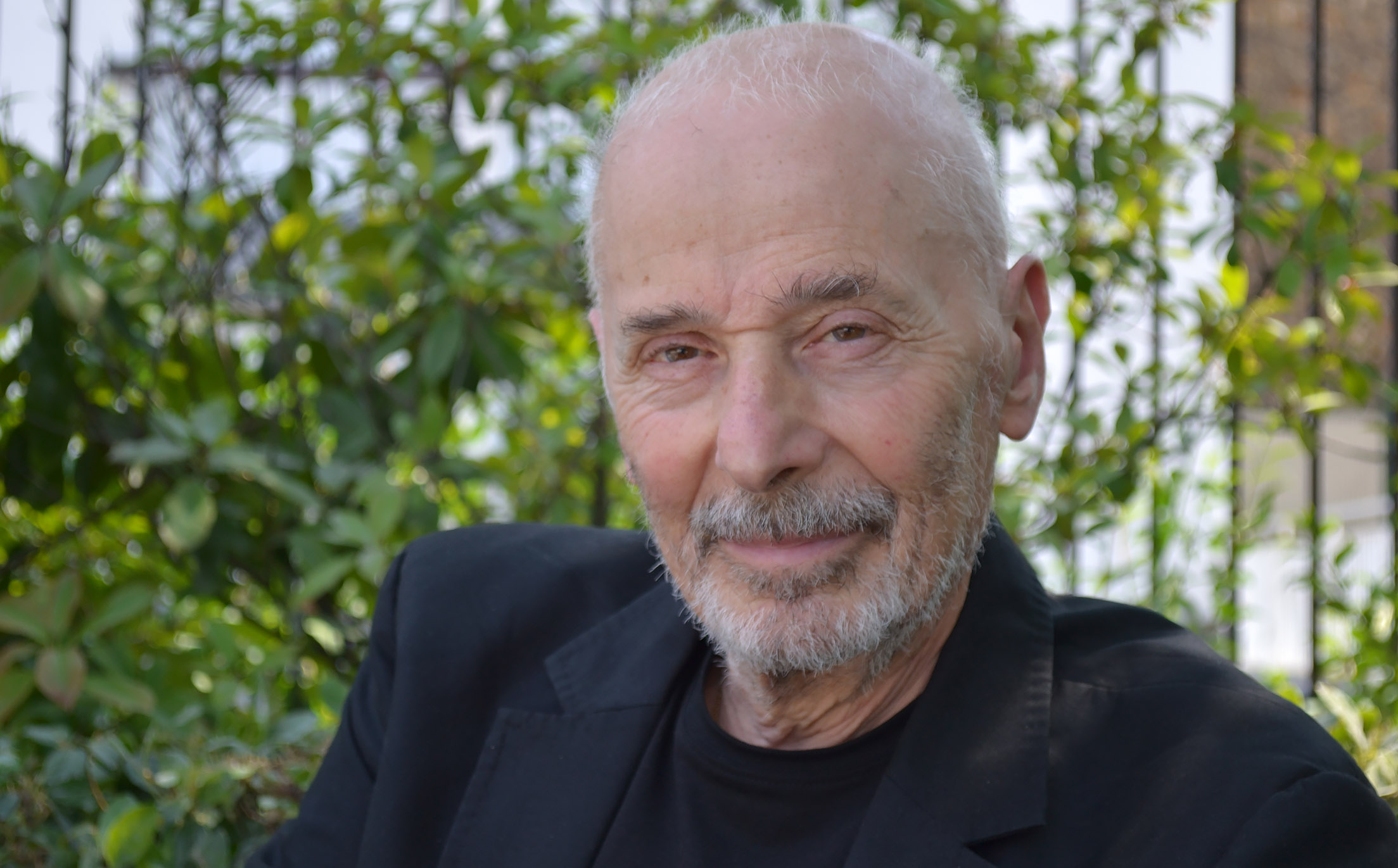
- Eine in 2011
- Born: 8 August 1936; Paris, France
- Died: 30 September 2020 (aged 84); Nice, France
- Occupation: Actor

Simon Eine (8 August 1936 – 30 September 2020) was a French actor. He studied at CNSAD under the direction of Jean Yonnel. He was once honorary secretary of the Comédie-Française.

== Filmography ==
=== Cinema ===
- Le Roi Lear (1965)
- Au théâtre ce soir (1968)
- Les Stances à Sophie (1971)
- Another Man, Another Chance (1977)
- The Reader (1988)
- Catherene de Médicis (1988)
- L'Autrichienne (1989)
- Jeanne d'Arc (1989)
- Les Hordes (1990)
- RSVP (1992)
- Descente aux enfers (1992)
- Fin de droit (1992)
- La Nuit du destin (1997)
- Duval (1999)
- Une nouvelle vie (1999)
- La Mort oubliée (1999)
- Largo Winch (2000)
- Requiem (2001)
- Notre musique (2003)
- Le Tuteur (2003)
- Sarah's Key (2010)
- Celles qui aimaient Richard Wagner (2011)

=== Television ===
- La Lumière noire
- The Founding Boy (1980)
- Nestor Burma (1993)
- Les Interminables (2007)

== Publications ==
- Des étoiles plein les poches (2012)
- Humeurs variables : Le sourire du babouin et autres nouvelles (2016)
- Portraits d'Acteurs de la Comédie-Française (2019)

== Decorations ==
- Knight of the Legion of Honour (1997)
- Officer of the Ordre national du Mérite
- Officer of the Ordre des Arts et des Lettres

== Awards ==
- 1st Prize of Modern Comedy for his role as Brutus in Julius Caesar (1960)
- 2nd Prize of Classical Comedy for his role of Alceste in The Misanthrope (1960)
- 2nd Prize of Tragedy for his role of Titus in Bérénice (1960)
