= Philippe Haïm =

French film director, writer and composer

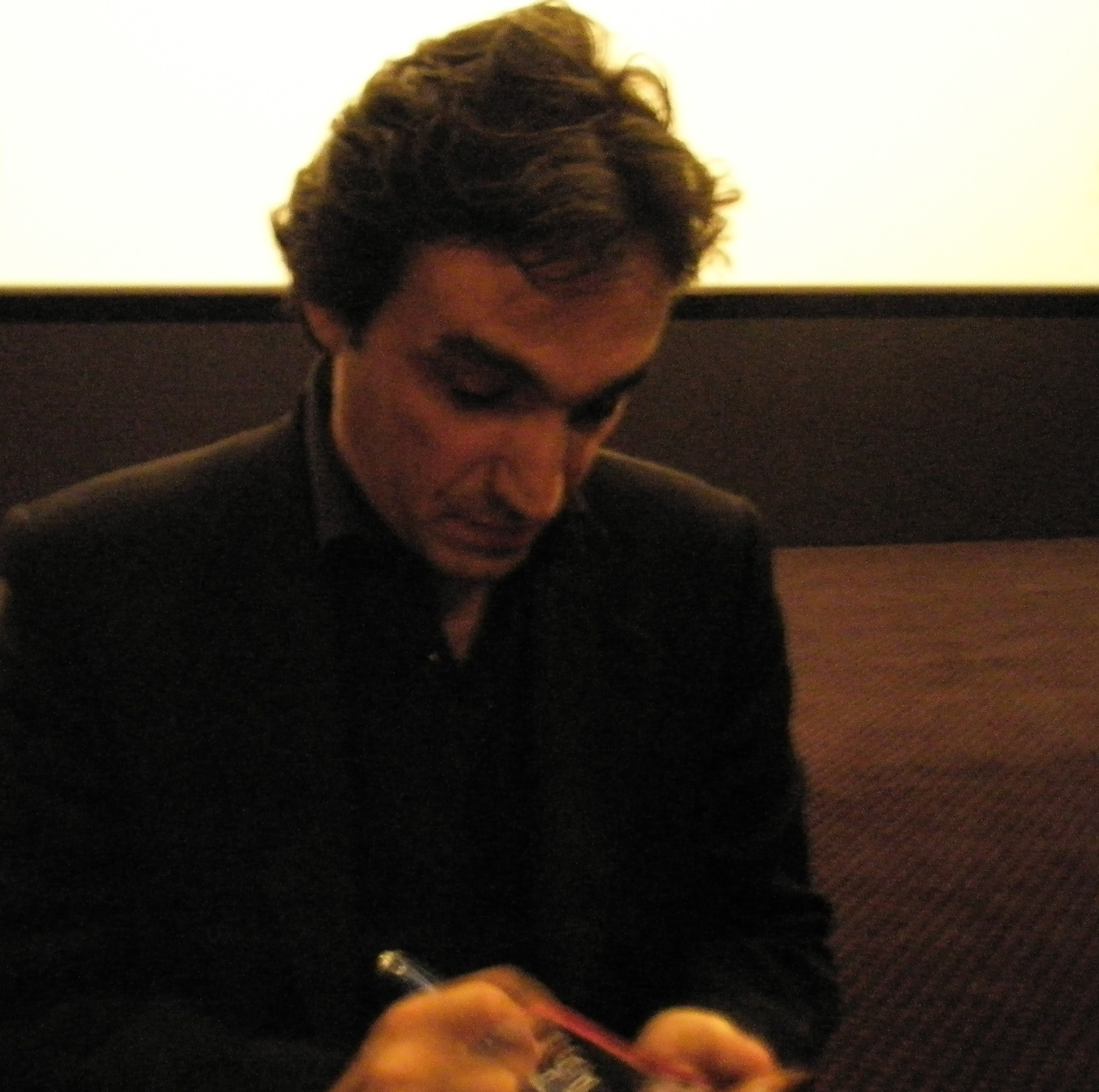
- Philippe Haïm
- Born: 2 September 1967 (age 58); Paris
- Occupations: Director, writer and composer

Philippe Haïm (born 2 September 1967 in Paris) is a French film director, writer and composer. He sometimes is also actor, as in Comme un poisson hors de l'eau (1999).

== Filmography ==
- 1986: Maine Océan
- 1991: Les Naufragés
- 1992: Voyage à Rome
- 1994: Carences
- 1994: Descente
- 1995: Double Express
- 1995: The Bait (L'Appât)
- 1995: Entre ces mains-là
- 1995: Mademoiselle Pompom
- 1997: Barracuda
- 1997: Zardock ou les malheurs d'un suppôt
- 1997: Haine comme normal
- 1997: Il faut que ça brille
- 1999: Comme un poisson hors de l'eau
- 2000: Bluff
- 2004: Les Dalton
- 2008: Secret Defense
