= Éric Vigner =

French actor, theatre director, scenic designer (born 1960)

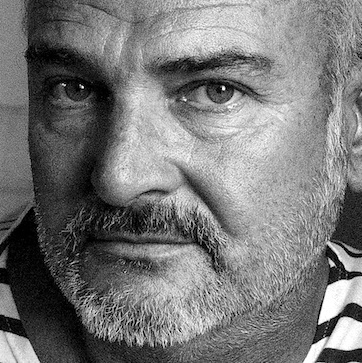
- Éric Vigner in 2015.
- Born: 27 October 1960 (age 65); Rennes, France
- Education: École Nationale Supérieure des Arts et Techniques du Théâtre (ENSATT); Conservatoire national supérieur d'art dramatique (CNSAD), Paris
- Occupations: Actor, theatre director, scenic designer
- Awards: Nomination Molière Awards 1996; French-Corean Cultural Prize 2004; Officier de l'Ordre des Arts et des Lettres

Éric Vigner (born 27 October 1960, in Rennes, France) is a French stage director, actor and scenic designer.

He directed the Centre Dramatique National Théâtre de Lorient (CDDB-Théâtre de Lorient) in Lorient, from 1996 to 2015.

== Early life and education ==
Vigner was born in Rennes.

Éric Vigner graduated in visual arts from the University of Brittany, France. He then studied in Paris, at the École Nationale Supérieure des Arts et Techniques du Théâtre (ENSATT) and the Conservatoire national supérieur d'art dramatique (CNSAD).

== Career ==
In 1990, he founded his own theater company, Suzanne M. Éric Vigner. In 1996, he was appointed by the French Minister of Culture to direct Brittany's Drama Centre, henceforth called the CDDB-Théâtre de Lorient.

Since 1996, the graphic artists M/M Paris were in charge of the CDDB's visual communication. Besides Vigner's commitment to contemporary playwrights, including Marguerite Duras and Roland Dubillard, for which he was awarded the honour of Chevalier dans l'Ordre des Arts et des Lettres in 1998, Vigner developed a new approach to the French classics – Racine's Bajazet (Comédie-Française, 1995), Corneille's L’Illusion Comique (Théâtre Nanterre-Amandiers, 1996), Victor Hugo's Marion De Lorme (Théâtre de la Ville, 1999), Molière's L’École des femmes (Comédie-Française, 1999) and Le Bourgeois gentilhomme (French-Korea cultural prize 2004) and William Shakespeare's Othello (Odéon – Théâtre de l’Europe, 2008).

In October 2010, Vigner founded an international theater academy, "The Academy", which follows the principles of a little democracy and assembles seven young trilingual actors from seven cultural backgrounds – Morocco, Romania, Mali, Belgium, South Korea, Germany, and Israel. They work on classical as well as contemporary forms of writing and present La Place Royale by Pierre Corneille, Guantanamo by Frank Smith and La Faculté by Christophe Honoré.

He has developed international collaborations to last over the years, searching for a genuine mutual cultural transmission. He has directed in different languages and cultural backgrounds: at the National Theater of Korea in Seoul, The Bourgeois Gentleman by Molière and Jean-Baptiste Lully (French-Korean Cultural Prize 2004); twice at the National Theater of Albania, Tirana, 2007,The Barber of Seville by Beaumarchais (Price Festival Bharat Rang Mahotsav, Inde 2011), and 2016, Lucrezia Borgia by Victor Hugo (Festival Theatre National de Bretagne, France 2017); at 7 Stages Theater, Atlanta, 2008, In the Solitude of Cotton Fields by Bernard-Marie Koltès (U.S. Koltès Project); in India, Gates to India Song based on The Vice Consul and India Song by Marguerite Duras (Festival Bonjour India, Bombay, Calcutta, New-Delhi, 2013).

At the Odeon Theatre in Bucharest, 2016, during Romania's campaign for Unesco's approval of The Wisdom of the Earth sculpture by Constantin Brâncuși, he staged the famous trial from 1928 – Brancusi versus the United States.

=== Actor ===
- 1983: L'Instruction by Peter Weiss, directed by Robert Angebaud, Church in Saint-Étienne, Rennes
- 1984: La mort de Pompée by Pierre Corneille, directed by Brigitte Jaques, Lierre-Théâtre, Paris
- 1985: Fantasio by Alfred de Musset, directed by Vincent Garanger, CNSAD, Paris
- 1985: Romeo and Juliet by Shakespeare, directed by René Jauneau, Festival de Valréas
- 1986: Elvire Jouvet 40 directed by Brigitte Jaques, International Tour, film by Benoît Jacquot 1988
- 1988: Chouans ! Film by Philippe de Broca
- 1988: L'Épreuve by Marivaux, directed by Jean-Pierre Miquel, Festival d'Avignon
- 1989: Sophonisbe by Pierre Corneille, directed by Brigitte Jaques, Théâtre national de Chaillot, Paris
- 1989: Horace by Pierre Corneille, directed by Brigitte Jaques, Théâtre national de Chaillot, Paris
- 1990: Le Misanthrope by Molière, directed by Christian Colin, Centre Dramatique National de Gennevilliers, Paris
- 2018: Plaire, aimer et courir vite, film by Christophe Honoré

=== Theatre productions ===
- 1988: La Place royale by Pierre Corneille, CNSAD, Paris
- 1991: La Maison d'os by Roland Dubillard, Festival d'Automne, Grande Arche de la Défense, Paris
- 1992: Le Régiment de Sambre et Meuse, based on the works of Alphonse Allais, Louis-Ferdinand Céline, Jean Genet, Roland Dubillard, Georges Courteline, Franz Marc, Quartz Brest
- 1993: La Pluie d'été by Marguerite Duras, Masterclass CNSAD, Quartz Brest, National and International Tour
- 1993: Le soir de l'Obériou – Elizavieta Bam by Daniil Charms, Theater Laboratory Anatoli Vasiliev, Moscow
- 1994: Le Jeune Homme by Jean Audureau, Théâtre de la Commune Aubervilliers
- 1994: Reviens à toi (encore) (Looking at You (Revived) Again) by Grégory Motton, Odéon Theatre, Paris
- 1995: Bajazet by Jean Racine, created at the Comédie-Française, Paris
- 1996: L'Illusion comique by Pierre Corneille, CDDB - Théâtre de Lorient, National Tour
- 1996: Brancusi contre États-Unis, un procès historique, 1928, adapted for the stage by Éric Vigner, 50th Festival d'Avignon, Centre Georges Pompidou, Tribunal de Pau
- 1998: Toi cour, moi jardin by Jacques Rebotier, CDDB - Théâtre de Lorient
- 1998: Marion Delorme by Victor Hugo, Théâtre de la Ville, Paris, National Tour
- 1998: La Douleur (The War) by Marguerite Duras, CDDB - Théâtre de Lorient
- 1999: L'École des femmes (The School for Wives) by Molière, Comédie-Française, Paris
- 2000: Rhinocéros by Eugène Ionesco, CDDB - Théâtre de Lorient
- 2001: La Bête dans la jungle The Beast in the Jungle, adapted by Marguerite Duras, CDDB - Théâtre de Lorient, Espace Go, Montreal, John F. Kennedy Center for the Performing Arts
- 2002: Savannah Bay by Marguerite Duras, Comédie-Française, Paris, Nationale Tour
- 2003: ...Où boivent les vaches by Roland Dubillard, CDDB - Théâtre de Lorient, Théâtre du Rond-Point, Paris, Nationale Tour
- 2004: Le Jeu du kwi-jok ou Le Bourgeois gentilhomme (The Bourgeois Gentleman) by Molière and Jean-Baptiste Lully, National Theater of Korea in Seoul, Opéra-Comique, Paris
- 2006: Pluie d'été à Hiroshima, based on the works of Marguerite Duras La Pluie d'été and Hiroshima mon amour, 60th Festival d'Avignon, Cloître des Carmes, National Tour.
- 2007: Jusqu'à ce que la mort nous sépareby Rémi De Vos, Théâtre du Rond-Point, Paris
- 2007: Le Barbier de Séville (The Barber of Seville) by Pierre Augustin Caron de Beaumarchais, National Theater of Albania Tirana
- 2007: Savannah Bay by Marguerite Duras, created at Théâtre Espace Go, Montreal
- 2007: Débrayage by Rémi De Vos, CDDB - Théâtre de Lorient
- 2008: In the Solitude of Cotton Fields by Bernard-Marie Koltès, 7 Stages Theater in Atlanta
- 2008: Othello by William Shakespeare, CDDB - Théâtre de Lorient, Odéon Theatre, Paris
- 2009: Sextett by Rémi De Vos, CDDB - Théâtre de Lorient, Théâtre du Rond-Point, Paris, Espace Go, Montreal
- 2010: Le Barbier de Séville (The Barber of Seville) by Pierre Augustin Caron de Beaumarchais
- 2011: La Place Royale by Pierre Corneille, CDDB - Théâtre de Lorient
- 2011: Guantanamo by Frank Smith, Centre Dramatique National Orléans/Loiret/Centre
- 2012: La Faculté by Christophe Honoré, Festival d'Avignon
- 2013: Gates to India Song, based on the works of Marguerite Duras's India Song and Le Vice-Consul, Festival Bonjour India, Delhi (Residence de France (ambassade)); Kolkata (Tagore House, Rabindra Bharati University); Mumbai (Prithvi Theatre et NCPA)
- 2014: Tristan by Éric Vigner
- 2015: L'Illusion comique de Corneille, CDDB-Théâtre de Lorient
- 2016: Brâncuși impotriva Americii, Odeon Theater, Bucharest, Romania
- 2017: Lukrecia Borxhia, by Victor Hugo, Albanian National Theater, Tirana
- 2018 : Partage de midi by Paul Claudel, Théâtre National de Strasbourg
- 2019 : Partage de midi by Paul Claudel, Théâtre de la Ville, Paris, Festival Croisements, China

=== Opera productions ===
- 2000: La Didone, opera by Francesco Cavalli, musical director Christophe Rousset, Montpellier Opera
- 2003: L'Empio punito, opera by Alessandro Melani, musical director Christophe Rousset, Leipzig Opera
- 2004: Antigona, opera by Tommaso Traetta, Montpellier Opera, Chatelet Theatre, Paris
- 2013: Orlando, opera by George Frideric Handel, musical director Jean-Christophe Spinosi, Théâtre de Lorient

=== Scenic designs ===
- 1983: L'instruction by Peter Weiss, directed by Robert Angebaud
- 1984: La Casa Nova by Carlo Goldoni, directed by Robert Angebaud
- 1984: Peinture-sur-Bois by Ingmar Bergman, directed by François Kergoulay
- 1985: Pusuda Le Guetteur by Cahit Atay, directed by François Kergourlay
- 1986: La Place royale by Pierre Corneille
- 1990: La Maison d'os by Roland Dubillard
- 1992: Le Régiment de Sambre et Meuse based on the works of Alphonse Allais, Louis-Ferdinand Céline, Jean Genet, Roland Dubillard, Georges Courteline, Franz Marc
- 1993: La Pluie d'été by Marguerite Duras
- 1993: Le soir de l'Obériou - Elizavieta Bam by Daniil Charms
- 1994: Le Jeune Homme by Jean Audureau
- 1994: Reviens à toi (encore) by Grégory Motton
- 1996: L'Illusion comique by Pierre Corneille
- 2000: Rhinocéros by Eugène Ionesco
- 2000: La Didone, opera composed by Francesco Cavalli, musical director Christophe Rousset
- 2001: La Bête dans la jungle adapted by Marguerite Duras, based on the play by James Lord and the novel by Henry James
- 2002: Savannah Bay by Marguerite Duras
- 2003: ...Où boivent les vaches by Roland Dubillard
- 2003: L'Empio punito, opera by Alessandro Melani, musical director Christophe Rousset
- 2004: Le Jeu du kwi-jok ou Le Bourgeois gentilhomme by Molière, music by Jean-Baptiste Lully
- 2004: Place des Héros (Heldenplatz) by Thomas Bernhard, directed by Arthur Nauzyciel at the Comédie-Française
- 2007: Jusqu'à ce que la mort nous sépare by Rémi De Vos
- 2007: Le Barbier de Séville (The Barber of Seville) by Pierre Augustin Caron de Beaumarchais
- 2007: Savannah Bay by Marguerite Duras
- 2007: Débrayage by Rémi De Vos
- 2008: In the Solitude of Cotton Fields by Bernard-Marie Koltès
- 2008: Othello by William Shakespeare
- 2009: Sextett by Rémi De Vos
- 2010: Le Barbier de Séville (The Barber of Seville) by Pierre Augustin Caron de Beaumarchais
- 2011: La Place Royale by Pierre Corneille
- 2011: Guantanamo by Frank Smith
- 2012: La Faculté by Christophe Honoré
- 2013: Gates to India Song, based on the works of Marguerite Duras India Song and Le Vice-Consul, Festival Bonjour India, Delhi (Residence de France (ambassade)); Kolkata (Tagore House, Rabindra Bharati University); Mumbai (Prithvi Theatre et NCPA)
- 2013: Orlando, opera composed by George Frideric Handel, musical director Jean-Christophe Spinosi, Théâtre de Lorient
- 2014: Tristan by Éric Vigner
- 2017: Lukrecia Borxhia, by Victor Hugo, Albanian National Theater, Tirana
- 2018 : Partage de midi by Paul Claudel, Théâtre National de Strasbourg

=== The Academy ===
- 2011 : La Place Royale by Pierre Corneille, CDDB-Théâtre de Lorient
- 2011 : Guantanamo by Frank Smith, Centre Dramatique National d'Orléans
- 2012 : La Faculté by Christophe Honoré, Cours du Lycée Mistral, Festival d'Avignon

=== Decorations ===
- Officer of the Order of Arts and Letters (2015)
