= Jean-Loup Rivière =

French playwright and drama critic

- Born: 10 January 1948; Caen, France
- Died: 23 November 2018 (aged 70); Paris, France
- Education: University of Caen; École pratique des hautes études
- Occupations: Playwright; Drama critic
- Children: Constance Rivière

Jean-Loup Rivière (10 January 1948 – 23 November 2018) was a French playwright and drama critic.

== Biography ==
Jean-Loup Rivière was born on 10 January 1948 in Caen, France.

He studied philosophy at the University of Caen, and led the Theatrical Research Group from 1969 to 1972. He wrote his doctoral thesis at École pratique des hautes études and began teaching at Paris West University Nanterre La Défense on 15 December 2001.

Rivière led the Atelier de création radiophonique on French culture from 1973 to 1983. He was also in charge of studies at Centre Georges Pompidou from 1977 to 1980, a drama critic at Libération from 1981 to 1982, a general secretary from 1983 to 1986, and a literary and artistic councillor at Comédie-Française from 1986 to 2001.

Rivière taught as a lecturer at the Institute of Theatre Studies for the University of Paris III: Sorbonne Nouvelle from 1995 to 2001. He was also a professor of theatre studies at the École normale supérieure de Lyon and a professor of dramaturgy at Conservatoire national supérieur d'art dramatique (CNSAD).
