= Legouvé =

Legouvé is a surname, and may refer to:

- Jean-Baptiste Legouvé (1729–1783)
- Gabriel-Marie Legouvé (1764–1812), French poet, son of J. B.
- Ernest Legouvé (1807–1903), French dramatist, son of Gabriel-Marie

Also See:

- Ernest Legouve Reef
