= Muriel Mayette-Holtz =

French actress (born 1964)

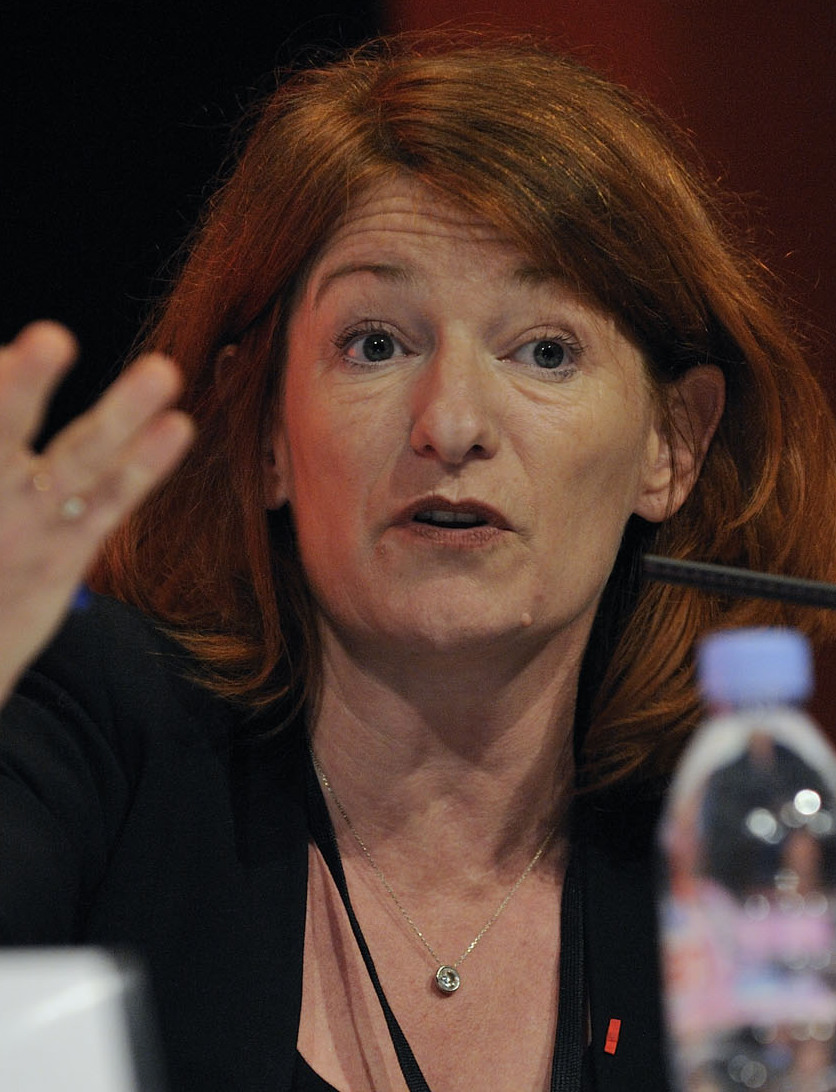
- Mayette in 2011
- Born: 2 May 1964 (age 61); Paris, France
- Occupation: director of the French Academy in Rome – Villa Medici

Muriel Mayette (born 2 May 1964) is a French actress.

== Life and career ==
At the age of 14, Mayette followed the lectures of Marcel Tassencourt in Versailles. From 1980 to 1982, she studied at the National School of Arts and Theatre Technique (ENSATT) in Lyon, then from 1982 until 1985, at the French National Academy of Dramatic Arts, studying under Michel Bouquet, Claude Régy, and Bernard Dort.

From March 2008, Mayette was part of the commission led by Hugues Gall initiated by Minister of Culture Christine Albanel, to provide the post of director of the Villa Medici in Rome.

Mayette is an Officier de l'Ordre des Arts et des Lettres.

Mayette joined the Comédie-Française on 15 September 1985, at the age of 20, and she became a sociétaire on 1 January 1988. She worked with Antoine Vitez, Jacques Lassalle and Alain Françon.

A teacher at the French National Academy of Dramatic Arts, she also directed eight productions, of which the last was the play "Le Retour au désert" (Return to the Desert) by Bernard-Marie Koltès.

Mayette was appointed administrateur général of Comédie-Française from 4 August 2006, replacing Marcel Bozonnet. She is the first woman to occupy the post in the 300-year history of the Comédie-Française.

== Selected filmography ==
Year	Title	Role	Notes
1994	Coming to Terms with the Dead	Zaza's colleague	
1998	Tell Me I'm Dreaming	Jeanne	
2014	Number One Fan	Arlette	
