= Secret Defense (2008 film) =

- Directed by: Philippe Haïm
- Starring: Gérard Lanvin; Vahina Giocante
- Release date: 10 December 2008 (France)
- Running time: 100 min
- Country: France
- Language: French
- Budget: $12 million
- Box office: $4.6 million

Secret Defense is a 2008 French thriller film directed by Philippe Haïm.

== Cast ==
- Gérard Lanvin - Alex
- Vahina Giocante - Diane / Lisa
- Nicolas Duvauchelle - Pierre
- Mehdi Nebbou - Ahmed
- Rachida Brakni - Leïla / Chadia
- Catherine Hiegel - Pierre's mother
- Simon Abkarian - Al Barad
- Aurélien Wiik - Jérémy
- Nicolas Marié - Fouche
- Katia Lewkowicz - Aline
- Kamel Belghazi - Aziz
