= Guy Rétoré =

French director (1924–2018)

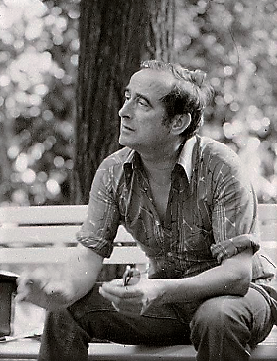
- Born: 7 April 1924; Paris, France
- Died: 15 December 2018 (aged 94); Sologne, France
- Occupation: Director

Guy Rétoré (7 April 1924 – 15 December 2018) was a French director.

== Biography ==
In 1951, Rétoré created la Guilde, a French amateur theatre company. He later moved downtown into the Patronage Saint Pierre. Rétoré would rename it Théâtre de Ménilmontant. He stayed there for three years. Rétoré got la Guilde recognized as a permanent troupe, and moved it into théâtre de l'Est parisien in 1963. He became the next leader of the theatre.

In July 2001, Rétoré retired as director of théâtre de l'Est parisien, although there was a controversy over his replacement. After Jean-Paul Devois was a placeholder, Catherine Anne became the next director of the theatre.

== Works ==
=== Theatre ===
- Coquin de coq by Sean O'Casey (1975)

=== Movies ===
- Section spéciale by Costa-Gavras

=== Television ===
- Mourir pour Copernic by Bernard Sobel
