= Marcel Bluwal =

French film director (1925–2021)

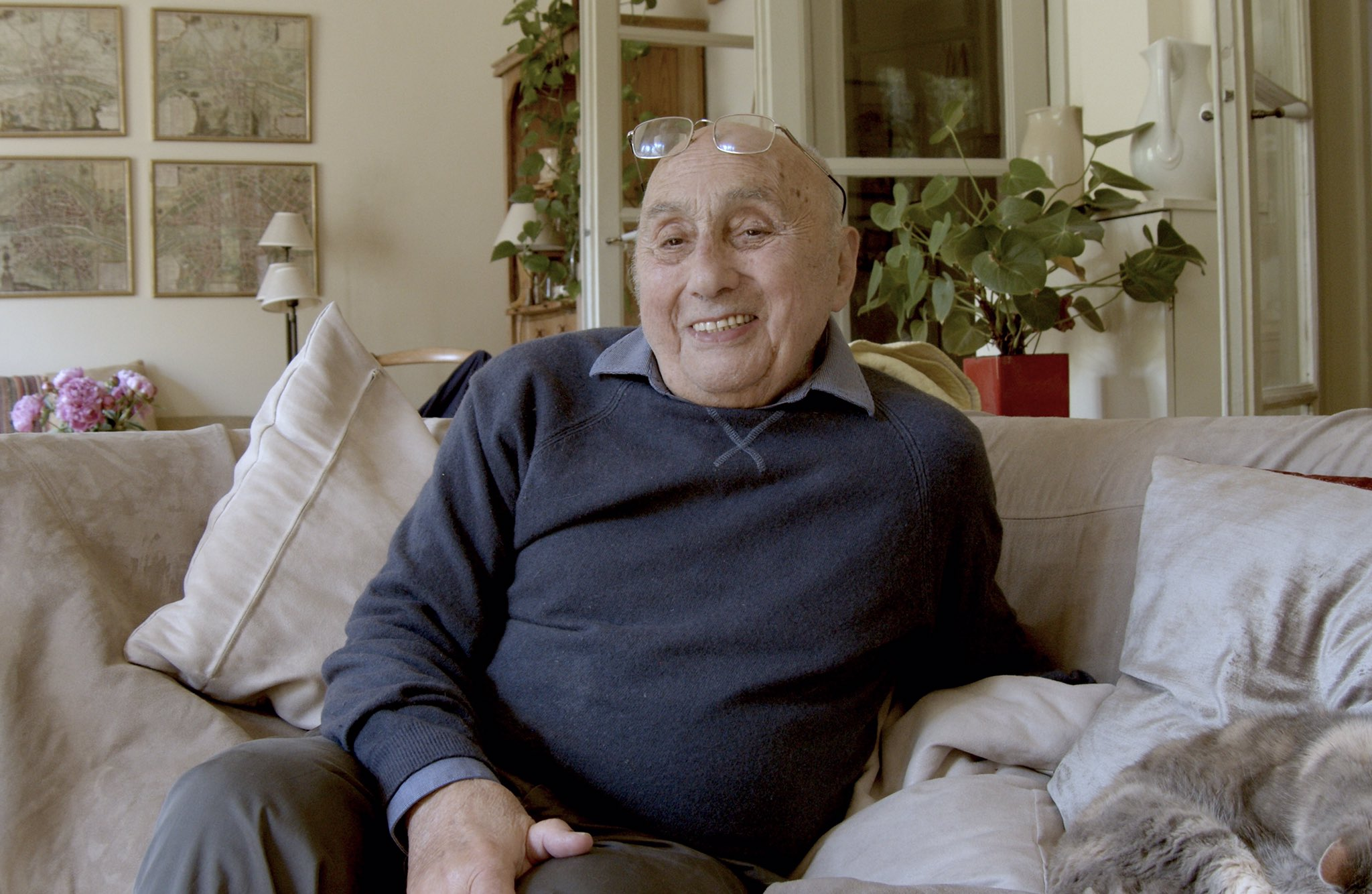
- Bluwal in 2020
- Born: 25 May 1925; Paris, France
- Died: 23 October 2021 (aged 96)
- Occupations: Film director Screenwriter
- Years active: 1955–2021

Marcel Bluwal (25 May 1925 – 23 October 2021) was a French film director and screenwriter who directed more than 40 films in his career.

== Selected filmography ==
=== Director ===
- Carom Shots (1963)
- The New Adventures of Vidocq (1971, TV series)
- Clérambard (1990)
- La Goutte'Or (1990), adaptation of the book The Golden Droplet
- À droite toute (2008)

=== Actor ===
- Sortie de secours (1970)
- Frantic (1988) - Man in Tweed
- L'argent fait le bonheur (1993) - M. Viali
- Le voyage en Arménie (2006) - Barsam (final film role)
