= Les Fausses Confidences =

LOVE

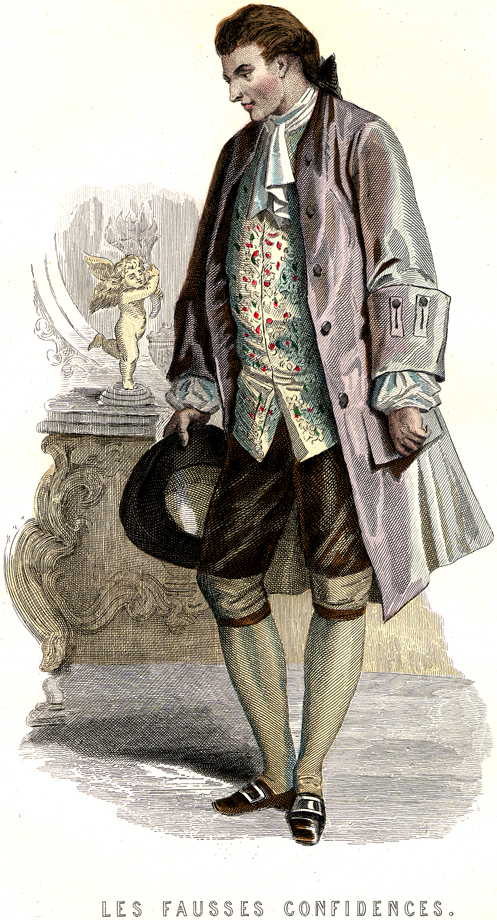
Marivaux: Les Fausses Confidences

Les Fausses Confidences is a three-act comedy in prose by the French playwright Pierre de Carlet de Chamberlain de Marivaux. It was first performed on the 16 March 1737 by the actors of the Comédie Italienne at the Hotel de Bourgogne, Paris.

This play explores the idea of deceiving someone in order to make them fall in love, a theme which has always been popular with playwrights and which had figured in several of Marivaux’s earlier plays. Despite its well-devised plot, likeable characters and interesting comic situations, this play did not at first receive the success it merited. However, when it was taken up again, this time by the Théâtre-Français in 1793, it received a much more favourable reception.

== Principal Characters ==
Araminte, a rich widow and daughter of Madame Argante

Dorante, nephew of Monsieur Rémy

Monsieur Rémy, lawyer and uncle of Dorante

Madame Argante, mother of Araminte

Arlequin, Araminte's valet (a comic character, who during the play is given the task of serving Dorante)

Dubois, Dorante's former valet, now in the service of Araminte

Marton, Araminte's servant and companion

Count Dorimont, Araminte's suitor

== Plot ==
=== Act 1 ===
Dorante, a young man of good family, finds himself financially ruined. His former valet, Dubois, is now in the service of an attractive young widow and, seeing that his former master is in love with her, plans a scheme to make her marry him. He tells Dorante to use his connection to Monsieur Rémy, (Dorante's uncle who is also Araminte's lawyer) to introduce himself into the house and take on the role of steward (intendant).

All the action is driven by Dubois, who sets in motion a foolproof strategy for making Araminte fall in love with Dorante.

From the start, Araminte is attracted by his distinguished air and agreeable manners, and so she hires him. She is involved in legal proceedings with Count Dorimont, who is keen to marry her in order to end the case, which he is worried about losing. She herself has no desire to marry the Count and asks Dorante to examine the documents to see if she has any chance of winning.

Monsieur Rémy decides that Dorante would do well to marry Marton, Araminte's companion and protégée. She would thereby receive 1000 livres, which the Count has promised her as a gift if he marries Araminte. Marton tries to show Dorante that this sum would be beneficial to both of them. Although this is not part of Dubois’ plot, it can only help his plan along since Marton’s interest in Dorante is likely to make Araminte jealous.

Meanwhile, Araminte's mother, who is an ambitious woman and dreams of seeing her daughter become a countess, orders Dorante to tell Araminte that she will lose her case, leaving her with no other choice but to marry the Count. However, Dorante refuses to take any part in this and Araminte, hearing what has happened, congratulates him on his integrity. Dubois interrupts this conversation and pretends to be surprised to see Dorante, while Dorante feigns embarrassment at being seen.

Left alone with Dubois, Araminte asks for some information about her new steward. He tells her that he is the most honest man in the world, well-educated, upright, and distinguished, but that he has one folly: he is in love. Several highly advantageous matches have been proposed to him, all of which he has refused because of this mad infatuation. When Araminte asks Dubois if he knows the person who has inspired such passion, he confides that it is she herself. She is astonished, but also deeply touched. Although she tells herself that she should not keep her steward now she is aware of his feelings for her, she cannot make up her mind to send him away immediately and decides to wait a little while.

=== Act II ===
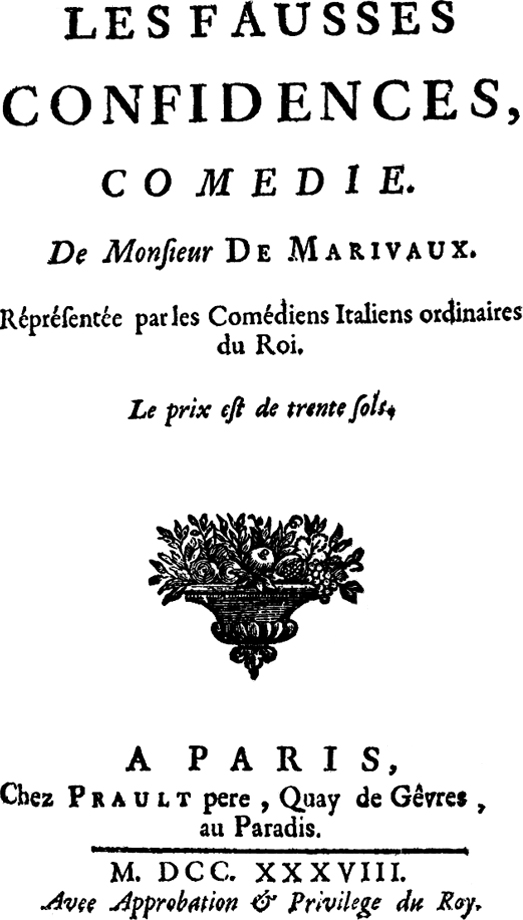
Les Fausses Confidences: Princeps Edition, dated 1738

Dorante advises Araminte to take the Count to court. Monsieur Rémy arrives to suggest a rich marriage for his nephew, and is irritated when he refuses. The unfortunate Marton believes that it is for her sake. At this point, a mysterious portrait is delivered to Araminte's house, and Marton is sure that she is the subject. However, when Araminte opens the box in the presence of her mother and the Count, they all discover that it is a portrait not of Marton but of her.

Araminte learns from Dubois that the idea of marrying Dorante to Marton has come from Monsieur Rémy, and that the portrait has indeed been painted by Dorante. Araminte therefore decides to set a trap for him.

She makes him write a letter to the Count, informing him that she accepts his proposal. Dorante is troubled and worried, but, suspecting a trap, reveals nothing of his own feelings. Marton arrives to announce that she is ready to marry him: he explains to Araminte that he cannot go through with this as he loves someone else. As he does not want to say who, she opens the box with the portrait, and he throws himself at her feet to ask for her forgiveness. Araminte pardons him, but afterwards tells Dubois that he has not declared himself.

=== Act III ===
Marton, having seen that Dorante has no interest in her, follows Dubois’ advice and steals a letter. This letter, which Dorante has written at Dubois’ own instigation, tells an imaginary recipient of his passion for Araminte and his desire to flee out of shame for having offended her.

Madame Argante tries one last time to persuade her daughter to send Dorante away and argues with Monsieur Rémy, who is furious that she is treating his amiable nephew as an impertinent upstart. Marton, who sees the letter as the ideal vengeance, makes the Count read it aloud in the presence of all the protagonists. Since this letter’s aim was to make Dorante's passion public, he does not deny it. Araminte is upset and sends everyone away.

She reproaches Dubois for having betrayed his former master and promises her friendship to Marton who comes to ask forgiveness. Having accepted Dorantes request that he might come and say goodbye to her, she ends up admitting that she loves him. He then confesses that most of what she has been told was false, and that Dubois arranged the whole scheme. The only things that are true are his love for her and the portrait which he painted.

She forgives him for everything because of his love and his frankness. The Count, who has realised she loves Dorante, retires with dignity. Madame Argante vows that she will never consider him her son-in-law, but Araminte cares nothing for this. The play ends with Dubois congratulating himself on his victory.

== Adaptations ==
In 2016 Luc Bondy filmed an adaptation of the play co-directed with Marie-Louise Bischofberger. The film starred Louis Garrel and Isabelle Huppert and was set in modern-day France. It was released in the U.S. with the title False Confessions.

== See also ==
- 18th-century French literature
