= Michel Fagadau =

French theater director and producer

Michel Fagadau (born Mihai Făgădău, 1930– February 10, 2011) was a Romanian-born French theater director and producer.

Born in Bucharest, his family had to leave Romania during the war due to his father's antifascist activities. They ended up in the Orient, where they stayed for two years, and where he started to learn English. After the war they settled in France. He took his Baccalauréat degree there, and then went to London to study acting at the Royal Academy of Dramatic Arts. After only six months in London, he was hired by the Royal Shakespeare Company, studying in parallel at the Royal Academy of Dramatic Arts. When he graduated in 1957, he continued to work for the Royal Shakespeare Company. It was the same company where directed his first play, Voulez-vous jouer avec moâ by Marcel Achard.

In 1960, he was entrusted with the leadership of the "Théâtre de la Gaîté Montparnasse" in Paris, a post he held until 1990. In 1994, he became artistic director of the Comédie des Champs-Élysées and Studio des Champs-Élysées.

An admirer of Montgomery Clift and Elia Kazan, he died in Paris on February 10, 2011.
