= Conservatoire national supérieur d'art dramatique =

French national drama academy in Paris

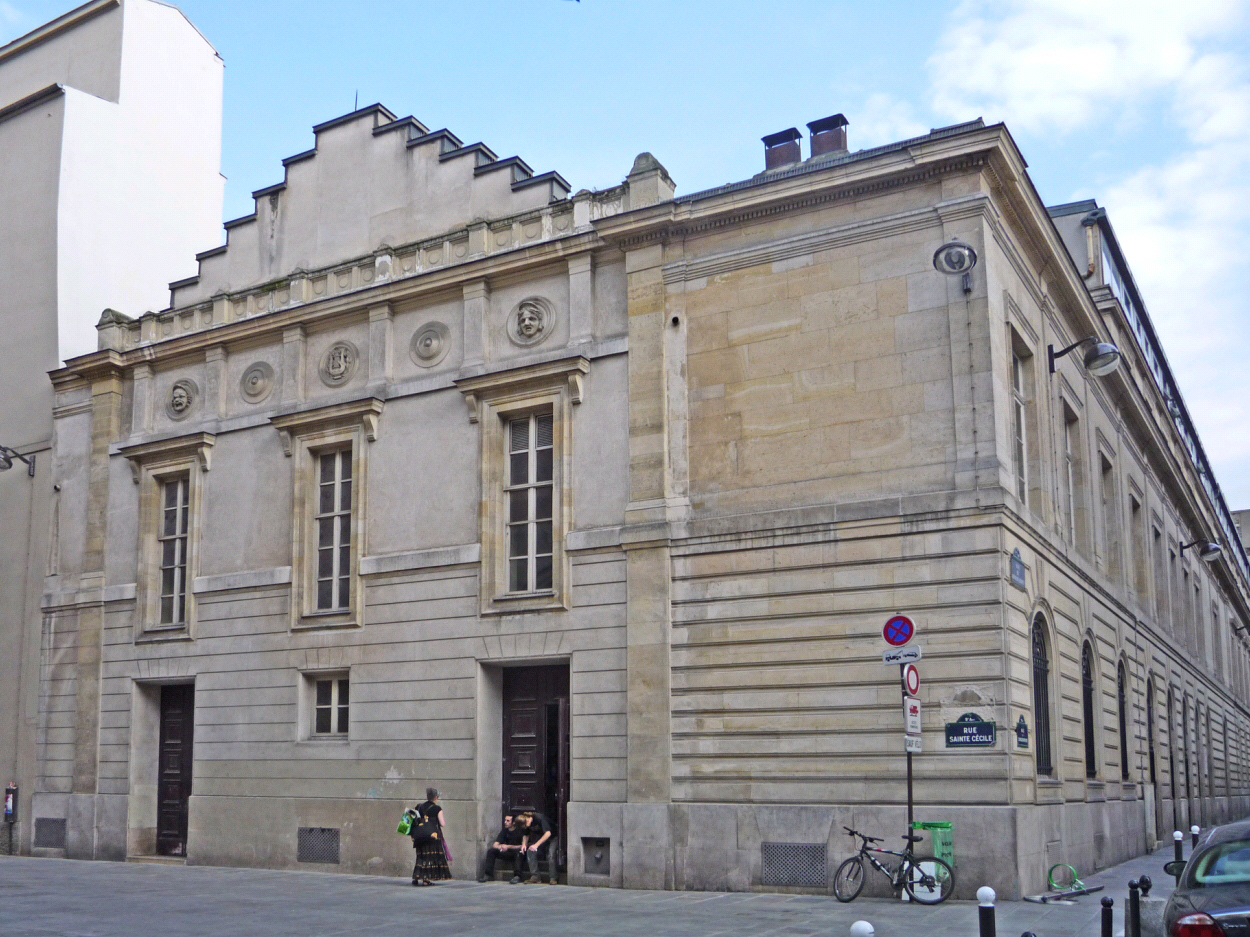
- CNSAD's main building in Paris
- Type: Grande école
- Established: 19 July 1784; 242 years ago (as a part of the Conservatoire de Paris); 1946 (as the CNSAD)
- Affiliations: PSL Research University
- Administrator: French Ministry of Culture
- Location: 2 bis rue du Conservatoire, Paris, Île-de-France, 75009, France; 48.8723°N 2.3468°E
- Campus: Urban
- Website: cnsad.psl.eu

The Conservatoire national supérieur d'art dramatique (French pronunciation: [kɔ̃sɛʁvatwaʁ nɑsjɔnal sypeʁjœʁ daʁ dʁamatik]; National Academy of Dramatic Arts; abbr. CNSAD) is France's national drama academy, located in Paris and a constituent college of Paris Sciences et Lettres University.

It is a higher education institution run by the French Ministry of Culture and has an acceptance rate of two to three percent and an average graduating class of thirty students. Its alumni include: Jeanne Moreau, Gérard Philipe, Isabelle Huppert, Carole Bouquet, Sebastian Roché, Jean-Paul Belmondo, Louis Garrel, Celine Sallette and Olivier Martinez.

== History ==
The CNSAD was founded as a part of the Conservatoire de Paris in 1795, making it the oldest acting school in Continental Europe. The Conservatoire de Paris split in 1946, with one school for the dramatic arts, and the other for music and dance, the Conservatoire National Supérieur de Musique et de Danse de Paris (CNSMDP).

== Admissions ==
The CNSAD offers a degree, three-year study program, with the CNSAD diploma awarded on completion. The school admits approximately thirty students per year (usually fifteen men and fifteen women), as well as some invited foreign trainees (stagiaires étrangers). The school has a rigorous three-round competitive selection process, with only two percent to three percent of applicants gaining admittance. A stage-directing program was launched in 2001.

== Location ==
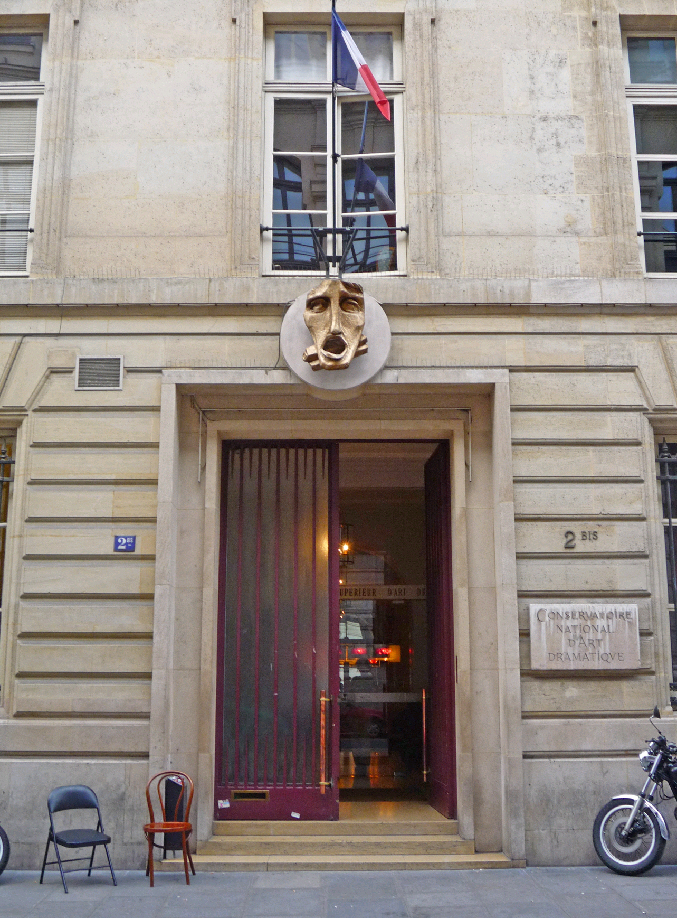
Entrance to the CNSAD (May 2009)

The school's main building, is located on the rue du Conservatoire in the 9th arrondissement of Paris. Its famous theatre, built in 1811 by the architect Delannoy, was the site of Hector Berlioz's debut symphony, the Symphonie fantastique, as well as the first French performances of Beethoven's Third and Fifth Symphonies.
