= Béatrice Agenin =

French actress and stage director

- Born: 30 July 1950 (age 76); Paris, France
- Occupations: Actor, comedian, film director
- Years active: 1972–present

Béatrice Agenin (French pronunciation: [beatʁis aʒnɛ̃]; born 30 July 1950 in Paris) is a French stage, film, television actress and director.

== Career ==
Agenin received the second prize of French National Academy of Dramatic Arts in 1974 and was hired at the Comédie-Française the same year. In 1979, she was named Sociétaire in 1979. She left the Troupe in 1984.

After seven nominations for the Molière Award, she finally won in 2020 for the play Marie des Poules.

== Theater ==
Year	Title	Author	Director	Notes
1972–73	The Miser	Molière	René Jauneau	
1973	La Reine de Césarée	Robert Brasillach	Jean-Laurent Cochet	
1974	The Weaker Sex	Édouard Bourdet	Jean-Laurent Cochet	
1974	La Nostalgie, Camarade	François Billetdoux	Jean-Paul Roussillon	
1974	The House of Bernarda Alba	Federico García Lorca	Robert Hossein	
1975	L'Île de la raison	Pierre de Marivaux	Jean-Louis Thamin	
1975	La Surprise de l'amour	Pierre de Marivaux	Simon Eine	
1975–77	The Miser	Molière	Jean-Paul Roussillon	
1976	Dom Juan	Molière	Antoine Bourseiller	
1976	Cyrano de Bergerac	Edmond Rostand	Jean-Paul Roussillon	
1976	The Game of Love and Chance	Pierre de Marivaux	Jean-Paul Roussillon	
1977	Le Cid	Pierre Corneille	Terry Hands	
1977	Ami, entends-tu ?	Alain Pralon	Jacques Destoop	
1977–78	On ne badine pas avec l'amour	Alfred de Musset	Simon Eine	
1977–79	The Misanthrope	Molière	Pierre Dux	
1978	Un caprice	Alfred de Musset	Michel Etcheverry	
1979	Le Mal du siècle	Baudelaire, de Musset, ...	Denise Gence	
1979–80	The Miser	Molière	Jean-Paul Roussillon	
1980	Dom Juan	Molière	Roger Planchon	
1980	The Game of Love and Chance	Pierre de Marivaux	Jean-Paul Roussillon	
1981	Andromaque	Jean Racine	Patrice Kerbrat	
1981–82	The Mistress of the Inn	Carlo Goldoni	Jacques Lassalle	
1982	Life Is a Dream	Pedro Calderón de la Barca	Jorge Lavelli	
1983	The Miser	Molière	Jean-Paul Roussillon	
1986	La Répétition ou l'Amour puni	Jean Anouilh	Bernard Murat	
1987–88	Kean	Alexandre Dumas	Robert Hossein	
1988	La Reine morte	Henry de Montherlant	Jean-Laurent Cochet	
1988	Une femme sans histoire	A. R. Gurney	Bernard Murat	Nominated - Molière Award for Best Supporting Actress
1989–91	Cyrano de Bergerac	Edmond Rostand	Robert Hossein	
1990	Une femme sans histoire	A. R. Gurney	Bernard Murat	
1992–93	Making it Better	James Saunders	Stéphan Meldegg	Nominated - Molière Award for Best Actress
1993	Tailleur pour dames	Georges Feydeau	Bernard Murat	
1995	Independence	Lee Blessing	Béatrice Agenin	
1997	A Flea in Her Ear	Georges Feydeau	Bernard Murat	
1997	Who's Afraid of Virginia Woolf?	Edward Albee	Pierre Constant	Nominated - Molière Award for Best Actress
1998	Independence	Lee Blessing	Béatrice Agenin	
2000	Les Femmes Savantes	Molière	Béatrice Agenin	
2000–01	Le Malin Plaisir	David Hare	Jacques Lassalle	
2003	Les Sincères & L'Épreuve	Pierre de Marivaux	Béatrice Agenin	
2005	Barefoot in the Park	Neil Simon	Steve Suissa	Nominated - Molière Award for Best Supporting Actress
2006–07	Going To St. Ives	Lee Blessing	Béatrice Agenin	
2008–09	On Golden Pond	Ernest Thompson	Stéphane Hillel	
2009–10	Le Diable rouge	Antoine Rault	Christophe Lidon	
2010	Z'ombres	Isabelle Pirot	Yves Pignot	
2010–12	Henri IV, le bien aimé	Daniel Colas	Daniel Colas	
2014	Sugar Lake	Lee Blessing	Béatrice Agenin	
2014	Cabaret Barbara	Barbara	Béatrice Agenin	
2014	Le Jardinier de la mer rouge	Gérald Duchemin & Rémy Jousse	Bruno Bernardin	
2014	Le Plaisir de rompre Le Pain de ménage	Jules Renard	Pierre Laville	
2015–17	Un certain Charles Spencer Chaplin	Daniel Colas	Daniel Colas	Nominated - Molière Award for Best Supporting Actress
2016–17	La Louve	Daniel Colas	Daniel Colas	Nominated - Molière Award for Best Actress
2018–20	Suite française	Irène Némirovsky	Virginie Lemoine	
2019–23	Marie des Poules	Gérard Savoisien	Arnaud Denis	Molière Award for Best Actress
2022–23	Notre Petit Cabaret	Béatrice Agenin & Émilie Bouchereau	Béatrice Agenin & Émilie Bouchereau	

== Filmography ==
Year	Title	Role	Director	Notes
1976	Le Plein de Super	Agathe	Alain Cavalier	
1978	Ce diable d'homme	Beautiful and Good	Marcel Camus	TV mini-series
1978	Claudine	Annie Valdès	Édouard Molinaro	TV series (1 episode)
1979	Mort d'un prof	Anne-Marie Jouan	Georges Régnier	TV movie
1979	Le journal	Françoise Grimaldi	Philippe Lefebvre	TV mini-series
1979	Le roi qui vient du sud	Duchess of Montpensier	Marcel Camus & Heinz Schirk	TV mini-series
1980	L'été indien	Michèle	Jean Delannoy	TV movie
1981	Au bon beurre	Madeleine Lécuyer	Édouard Molinaro	TV series (2 episodes)
1982	L'enlèvement de Ben Bella	The stewardess	Pierre Lefranc	TV movie
1982	Commissaire Moulin	Camille Chartier	Claude Boissol	TV series (1 episode)
1983	L'ami de Vincent	Léa	Pierre Granier-Deferre	
1983	Pauvre Eros	Laurence	Georges Régnier	TV movie
1983	La veuve rouge	Charlotte	Édouard Molinaro	TV movie
1983	Quelques hommes de bonne volonté	Marie de Champçenais	François Villiers	TV mini-series
1983	Les brigades du Tigre	Rita	Victor Vicas	TV series (1 episode)
1983	Le fou du désert	Béatrice	Jacques Tréfouel	TV series (4 episodes)
1984	La 7ème cible	Catherine	Claude Pinoteau	
1984	Year of the Jellyfish	Marianne Lamotte	Christopher Frank	
1984	Le tueur triste	Juliette	Nicolas Gessner	TV movie
1984	La bavure	Liz	Nicolas Ribowski	TV mini-series
1985	Sadness and Beauty	Agatha	Joy Fleury	
1986	The Woman of My Life	Marion	Régis Wargnier	
1986	Pepe Carvalho	Dora Centurión	Adolfo Aristarain	TV series (1 episode)
1986	L'ami Maupassant	Emilie	Claude Santelli	TV series (1 episode)
1987	L'heure Simenon	Marthe	Édouard Niermans	TV series (1 episode)
1988	Itinerary of a Spoiled Child	Corinne	Claude Lelouch	
1989	Champagne Charlie	Madame de Ghuilain	Allan Eastman	TV movie
1990	L'ami Giono	Annette de Jutras	Marcel Bluwal	TV mini-series
1990	Imogène	Marylin Menez	Sylvain Madigan	TV series (1 episode)
1990	Haute tension	Chantal	Joyce Buñuel	TV series (1 episode)
1991	La neige et le feu	Madame Sénéchal	Claude Pinoteau	
1991	Renseignements généraux	Marie-Christine	Philippe Lefebvre	TV series (1 episode)
1991	Napoleon	Joséphine de Beauharnais	Pierre Lary & Krzysztof Zanussi	TV series (2 episodes)
1992	La femme abandonnée	Louise de Nueil	Édouard Molinaro	TV movie
1994	L'irrésolu	Marie-France	Jean-Pierre Ronssin	
1994	Le trajet de la foudre	Hélène	Jacques Bourton	TV movie
1994	Maigret	Arlette	David Delrieux	TV series (1 episode)
1994	Navarro	Laura Belmont	Nicolas Ribowski	TV series (1 episode)
1996	Hercule et Sherlock	Nicole Morand	Jeannot Szwarc	
1996	Fantôme avec chauffeur	Hélène	Gérard Oury	
1996	Le juge est une femme	Chantal Lesueur	Pierre Boutron	TV series (1 episode)
1996–2016	Une famille formidable	Reine Grenier	Joël Santoni & Alexandre Pidoux	TV series (36 episodes)
1997	Salut l'angoisse	Hélène	Maurice Frydland	TV movie
1997	Belle comme Crésus	Constance	Jean-François Villemer	TV movie
1997–1999	Vérité oblige	Marion Delcroix	Claude-Michel Rome	TV series (2 episodes)
1999	The Escort	Catherine	Michel Blanc	
1999	Nora	The Judge	Édouard Molinaro	TV movie
1999	Justice	Florence	Gérard Marx	TV series (1 episode)
2000	Amélia	Sarah Bernhardt	Ana Carolina	Biarritz Film Festival - Best Actress
2001	Alias Betty	Alex's mistress	Claude Miller	
2002	Mademoiselle Else	Mother Braun	Pierre Boutron	TV movie
2002	Un week-end pour le dire	Marie	Jean-Pierre Vergne	TV movie
2002	Navarro	Madame Dejoncourt	Gérard Marx	TV series (1 episode)
2002	Josephine, Guardian Angel	Christine Leroy	Laurent Dussaux	TV series (1 episode)
2003	Michel Vaillant	Élisabeth Vaillant	Louis-Pascal Couvelaire	
2003	Satan refuse du monde	Liliane de Vidal	Jacques Renard	TV movie
2003	La crim'	Ariane Fargeau	Jean-Pierre Prévost	TV series (1 episode)
2003–05	Avocats & associés	Dorine Ruben-Ravel	Patrice Martineau, Olivier Barma, ...	TV series (12 episodes)
2004	Mariage mixte	Anne-Marie Dupreux	Alexandre Arcady	
2005	Cavalcade	Badette	Steve Suissa	
2005	Prune Becker	Prune Becker	Alexandre Pidoux	TV movie
2005	L'enfant de personne	Fanny DiVitto	Michaël Perrotta	TV movie
2005	Navarro	Sabina	Édouard Molinaro	TV series (1 episode)
2006	Qui a dit fontaine, je ne boirai pas de ton eau	Suzanne	Jean-François Le Moing	Short
2006	Le porte-bonheur	Gabriella	Laurent Dussaux	TV movie
2006	Jeff et Léo, flics et jumeaux		Olivier Guignard	TV series (1 episode)
2007	Petit poucet		Matthieu Rozé	Short
2007	Agathe contre Agathe	Élisabeth Verdier	Thierry Binisti	TV movie
2007	Commissaire Cordier	Maria Grigorescu	Henri Helman	TV series (1 episode)
2008	À droite toute	Simone Salmon	Marcel Bluwal	TV mini-series
2009	Tomorrow at Dawn	The Duchess	Denis Dercourt	
2009	La cour des grands	Mathilde Valmaure	Christophe Barraud	TV series (4 episodes)
2013	Le bonheur sinon rien!	Jeanne Valentin	Régis Musset	TV movie
2015	50 l'amour		Xavier Douin	Short
2015–2019	Cassandre	Évelyne Roche	Hervé Renoh, Sylvie Ayme, ...	TV series (13 episodes)
2016	Nina	Guislaine Brunel	Adeline Darraux	TV series (1 episode)
2016	L'accident	Florence	Edwin Baily	TV series (2 episodes)
2016	Blaise	Grandma	Jean-Paul Guigue & Camillelvis Théry	TV series (8 episodes)
2019	Rebels	Sandra's mother	Allan Mauduit	
2022	Capitaine Marleau	Claire Cellier	Josée Dayan	TV series (1 episode)

== Dubbing ==
Year	Title	Role	Actress
1981	The Salamander	Lili Anders	Sybil Danning
1982	Tron	Dr. Laura Baines / Yori	Cindy Morgan
1985	Into the Night	Diana	Michelle Pfeiffer
1986	Peggy Sue Got Married	Carol Heath	Catherine Hicks
1986	Down and Out in Beverly Hills	Jenny Whiteman	Tracy Nelson
1987	Suspect	Kathleen Riley	Cher
1987	Blind Date	Nadia Gates	Kim Basinger
1987	Harry and the Hendersons	Nancy Henderson	Melinda Dillon
1988	The Kiss	Felice Dunbar	Joanna Pacuła
1988	Vice Versa	Sam	Corinne Bohrer
1988	Working Girl	Tess McGill	Melanie Griffith
1990	The Two Jakes	Lillian Bodine	Madeleine Stowe
1991	Barton Fink	Audrey Taylor	Judy Davis
1991	Diary of a Hitman	Kiki	Sharon Stone
1991	Scenes from a Mall	Deborah Fifer	Bette Midler
1992	Damage	Ingrid Fleming	Miranda Richardson
1992	Cool World	Holli Would	Kim Basinger
1992	Unlawful Entry	Karen Carr	Madeleine Stowe
1992	The Hand That Rocks the Cradle	Peyton Flanders	Rebecca De Mornay
1993	Sliver	Carly Norris	Sharon Stone
1993	Short Cuts	Claire Kane	Anne Archer
1993	Blind Side	Lynn Kaines	Rebecca De Mornay
1993	The Joy Luck Club	Rose Hsu Jordan	Rosalind Chao
1993	The Remains of the Day	Miss Kenton	Emma Thompson
1994	Bad Girls	Cody Zamora	Madeleine Stowe
1994	Nobody's Fool	Toby Roebuck	Melanie Griffith
1995	Casino	Ginger McKenna	Sharon Stone
1995	Never Talk to Strangers	Dr. Sarah Taylor	Rebecca De Mornay
1996	Crash	Helen Remington	Holly Hunter
1998	Celebrity	Nicole Oliver	Melanie Griffith
1999	Sleepy Hollow	Lady Mary Van Tassel	Miranda Richardson
1999	Tea with Mussolini	Elsa Strauss	Cher
2000	Chicken Run	Mrs. Tweedy	Miranda Richardson
2001	Blow Dry	Shelley Allen	Natasha Richardson
2002	The Hours	Clarissa Vaughan	Meryl Streep
2013	Last Vegas	Diana	Mary Steenburgen
2020	The One and Only Ivan	Snickers	Helen Mirren
