= Loïc Corbery =

French actor and theatre director (born 1976)

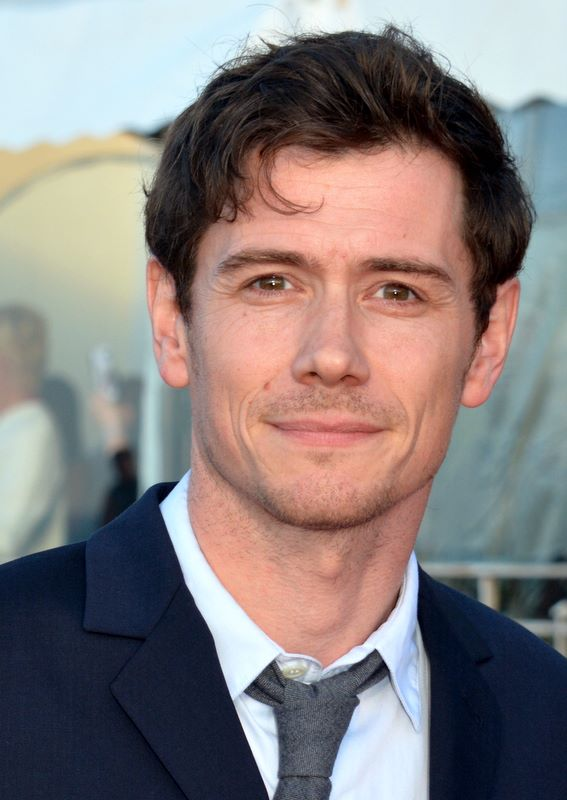
- Loïc Corbery at the 2016 Cabourg Film Festival
- Born: 9 June 1976 (age 49); Avignon, France
- Occupations: Actor, theatre director
- Years active: 1995-present
- Website: www.loiccorbery.com

Loïc Corbery (born 9 June 1976) is a French actor and theatre director. He joined the Comédie-Française in 2005 and has been a sociétaire since 2010.

== Theater ==
Year	Title	Author	Director
1996	L'Assemblée des femmes	Aristophanes	Jean-Luc Tardieu
1996-97	Les Œufs de l’autruche	André Roussin	Stéphane Hillel
1997	The Game of Love and Chance	Pierre de Marivaux	Jean-Pierre André
1999	The Misanthrope	Molière	Loïc Corbery
2000	Life of Galileo	Bertolt Brecht	Jacques Lassalle
2000	La scuola di ballo	Carlo Goldoni	Jacques Lassalle
2001	Cyrano de Bergerac	Edmond Rostand	Jacques Weber
2002	Nothing Hurts	Falk Richter	Michèle Fouchet
2002	En délicatesse	Christophe Pellet	Jean-Pierre Miquel
2003-04	Le Jour du destin	Michel del Castillo	Jean-Marie Besset & Gilbert Désveaux
2004-05	Antony and Cleopatra	William Shakespeare	Stuart Seide
2005	L'Amour médecin	Molière	Jonathan Duverger & Jean-Marie Villégier
2005	La Fontaine's Fables	Jean de La Fontaine	Robert Wilson
2005	The Imaginary Invalid	Molière	Claude Stratz
2005-06	Le Cid	Pierre Corneille	Brigitte Jaques-Wajeman
2006	The Liar	Pierre Corneille	Jean-Louis Benoît
2006	Loin de Corpus Christi	Christophe Pellet	Jacques Lassalle
2006-07	Il campiello	Carlo Goldoni	Jacques Lassalle
2007	On the High Road	Anton Chekhov	Guillaume Gallienne
2007-08	The Misanthrope	Molière	Lukas Hemleb
2007-08	The Imaginary Invalid	Molière	Claude Stratz
2007-08	The Taming of the Shrew	William Shakespeare	Oskaras Koršunovas
2008	Douce vengeance	Hanoch Levin	Galin Stoev
2008	Sacré nom de dieu	Arnaud Bédouet	Loïc Corbery
2008	Cyrano de Bergerac	Edmond Rostand	Denis Podalydès
2008-10	L'Illusion Comique	Pierre Corneille	Galin Stoev
2008-10	Figaro Gets a Divorce	Ödön von Horváth	Jacques Lassalle
2009-10	La grande magia	Eduardo De Filippo	Dan Jemmett
2009-11	The Miser	Molière	Catherine Hiegel
2009-11	The Merry Wives of Windsor	William Shakespeare	Andrés Lima
2010	The Birds	Aristophanes	Alfredo Arias
2010	Cyrano de Bergerac	Edmond Rostand	Denis Podalydès
2011	Le Babil des classes dangereuses	Valère Novarina	Denis Podalydès
2011-12	The Imaginary Invalid	Molière	Claude Stratz
2011-12	On ne badine pas avec l’amour	Alfred de Musset	Yves Beaunesne
2011-12	La Critique de l’École des femmes	Molière	Clément Hervieu-Léger
2012	Cyrano de Bergerac	Edmond Rostand	Denis Podalydès
2012	Une histoire de la Comédie-Française	Christophe Barbier	Muriel Mayette-Holtz
2012-14	Dom Juan	Molière	Jean-Pierre Vincent
2012-14	L'Épreuve	Pierre de Marivaux	Clément Hervieu-Léger
2013	The Miser	Molière	Catherine Hiegel
2013	Troilus and Cressida	William Shakespeare	Jean-Yves Ruf
2014-17	The Misanthrope	Molière	Clément Hervieu-Léger
2014-17	La Double Inconstancy	Pierre de Marivaux	Anne Kessler
2015	Summerfolk	Maxim Gorky	Gérard Desarthe
2015-17	Cyrano de Bergerac	Edmond Rostand	Denis Podalydès
2016-17	Les Damnés	Luchino Visconti	Ivo van Hove
2016-18	Le Petit-Maître corrigé	Pierre de Marivaux	Clément Hervieu-Léger
2017-18	The Tempest	William Shakespeare	Robert Carsen
2017-19	Le Pays lointain	Jean-Luc Lagarce	Clément Hervieu-Léger
2018	Goethe's Faust	Johann Wolfgang von Goethe	Valentine Losseau & Raphaël Navarro
2018	L’Heureux Stratagème	Pierre de Marivaux	Emmanuel Daumas
2018	Avant l’heure où les thés d’après-midi finissaient...	Louise Weiss, Marcel Proust, ...	Floriane Bonanni
2019	Les Damnés	Luchino Visconti	Ivo van Hove
2019	The Misanthrope	Molière	Clément Hervieu-Léger
2019-20	Singulis (Hamlet)	William Shakespeare	Loïc Corbery
2019-20	Life of Galileo	Bertolt Brecht	Éric Ruf
2019-20	Electra / Orestes	Euripides	Ivo van Hove
2020	Le Côté de Guermantes	Marcel Proust	Christophe Honoré
2021	Blasted	Sarah Kane	Simon Delétang
2021	Mais quelle Comédie !	Marina Hands & Serge Bagdassarian	Marina Hands & Serge Bagdassarian
2021-23	The Cherry Orchard	Anton Chekhov	Clément Hervieu-Léger
2022	Hamlet	William Shakespeare	Simon Delétang
2022	Pas de côté	Pascal Sangla	Pascal Sangla
2022	Life of Galileo	Bertolt Brecht	Éric Ruf
2022	Hamletmachine	Heiner Müller	Simon Delétang
2022	Singulis (Hamlet)	William Shakespeare	Loïc Corbery
2022-23	Tartuffe	Molière	Ivo van Hove
2022-24	The Misanthrope	Molière	Clément Hervieu-Léger
2023	Danton's Death	Georg Büchner	Simon Delétang
2023	Le Côté de Guermantes	Marcel Proust	Christophe Honoré
2024-25	Hecuba	Euripides	Tiago Rodrigues
2025	The Seagull	Anton Chekhov	Elsa Granat
2025	The Cherry Orchard	Anton Chekhov	Clément Hervieu-Léger

== Filmography ==
=== Television ===
Year	Title	Role	Director	Notes
1995	Julie Lescaut	Arnaud	Alain Bonnot	TV series (1 episode)
1997	Les arnaqueuses	Nino	Thierry Binisti	TV movie
1998	La justice de Marion	Luc	Thierry Binisti	TV movie
1999	La route à l'envers	Benedict	Chantal Picault	TV movie
1999	La kiné	Bruno Peilleix	Aline Issermann	TV series (1 episode)
1999	Louis la brocante	Xavier	Maurice Frydland	TV series (1 episode)
1999-2002	Brigade spéciale	Stan	Charlotte Brändström & Pascale Dallet	TV series (4 episodes)
2000	Un et un font six	Grégoire	Jean-Pierre Vergne	TV series (2 episodes)
2001	Permission moisson	Jean Pittas	Didier Grousset	TV movie
2004	Les passeurs	Guy	Didier Grousset	TV movie
2004	Sœur Thérèse.com	Lionel Mestayer	Didier Grousset	TV series (1 episode)
2004-06	Commissaire Valence	Stéphane Carrère	Patrick Grandperret, Vincenzo Marano, ...	TV series (6 episodes)
2005	Si j'avais des millions	Mathieu Legrand	Gérard Marx	TV series (1 episode)
2006	Fête de famille	Newton	Lorenzo Gabriele	TV mini-series
2008	À droite toute	Adrien Gérard	Marcel Bluwal	TV mini-series
2009	Ah, c'était ça la vie!	Jean-Jacques de Reuilly-Nonancourt	Franck Apprederis	TV mini-series
2011	Jeanne Devère	Marc Hétier / Doctor Legros	Marcel Bluwal	TV movie
2011	Le vernis craque	Armand	Daniel Janneau	TV movie
2011	Le temps du silence	Manuel	Franck Apprederis	TV movie
2011	Quand la guerre sera loin	Louis Midavaine	Olivier Schatzky	TV movie
2014	La forêt	Alexei	Arnaud Desplechin	TV movie
2016	Dom Juan & Sganarelle	Dom Juan	Vincent Macaigne	TV movie
2019	Un homme parfait	Maxime	Didier Bivel	TV movie
2022	3615 Monique	Marc Dorcel	Guillaume Renusson	TV series (1 episode)
2022	L'Opéra	Alex Anderson	Stéphane Demoustier, Jean-Baptiste Pouilloux, ...	TV series (8 episodes)
2023	Icon of French Cinema	Éric	Judith Godrèche	TV mini-series

=== Cinema ===
Year	Title	Role	Notes	
1997	Marthe	Pierrot	Jean-Loup Hubert	
1998	Terminale	François	Francis Girod	
1999	Du bleu jusqu'en Amérique	Hadrien	Sarah Lévy	
2004	Les amateurs	Richard	Martin Valente	
2004	Fausse teinte	Etienne	Marie Guiraud	Short
2007	Fragile(s)	Mika Léoni	Martin Valente	
2008	A Day at the Museum	Luc	Jean-Michel Ribes	
2009	Bretelles, pudding et herbes hautes		Simon Lahmani	Short
2011	Bartleby	Bartleby	Olivier Martinez	Short
2014	À coup sûr	Tom Lesage	Delphine de Vigan	
2014	Not My Type	Clément Le Guern	Lucas Belvaux	
2015	La nuit, tous les chats sont roses	Lola	Guillaume Renusson	Short
2016	Sur quel pied danser	Xavier Laurent	Paul Calori & Kostia Testut	
2018	Submergence	Étienne	Wim Wenders	
2021	Guermantes	Loïc	Christophe Honoré	
2022	L'enfant	Jacques	Marguerite de Hillerin & Félix Dutilloy-Liégeois	
2023	White Paradise	The second cop	Guillaume Renusson	
2023	Surfaces	Basil	François Larpin	Short
2026	De Gaulle : Tilting Iron	René Pleven	Antonin Baudry	Part 1

== Awards and nominations ==
Year	Award	Nominated work	Result
2004	Molière Award for Best Male Newcomer	Le Jour du destin	Nominated
2014	Cabourg Film Festival for Best Actor	Not My Type	Won
