= L'Île =

L'Île may refer to:

== Places ==
=== Canada ===
- L'Île-Bizard, Quebec, a former municipality located on Île Bizard
- L'Île-Bizard–Sainte-Geneviève, a borough of the city of Montreal
- L'Île-Cadieux, a village and municipality in the Montérégie region of Quebec
- L'Île-d'Anticosti, Quebec, a municipality located on the Anticosti Island, Quebec
- L'Île-de-la-Visitation Nature Park, a large nature park in Montreal, Quebec
- L'Île-d'Orléans Regional County Municipality, a regional county municipality in Quebec
- L'Île-Dorval, a city in southwestern Quebec
- L'Île-du-Grand-Calumet, municipality in the Outaoutais region in Quebec
- L'Île (Laurentides), a peninsula extending in the Ottawa River, part of the municipality of Grenville-sur-la-Rouge, Quebec
- L'Île-Perrot, a town and municipality on Île Perrot, in southwestern Quebec

=== France ===
- L'Île-Bouchard, a commune in the Indre-et-Loire department, central France
- L'Île-d'Elle, a commune in the Vendée department, western France
- L'Île D'Oléron, an administrative division of Oleron Island
- L'Île-d'Olonne, a commune in the Vendée department
- L'Île-Rousse, a commune in the Haute-Corse department, on the island of Corsica
- L'Île-Saint-Denis, a commune in northern Paris

=== Saint Brandon, Mauritius ===
- L'Île Coco, one of the longest islands adjoining the inner lagoon of the St. Brandon archipelago
- L'île du Gouvernement, an uninhabited island used as a bird and turtle sanctuary
- L'île du Sud, also called South Island and l'île Boisées

== Arts and entertainment ==
- L'Île aux enfants, a French children's television show that was broadcast from 1975 to 1982
- L'Île de la raison, a social comedy by French playwright Pierre de Marivaux
- L'île de Merlin, ou Le monde renversé, an Opéra comique in one act composed by Christoph Willibald Gluck
- L'Île de Sept Villes, the third album by the Toronto-based instrumental band The Hylozoists
- L'île de Tulipatan, an Opéra bouffe (a form of operetta) in one act by Jacques Offenbach
- L'Île des esclaves, a one-act comedy made by French playwright Pierre de Marivaux
- L'Île des vérités, a French reality television series broadcast on French music
- L'île du rêve, a 1898 French opera set in Polynesia
- L'Île Enchantée, an 1864 ballet by Arthur Sullivan
