= Mahomet second =

Play by Pierre de Marivaux

Mahomet second is an unfinished tragedy in one act and five scenes in prose, written by French playwright Pierre de Marivaux circa 1733 and first published in the journal Mercure de France in 1747.

== Origin ==
Marivaux used to attend the Marquise de Lambert's literary salon with Antoine Houdar de La Motte, another supporter of prose in tragedy. After a talk about versification, he decided to answer empirically by writing Mahomet second, despite the failure a decade before of his Annibal. No-one managed to convince him to complete this tragedy whose topic had already been used by Vivien de Châteaubrun in a play which was performed eleven times at the Comédie-Française in 1714.

== Characters ==
- Ibrahim
- Irène
- Mahomet
- Roxane
- Théodore, Irène's father
- Lascaris, her brother

== Plot ==
Ibrahim, a prince from the Komnenoi dynasty allied to the Greek imperial family and converted to Islam after being kidnapped by the Turks, becomes a favourite of Mahomet second. The sultan sent him to fellow prisoner Greek princess Irène to tell her that her father and brother are alive, and that he intends on marrying her. She refuses the sultan's offer and despises Ibrahim for submitting himself to the Turks. Mahomet, who wanted to marry his sister to Ibrahim, then decides to wed her to Lascaris, and expects Irène to be grateful and accept to marry him. He frees Théodore and Lascaris in front of Irène, and the act ends with Roxane and Lascaris professing love for each other.

== Bibliography ==
- (in French) Frédéric Deloffre, "Ensembles associatifs et critique d’attribution : une application au cas de Marivaux", Études de langue et de littérature françaises offertes à André Lanly, pp. 451–456. Nancy: Université de Nancy, 1980.
- Henri Lagrave, "Mahomet second : une tragédie en prose, inachevée, de Marivaux", Revue d’Histoire Littéraire de la France, n. 71, pp. 574–584, 1971.
