= False Servant =

2000 film

- Film poster
- Directed by: Benoît Jacquot
- Based on: La Fausse Suivante by Marivaux
- Produced by: Georges Benayoun
- Starring: Isabelle Huppert
- Cinematography: Romain Winding
- Edited by: Pascale Chavance
- Distributed by: Pyramide Distribution
- Release date: 8 March 2000
- Running time: 90 minutes
- Country: France
- Language: French
- Budget: $1.5 million
- Box office: $700,000

False Servant (French: La Fausse Suivante) is a 2000 French comedy-drama film directed by Benoît Jacquot and starring Isabelle Huppert.

== Plot ==
A young woman disguises herself as a knight to expose a gold-digging man divided between her and a Countess.

== Cast ==
- Isabelle Huppert as The Countess
- Sandrine Kiberlain as The Knight
- Pierre Arditi as Trivelin
- Mathieu Amalric as Lélio
- Alexandre Soulié as Arlequin
- Philippe Vieux as Frontin

== See also ==
- Isabelle Huppert on screen and stage
