= Reprise (disambiguation) =

Reprise is the repetition of a passage in music.

Reprise may also refer to:

== Film and television ==
- "Reprise" (Angel), a 2001 episode of the television program Angel
- Reprise (film), a 2006 Norwegian film

== Music ==
- "Reprise", a song by Phase, from The Wait (Phase album)
- "Reprise", a song by the Sword from the album Used Future
- Reprise (Moby album), a 2021 album by Moby
- Reprise (Russell Watson album), a 2002 album by Russell Watson
- Reprise 1990–1999, a 1999 compilation album by Vangelis
- Reprise Records, a record label founded by Frank Sinatra

== Other uses ==
- Reprise (fencing), a term used for a certain type of attack in fencing
- La Reprise, a 1900 novel by Louis de Robert
- La Reprise (novel), a 2001 novel by Alain Robbe-Grillet
- La Reprise (play), a play created by Milo Rau in 2019 at NTGent
- Die Wiederholung / La Reprise / The Repetition, a 1995 piece of musical theatre by Heiner Goebbels

== See also ==
- La Méprise, a play by 18th-century French playwright Pierre de Marivaux
- Reprisal
