= Jakob van der Schley =

Dutch draughtsman and engraver

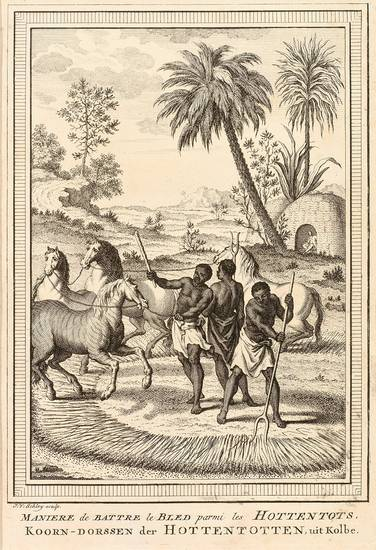
'Threshing of wheat by Hottentots'

Jakob van der Schley aka Jakob van Schley (26 July 1715 Amsterdam – 7 February 1779 Amsterdam) was a Dutch draughtsman and engraver. He studied under Bernard Picart (1673-1733) whose style he subsequently copied. His main interests were engraving portraits and producing illustrations for "La Vie de Marianne" by Pierre Carlet de Chamblain de Marivaux (1688-1763), published in The Hague between 1735 and 1747. He also engraved the frontispieces for a 15-volume edition of the complete works of Pierre de Brantôme (1540-1614), "Oeuvres du seigneur de Brantôme", published in The Hague in 1740. Most of the plates in the Hague edition of Prévost's "Histoire générale des voyages" are signed by van der Schley. He cooperated with Prosper Marchand who owned many of his prints. One of his most famous print is L’Imprimerie, 1739.
