= Triumph of Love (musical) =

- Logo
- Music: Jeffrey Stock
- Lyrics: Susan Birkenhead
- Book: James Magruder
- Basis: 1732 Pierre de Marivaux commedia dell'arte play Le Triomphe de l'Amour
- Productions: 1997 Broadway

Triumph of Love is a musical with a book by James Magruder, lyrics by Susan Birkenhead, and music by Jeffrey Stock. It is based on a play of the same name by the 18th-century French playwright Pierre de Marivaux.

== Synopsis ==
Resembling a chamber musical more than a traditional book musical, it is based on the 1732 Pierre de Marivaux commedia dell'arte play Le Triomphe de l'Amour. The story centers on Spartan princess Léonide, whose love for Agis is complicated by the fact her throne was wrongfully wrested by her family from the object of her affection. Agis has been raised an educated man ruled by reason rather than passion by his uncle Hermocrates and his aunt Hesione. The princess, conspiring with her servant Corine, disguises herself as Phocion in order to infiltrate the guarded "men-only" palace compound occupied by Agis, who is plotting her assassination. Complications ensue when both Agis and Hermocrates separately guess her secret, and she tells the former she's Cécile, on the lam from an undesirable paramour, and to the latter claims to be Aspasie, who wishes to study philosophy with him. Adding to the convoluted plot are Hermocrates' valet Harlequin and gardener Dimas.

== Background ==
Triumph of Love opened on Broadway on October 23, 1997 at the Royale Theatre, where it ran for 85 performances and 30 previews. The musical was directed by Michael Mayer and choreographed by Doug Varone. Comedian Elayne Boosler had been announced to play Corine but dropped out during rehearsals due to creative differences.

== Original cast and characters ==
Character	Broadway (1997)
Hesione	Betty Buckley
Hermocrates	F. Murray Abraham
Princess Leonide	Susan Egan
Agis	Christopher Sieber
Dimas	Kevin Chamberlin
Corine	Nancy Opel
Harlequin	Roger Bart

== Songs ==
Act I

- This Day of Days - Hesione, Harlequin, Agis, and Hermocrates
- Anything - Princess Leonide
- Classic Clown - Harlequin
- The Bond that Can't Be Broken - Princess Leonide, Agis
- Mr. Right - Corine, Harlequin
- You May Call Me Phocion - Princess Leonide, Hesione
- Mr. Right (Reprise) - Corine, Dimas
- Emotions - Hermocrates, Princess Leonide
- The Sad and Sordid Saga of Cécile - Princess Leonide, Agis, Corine, Harlequin, Dimas
- Serenity - Hesione
- Issue in Question - Agis
- Teach Me Not to Love You - The Company

Act II

- Have A Little Faith - Corine, Princess Leonide, Harlequin, Dimas
- The Tree - Hesione, Hermocrates
- What Have I Done? - Princess Leonide
- Henchmen Are Forgotten - Harlequin, Dimas, Corine
- Love Won't Take No For An Answer - Hermocrates, Hesione, Agis
- This Day of Days (Reprise) - Princess Leonide, Agis, Corine, Harlequin, Dimas

An original cast recording was released by Jay Records. As a bonus track, it included Buckley's cut solo from Act II, "If I Cannot Love."

== Critical response ==
The Variety reviewer called the musical "Modest in everything but talent and charm, this chamber-size comedy just might have the sass to take its place alongside the season’s big-budget lions."

=== Original Broadway production ===
Year	Award	Category	Nominee	Result
1998	Tony Award	Best Actress in a Musical	Betty Buckley	Nominated
1998	Drama Desk Award	Outstanding Featured Actress in a Musical	Betty Buckley	Nominated
1998	Drama Desk Award	Outstanding Lyrics	Susan Birkenhead	Nominated
1998	Drama Desk Award	Outstanding Costume Design	Catherine Zuber	Nominated
1998	Drama League Award	Distinguished Production of a Musical		Nominated

== See also ==
- Triumph of Love (2001), a film based on the same story
