= Félicie =

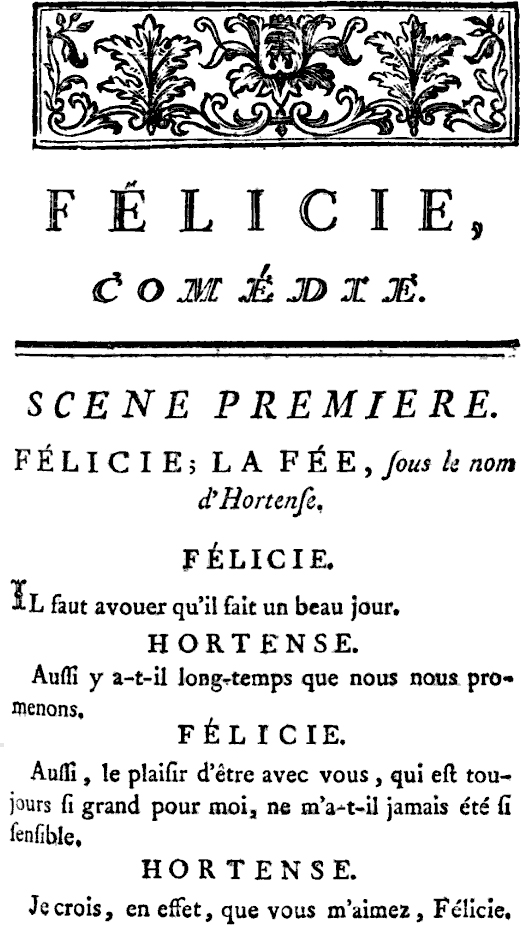
French coverpage of the play

Félicie is a play by the French playwright Pierre de Marivaux. It was published for the first time in the Mercure de France in March 1757.

It portrays the education and discipline of a young girl experiencing passionate love, who was stopped just in time by a fairy before her passion could get out of hand. However, Pierre de Marivaux did not submit this as a theatrical piece. It was thought that the dialogue in the piece would be less likely to earn aesthetic appreciation and approval than if it were left to literary expression.

== Characters ==
- Félicie
- Lucidor
- La Fée, the Fairy, under the name of Hortense
- La Modestie, Modesty
- Diane
- Troupe de chasseurs, Troop of Hunters

== Synopsis ==
In a wonderland, a young girl, Félicie, is raised by a fairy. Her godmother can make her a gift, of her choice. Félicie chooses the gift of pleasing. The fairy grants her wish.
