= Prosper Marchand =

French bibliographer (1678–1756)

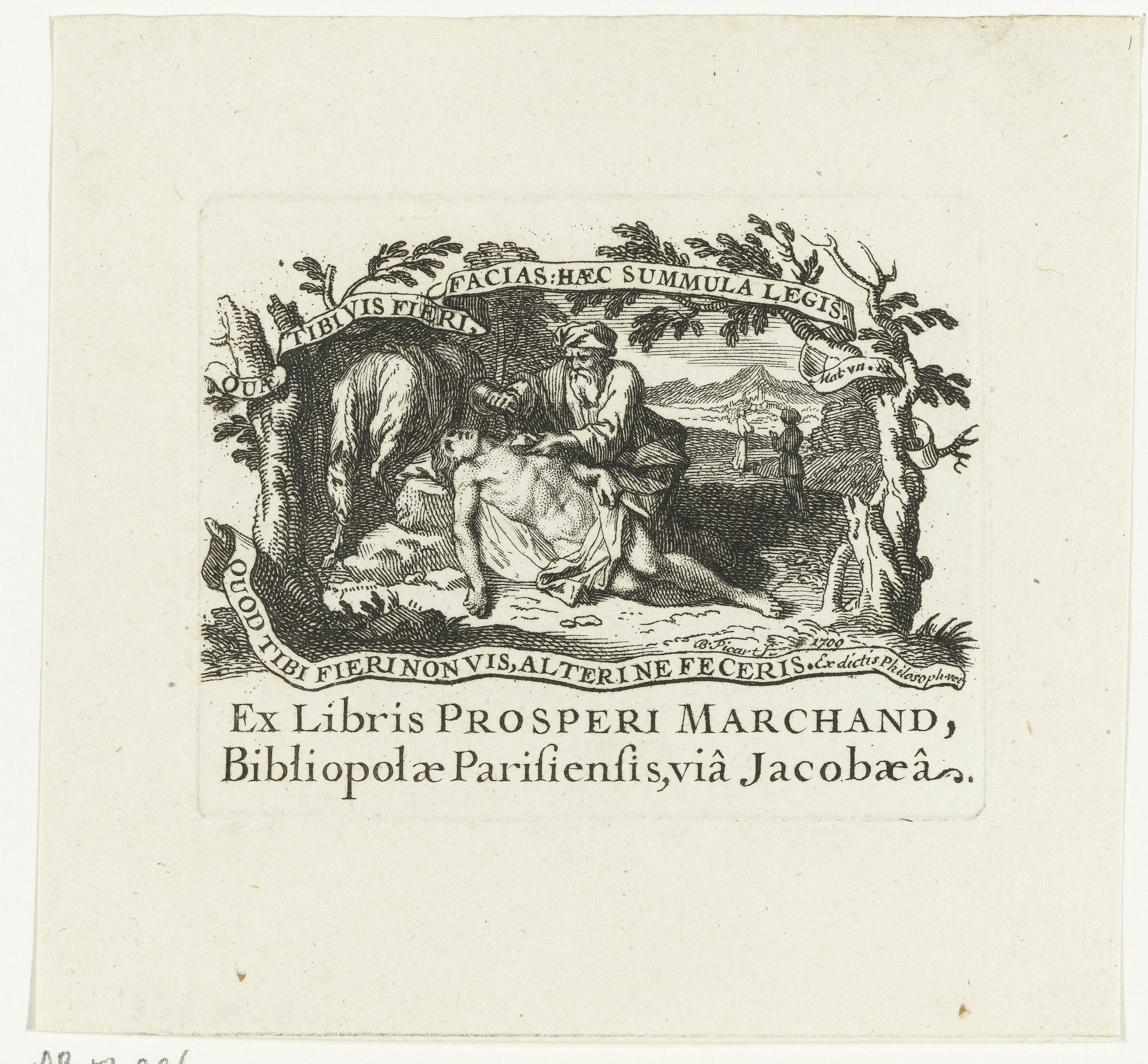
Ex-libris of Prosper Marchand by Bernard Picart

Prosper Marchand (11 March 1678 – 14 June 1756) was an 18th-century French bibliographer, who moved to the Dutch Republic in December 1709. He became a famous annotator and publisher of philosophical, religious and historical works, skilled in systematic table of contents and bibliographic indexes.

== Biography ==
The son of a king's musician, a native of Saint-Germain-en-Laye, studied in Versailles. He studied with much success and was then placed by a bookseller to learn the trade. Fascinated from childhood by books, he acquired in a short time all the necessary knowledge and was admitted in 1698 in the guild of booksellers. He established his shop only by the end of 1701, in association with Gabriel II Martin. He opened rue Saint-Jacques, under the banner Phénix, a store that soon became the meeting place for bibliophiles of the capital.

Marchand's versatility and erudition, his great knowledge of foreign languages, and his quick-witted helpfulness resulted in a wide clientele and ensured an excellent relationship with his colleagues. During the ten-year period in which Marchand worked as a Parisian publisher, i.e., between 1698 and 1709, he published some ten books. His close friendship with the highly productive publisher Gabriel Martin led, among other things, to the elaboration of a systematic classification for book catalogs as well as to the drafting and publishing of joint sales catalogs.

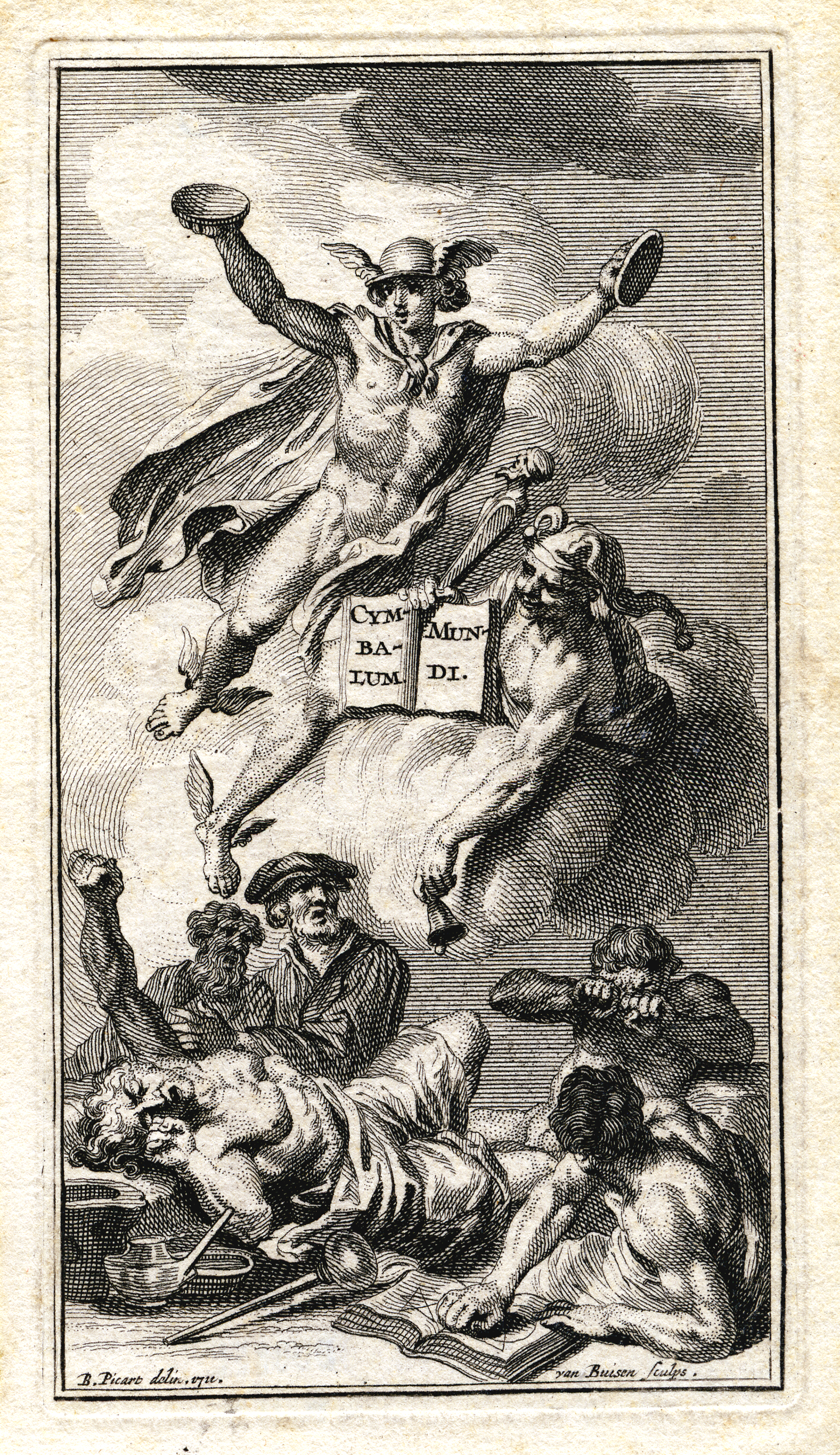
Mercury flying through the air frontispiece to Bonaventure Des Perriers, Cymbalum Mundi (Amsterdam Prosper Marchand, 1711)

Eager of literary anecdotes, he would forward them to Jacques Bernard, who then wrote in Holland the Nouvelles de la république des lettres, and he formed at the same time for his personal use, collections which were very useful to him. Marchand became anti-clerical and went to Holland in winter 1709 to more freely profess the reformed religion he had embraced. He settled in Amsterdam and continued for two years the bookselling business; but, disgusted with the lack of good faith of most of his colleagues, he gave up entirely to indulge only in studying.

Together with Bernard Picart he took refuge in The Hague for matters of religion and moved to Amsterdam in the year after. He abandoned the profession of bookseller around 1713. From 1713 to 1723, he was proofreader at Fritsch and Böhm in Rotterdam, then editor at the Journal littéraire, founded by Willem Jacob 's Gravesande and Justus van Effen. He moved back to the Hague in 1723, but between 1726 and 1735 he lived in London; he corresponded with Voltaire and Jean-Baptiste de Boyer. The lack of cash is chronic. He was booksellers catalogs editor, a review editor and author of the Dictionnaire historique ou Mémoires critiques et littéraires (1758–1759).

Marchand was involved in the publication of "Dictionnaire Historique et Critique" by Pierre Bayle. Following in Bayle's footsteps, Marchand constantly invites his readers to make comments, additions and corrections. The editions he successively published of various books became rare made him advantageously known, and he found himself looked after by all scholars of Europe who shared his tastes. The habit of a frugal life had fortified his naturally robust health, and he rarely left his office, but he was receiving all those who came to benefit his knowledge and communicated with them with pleasure. He succeeded, amid these peaceful occupations, at an advanced age, and died June 14, 1756. He bequeathed in his will, the fruit of his savings to the company of the poor of The Hague, and his rich library to the Leiden University. At the end of his life, he was attached to Daniel Monnier, a librarian in The Hague He sold his prints by Jacob van der Schley to Willem Bentinck van Rhoon.

== Publications ==
Marchand took part in the satire Chef d'œuvre d'un inconnu. He was also a principal contributor to the Journal littéraire (The Hague), a periodical published in the Netherlands.

He also left:

- The Catalogues des bibliothèques d'Em. Bigot, 1706; by Jean Giraud and Joachim Faultrier, 1709, in-8°. This catalog is rare and sought after by curious because Marchand prefaced it with his Nouveau système bibliographique (Epitome systematis bibliographici). All books were divided into three main classes: philosophy, theology and history. Marchand's system did not prevail though but we owe him significant improvements in catalography such as the arrangement of books in order of topics, without distinction of size, the exact indication of titles in different languages, that of the anonymous authors, publishers, printers, etc.;
- L'Histoire critique de l'Anti-Cotton, satire composed by César de Plaix, lawyer. It was published as a sequel of l'Histoire admirable de don Inigo de Guipuscoa (translated by Charles Levier), The Hague, 1738, 2 vol. in-12°;
- Histoire de la Bible de Sixte-Quint, avec des remarques pour connaître la véritable édition de 1590, inserted in the Amœnîtates litterariœ by SchelKorn, vol. 4;
- Histoire de l'origine et des premiers progrès de l'imprimerie, la Haye, in-4°. There is a lot of research and scholarship in this book, but little order and method: Incidentally, the progress made by literary history have shown a large number of errors; they were identified in part by the abbot Barthélemy Mercier de Saint-Léger, in his Supplément;
- Dictionnaire historique, ou Mémoires critiques et littéraires concernant la vie et les ouvrages de divers personnages distingués, particulièrement dans la république des lettres, La Haye, 1758–1759, 2 tomes in 1 vol. in-folio This book follows the Dictionnaires by Pierre Bayle and Chauffepié. The author left the manuscript but he instructed Jean Nicolas Allamand Samuel, his friend and executor, to review and publish it. To meet his confidence, Allamand spent four years putting in order Marchand's notes, most of them written on scraps of paper in a disorganized manner. It can be seen in the warning of the editor, all the trouble he had to store these notes and to supplement the omissions of Marchand. This book contains many interesting facts and curious anecdotes; but, there are also a lot of meticulous; the style is weak and incorrect; there are many serious errors and misprints; Finally, we can blame the author's passion with which he criticized the abuses of the Roman religion.

He also published many books he had enriched with prefaces, letters, notes and instructive remarks. We owe him an edition with notes of the Lettres choisies, by Pierre Bayle, Rotterdam, 1714, 3 vol. in-12°, which has not been surpassed by that of Desmaiseaux and he gave the edition of the Dictionnaire of this famous critic.

We still owe him editions of the following works: the Cymbalum mundi, by Bonaventure Des Périers, Amsterdam, 1711, in-12; it is preceded by a Lettre critique which includes the history, analysis and advocacy of this book; the Voyages by Jean Chardin, Amsterdam, 1735, 4 vol. in-4°; - l'Histoire des révolutions de Hongrie, by abbot Domokos Antal Ignácz Brenner, The Hague, 1739, 2 vol. in-4°, or 6 vol. in-12°; the Œuvres by Brantôme (with Leduchat), ibid., 1740, 15 vol. in-12°; - the Œuvres by François Villon, ibid., 1742, in-8°; - the Lettres of comte d'Estrades, London (The Hague), 1743, 9 vol. in-12°; - the Mémoires of comte de Guiche, ibid., 1744, in-12°; - Direction pour la conscience d'un roi, by Fénelon, ibid., 1747, in-8° and in-12°; -the Nouvelle histoire de Fénelon, ibid., 1747, in-12°. (See the article Salignac in the Dictionnaire by Marchand.)

== Sources ==
- Louis Gabriel Michaud. "name". Biographie universelle ancienne et moderne : histoire par ordre alphabétique de la vie publique et privée de tous les hommes avec la collaboration de plus de 300 savants et littérateurs français ou étrangers (in French) (2 ed.).

== Bibliography (selection) ==
- Le métier de journaliste au dix-huitième siècle. Correspondance entre Prosper Marchand, Jean Rousset de Missy et Lambert Ignace Douxfils. Oxford, The Voltaire Foundation at the Taylor Institution, 1993, (ISBN 0729404641)
- Jean Nicolas Samuel Allamand, « Avertissement de l'éditeur », dans Prosper Marchand, Dictionaire historique : ou mémoires critiques et littéraires concernant la vie et les ouvrages de divers personnages distingués, particulièrement dans la république des Lettres, vol.1 (A-I), La Haye, Pierre de Hondt, 1758 (Online)
- Christiane Berkvens-Stevelinck, Prosper Marchand. La vie et l'œuvre, 1678–1756, Leiden, Brill, 1987, (ISBN 9004083545
- Christiane Berkvens-Stevelinck, Catalogue des manuscrits de la collection Prosper Marchand avec la collaboration de Adèle Nieuweboer. Leiden, Brill, 1988, (ISBN 9004086188)
