= La Colonie =

La Colonie is a comedy by French playwright Pierre de Marivaux, published in 1750 in the journal Mercure de France. When it was first performed at the Comédie-Italienne on June 18, 1729, La Nouvelle Colonie did not gather success and was only staged once. Marivaux cancelled all the shows and did not publish, but he rewrote the play and reduced it to a single act composed of 18 scenes. This new version was performed and published under the title La Colonie. It is more than a baroque play, a satire of society denouncing the institutions of Marivaux's time. On an island in the middle of nowhere, women have decided to seize power. Behind the utopy, La Colonie foreshadows the feminist movements that will agitate Europe two centuries later, despite its politically and sexually conservative ending. This ironic and rich comedy raises many modern issues, and made Marivaux into a forerunner of female liberation.

== Characters ==
- Arthénice, noble woman.
- Madam Sorbin, craftsman's wife.
- Mr Sorbin, her husband.
- Timagène, noble man.
- Lina, Madam Sorbin's daughter.
- Persinet, young man of the people and Lina's lover.
- Hermocrate, gentleman and philosopher.
- Troupe of women, nobles and poor.

== Plot ==
A group of men and women from a conquered land are forced to take refuge on a desert island. They decided to establish institutions and vote for two governors for the island : Lord Timagène for the noble party and Mr Sorbin for the people. But refusing to be excluded from the new government, the women rebel against their condition of dependence and form their own council. Arthénice representing the noble party and Madam Sorbin the people. They decide to abolish love and marriage, which they consider as yet another form of female subjection, and thus forbid Lina from seeing her lover Persinet. But their support crumbles when Madam Sorbin triggers the anger of the other women by deciding that they should all make themselves ugly. When Arthénice and Madam Sorbin ask the men to give them access to all the functions the latter occupy, they delegate their powers to Hermocrate. Timagène find a solution to overturn the coup d'état by pretending they are being attacked, and sending the women to war. The latter refuse, and Madam Sorbin tells her husband to "Go to war, I'll to our home". The play ends with Timagène promising the women that their rights and best interests will be respected in the new statuses.

== Bibliography ==
- Susan Read Baker, « Sentimental Feminism in Marivaux’s La Colonie », To Hold a Mirror to Nature: Dramatic Images and Reflections, Washington, UP of America, 1982, p. 1–10.
- Derek F. Connon, « Old Dogs and New Tricks: Tradition and Revolt in Marivaux’s La Colonie », British Journal for Eighteenth-Century Studies, Autumn 1988, 11 (2), p. 173-84.
- Peter V. Conroy, Jr., « Marivaux’s Feminist Polemic: La Colonie », Eighteenth-Century Life, Oct. 1980, 6 (1), p. 43–66.
- Peter V. Conroy, « Marivaux’s The Colony », Signs, Winter 1983, 9 (2), p. 336-60.
- Walter C. Kraft, « Marivaux’s Feminism in La colonie », Proceedings: Pacific Northwest Conference on Foreign Languages, Corvallis, Ore. State U, 1974, p. 208-11
