= Le Plein de Super =

- Directed by: Alain Cavalier
- Produced by: Danièle Delorme; Yves Robert
- Starring: Patrick Bouchitey; Étienne Chicot; Bernard Crombey; Xavier Saint-Macary
- Cinematography: Jean-François Robin
- Edited by: Pierre Gillette
- Music by: Étienne Chicot
- Release date: 7 April 1976
- Country: France
- Language: French

Le Plein de Super (also known as Fill 'er Up with Super) is a 1976 French comedy and drama film directed by Alain Cavalier. The musical score was composed by Étienne Chicot. The film stars Patrick Bouchitey, Étienne Chicot, Bernard Crombey, Xavier Saint-Macary and Béatrice Agenin in the lead roles.

== Cast ==
- Patrick Bouchitey as Daniel
- Étienne Chicot as Charles
- Bernard Crombey as Klouk
- Xavier Saint-Macary as Philippe
- Béatrice Agenin as Agathe
- Nathalie Baye as Charlotte
- Catherine Meurisse as Camille
- Valérie Quennessen as Marie
