= Triumph of Love (2001 film) =

2001 film by Clare Peploe

- Directed by: Clare Peploe
- Screenplay by: Clare Peploe; Marilyn Goldin; Bernardo Bertolucci
- Based on: The Triumph of Love by Marivaux
- Produced by: Bernardo Bertolucci
- Starring: Mira Sorvino; Fiona Shaw; Jay Rodan; Rachael Stirling; Ignazio Oliva; Luis Molteni; Ben Kingsley
- Distributed by: Paramount Classics
- Release date: September 6, 2001 (Italy)
- Running time: 112 minutes
- Languages: English and French

Triumph of Love, also referred to as The Triumph of Love, is a 2001 romantic comedy film based on the 18th-century French play of the same name by Pierre de Marivaux. The film was directed by Clare Peploe, produced by her husband Bernardo Bertolucci, who co-wrote the script, and stars Mira Sorvino, Ben Kingsley, and Fiona Shaw.

== Plot ==
In an unidentified country in 18th century Europe, a usurper's daughter, The Princess, has inherited the throne and feels guilty about her family's crimes. She learns that the Queen gave birth to a prince and the rightful heir, Agis, who was secretly sent to live with the great philosopher Hermocrates and his sister Leontine. After gaining information from one of Hermocrates' servants, she goes to see Agis for herself and finds him bathing in a lake in the forest. The Princess falls in love with him at first sight, but cannot communicate freely with him as Hermocrates has taught Agis to hate all women, particularly The Princess herself, and to reject all love.

In order to gain access to their property, The Princess and her servant Corine dress as young men seeking tutelage from Hermocrates. Their plan is discovered by the Harlequin, however he readily accepts a bribe in exchange for his silence. The Princess then encounters, individually, Agis, Leontine, and Hermocrates and seduces all three. Her seduction of Agis is out of true interest, as she wishes to restore him to the throne. During their conversation The Princess reveals that she is a woman, but not her true identity. Her seduction of Leontine and Hermocrates are out of necessity, as otherwise both will throw her off the property. Leontine, who believes her to be a young man, quickly falls in love. Hermocrates is instantly able to identify The Princess as a woman, but not her true identity. The Princess manages to seduce Hermocrates by appealing to his ego and intellect. She is then forced to juggle all three relationships while trying to evade detection and deepen Agis's feelings for her.

Ultimately all three discover that they are in love with the same person, at which point The Princess reveals her true identity. She confesses her love to Agis and that she wishes to marry him in order to restore him to his rightful place as Prince. While initially upset at the deception, Agis agrees as he has truly come to love The Princess. The two leave the home in a carriage while Hermocrates and Leontine's feelings are soothed by them discovering the solution to an experiment they had been working on throughout the entire film.

== Cast ==
- Mira Sorvino as The Princess
- Rachael Stirling as Corine
- Ben Kingsley as Hermocrates
- Jay Rodan as Agis
- Ignazio Oliva as Harlequin
- Luis Molteni as Dimas
- Fiona Shaw as Leontine

== Development ==
Ben Kingsley described the character of Hermocrates as a "repressed sensualist" who must have order or "otherwise the man's in chaos". Filming for Triumph of Love took place in Tuscany, Italy during September 2000.

== Release ==
Triumph of Love premiered on September 6, 2001 at the Venice Film Festival, where bidding rights for the movie were obtained by Paramount. It received a limited theatrical run before releasing to home video in the United States in the spring of the following year.

== Reception ==
Critical reception for Triumph of Love was mixed and the film holds a rating of 49% on Rotten Tomatoes, based on 70 reviews and with the critics consensus of "Not as charming as it could have been, Triumph of Love plays too broadly and amounts to little more than a trifle." A common element of criticism was Sorvino's performance, as reviewers such as Mick LaSalle felt that she was miscast in the role. Frequently praised aspects were the acting of Kinsley and Shaw, as well as the camerawork and scenery. Roger Ebert gave Triumph of Love 3 out of 4 stars, praising the acting and highlighting a scene between Sorvino and Shaw as "one of the most delightful in the movie, as the prim spinster allows herself reluctantly to believe that she might be irresistible–that this handsome youth might indeed have penetrated the compound hoping to seduce her." Variety's David Rooney also had praise for Sorvino, calling it "her best role in years".

== See also ==
- Triumph of Love (musical)
