= Xavier Saint-Macary =

French actor (1948–1988)

- Born: June 7, 1948; Orléans, France
- Died: March 13, 1988 (aged 39); Paris, France
- Years active: 1972–1988
- Relatives: Hubert Saint-Macary (brother)

Xavier Saint-Macary (June 7, 1948 – March 13, 1988) was a French actor, the brother of Hubert Saint-Macary.

Saint-Macary played in La Nuit américaine (1973) directed by François Truffaut and Le Château perdu (1973). American audiences will remember him as the enthusiastic but bumbling Detective Fontenoy in the Disney movie Herbie Goes to Monte Carlo (1977).

Saint-Macary died of a sudden heart attack in 1988, a few months short of his 40th birthday, and is buried in the Main Cemetery of Orléans.

== Partial filmography ==
- Le Château perdu (1973, TV Movie) – Le comte de Guiche
- La Nuit américaine (1973) – Christian
- L'oiseau rare (1973) – Francis, l'amant de Renée
- Le Plein de Super (1976) – Philippe
- Herbie Goes to Monte Carlo (1977) – Detective Fontenoy
- Dites-lui que je l'aime (1977) – Michel Barbet
- Animal (1977) – Le chauffeur de Saint-Prix
- Pourquoi pas ! (1979) – Paul, le play-boy
- Le Cavaleur (1979) – Georges Jussieu
- Martin et Léa (1979) – Martin
- La Mémoire courte (1979) – Le mari de Judith
- An Adventure for Two (1979)
- Ce répondeur ne prend pas de message (1979) – L'homme
- Le point douloureux (1979) – Le serveur restaurant
- Ras le cœur (1980) – Roland
- Loulou (1980) – Bernard
- Du blues dans la tête (1981) – Jacky
- Men Prefer Fat Girls (1981) – Ronald
- Ma femme s'appelle reviens (1982) – Philippe
- Le Bourgeois gentilhomme (1982) – Dorante
- Confidentially Yours (1983) – Bertrand Fabre
- Signes extérieurs de richesse (1983) – Bianchi
- Marie Pervenche (1984-1987) - Hervé Lorieux
- Détective (1985) – Accountant
- Le Débutant (1986) – Philippe Rivière
- Corps z'a corps (1988) – M. de Villecresne
- A Few Days with Me (1988) – Paul (final film role)
