= La Vie de Marianne =

Novel by Pierre de Marivaux

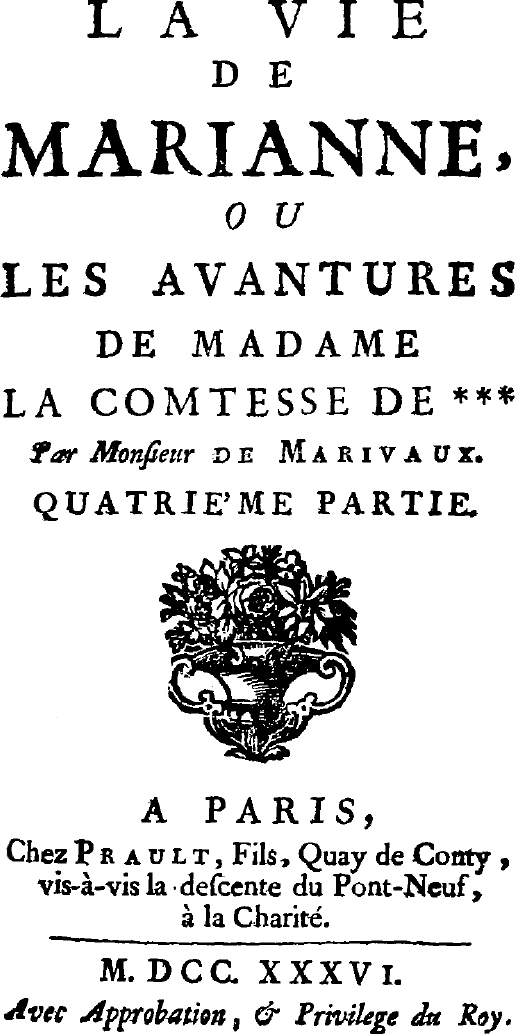
Fourth part of La Vie de Marianne (1736).

La Vie de Marianne (The life of Marianne: or, the adventures of the Countess of ***) is an unfinished novel by Pierre de Marivaux and illustrated by Jakob van der Schley.

The novel was written in sections, eleven of which appeared between 1731 and 1745. A Continuation was produced by Madame Riccoboni, but this too is incomplete.

== Bibliography ==
- (in Italian) Maria Rosaria Ansalone, Una Donna, una vita, un romanzo : saggio su “La Vie de Marianne” di Marivaux, Fasano: Schena, 1985.
- Patrick Brady, Structuralist perspectives in criticism of fiction : essays on Manon Lescaut and La Vie de Marianne, Bern; Las Vegas: P. Lang, 1978.
- Patrick Brady, Rococo Style versus enlightenment novel : with essays on Lettres persanes, La Vie de Marianne, Candide, La Nouvelle Héloïse, Le Neveu de Rameau, Geneva, Slatkine, 1984.
- Peter Brooks, The Novel of worldliness; Crébillon, Marivaux, Laclos, Stendhal, Princeton, N.J.: Princeton University Press, 1969.
- David Coward, Marivaux, La Vie de Marianne and Le paysan parvenu, London: Grant & Cutler, 1982.
- (in French) Anne Deneys-Tunney, Écritures du corps : de Descartes à Laclos, Paris: Presses universitaires de France, 1992 ISBN 978-2-13-044216-5.
- (in French) Béatrice Didier, La Voix de Marianne : essai sur Marivaux, Paris: J. Corti, 1987 ISBN 978-2-7143-0229-8.
- (in French) Annick Jugan, Les Variations du récit dans La Vie de Marianne de Marivaux, Paris: Klincksieck, 1978.
- Marie-Paule Laden, Self-imitation in the eighteenth-century novel, Princeton, N.J.: Princeton University Press, 1987 ISBN 978-0-691-06705-6.
- Leo Spitzer, Alban K. Forcione, Herbert Samuel Lindenberger, et al. Representative essays, Stanford, CA: Stanford University Press, 1988 ISBN 978-0-8047-1367-2.
- Theodore E. D. Braun, John A. McCarthy, Disrupted patterns : on chaos and order in the Enlightenment, Amsterdam; Atlanta, GA: Rodopi, 2000 ISBN 978-90-420-0550-1.
- Nancy K. Miller, The Heroine's text: readings in the French and English novel, 1722-1782, New York: Columbia University Press, 1980 ISBN 978-0-231-04910-8.
- (in French) Annie Rivara, Les Sœurs de Marianne : suites, imitations, variations, 1731-1761, Voltaire Foundation, Oxford, 1991 ISBN 978-0-7294-0413-6.
- Philip Stewart, Half-told tales : Dilemmas of meaning in three French novels, Chapel Hill: U.N.C. Dept. of Romance Languages, 1987 ISBN 978-0-8078-9232-9.
- (in French) Loïc Thommeret, La Mémoire créatrice. Essai sur l’écriture de soi au XVIIIe siècle, Paris: L’Harmattan, 2006, ISBN 978-2-296-00826-7.
- Arnold L. Weinstein, Fictions of the self, 1550-1800, Princeton, N.J.: Princeton University Press, 1981 ISBN 978-0-691-06448-2.

== External links b ==
- English translations, Internet Archive
