= Le Petit-Maître corrigé =

1734 French play by Pierre de Marivaux

Le Petit-Maître corrigé is a three-act romantic comedy by French playwright Marivaux. It was first performed on November 6, 1734, by the Comédie-Française in Paris, then located rue des Fossés-Saint-Germain-des-Près.

This play is one of the rare plays of Marivaux not performed by the Comédie Italienne. The first representation was catastrophic, seemingly because Marivaux had enemies like Voltaire and Crebillon, and also because the play has a very violent subtext against the 18th century aristocracy.

== Plot summary ==
Rosimond is coming from Paris to marry a provincial woman. As he is only obeying his parents who arranged the marriage, he is not really interested in knowing anything about Hortense, his future bride. People say that she has beautiful eyes and has a lot of wits, but Rosimond considers that she must be happy to marry a man like him, desired by all ladies in Paris and belonging to the Royal Court. When he is presented to Hortense, he talks to her with an impertinent tone which appalls her. Hortense decides that she will never marry him if he does not change his manners.

== Characters ==
- The Count, Hortense's father.
- La Marquise.
- Hortense, the Count's daughter.
- Rosimond, the Marquise's son.
- Dorimène.
- Dorante, friend of Rosimond.
- Marton, Hortense's maid.
- Frontin, Rosimond's valet
