= Le Préjugé vaincu =

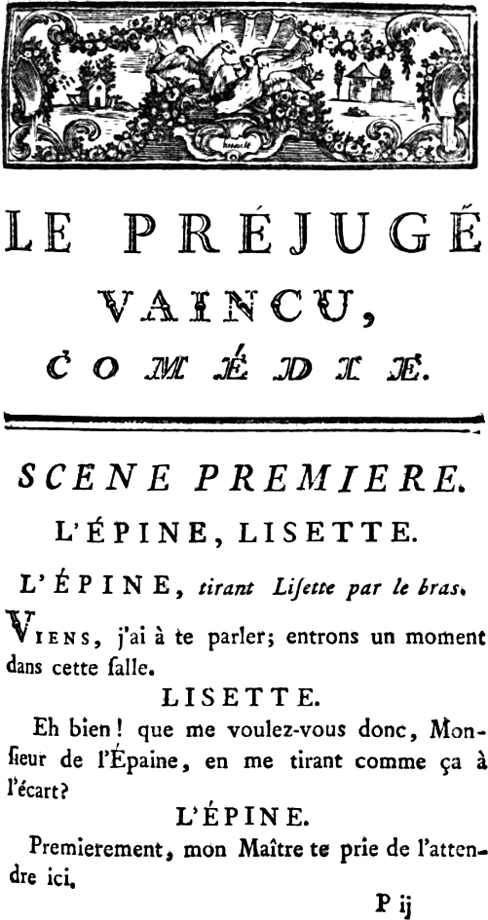
- Author: Pierre de Marivaux
- Language: French
- Genre: Comedy
- Publisher: Jacques Clousier
- Publication date: 1747
- Publication place: France
- Media type: Print

Le Préjugé vaincu is a comedy in one Act, prose, by Marivaux first performed on 6 July 1746 by the King's Ordinary Actors in the theatre of the rue des Fossés Saint-Germain.

== Characters ==
- The Marquis, Angélique's father.
- Angélique, The Marquis' daughter.
- Dorante, Angélique's lover.
- Lisette, Angélique's follower.
- L’Épine, Dorante's butler.

== Story ==
Angélique knew very well that she loved Dorante, but she didn't want to. Being the daughter of a marquis she didn't want to marry someone middle class however rich and well brought up he may be. She shared her feelings, not to her father, who looked upon this marriage with pleasure, but to Lisette her chambermaid, who, although speaking the dialect of her village, and the daughter of a simple tax lawyer was not less determined to not marry down. Dorante, as a test, said he had a partner to suggest to Angélique: a well-educated young man, rich, esteemed in all aspects, but middle class. Angélique refused. When Dorante told her that he spoke of himself, Angélique was somewhat disconcerted, but persistent. The Marquis then offered his youngest daughter to Dorante. Angélique called for Dorante; she didn't want him to see her sister, she didn't want him to leave. At first Dorante looked at her astonished then tenderly. Angélique looked at him. He fell to her feet, she made him get up: pride had given up against love.
