= The Triumph of Love (play) =

French comic play by Pierre de Marivaux

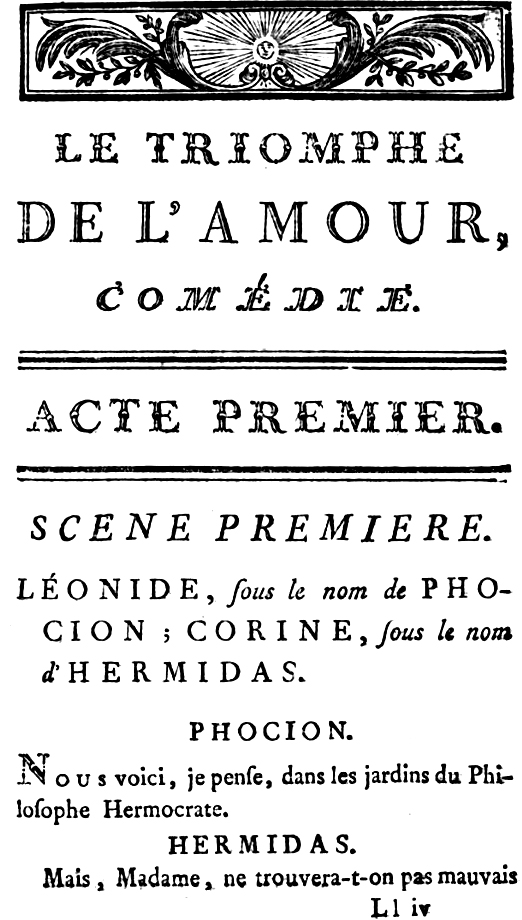
- Original language: French
- Written by: Pierre de Marivaux
- Subject: Love
- Genre: Comedy
- Setting: Hermocrate's house in Sparta, Ancient Greece

Premiere
- Date: 12 March 1732
- Place: Théâtre Italien, Paris

The Triumph of Love (French: Le Triomphe de l'amour) is a three-act French comic play by Pierre de Marivaux. It was first performed by the Théâtre Italien in Paris on 12 March 1732.

== Characters ==
- Léonide — a Spartan princess, disguised as a man called Phocion.
- Corine — her servant, disguised as a man called Hermidas.
- Hermocrates — a philosopher.
- Hesione — Hermocrates' sister.
- Agis — son of Cléomène, the deposed king of Sparta.
- Dimas — Hermocrates' gardener.
- Harlequin — Hermocrates's servant.

== Synopsis ==
Léonide, Princess of Sparta, disguises as a man called Phocion to enter the household of her enemy, Hermocrates, an old philosopher. Léonide does so because she has seen and fallen in love with a young man who lives in the household, Agis. Learning that he is the rightful heir of the late Cléomènes, King of Sparta (usurped by Léonide's own uncle in revenge for Cléomènes' kidnapping of his mistress), Léonide has determined to restore him to power.

Léonide and her servant Corine (also disguised as a man) arrives at Hermocrates' house, pretending to be philosophy students. As they discuss their plans, they are overheard by Hermocrates' servant, Harlequin, but they pay him to co-operate with them. Léonide then meets Agis by chance, but the gardener, Dimas, becomes suspicious and calls Hermocrates' spinster sister, Hesione, to expel the two 'men'. In order to stay on the premises, Léonide pretends to fall in love with Léontine, and seduces her into supporting her.

Léonide then meets Hermocrates himself, who sees through her disguise and accuses her of coming to seduce Agis. Léonide admits that she is a woman (calling herself by the false name of Aspasie), but successfully convinces Hermocrates that she has come to seduce him, not Agis. He allows her to stay. Hermocrates tells "Aspasie" that he is plotting to overthrow the Princess of Sparta and place Agis on the throne.

Léonide finally has a conversation with Agis himself. Agis, it transpires, has sworn against love, because it was love that destroyed his parents. Léonide therefore tells him that she is disguised as a man because she is a young woman fleeing persecution from the Princess of Sparta (herself, in reality), and Agis promises to help.

Léonide is now juggling three contradictory relationships: both Hesione and Hermocrates are in love with her, while she has only a passionate friendship with Agis. Over the course of the rest of the play, she works things to her advantage, while Agis falls in love with her. In the play's climax, Hermocrates, Hesione, and Agis realize they are all in love with the same person. Léonide reveals she is the princess and wishes to marry Agis, thus restoring him to the throne. Hermocrates and Hesione are left disappointed in love. A royal retinue then arrives to bring the Princess and her Prince back to the palace.

== Responses ==
The initial production of The Triumph of Love was received poorly by critics. It was felt that it was inappropriate for a princess to seduce a young man in addition to two older people of both sexes, even though the latter were her enemies. The production closed after only six performances.

In the 20th century, however, the play found some popularity. It was revived in 1912 by La Petite Scène and by the Théâtre National Populaire in 1956. Many other productions have followed. In 1997, a Broadway musical adaptation, Triumph of Love was produced, and in 2001, a film adaptation starring Mira Sorvino was released.
