= Arlequin poli par l'amour =

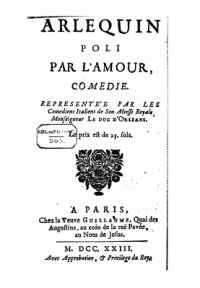
- Front page of 1723 Edition of Arlequin poli par l'amour
- Original language: French
- Written by: Pierre de Marivaux
- Characters: The fairy Trivelin; Arlequin; Silvia; A shepherd A shepherdess
- Subject: love
- Genre: Romantic comedy
- Setting: A magical forest

Premiere
- Date: 17 October 1720
- Place: France

Arlequin poli par l'amour is a one-act romantic comedy by French playwright Pierre de Marivaux. Its title could be translated into English as Harlequin, refined by love. Arlequin poli par l'amour was first performed October 17, 1720 by the Comédie Italienne. In this play, a fairy tries to force Arlequin to fall in love with her. Instead, Arlequin falls in love with Silvia, a shepherdess. With the help of the fairy's servant Trivelin, the two manage to trick the fairy and live happily ever after.

Its plot and comedic features were strongly influenced by the traditional Italian theatre of the Commedia dell'arte. Arlequin and Trivelin are stock characters of the Commedia dell'arte, and Silvia is a name associated with the female romantic lead.

Marivaux makes use of several traditional lazzi as well. For example, near the beginning of the play, Arlequin tries to catch invisible flies while the fairy is trying to have a serious conversation with him. At the end, Arlequin uses the fairy's magic wand to beat all of the characters on stage. (Arlequin and his baton are the origin of the term "slapstick".)

== Plot summary ==
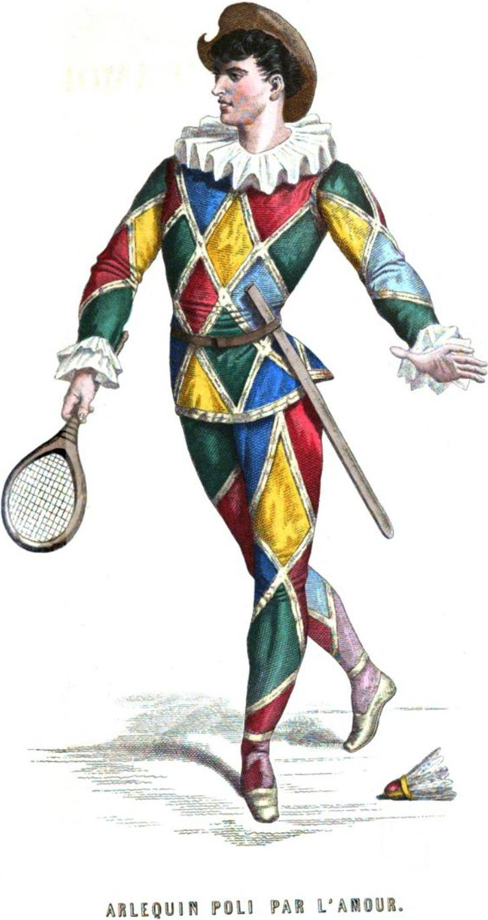
Illustration by Bertall

Having transported a sleeping Arlequin to her island, the fairy waits for him to wake up. Her servant, Trivelin, questions her devotion to the young man who is too lazy, too gourmand, and too simple to be worthy of her love. Moreover, he reminds the fairy that she is engaged to Merlin, a powerful sorcerer, and breaking the engagement could have serious consequences. When Arlequin wakes up, the fairy indulges him with romantic entertainment, but he is more concerned with a ring she wears on her finger and being fed.

Arlequin, having left the fairy's palace, stumbles upon Silvia in the forest, and the two of them fall instantly in love. Silvia gives Arlequin her handkerchief, and they agree to meet later on that evening. Back at the palace, the fairy's suspicions are aroused when Arlequin suddenly begins showing manners and acting civilized; and when she spies the handkerchief, she assumes the transformation has occurred because of love. She follows him into the forest and catches Arlequin and Silvia together. She separates the lovers and forces Silvia to tell Arlequin that she is really engaged to a shepherd from the village; the fairy also sends Trivelin to spy on them to make sure that Silvia does not disobey.

Upon hearing Silvia's lie, Arlequin threatens to kill himself. Silvia tells him the truth about the fairy's demands; and Trivelin reveals himself to the couple. However, Trivelin takes pity on Arlequin and Silvia and gives them advice on how to trick the fairy. Arlequin then pretends to reject Silvia and returns to the fairy. When he is close enough, he steals the fairy's magic wand and forces her to become his servant. Arlequin and Silvia decide to get married.

== Characters ==
- The fairy - a powerful sorceress, engaged to Merlin, but in love with Arlequin.
- Trivelin - the fairy's servant
- Arlequin - a comedic young man who loves Silvia and is loved by the fairy
- Silvia - a beautiful shepherdess
- A shepherd - a young man who loves Silvia but is ultimately rejected in favor of Arlequin
- A shepherdess - Silvia's cousin

Dancers, Singers, and Spirits.
