= Le Paysan parvenu =

Unfinished novel by Pierre de Marivaux

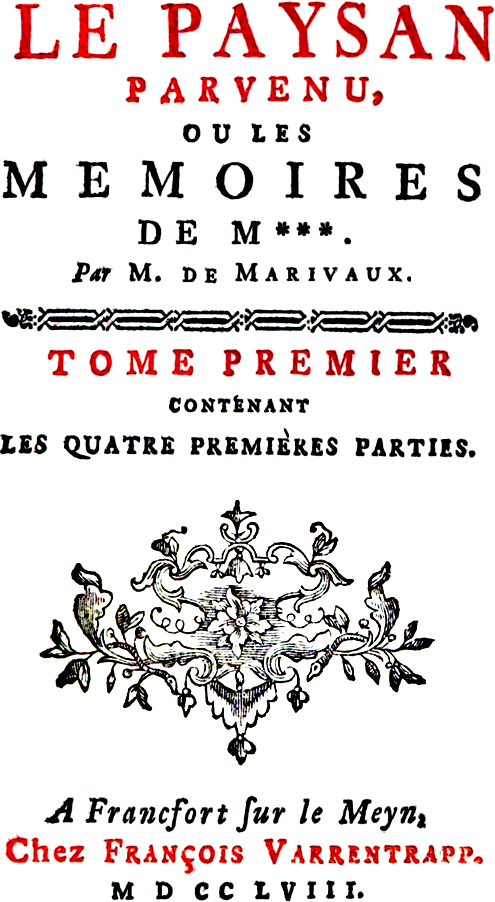
Le Paysan parvenu

Le Paysan parvenu is an unfinished novel by Pierre de Marivaux. Five parts by Marivaux appeared from May 1734 to April 1735, and an ending was added by another writer. The work is supposedly the original for subsequent tales of poor boys of a heroic nature who have "made good". The change in style is noticeable from Marivaux's literary style to the more racy conclusion written by the other author.

== Summary of plot ==
Jacob is the son of a poor peasant farmer in provincial France, and the family usually transport the wines of the local estate owner. Jacob ends up in the estate owner's house in Paris as a sort of servant, where a serving girl Genevieve falls in love with him. The master encourages them to get married with the thinly disguised attempt of keeping her as a mistress but paying Jacob handsomely. Jacob refuses to take part in this but is on the point of being forced to agree when the master dies. He leaves nothing but debts and the household is broken up.

Jacob sets off for home, and on the way passes through the town. A lady has collapsed on the bridge and Jacob picks her up and takes her home before she dies of exposure or exhaustion. She is the younger of a pair of pious middle aged sisters living together. The younger is so grateful to Jacob that she wants to help him, and Jacob is allowed to stay for the night. The interfering director (their religious advisor) does not like Jacob and stirs the elder against him. Eventually the two sisters fall into a row about him, and the younger leaves home, finding lodgings where Jacob can also stay, with Mme d’Alain and her disagreeable daughter. Eventually they decide to get married, but this results in severe opposition from the elder and the director who put every obstacle in their way, including an interview with the magistrate. However Jacob charms the company, including the influential and attractive Mme de Ferval, and so the marriage is allowed to proceed. On the way home from the interview Jacob gets involved in a domestic dispute where a man stabs his girlfriend, leaving Jacob to pick up the sword and get arrested. He spends some days in prison before his innocence is established, and finally marries Mlle Halbert.

Mme de Ferval takes an interest in Jacob and recommends him to M. de Fercourt a powerful financier who can offer him a job. However, as he is offered the job there is an appeal from an attractive girl Mme d'Orville and her mother, whose husband has just been thrown out of the job. Jacob magnanimously gives up the offer provided the husband, who is very ill is allowed to keep the job. Mme de Ferval arranges a secret rendez-vous with Jacob, but the occasion is lost when a young officer bursts in thinking there was someone else there. Jacob realises the situation he has got himself into and the nature of Mme de Ferval and gets away. In another adventure he manages to save the life of a man who has been set upon by three villains. Jacob is going to the opera with this Compte d'Orsan, when the text of Marivaux finishes.

An apocryphal suite has been written in which M. d'Orville turns out to be a wealthy man who can give Jacob a good position. Jacob's elder brother reappears after his marriage goes badly wrong and his profligate wife leaves him bankrupt. D'Orsan also introduces Mme De Vambures a wealthy widow. Jacob's wife dies and so he is free to set his hand at Mme de Vambures. Eventually they marry as do D'Orsan and Mme d'Orville. Jacob becomes wealthy and eventually his wife buys for him the estate in the village in which he grew up He therefore returns a wealthy man to meet his parents. He has three children and he also brings up his nephews and all are settled in good positions. Eventually all situations resolve themselves happily.

== Main characters ==
- Jacob le Valle
- Genevieve
- Mlle Halbert younger
- Mlle Halbert elder
- Mme de Ferval
- M d'Orville
- Mme de Vambures

== Bibliography ==
- Peter Brooks, The Novel of worldliness; Crébillon, Marivaux, Laclos, Stendhal, Princeton, N.J.: Princeton University Press, 1969.
- David Coward, Marivaux, La Vie de Marianne and Le paysan parvenu, London: Grant & Cutler, 1982.
