= La Nouvelle Colonie =

La Nouvelle Colonie or La Ligue des Femmes is a comedy in three acts and in prose written by French playwright Pierre de Marivaux. It was first performed on 18 June 1729 by the Comédie-Italienne at the Hôtel de Bourgogne. La Nouvelle Colonie was a failure, and Marivaux therefore edited and published it as La Colonie in the Mercure de France in 1750.

The fact that he published it twenty years later shows how important the subject was to Marivaux. He did not accept the way women were treated in France at the time, their humiliating education, and their inferior social status. He was in favour of women's equality, gave them lead roles usually reserved to men, and argues that their frivolity was due to the poor quality of their upbringing rather than nature. In La Nouvelle colonie, he shows women overtly revolting against oppression.

== Characters ==
- Arthénice, noble woman.
- Madam Sorbin, craftsman's wife.
- Mr Sorbin, Madam Sorbin's husband.
- Timagène, noble man.
- Lina, Madam Sorbin's daughter.
- Persinet, young mand of the people and Lina's lover.
- Hermocrate, noble man.
- Troupe of women, nobles and poor.

== Plot ==
La Nouvelle Colonie is set on a fictitious Ancient Greek island inhabited with exiles, nobles from the Ancient Times such as Arthénice and Timagène, and Modern gentlemen and gentlewomen like Mr and Madam Sorbin. The population of the island urges Timagène and Mr Sorbin to write the laws of the colony. Arthénice, loved by Timagène, and Madam Sorbin, seize the opportunity to rebel against masculine tyranny and reclaim the right to pass laws too. In her speech to the women's assembly, Arthénice unveils Marivaux's arguments to support women's right to equality, stating that their inferiority is only due to their lack of education. But Madam Sorbin divides their support by passing the law that women should all become ugly, so that men would not woo them and they would not risk being enslaved once more. The men try to appease the insurrection by reminding the women of what they call their duties, but they lack arguments and pretexts against the women's inexhaustible eloquence. Timagène eventually finds a way to stop them, by pretending that the colony is attacked and the women will have to take arms and defend their land. They then accept to go home and let the men fight an imagined menace, when Timagène promises them that their rights and interests will be taken into consideration in the new statuses of the colony.

== Analysis ==
« Minerva guides
The wise, the virtuous,
Juno presides
Over the ambitious hearts,
Venus decides
Of lovers' fate.
Everything that breathes
Lives under the power
Of such a flattering sex ».

Through subtle comparisons, Marivaux, without overtly supporting women, as he condemns their excesses and concludes the play with a return to a conservative order of society, hopes to make his reader realise certain truths about women. With the cover of satire, he reflects upon the place of women in society, disproves that only the laws of men count, and argues that women are more influential on men's decision than what the latter think.

== Bibliography ==
- (in Italian) Giovanni Saverio Santangelo, « La Nouvelle Colonie: Microcosmo dell’immaginario progressista marivaudiano? », Marivaux e il teatro italiano, Mario Matucci, Éd., Pise, Pacini, 1992, p. 99-112.
- (in French) Fabrice Schurmans, « Le Tremblement des codes dans les trois Iles de Marivaux », Revue d’Histoire du Théâtre, juil-sept. 2004, n° 3 (223), p. 195-212.
- (in French) Philip Stewart, « Iles ironiques », Impressions d’îles, Françoise Létoublon, Françoise, Éd. Toulouse, PU du Mirail, 1996, p. 271-80.
