= Georges Régnier =

French film director and screenwriter (1913–1992)

Georges Régnier (17 April 1913 – 17 January 1992) was a French film director, screenwriter and cinematographer.

== Filmography ==
Cinema

- 1947 : Combat pour tous (short film)
- 1947 : Monsieur Badin (short film)
- 1948 : Ceux du Tchad (short film)
- 1949 : Paysans noirs
- 1962 : Châteaux et rivières (documentary film)

Télévision

- 1967 : Les Sept de l'escalier quinze B
- 1970 : Nanou
- 1976 : Celui qui ne te ressemble pas
- 1983 : Pauvre Eros

Assistant director

- 1947 : Panic (Panique) by Julien Duvivier
- 1951 : Sous le ciel de Paris by Julien Duvivier
