= La Fausse Suivante =

La Fausse Suivante, ou le Fourbe puni
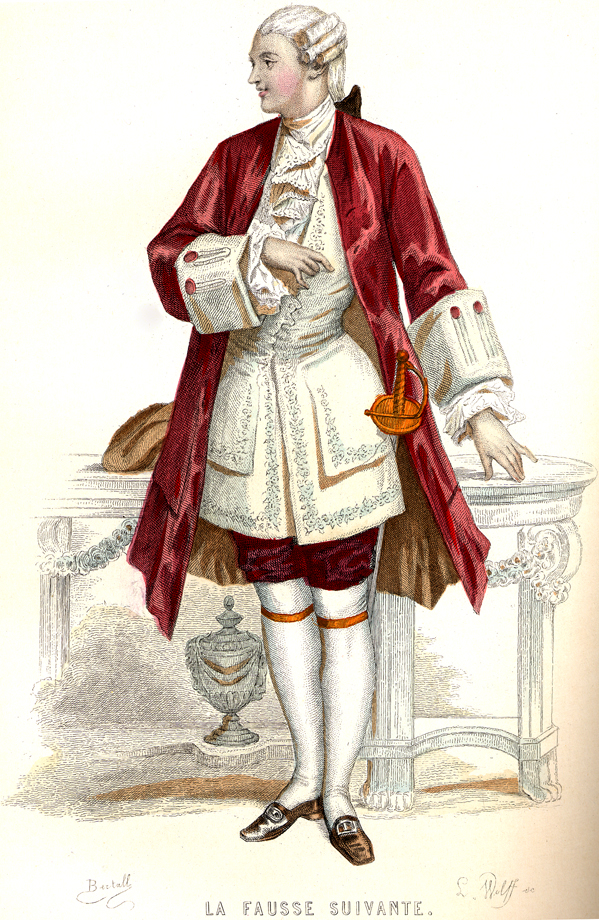
- Author: Marivaux
- Genre: Comedy
- Publisher: Briasson
- Publication date: 1724
- Publication place: France

La Fausse Suivante, or Le Fourbe Puni is a play by French playwright Pierre de Marivaux written in 1724, and produced for the first time by the Comédie-Italienne on July 8, 1724, at the theatre of the Hôtel de Bourgogne.

The themes of the play are seduction, money, power, cross-dressing. The main male character is a manipulative libertine who promises marriage to a rich countess for her fortune. The female protagonist of the play, disguised as a knight, punishes both, the man by deceit, and the woman for her frivolity.

== Characters ==
- The Countess, rich and attractive.
- Lelio, manipulative suitor.
- The Knight, a young rich Parisian woman who dresses as her own servant disguised as a knight.
- Trivelin, servant of the Knight.
- Arlequin, servant of Lelio.
- Frontin, another servant of the Knight.
- Servants, dancers, musicians.

== Plot ==
A young woman, described as "the Parisian maiden", is due to marry Lelio without having ever met him. She decides to introduce herself to him as a Knight and become his friend. Lelio confides in the Knight his troubled situation. He is promised to a Countess he seduced, in addition to the young Parisian maiden. He would choose to marry the richest of the two, that is the heroine, if he had not already signed a contract with the Countess, which would make him lose a large sum of money if he broke his engagement to her. Lelio thus challenges the Knight to seduce the Countess, so that he could marry the Parisian maiden without paying the sum. The plan seems to work at first, the Countess falls for the Knight and forgets Lelio. But information of the Knight's real sexual identity leaks among the servants, and even if she refuses to disclose her name, the Parisian maiden has to admit her sex. She disguises herself as a servant and manages to get hold of the contract. At the end of the play, she tears it in the presence of Lelio and the Countess, and both are disappointed by her deception. The young Parisian maiden finally discloses her identity, and justifies her actions by asserting her independence.

== Bibliography ==
Russo, Elena (2000). "Libidinal Economy and Gender Trouble in Marivaux's La Fausse Suivante". MLN. 115 (4): 690–713. doi:10.1353/mln.2000.0041. S2CID 161443176.

- (in French) Robert Tomlinson, « Érotisme et politique dans La Fausse Suivante de Marivaux », Stanford French Review, Spring 1985, 9 (1), 17–31.
