= Crébillon =

Crébillon is a French surname. Notable people with that name include:

- Prosper Jolyot de Crébillon (Crébillon père or Crébillon the Tragic, 1674–1762), French poet and tragedian
- Claude Prosper Jolyot de Crébillon (Crébillon fils or Crébillon the Gay, 1707–1777), French novelist and son of the above
