= Les Sincères =

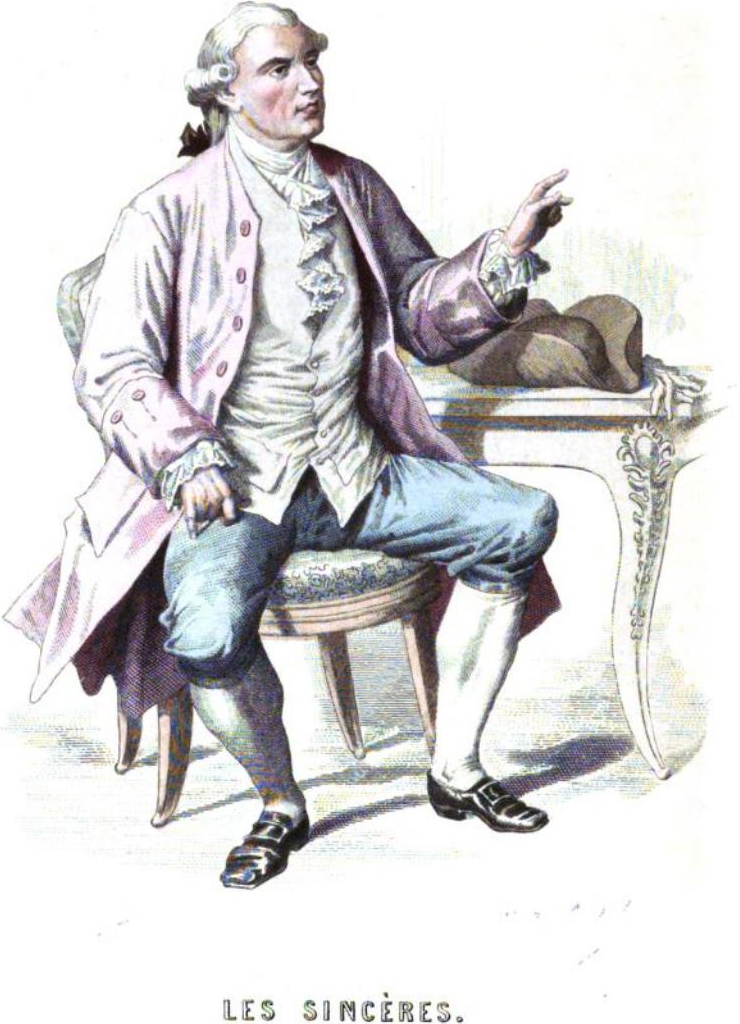
- Written by: Marivaux
- Genre: Comedy

Premiere
- Date premiered: 1739
- Place premiered: Paris, France

Les Sincères is a comedic play by French playwright Pierre Marivaux. Played in one act and in prose, it was performed for the first time by the Comédiens italiens on January 13, 1739 at the Hotel de Bourgogne in Paris.

In this play, Marivaux focuses on what happens to love when the main virtue in which the characters pride themselves is absolute sincerity. The ultimate result is a negative one. The whole play is based on the theme of sincerity, or “the insincerity of being sincere”. Marivaux does not present two sincere characters, only two people who wear the mask of sincerity. They believe straightforwardness is a quality, but only when it is a one-way action: they enjoy being sincere - in other words, saying what they think - when speaking of other people, but do not appreciate it when it is directed at them.

== Characters ==
- The Marquise
- Dorante
- Araminte
- Ergaste
- Lisette, the Marquise’s companion
- Frontin, Ergaste’s valet

== Plot summary ==
A once highly applauded performance, Les Sincères involves two couples, a master and his mistress, and a valet and a maid. The Marquise wants to love sincerely, but she does this through negative comments towards others and wishes to receive only positive ones. Although words of praise bother her, she wants others to acknowledge the grief that they cause her. She is vain, but she does not want her chambermaid to think so. Ergaste, her alter ego, claims that he has the ability to be sincere and insists that others believe him. If he had to lie to seem frank, he would do it. He prides himself on his ability to amaze and to be unique. He once realised himself guilty, just because it was his right. After having her heart dulled by Dorante’s gentleness, the Marquise seeks refuge in Ergaste. The world is filled with nothing but flattery; in all her life, he was the only man she found to be sincere.

The Marquise: I’ve only met one sincere person.

Ergaste: Who?

The Marquise: You.

To show her sincerity, the Marquise enjoys sketching the portraits of those she leaves. This leads to a series of piercing, realistic sketches that are quite malicious. Since Ergaste and the Marquise only show their sincerity at the expense of others, the two get along wonderfully as friends. But as soon as they find themselves involved, everything changes. When Ergaste tells the Marquise that he loves her she then responds, “I believe you; but have you never loved anyone more than me?” Ergaste replies, “No, on my honour, once in my life.”

Already, the Marquise is a little hurt; she then asks him a loaded question.

The Marquise: Which was more worthy of love, I or the former object of your affection?

Ergaste: But your attractions are different; she has them infinitely.

The Marquise: That is to say, a little more than myself?

Ergaste: In truth, I should be a little embarrassed to decide.

The Marquise: I am not. I pronounce: your uncertainty decides; you may be certain that you loved her more than me.

The conversation continues in this constant sullen tone, especially when the comparison takes on proper names.

Ergaste: Araminte has beauty, but you are more pleasing than she is.

The Marquise: Frankly, you are a bad judge.

Ergaste: I can answer for the sincerity of my opinions, but not for their accuracy.

The Marquise: Oh, indeed! But when one’s taste is so bad, sincerity becomes a fault!

In turn, Ergaste becomes angry and rushes back to Araminte. As for the Marquise, she gives Dorante another chance, provided that he tells her her faults. Dorante obeys, but the faults that he criticizes her for are true qualities, such that these critiques become clever compliments. Thus, the Marquise ends up marrying Dorante, someone she thought she couldn’t tolerate, and Ergaste marries Araminte.

This small act received much praise from French literary critic Sainte-Beuve, for which he made a detailed analysis.

== Notes ==
Cismaru, A. (1977). Les Sincères. Marivaux & Molière: a comparison (pp. 114–119).
