= Annibal (Marivaux) =

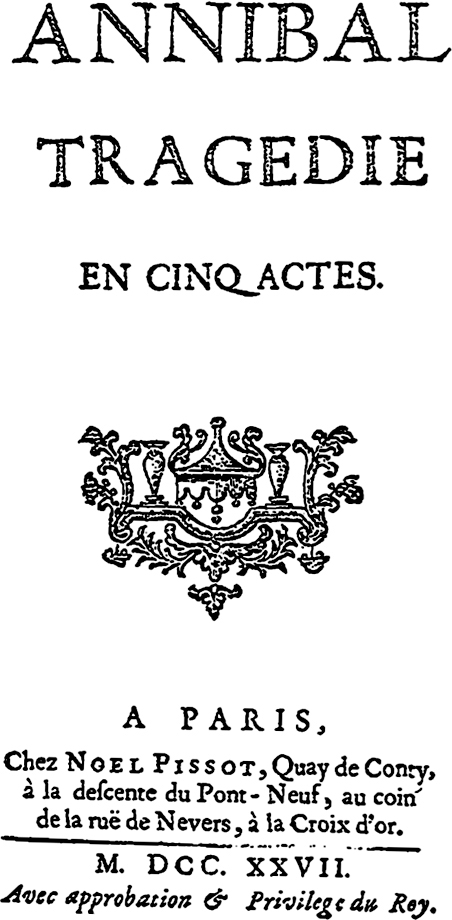
Annibal

Annibal is a play by French playwright Pierre de Marivaux, written in 1718–19 and first performed in December 1720. It is a five-act tragedy and was shown at the Comédie-Française Theater. The play focuses on a Hannibal towards the end of his life, as a dignified veteran taking refuge in Nicomedia.

== Plot ==
Hannibal is sheltering with Prusias I of Bithynia when the Roman ambassador Flaminius arrives. Prusias has promised his daughter Laodice (an invented character) to Hannibal, but Flaminius also desires her. Through the Roman's rampant abuse of state power to serve his own personal agenda, Marivaux shows a deeply hypocritical ideology at the heart of the empire.
