= La Surprise de l'amour =

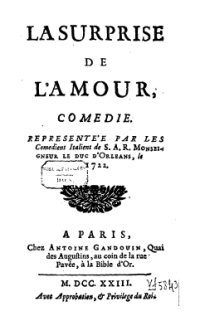
Front page of 1723 Edition of La Surprise de l'amour

La Surprise de l'amour is a three-act romantic comedy by French playwright Marivaux. Its title is usually translated into English as The Surprise of Love. La Surprise de l'amour was first performed 3 May 1722 by the Comédie Italienne at the Hotel de Bourgogne in Paris. In this play, a man and a woman who've sworn off love are tricked by their servants into falling in love with each other.

Like many of Marivaux's other comedies, La Surprise de l'amour makes use of stock characters from the Commedia dell'arte. In this play, Arlequin and Columbine are featured.

Théophile Gautier considered this to be Marivaux's finest work.

== Plot summary ==
After having been betrayed by a woman, Lélio renounces love and retires to the countryside with his valet, Arlequin, whose adventures in love are similar. Arlequin, who loves everything about women, including their faults, struggles with the task of forgetting them. One of Lélio's servants, Jacqueline, hopes to marry Pierre, a servant at the nearby home of the countess. Lélio refuses to allow the two to marry, as he imposes his own viewpoint on his entire household.

The countess, who herself refuses to love men, comes to intervene. Despite the fact that Lélio and the countess swear not to fall in love, a friend of Lélio predicts that this will come to pass. The countess decides to avoid Lélio, but in doing so, she earns his respect and sets in motion the ideas of her servant Columbine. Through the machinations of Columbine and Arlequin (who in turn fall in love themselves), the countess and Lélio ultimately end up together. The play ends with three happy couples: Lélio and the countess, Arlequin and Columbine, and Pierre and Jacqueline.

== Characters ==
- The countess - a wealthy widow who has sworn off men
- Lélio - a man who has sworn off women
- The baron - a friend of Lélio
- Arlequin - Lélio's valet
- Columbine - The countess' confidente
- Jacqueline - a female servant in Lélio's household
- Pierre - the countess' gardener
