= La Double Inconstance =

Play

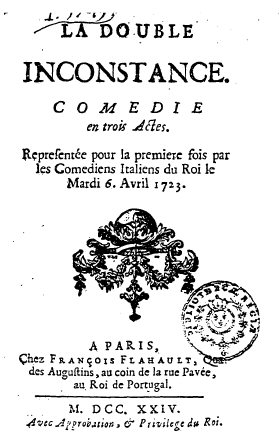
- Title page from the first edition of La Double Inconstance
- Written by: Pierre de Marivaux
- Characters: Le Prince; Silvia; Flaminia; Arlequin; Lisette; Trivelin
- Original language: French
- Subject: love, disguise
- Genre: Romantic comedy
- Setting: The prince's palace

Premiere
- Date premiered: 6 April 1723
- Place premiered: France

La Double Inconstance is a three-act romantic comedy by French playwright Marivaux. Its title is usually translated into English as The Double Inconstancy. La Double Inconstance was first performed 6 April 1723 by the Comédie Italienne. In this play, a young woman is kidnapped from her lover by the prince of the country, who loves her and intends to marry her. Through ruse and disguises, the prince and a trusty female servant manage to break up the relationship, resulting in two marriages.

Like many of Marivaux's other comedies, La Double Inconstance makes use of stock characters from the Commedia dell'arte. In this play, Arlequin and Trivelin are featured.

== Plot summary ==
Silvia is a young peasant girl who loves and is loved by Arlequin. Prior to the opening of the play, the prince meets her and instantly falls in love with her. He pretends to be a simple officer of the prince and befriends her. He is required by law to marry a commoner, so he sends his forces to kidnap her.

The play opens with Silvia in the palace, pining for her lover, Arlequin, who has also been brought to court. A female servant of the prince, Flaminia, devises a plan to separate the two lovers. She appeals to Silvia's vanity, by suggesting that she needs a more worthy lover. The prince, still disguised as the officer of the palace, continues to be her friend; and Silvia soon realizes that he is a better catch than Arlequin. Meanwhile, Flaminia befriends Arlequin and gradually seduces him away from Silvia. However, both Arlequin and Silvia feel indebted one to the other and are reluctant to separate.

When the prince finally reveals himself, both Arlequin and Silvia are relieved to know that they have an excuse to call off their engagement. The play ends with the union of the two couples: Silvia and the prince, and Flaminia and Arlequin.

== Characters ==
- The prince
- Silvia - a young peasant girl, engaged to Arlequin, but beloved by the prince
- Harlequin/Arlequin - a young peasant, engaged to Silvia
- Flaminia - a clever woman who is the prince's servant
- Lisette - Flaminia's less clever sister
- Trivelin - a male servant
- A nobleman
- Various servants

== Adaptations ==
The play La Double Inconstance was adapted into a 1968 Made-for-TV movie in France. The play La Double Inconstance is rehearsed as a play within the film in Jacques Rivette's Gang of Four In 1983, BBC Television produced the play as Infidelities for the Play of the Month series, starring Charlotte Rampling and Robin Askwith.
