= La Méprise =

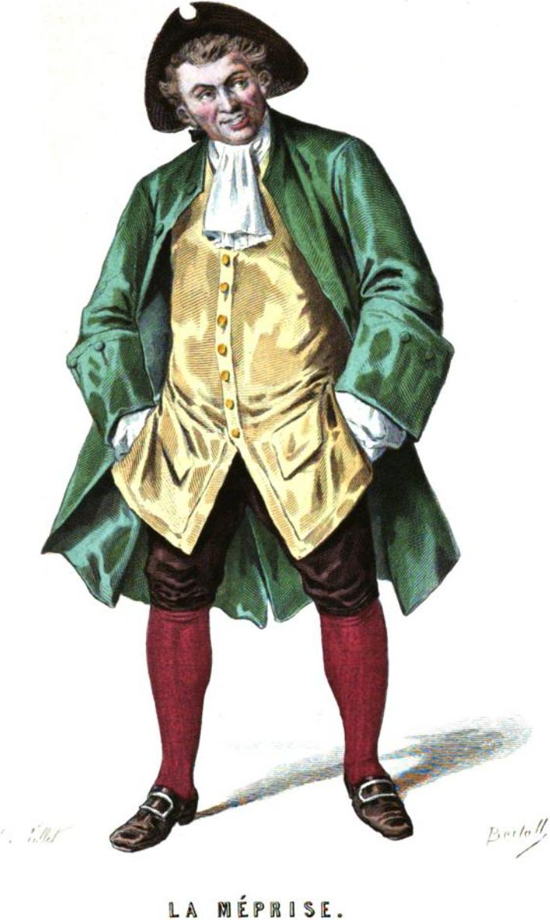
The Misunderstanding (1734) by Pierre de Marivaux (1688-1763)

La Méprise is a comedy in one act and in prose, written by French playwright Pierre de Marivaux and first performed on 6 August 1734, by the Comédie-Italienne at the théâtre of the Hôtel de Bourgogne.

== Characters ==
- Clarice
- Hortense, Clarice's sister
- Ergaste
- Lisette, Clarice's servant
- Arlequin, Hortense's servant
- Frontin, Ergaste's servant.

== Plot ==
Two sisters, both blonde and charming, dress the same. The play is set in a park, where the young ladies are having a walk, hiding their face behind a mask. Ergaste, the lover, thinks he is talking to one sister when in fact it is the other. quid pro quos follow, until the two sisters disappear together.

== Bibliography ==
- (in French) Lucette Desvignes, "Marivaux et La Méprise : exploration d’un thème antique", Revue de Littérature Comparée, n. 41, pp. 166–179, 1967.
- (in French) Jean Fleury, Marivaux et le marivaudage, Paris: Plon, 1881.
