= L'Île de la raison =

L’Île de la raison (The Island of reason) ou les petits hommes (or little men)
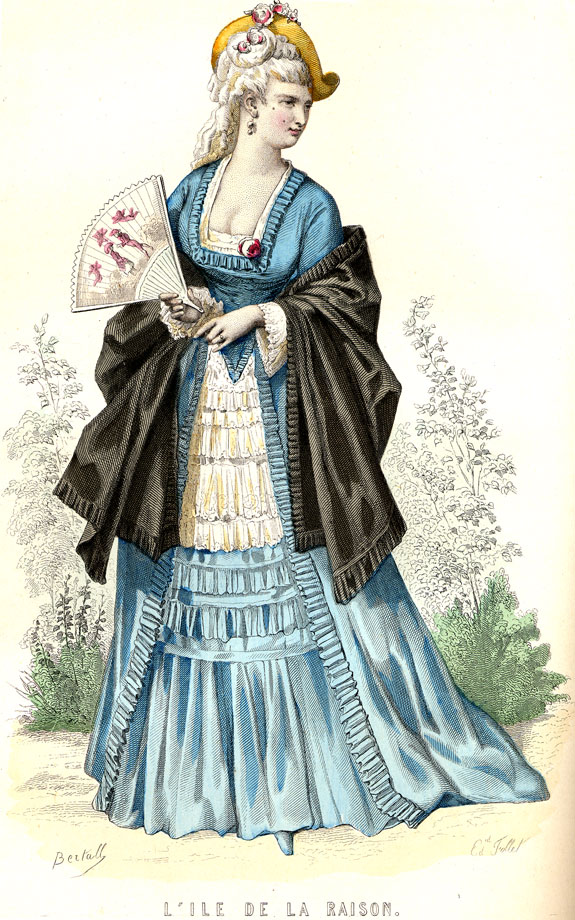
- Illustration by Bertall for the Isle of Reason
- Original language: French
- Written by: Pierre de Marivaux
- Characters: The Governor; The Courtier; The secretary The Countess; Spinette; The poet The philosopher The Doctor; The farmer
- Genre: Comedy
- Setting: The Island of Reason

Premiere
- Date: 11 September 1727
- Place: Paris

L'Île de la raison (lit. The Island of Reason) is a social comedy in three acts and in prose by French playwright Pierre de Marivaux, represented for the first time 11 September 1727 by the Comédie-Française.

== Analysis ==
L'Île de la raison covers the same topics as L'Île des esclaves and develops them further.

The essential defect of The Island of reason was that its representation on stage needed an impossible optical trick: in Marivaux's mind, the characters of the play are dwarfs that grow slowly and reach the size of a man as their reason increases. This effect was impossible to show to the audience, even if they were informed of the fact. They would have to imagine that individuals whose size does not vary in their eyes, are first dwarves at the beginning of the piece, and ordinary men and women at the end.

Marivaux thought that he could remedy this deficiency by placing a prologue at the beginning of his comedy. Also, in the first scene, the governor of the island and his daughter share some observations about the little things that the shipwreck has thrown in their island, and they handle them like the people of Brobdingnag treated Gulliver; but these explanations didn't get enough attention on the subject.

== Reception ==
Very badly received by the public at the first performance, Island of reason was played only four times. Although it abounds in beautiful details and especially witty spiritual comments, this is less of a play than a philosophical essay. Marivaux wrote a preface in which he acknowledges that the piece is unplayable:

I was wrong to give this comedy to the theaters. It was not a good play when represented, and the public has done it justice by condemning it. No plot, little action, little interest; this subject, as I conceived it, was not capable of that. It was too singular, and it was that singularity that made me fail: it amused my imagination. I finished the piece quickly, because I did it easily.

When it was finished, everyone to whom I read it, everyone who read it themselves, all men of sense, couldn't finish it. Beauty, pleasure, everything was there, they said, never, perhaps, reading has provoked so much laughter. I did not trust that: the book had been too easy to be so good. I knew all the faults I have said; and in detail, I saw many things that could have been better, but as they were, I found them good. And even if the performance had achieved half the fun it achieved in reading, it would have been a great success.

But all that changed in the theater. These little men who became fictitiously large, have not done anything. Eyes did not cry, and it felt like that was always repeating itself. Disgust came, and, like that, the play was lost. If they had only read it, perhaps they would think differently: and, by a simple motive of curiosity, I would like to find someone who did not heard about it, and who would tell me his feelings after reading it: it would thus be otherwise than it is, if I had not thought about representing it.

I printed the play the day after the performance, because my friends, who were more upset than me about her failure, had advised me to do it in a way so urgent that I think that a refusal would have shocked them: I preferred to follow their opinion, than to reject it.

At the end, I did not cut off anything, not even the places that we blamed in the role of the peasant, because I did not know, and now that I know, I frankly confess that I don't feel what they have of bad in themselves. I only understand the disgust we had for them being spoiled, plus they were in the mouth of an actor whose acting, naturally fine and free, didn't adjust perhaps to what they have of rustic.

Some people have believed that, in my prologue, I attacked the comedy French in London. I will only say that I did not thought this, and that this is not my character. The way I have so far treated the matter of wit is well away from these small-meanness there, so it's not a criticism that I exonerate, is an insult of which I complain.

— Marivaux

== Characters ==
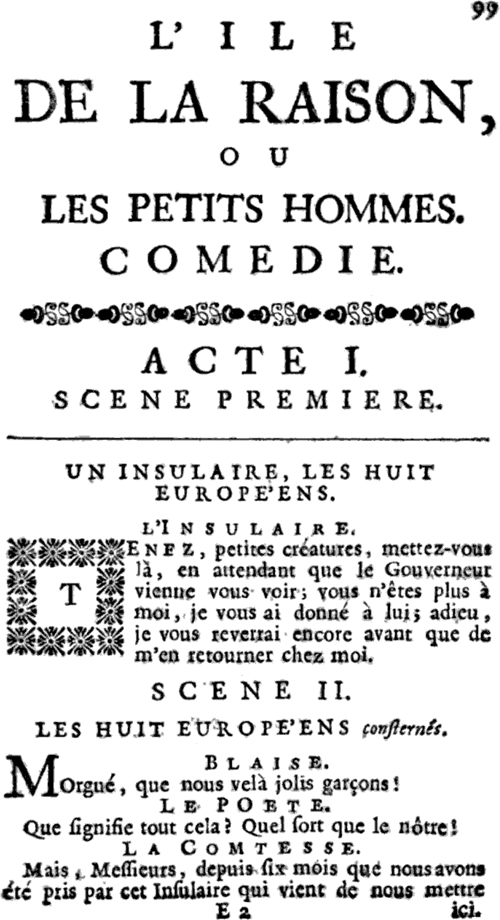
Front page of The Isle of Reason, 1754

Prologue:

- The Marquis
- The Knight
- The Countess
- The Advisor

Play:

- The Governor
- Parmenas, son of the Governor
- Floris, daughter of the Governor
- Blectrue, Advisor to the Governor
- Islander
- A Islander
- Megisti, servant from the island
- Retinue of the Governor
- The Courtier
- The Countess, sister of The Courtier
- Fontignac, Gascon, secretary of The Courtier
- Spinette, following The Countess
- The Poet
- The Philosopher
- The Doctor
- The peasant Blaise

== Plot ==
On the island of reason all people are reasonable. As the sage Blectrue, advisor to the governor of the island, explains to newcomers, it is women who pay court to the men. When individuals who are not reasonable land there, they lose their size in proportion to their degree of madness. Eight French land in this island: a courtier, his gascon secretary, named Frontignac, a countess and her maid Spinette, a poet, a philosopher, a doctor and a farmer.

In their capacity as French, these characters have become dwarfs on arrival, but they are so in various degrees. One whose size is less affected by Blaise is the peasant, and therefore, he is the most reasonable. Blaise agrees frankly that he often overstepped the rules of temperance, and he often wanted to deceive the purchasers of his products. As he admits his mistakes and takes the resolution to correct them, he grows up in the eyes of his companions.

Once healed, he begins to heal the Gascon, who, accepting sincerely that he was a liar, braggart and flatterer, also resumes his size. The Gascon, in turn, confesses and heals the maid. As for the doctor, who has become almost undetectable, he must promise to stop "curing" his patients and to let them die on their own to recover its size. The Countess must, in turn, has to correct her coquetry, her pride and feigned politeness. She even decides to make a statement to the son of the governor of the island, and she gets back the size she was before the wreck.

The hardest conversion is that of the courtier, whose secretary has the greatest difficulty in reminding him of his loans, left and right, never returned, his false protestations of friendship, his love of praise. The courtier finally confesses his wrongs, and tending his hand to the farmer and the gascon, who showed them to him. Only the poet and philosopher refuse to admit they were wrong, and remain incurable. Spinette decides, as the Countess, to make a statement and it is well received, and everything ends in marriages.
