= L'Épreuve =

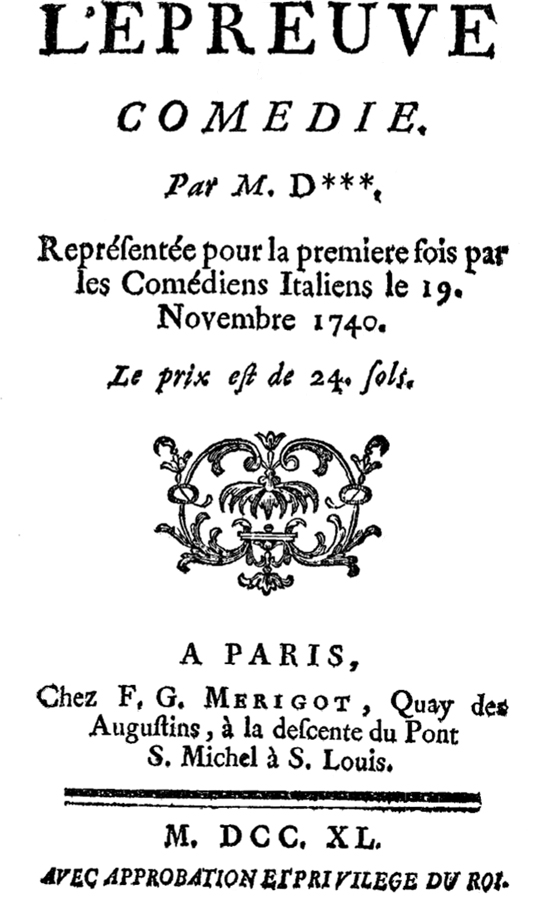
- L'Épreuve
- Author: Pierre de Marivaux
- Genre: Comedy
- Publisher: Mérigot
- Publication date: 1740
- Publication place: France

L'Épreuve is a one-act play by French playwright Pierre de Marivaux presented for the first time on 19 November 1740.

L'Épreuve is considered to be one of the finest gems of Marivaux and was often reproduced. Like in many of his plays, the untying of intrigue comes from travesty.

== Characters ==
- Madame Argante.
- Angélique, her daughter.
- Lisette, Angélique's servant.
- Lucidor, Angélique's lover.
- Frontin, Lucidor's valet.
- Maître Blaise, young village farmer.

== Plot ==
Lucidor, a wealthy Parisian, is in love with Angélique, a young and innocent country bourgeois. After falling ill and watching Angélique cry for him, he is convinced that she loves him as well, but he is unsure of the motives behind this love. He thus decides to put Angélique through an ordeal to test whether he is loved for his money or for himself. In the name of friendship, Lucidor offers a rich friend to be married to Angélique to see whether she would reject him for love. In fact, this rich friend is none other than Lucidor's valet, who is dressed up in rich man's gear only for this trick.

== Bibliography ==
- Derek F. Connon, « The Servant as Master: Disguise, Role-Reversal and Social Comment in Three Plays of Marivaux », Studies in the Commedia dell'Arte, Cardiff, U of Wales P, 1993, p. 120-37.
- (in French) Antoine Spacagna, « Le Jeu linguistique et l'épreuve dans l'Épreuve », Langue, littérature du XVII^{e} et du XVIII^{e} siècle : mélanges offerts à M. le Professeur Frédéric Deloffre, Paris, SEDES, 1990, p. 393-404.
