= The Game of Love and Chance =

Play by Marivaux

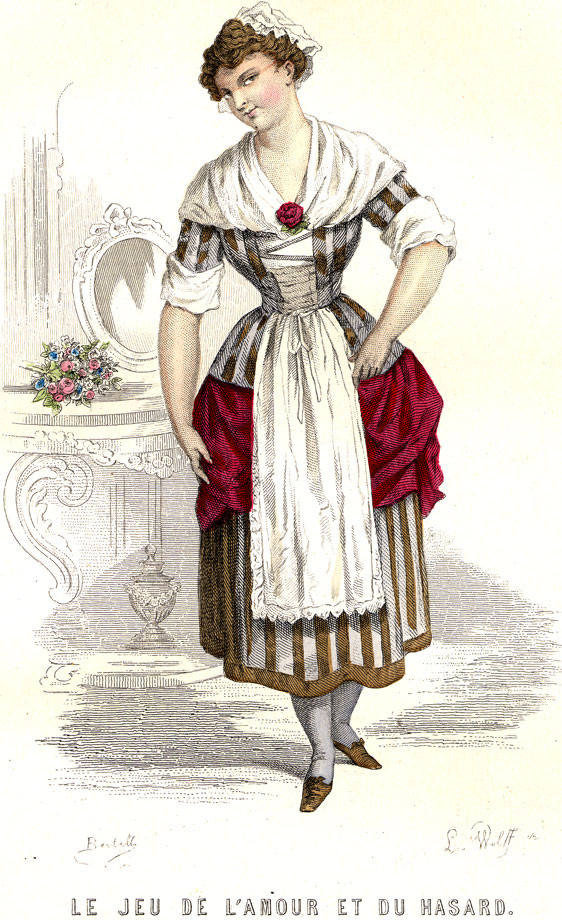
- Le Jeu de l'amour et du hasard
- Original language: French
- Written by: Pierre de Marivaux
- Characters: Silvia; Dorante; Monsieur Orgon; Mario; Arlequin; Lisette
- Subject: love
- Genre: Romantic comedy
- Setting: Monsieur Orgon's home

Premiere
- Date: 23 January 1730
- Place: France

The Game of Love and Chance (French: Le Jeu de l'amour et du hasard, pronounced [lə ʒø də lamuʁ e dy azaʁ]) is a three-act romantic comedy by French playwright Marivaux. The Game of Love and Chance was first performed 23 January 1730 by the Comédie Italienne. In this play, a young woman is visited by her betrothed, whom she does not know. To get a better idea of the type of person he is, she trades places with her servant and disguises herself. However, unbeknownst to her, her fiancé has the same idea and trades places with his valet. The "game" pits the two false servants against the two false masters, and in the end, the couples fall in love with their appropriate counterpart.

Like many of Marivaux's other comedies, The Game of Love and Chance makes use of stock characters from the Commedia dell'arte. In this play, Arlequin is featured. Lisette, who appears in other Marivaux plays, also takes on a stock personality as the feisty servant.

== Plot summary ==
Silvia is engaged to marry Dorante, a man she has never met. She is afraid to marry him without knowing what type of man he is, and he is planning to visit her very soon to formalize the engagement. In order to observe Dorante's true personality during his visit, she asks her father if she can change clothes with her servant, Lisette, so that she can watch him without his knowing her identity. Monsieur Orgon immediately agrees, having coincidentally received a letter from Dorante's father explaining how Dorante planned to disguise himself as his servant in order to achieve the same goal as Silvia. Monsieur Orgon sees this as an opportunity to play the game of love and chance, allowing the two to fall in love in spite of themselves.

Dorante arrives at Monsieur Orgon's house disguised as a servant named Bourguignon, while Arlequin comes dressed as Dorante. However, Silvia and Dorante's refined behavior is evident, in spite of their servant's attire; and Arlequin and Lisette are unable to recognize the difference between true manners and the gross exaggerations they exact while playing their roles as master.

Dorante and Silvia fall in love, but as neither knows the other's true status, they find themselves in a social dilemma, each believing to be a noble in love with a servant. Finally, Dorante relents and reveals his identity to Silvia. Relieved, Silvia nonetheless decides to continue to play the game, hoping that Dorante will go so far as to renounce his fortune in order to marry her (thinking she is a servant).

The play ends with the union of the two couples: Silvia and Dorante, and Lisette and Arlequin.

== Characters ==
- Silvia - a headstrong young woman, engaged to Dorante
- Dorante - a proper young man, engaged to Silvia
- Monsieur Orgon - Silvia's father
- Mario - Silvia's brother
- Arlequin - Dorante's valet
- Lisette - Silvia's maid
- A lackey

== Adaptations ==
The play The Game of Love and Chance has been produced several times in France:

- Le Jeu de l'amour et du hasard (made for TV, 1954)
- Le Jeu de l'amour et du hasard (made for TV, 1967)
- Although it is not really an adaptation, the French film L'Esquive (2003) revolves around modern high school students in the suburbs of Paris who attempt to produce The Game of Love and Chance as part of a literature course. Several scenes from the play are shown in rehearsal or in performance.
- The Takarazuka Revue produced a musical adaptation of the play in 2011.
- Que d'amour (2013, TV adaptation, directed by Valérie Donzelli, with actors from the Comédie française)
- “The Game of Love and Chance” (2023, Shaw Festival, Niagara-on-the-Lake. Ontario, Canada, Shawfest.com) Improv version directed by Tim Carroll
