= Gérard Marx =

French film director

- Born: France
- Occupation: Director
- Years active: 1978–present

Gérard Marx is a French César Award nominee director.

== Filmography ==
| Year | Title | Notes |
|---|---|---|
| 1978 | Nuit féline | Also Writer; Short; Montreal World Film Festival - Grand Prize (Short Films); Prix Jean Vigo - Short Film; Nominated - César Award for Best Short Film |
| 1981 | Rendez-vous hier | Also Writer; Short |
| 1982 | A propos du travail | Also Writer; TV Movie |
| 1984 | Quidam | TV movie |
| 1985 | Série noire | Also Writer; TV Series (1 episode) |
| 1985 | Néo Polar | TV series (1 episode) |
| 1989 | Juliette en toutes lettres | TV series (1 episode) |
| 1990-2002 | Navarro | TV series (13 episodes) |
| 1991 | Piège pour femme seule | TV movie |
| 1992 | Le chinois | TV mini-series |
| 1992 | Nestor Burma | TV series (1 episode) |
| 1993 | Embrasse-moi vite ! | TV movie |
| 1994 | L'instit | TV series (1 episode) |
| 1994 | Deux justiciers dans la ville | TV series (1 episode) |
| 1995 | Une femme dans mon coeur | TV movie |
| 1997 | La belle vie | TV mini-series |
| 1998 | Les insoumis | TV movie |
| 1999 | Mission protection rapprochée | TV series (2 episodes) |
| 1999 | Justice | TV series (4 episodes) |
| 2001 | Commissaire Moulin | TV series (1 episode) |
| 2001 | La crim' | TV series (4 episodes) |
| 2002 | L'été rouge | TV mini-series |
| 2003 | Capitaine Lawrence | TV movie |
| 2003 | Le prix de l'honneur | TV movie |
| 2004 | Electrochoc | TV movie |
| 2004 | Clara et associés | TV series (1 episode) |
| 2004 | Fargas | TV series (2 episodes) |
| 2005 | L'empire du tigre | TV mini-series Luchon International Film Festival - Grand Prize Mini-Series |
| 2005 | Si j'avais des millions | TV series (2 episodes) |
| 2006 | Femmes de loi | TV series (2 episodes) |
| 2007–present | Section de recherches | TV series (29 episodes) |
| 2008 | Paris enquêtes criminelles | TV series (4 episodes) |
| 2009 | Central nuit | TV series (1 episode) |
| 2009 | Brigade Navarro | TV series (2 episodes) |
| 2011 | Brassens, la mauvaise réputation | TV movie |
