= L'Île des esclaves =

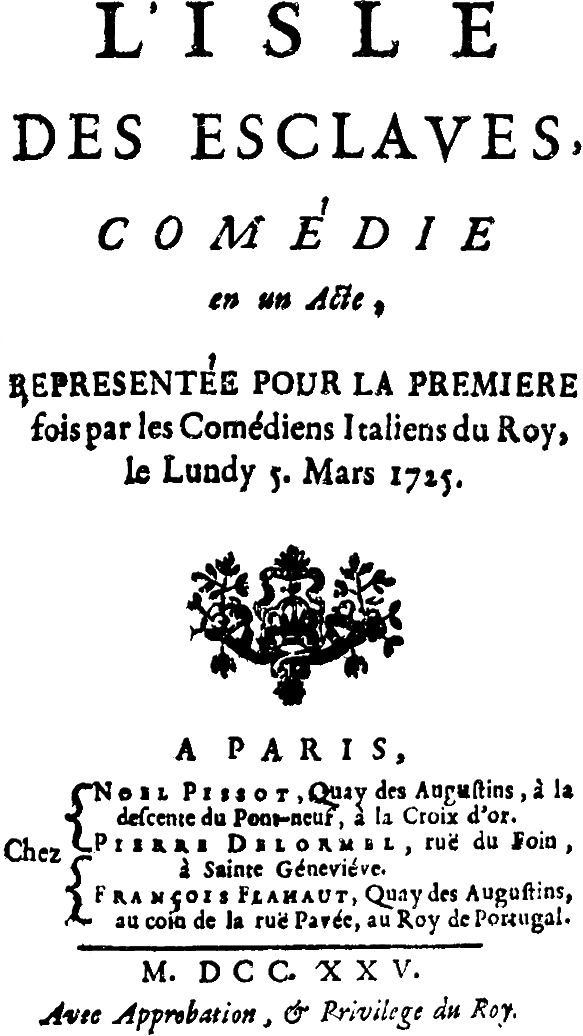
- Title page from the first edition of L'Île des esclaves
- Original language: French
- Written by: Pierre de Marivaux
- Characters: Arlequin; Iphicrate; Cléanthis; Euphrosine; Trivelin
- Genre: Comedy
- Setting: Off the coast of Athens, Greece

Premiere
- Date: 5 March 1725
- Place: Hôtel de Bourgogne

L’Île des esclaves (English: Slave Island) is a one-act comedy by Pierre de Marivaux; it was the first of three plays in the series. It was presented for the first time on March 5, 1725 at the Hôtel de Bourgogne by the Comédie Italienne; an actress named Silvia played Cléanthis and Thomassin played the role of Arlequin.

The play is characterized by a mixing of genres: Greek characters, a shipwreck leaning towards tragedy, and social commentary. However, the play is essentially a comedy with its confusion of sentiments, exchange of power between masters and valets, and finally the appearance of Arlequin.

== Plot summary ==
Iphicrate and his slave Arlequin find themselves shipwrecked on Slave Island, a place where masters become slaves and slaves become masters. Trivelin, the governor of the island, makes Arlequin and Iphicrate, as well as Euphrosine and her slave Cléanthis, change roles, clothes, and names.

Both Arlequin and Cléanthis take advantage of the situation to expose the frivolities and fickleness of their masters. However, Arlequin is ultimately touched by the tears of Euphrosine, who is suffering from humiliation at the hands of Cléanthis. Arlequin and Iphicrate make amends and return to their original roles; Euphrosine and Cléanthis do the same. Trivelin reveals that had Arlequin and Cléanthis not pardoned their masters, that they would have been punished.

== Characters ==
- Iphicrate, an Athenian general.
- Arlequin, his slave.
- Euphrosine, an Athenian noblewoman.
- Cléanthis, her slave.
- Trivelin, the master of the island.
- Inhabitants of the island
