= Pierre de Marivaux =

French playwright and novelist (1688–1763)

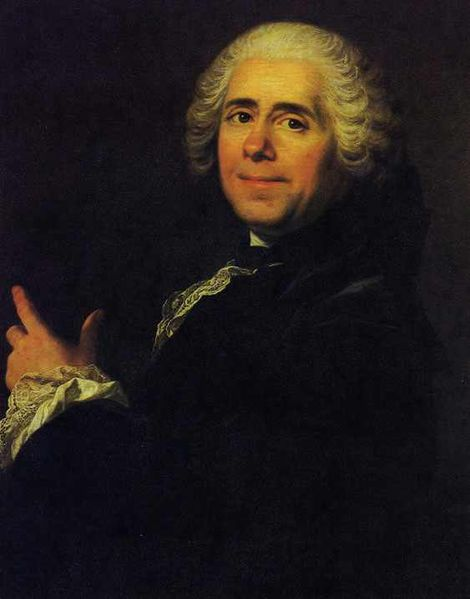
- Portrait of Marivaux by Louis-Michel van Loo
- Born: Pierre Carlet de Chamblain de Marivaux; 4 February 1688; Paris, France
- Died: 12 February 1763 (aged 75); Paris, France
- Occupation: Playwright
- Writing career
- Period: Enlightenment
- Genre: Romantic comedy
- Literary movement: Lumières

Pierre Carlet de Chamblain de Marivaux (/mærɪˈvoʊ/; French: [pjɛʁ kaʁlɛ də ʃɑ̃blɛ̃ də maʁivo]; 4 February 1688 – 12 February 1763), commonly referred to as Marivaux, was a French playwright and novelist.

Marivaux is considered one of the most important French playwrights of the 18th century, writing numerous comedies for the Comédie-Française and the Comédie-Italienne of Paris. His most important works are Le Triomphe de l'amour, Le Jeu de l'amour et du hasard and Les Fausses Confidences. He also published a number of essays and two important but unfinished novels, La Vie de Marianne and Le Paysan parvenu.

== Life ==
Marivaux's father was a Norman financier whose name from birth was Carlet, but who assumed the surname of Chamblain, and then that of Marivaux. He brought up his family in Limoges and Riom, in the province of Auvergne, where he directed the mint.

Marivaux is said to have written his first play, the Père prudent et équitable, when he was only eighteen, but it was not published until 1712, when he was twenty-four. However, the young Marivaux concentrated more on writing novels than plays. In the three years from 1713 to 1715 he produced three novels – Effets surprenants de la sympathie; La Voiture embourbée, and a book which had three titles – Pharsamon, Les Folies romanesques, and Le Don Quichotte moderne. These books are very different from his later, more famous pieces: they are inspired by Spanish romances and the heroic novels of the preceding century, with a certain mixture of the marvelous.

Then Marivaux's literary ardour entered a new phase. He parodied Homer to serve the cause of Antoine Houdar de La Motte, (1672–1731) an ingenious paradoxer; Marivaux had already done something similar for François Fénelon, whose Telemachus he parodied and updated as Le Telemaque travesti (written in 1714 but not published until 1736). His friendship with Antoine Houdar de La Motte introduced him to the Mercure, the chief newspaper of France, and he started writing articles for it in 1717. His work was noted for its keen observation and literary skill. His work showed the first signs of what is now called "marivaudage," the flirtatious bantering tone characteristic of Marivaux's dialogues. In 1742 he became acquainted with the then-unknown Jean-Jacques Rousseau, helping him revise a play, Narcissus, though it wasn't produced till long afterwards.

Marivaux is reputed to have been a witty conversationalist, with a somewhat contradictory personality. He was extremely good-natured but fond of saying very severe things, unhesitating in his acceptance of favours (he drew a regular annuity from Claude Adrien Helvétius) but exceedingly touchy if he thought himself in any way slighted. At the same time, he was a great cultivator of sensibility and unsparingly criticized the rising philosophes. Perhaps for this reason, Voltaire became his enemy and often disparaged him. Marivaux's friends included Helvétius, Claudine Guérin de Tencin, Bernard le Bovier de Fontenelle and even Madame de Pompadour (who allegedly provided him with a pension). Marivaux had one daughter, who became a nun; the duke of Orleans, the regent's successor, furnished her with her dowry.

== Literary career ==
The early 1720s were very important for Marivaux; he wrote a comedy (now mostly lost) called L'Amour et la vérité, another comedy, Arlequin poli par l'amour, and an unsuccessful tragedy, Annibal (printed 1737). In about 1721, he married a Mlle Martin, but she died shortly thereafter. Meanwhile, he lost all of his inheritance money when he invested it in the Mississippi scheme. His pen now became almost his sole resource.

Marivaux had a connection with two fashionable theatres: Annibal had played at the Comédie Française and Arlequin poli at the Comédie Italienne. He also endeavoured to start a weekly newspaper, the Spectateur Français, to which he was the sole contributor. But his irregular work ethic killed the paper after less than two years. Thus, for nearly twenty years, the theatre, especially the Comédie Italienne, was Marivaux's chief support. His plays were well received by the actors of the Comédie Française, but were rarely successful there.

Marivaux wrote between 30 and 40 plays, the best of which are La Surprise de l'amour (1722), the Triomphe de Plutus (1728), Jeu de l'amour et du hasard (1730) (The Game of Love and Chance), Les Fausses confidences (1737), all produced at the Italian theatre, and Le Legs (1736), produced at the French. At intervals, he returned to journalism: a periodical publication called L'Indigent philosophe appeared in 1727, and another called Le Cabinet du philosophe in 1734. But the same causes which had proved fatal to the Spectateur prevented these later efforts from succeeding.

In 1731 Marivaux published the first two parts of his great novel, Marianne. The eleven parts appeared at intervals over the next eleven years, but the novel was never finished. In 1735 another novel, Le Paysan parvenu, was begun, but this also was left unfinished. Marivaux was elected a member of the Académie Française in 1742. For the next twenty years, he contributed occasionally to the Mercure, wrote plays and reflections (which were seldom of much worth), and so forth. He died on 12 February 1763, aged seventy-five.

== Marivaudage ==
The so-called marivaudage is the main point of importance about Marivaux's literary work, though the best of the comedies have great merits, and Marianne is an extremely important step in the development of the French novel. That, and Le Paysan parvenu, have some connection to the work of Samuel Richardson and Henry Fielding. In general, Marivaux's subject matter is the so-called "metaphysic of love-making." As Claude Prosper Jolyot Crébillon said, Marivaux's characters not only tell each other and the reader everything they have thought, but everything that they would like to persuade themselves that they have thought.

This style derives mainly from Fontenelle and the Précieuses, though there are traces of it even in Jean de La Bruyère. It abuses metaphor somewhat, and delights to turn a metaphor in an unexpected and bizarre fashion. Sometimes a familiar phrase is used where dignified language would be expected; sometimes the reverse. Crébillon also described Marivaux's style as an introduction of words to each other which have never made acquaintance and which think that they will not get on together (this phrase is itself rather Marivaux-esque). This kind of writing, of course, recurs at several periods of literature, especially at the end of the 19th century. This fantastic embroidery of language has a certain charm, and suits the somewhat unreal gallantry and sensibility which it describes and exhibits. Marivaux possessed, moreover, both thought and observation, besides considerable command of pathos.

== Works ==
=== Plays ===
- 1712: Le Père prudent et équitable
- 1720: L'Amour et la Vérité
- 1720: Arlequin poli par l'amour (Harlequin's Lesson of Love)
- 1720: Annibal, his only tragedy
- 1722: La Surprise de l'amour (The Agreeable Surprise)
- 1723: La Double Inconstance (Infidelities)
- 1724: Le Prince travesti
- 1724: La Fausse Suivante ou Le Fourbe puni (The False Servant)
- 1724: Le Dénouement imprévu
- 1725: L'Île des esclaves (Slave Island)
- 1725: L'Héritier de village
- 1726: Mahomet second (unfinished prose tragedy)
- 1727: L'Île de la raison ou Les petits hommes
- 1727: La Seconde Surprise de l'amour
- 1728: Le Triomphe de Plutus (Money Makes the World Go Round)
- 1729: La Nouvelle Colonie lost and then rewritten in 1750 with the title of La Colonie
- 1730: Le Jeu de l'Amour et du Hasard (The Game of Love and Chance)
- 1731: La Réunion des Amours
- 1732: Le Triomphe de l'amour (The Triumph of Love)
- 1732: Les Serments indiscrets (Careless Vows)
- 1732: L'École des mères
- 1733: L'Heureux Stratagème (Successful Strategies)
- 1734: La Méprise
- 1734: Le Petit-Maître corrigé
- 1734: Le Chemin de la fortune
- 1735: La Mère confidente
- 1736: Le Legs (The Legacy)
- 1737: Les Fausses Confidences (The False Confidences)
- 1738: La Joie imprévue
- 1739: Les Sincères (The Test)
- 1740: L'Épreuve
- 1741: La Commère
- 1744: La Dispute (A Matter of Dispute)
- 1746: Le Préjugé vaincu
- 1750: La Colonie
- 1750: La Femme fidèle
- 1757: Félicie
- 1757: Les Acteurs de bonne foi (The Constant Players)
- 1761: La Provinciale

=== Journals and essays ===
- 1717–1718: Lettres sur les habitants de Paris
- Lettres contenant une aventure
- Pensées sur differents sujets
- 1721–1724: Le Spectateur français
- 1726: L'Indigent philosophe
- 1734: Le Cabinet du philosophe

=== Novels ===
- 1713–1714: Les Effets surprenants de la sympathie
- 1714: La Voiture embourbée — an "improvised" novel (roman impromptu)
- 1714: Le Bilboquet
- 1714: Le Télémaque travesti
- 1716–1717: L'Homère travesti ou L'Iliade en vers burlesques
- 1737: Pharsamon ou Les Folies romanesques (Pharsamond, or the New Knight-Errand)

=== Unfinished novels ===
- begun in 1727: La Vie de Marianne (The Life of Marianne)
- begun in 1735: Le Paysan parvenu (The Upstart Peasant)

== Adaptations ==
Triumph of Love, a 1997 musical stage adaptation of Marivaux's play The Triumph of Love had a brief Broadway run.

=== Film and television ===
- I nostri figli, directed by Ugo Falena (Italy, 1914, short film, based on the play The Game of Love and Chance)
- Monsieur Hector, directed by Maurice Cammage (France, 1940, based on the play The Game of Love and Chance)
- El juego del amor y del azar, directed by Leopoldo Torres Ríos (Argentina, 1944, based on the play The Game of Love and Chance)
- Le Jeu de l'amour et du hasard, directed by Marcel Bluwal (France, 1967, TV film, based on the play The Game of Love and Chance)
- La Double Inconstance, directed by Marcel Bluwal (France, 1968, TV film, based on the play Double Inconstancy)
- Caribia – Ein Filmrausch in Stereophonie, directed by Arthur Maria Rabenalt (West Germany, 1978, based on the play La Dispute)
- Les Fausses Confidences, directed by Daniel Moosmann (France, 1984, based on the play Les Fausses Confidences)
- La Fausse Suivante, directed by Patrice Chéreau (France, 1985, TV film, based on the play La Fausse Suivante)
- La Vie de Marianne, directed by Benoît Jacquot (France, 1995, TV film, based on the novel La Vie de Marianne)
- False Servant, directed by Benoît Jacquot (France, 2000, based on the play La Fausse Suivante)

Marivaux's play The Triumph of Love (1732) was filmed in English in 2001 as Triumph of Love, starring Mira Sorvino, Ben Kingsley, and Fiona Shaw. It is, so far, the only one of Marivaux's plays ever to be filmed in English. The film received modestly favourable reviews, but was not a box office success.

In the French film L'Esquive (2003), directed by Abdellatif Kechiche, Arab-French adolescents in a Paris suburb prepare and perform Marivaux's play Le Jeu de l'amour et du hasard.
