= Étienne Bierry =

French actor and theatre director (1918-2015)

- Born: 13 October 1918; Bordeaux
- Died: 4 July 2015 (aged 96)
- Occupations: Stage and film actor, theatre director
- Spouse: Renée Delmas

Étienne Bierry (13 October 1918 – 4 July 2015) was a French stage and film actor as well as a theatre director.

With his spouse Renée Delmas, Étienne Bierry was managing director of the Théâtre de Poche Montparnasse from 1958 to 2011. He was the father of Liliane Bierry, Florence Génin, Marion Bierry, theatre director and Stéphane Bierry, comedian

== Filmography ==
=== Cinema ===
- 1961 : La Peau et les Os by Jean-Paul Sassy - (Gagnaire)
- 1961 : The Nina B. Affair by Robert Siodmak - (Dietrich)
- 1961 : Le Tracassin by Alex Joffé - (the agent in front of the foreign ambassy)
- 1962 : Les Culottes rouges by Alex Joffé - (Schmidt, le chef de baraque)
- 1962 : Horace 62 by André Versini
- 1962 : Le Bateau d'Émile by Denys de La Patellière - (Marcelin, a fisherman)
- 1962 : Le Monte-Charge by Marcel Bluwal - (Un bistrot)
- 1963 : Ballade pour un voyou by Claude-Jean Bonnardot - (Max)
- 1964 : Le Gros Coup by Jean Valère - (L'hôtelier)
- 1964 : Requiem pour un caïd by Maurice Cloche - (inspector Le Gall)
- 1965 : The Shameless Old Lady by René Allio - (Albert)
- 1965 : Le Faiseur by Jean-Pierre Marchand
- 1965 : Les Survivants by Dominique Genee
- 1966 : Objectif 500 millions by Pierre Schoendoerffer - (Douard)
- 1966 : Le Voyage du père by Denys de La Patellière - (Le bistrot)
- 1966 : Thursday We Shall Sing Like Sunday by Luc de Heusch - (Devos)
- 1969 : Sous le signe du taureau by Gilles Grangier - (Lambert, a technician)
- 1971 : Le Miroir 2000 by Jean Couturier & François Villiers
- 1971 : Le Saut de l'ange by Yves Boisset
- 1975 : La Soupe froide by Robert Pouret - (Maury)
- 1975 : Raging Fists by Éric Le Hung - (the father)
- 1975 : A Happy Divorce by Henning Carlsen - (Pierre)
- 1977 : Pourquoi ? by Anouk Bernard - (the father)
- 1989 : Pentimento by Tonie Marshall - (Lambert)
- 1999 : Sachs' Disease by Michel Deville - (M. Ménard)
- 2004 : Un 14 juillet short film by Nathalie Saugeon - (the man)

=== Television ===
- 1959 : La caméra explore le temps : L'Enigme de Pise by Stellio Lorenzi
- 1959 : La caméra explore le temps : Le Véritable Aiglon by Stellio Lorenzi
- 1959 : Marie Stuart (by Friedrich Schiller), téléfilm by Stellio Lorenzi : Davidson
- 1961 : La caméra explore le temps : L'Enigme de Saint-Leu by Stellio Lorenzi
- 1961 : Les Cinq Dernières Minutes, épisode L'Avoine et l'Oseille by Claude Loursais
- 1962 : L'inspecteur Leclerc enquête La Trahison de Leclerc by Marcel Bluwal
- 1962 : Le Théâtre de la jeunesse : Un pari de milliardaire by Marcel Cravenne
- 1964 : La caméra explore le temps : Le Drame de Mayerling by Stellio Lorenzi
- 1964 : La caméra explore le temps : La Terreur et la vertu by Stellio Lorenzi
- 1966 : La caméra explore le temps : Les Cathares by Stellio Lorenzi
- 1966 : Derrière l'horizon by Jean-Pierre Marchand
- 1966 : La Grande Peur dans la montagne by Pierre Cardinal
- 1967 : En votre âme et conscience, L'Affaire Dumollard : as Dumollard
- 1967 : La Bouquetière des innocents by Lazare Iglesis
- 1967 : Les Enquêtes du commissaire Maigret : L'Inspecteur Cadavre by Michel Drach, Cavre
- 1968 : Les Bas-fonds by Jean-Paul Sassy
- 1971 : Les Nouvelles Aventures de Vidocq by Marcel Bluwal
- 1972 : La Vallée sans printemps by Claude-Jean Bonnardot
- 1973 : Un client sérieux by Jean Bertho
- 1973 : Au bout du rouleau by Claude-Jean Bonnardot
- 1973 : La Ligne de démarcation by Jacques Ertaud
- 1974 : Taxi de nuit by Jean Leduc
- 1974 : Un bon patriote by Gérard Vergez
- 1974 : Le Vagabond by Claude-Jean Bonnardot
- 1974 : L'Homme du fleuve by Jean-Pierre Prévost
- 1975 : Pays by Jacques Krier
- 1976 : Grand-Père Viking by Claude-Jean Bonnardot
- 1976 : Le Cousin Pons by Guy Jorré
- 1977 : La Foire by Roland Vincent
- 1978 : Double Détente by Claude-Jean Bonnardot
- 1979 : Pierrette by Guy Jorré
- 1980 : Le Petit Théâtre d'Antenne 2 : En attendant Polo by Georges Sonnier, TV director Roland Coste
- 1981 : La Vie des autres (episode "Christophe"), TV serial by Gilles Legrand
- 1982 : Les Amours des années grises : Histoire d'un bonheur by Marion Sarraut
- 1982 : Ralentir école by Alain Dhouailly
- 1982 : L'Enfant et les magiciens by Philippe Arnal
- 1990 : Les Cinq Dernières Minutes : Le Miroir aux alouettes by Guy Jorré
- 1991 : Marie la louve by Daniel Wronecki

== Theatre ==
=== Comedian ===
- 1950 : Junon et le paon by Seán O'Casey, directed by Philippe Kellerson, Théâtre de l'Œuvre
- 1951 : Les Radis creux by Jean Meckert, directed by Pierre Valde, Théâtre de Poche Montparnasse
- 1955 : Le Scieur de long by Marcel Moussy, Théâtre du Tertre
- 1956 : The Lower Depths by Maxim Gorky, directed by Sacha Pitoëff, Théâtre de l'Œuvre
- 1958 : Gontran 22 by Alexandre Arnoux, directed by Robert Marcy, Théâtre des Bouffes-Parisiens
- 1958 : Procès à Jésus by Diego Fabbri, directed by Marcelle Tassencourt, Théâtre Hébertot
- 1958 : Éboulement au quai nord by Ugo Betti, directed by Marcelle Tassencourt, Théâtre de Poche Montparnasse
- 1959 : Les Petits Bourgeois by Maxim Gorky, directed by Grégory Chmara, Théâtre de l'Œuvre
- 1959 : Le Client du matin by Brendan Behan, directed by Georges Wilson, Théâtre de l'Œuvre
- 1961 : Waiting for Godot by Samuel Beckett, directed by Roger Blin, Théâtre de l'Odéon
- 1962 : Baby foot by Robert Soulat, directed by Gabriel Garran, Théâtre de Poche Montparnasse
- 1962 : L'Étoile devient rouge by Seán O'Casey, directed by Gabriel Garran, Théâtre de la Commune, Théâtre Récamier
- 1963 : Les Viaducs de la Seine-et-Oise by Marguerite Duras, directed by Claude Régy, Poche Montparnasse
- 1963 : Les Enfants du soleil by Maxim Gorky, directed by Georges Wilson, TNP Théâtre de Chaillot
- 1964 : Les Viaducs de la Seine-et-Oise by Marguerite Duras, directed by Claude Régy, Poche Montparnasse
- 1964 : La Tragédie de la vengeance after Cyril Tourneur, directed by Francis Morane and Jean Serge, Théâtre Sarah-Bernhardt
- 1964 : Le Trèfle fleuri by Rafael Alberti, directed by Pierre Debauche, Théâtre Daniel Sorano Vincennes
- 1964 : Uncle Vanya by Anton Chekov, directed by Sacha Pitoëff, Théâtre Moderne
- 1966 : Vous vivrez comme des porcs by John Arden, directed by Guy Rétoré, Théâtre de l'Est parisien
- 1967 : Le Duel d'Anton Tchekov, directed by André Barsacq, Théâtre de l'Atelier
- 1968 : Biedermann et les incendiaires by Max Frisch, directed by Bernard Jenny, Théâtre du Vieux-Colombier
- 1969 : Les Nonnes by Eduardo Manet, directed by Roger Blin, Théâtre de Poche Montparnasse
- 1970 : Amédée, or How to Get Rid of It by Eugène Ionesco, directed by Jean-Marie Serreau, Théâtre de Poche Montparnasse
- 1971 : La Peau d'un fruit sur un arbre pourri by Victor Haïm, directed by Jean-Paul Roussillon, Théâtre de Poche Montparnasse
- 1974 : Chez Pierrot by Jean-Claude Grumberg, directed by Gérard Vergez, Théâtre de l'Atelier
- 1975 : La Caverne d'Adullam by Jean-Jacques Varoujean, directed by Étienne Bierry, Théâtre de Poche Montparnasse
- 1977 : Lady Strass by Eduardo Manet, directed by Roger Blin, Théâtre de Poche Montparnasse
- 1979 : Neige by Romain Weingarten, directed by the author, Théâtre de Poche Montparnasse
- 1981 : Le Butin by Joe Orton, directed by Étienne Bierry, Théâtre de Poche Montparnasse
- 1981 : Accordez vos violons by Victor Haïm, directed by Étienne Bierry, Théâtre de Poche Montparnasse
- 1981 : Interviouve by Louis-Ferdinand Céline, directed by Jean Rougerie, Théâtre de Poche Montparnasse
- 1982 : Baron, Baronne by Jean-Jacques Varoujean, directed by Étienne Bierry, Théâtre de Poche Montparnasse
- 1982 : Souvenirs du faucon maltais by Jean-Pierre Enard, directed by Étienne Bierry, Théâtre de Poche Montparnasse
- 1983 : Krapp's Last Tape by Samuel Beckett, directed by Michel Dubois, Théâtre de Poche Montparnasse
- 1984 : L'Elève de Brecht by Bernard Da Costa, directed by Nicolas Bataille, Théâtre de Poche Montparnasse
- 1984 : La Dernière Classe by Brian Friel, directed by Jean-Claude Amyl, Théâtre des Mathurins
- 1985 : Fool for love by Sam Shepard, directed by Andréas Voutsinas, Espace Pierre Cardin
- 1986 : Amédée, or How to Get Rid of It by Eugène Ionesco, directed by Étienne Bierry, Théâtre de Poche Montparnasse
- 1987 : Variations sur le canard by David Mamet, directed by Jacques Seiler, Théâtre de Poche Montparnasse
- 1988 : Docteur Raguine after Anton Chekov, directed by Julian Negulesco, Théâtre de Poche Montparnasse
- 1988 : Krapp's Last Tape by Samuel Beckett, directed by Étienne Bierry, Théâtre de Poche Montparnasse
- 1988 : Le Plus Heureux des trois by Eugène Labiche, directed by Étienne Bierry, Théâtre de Poche Montparnasse
- 1989 : Visite d'un père à son fils by Jean-Louis Bourdon, directed by Georges Werler, Théâtre de Poche Montparnasse
- 1990 : Chambre 108 by Gérald Aubert, directed by Georges Werler, Théâtre de Poche Montparnasse
- 1992 : Montaigne ou Dieu que la femme me reste obscure by Robert Pouderou, directed by Pierre Tabard, Théâtre de Poche Montparnasse
- 1992 : Clotilde et moi after the Contes cruels by Octave Mirbeau, directed by Marion Bierry, Théâtre de Poche Montparnasse
- 1994 : Silence en coulisses ! by Michael Frayn, directed by Jean-Luc Moreau, Théâtre du Palais-Royal
- 1994 : Retour à Pétersbourg by Gilles Costaz, directed by Georges Werler, Théâtre de Poche Montparnasse
- 1998 : Horace by Corneille, directed by Marion Bierry, Théâtre de l'Œuvre
- 2000 : Le Chant du crapaud by Louis-Charles Sirjacq, directed by Julian Negulesco, Théâtre de Poche Montparnasse
- 2002 : L'Embrasement des Alpes by Peter Turrini, directed by Georges Werler, Théâtre de Poche Montparnasse
- 2003 : Coco Perdu by Louis Guilloux, directed by Stéphane Bierry, Théâtre de Poche Montparnasse
- 2005 : Sur un air de tango by Isabelle de Toledo, directed by Annick Blancheteau & Jean Mourière, Théâtre de Poche Montparnasse
- 2007 : L'Illusion comique by Corneille, directed by Marion Bierry, Théâtre de Poche Montparnasse, Théâtre Hébertot
- 2008 : Ivanov by Anton Chekov, directed by Philippe Adrien, Théâtre de la Tempête
- 2010 : Ivanov by Anton Chekov, directed by Philippe Adrien, Théâtre de la Tempête, tournée

=== Theater director ===
- 1960 : Les Radis creux by Jean Meckert, Théâtre de Poche Montparnasse
- 1975 : La Caverne d'Adullam by Jean-Jacques Varoujean, Théâtre de Poche Montparnasse
- 1976 : Les Moutons de la nuit by Denise Bonal, Théâtre de Poche Montparnasse
- 1976 : Isaac et la sage femme by Victor Haïm, Théâtre de Poche Montparnasse
- 1977 : Un ennemi du peuple by Henrik Ibsen, Théâtre Édouard VII
- 1977 : Sigismond by Jean-Jacques Tarbes, Théâtre de Poche Montparnasse
- 1980 : Une place au soleil by Georges Michel, Théâtre de Poche Montparnasse
- 1981 : Accordez vos violons by Victor Haïm, Théâtre de Poche Montparnasse
- 1981 : Le Butin by Joe Orton, Théâtre de Poche Montparnasse
- 1982 : Baron, Baronne by Jean-Jacques Varoujean, Théâtre de Poche Montparnasse
- 1982 : Souvenirs du faucon maltais by Jean-Pierre Enard, Théâtre de Poche Montparnasse
- 1982 : Flock by Sylvain Rougerie, Théâtre de Poche Montparnasse
- 1983 : Restaurant de nuit by Michel Bedetti, Théâtre de Poche Montparnasse
- 1984 : Le Pharaon by Geva Caban, Théâtre de Poche Montparnasse
- 1984 : Le Plaisir de l'amour by Robert Pouderou, Théâtre de Poche Montparnasse
- 1984 : Kidnapping by Catherine Rihoit, Théâtre de Poche Montparnasse
- 1985 : La Part du rêve by Michèle Ressi, Théâtre de Poche Montparnasse
- 1985 : L'Écornifleur by Jules Renard, Théâtre de Poche Montparnasse
- 1986 : Amédée, or How to Get Rid of It by Eugène Ionesco, Théâtre de Poche Montparnasse
- 1987 : Belle Famille by Victor Haïm, Théâtre de Poche Montparnasse
- 1988 : Krapp's Last Tape by Samuel Beckett, Théâtre de Poche Montparnasse
- 1988 : Le Plus Heureux des trois by Eugène Labiche, Théâtre de Poche Montparnasse
- 1991 : Abraham et Samuel by Victor Haïm
- 1991 : Les Empailleurs by Toni Leicester, Théâtre de Poche Montparnasse
- 1993 : La Fortune du pot by Jean-François Josselin, Théâtre de Poche Montparnasse
- 1996 : L'Argent du beurre by Louis-Charles Sirjacq, Théâtre de Poche Montparnasse
- 1998 : 4ème tournant by Josette Boulva and Marie Gatard, Théâtre de Poche Montparnasse
- 2002 : Les Directeurs by Daniel Besse, Théâtre de Poche Montparnasse
- 2007 : Les Riches reprennent confiance by Louis-Charles Sirjacq, Théâtre de Poche Montparnasse
- 2010 : Au nom du fils by Alain Cauchi, Théâtre de Poche Montparnasse
- Uncle Vanya by Anton Chekov
- Three Sisters by Anton Chekov
- Les Petits Bourgeois by Maxim Gorky
- La Vie de Galilée by Bertolt Brecht
- Tchin Tchin by François Billetdoux
- Chez Pierrot by Jean-Claude Grumberg
- L'Embrassement des Alpes by Peter Turrini

== Prizes and honours ==
- 2009 : Prix du Brigadier Brigadier d'honneur pour l'ensemble de sa carrière
