= Théâtre des Mathurins =

Theatre in Paris, France

- Théâtre de Monsieur (1910–1911); Nouveaux-Mathurins (1911–1912) théâtre Sacha-Guitry (1913–1920)
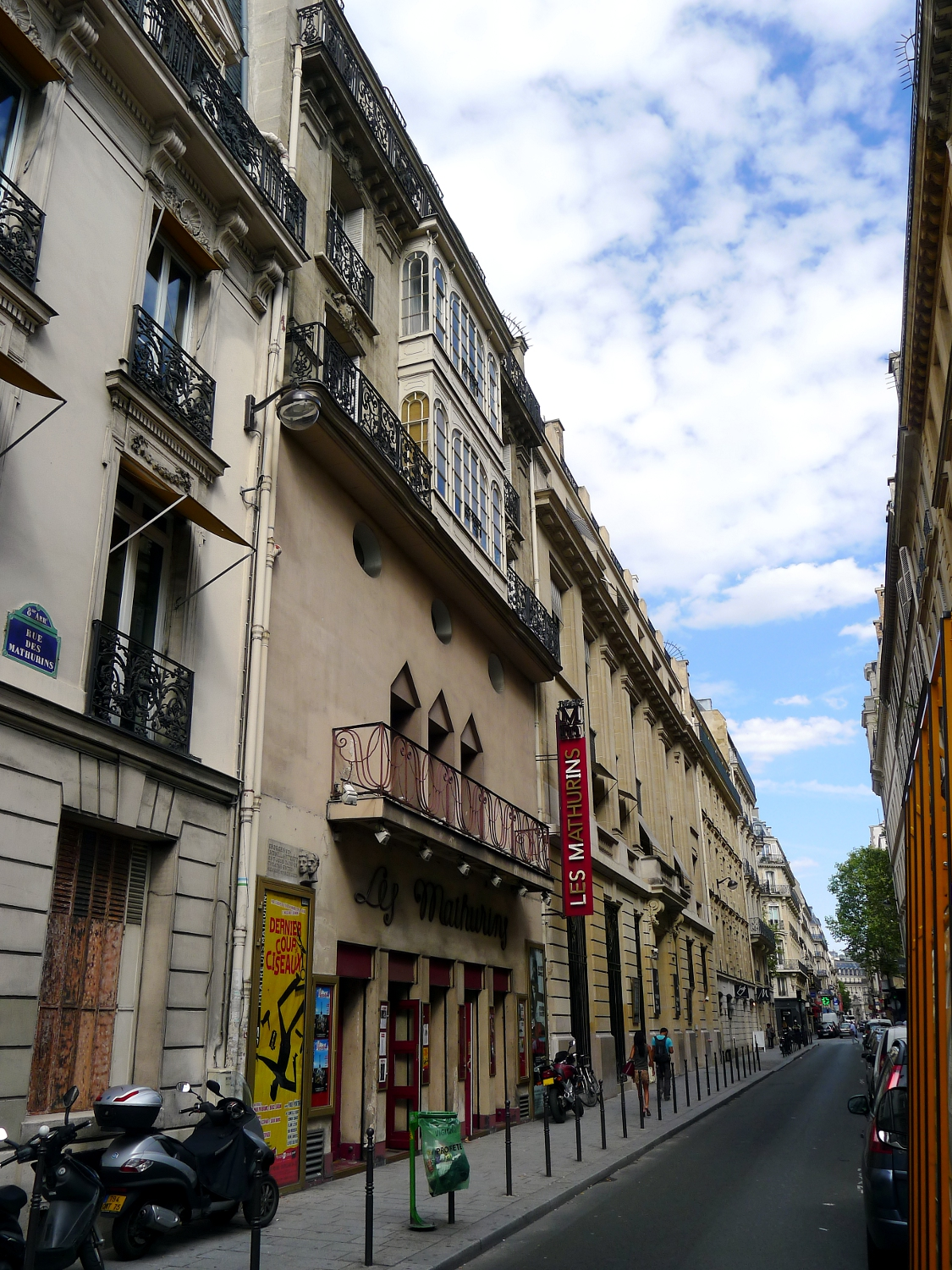
- Le théâtre des Mathurins, rue des Mathurins (Paris 8)
- Interactive map of Théâtre des Mathurins
- Address: Rue des Mathurins; Paris; France
- Coordinates: 48.873088°N 2.325861°E
- Capacity: 386
- Type: theatre

Construction
- Opened: 1898
- Architects: Salvan (1897); Rochet (1898); Charles Siclis (1922); Gumpel (1936)

Website
- www.theatredesmathurins.com

The théâtre des Mathurins (French pronunciation: [teɑtʁ de matyʁɛ̃]), also called Les Mathurins, is a Parisian theatre located at 36, rue des Mathurins, in the 8th arrondissement of Paris. It was established in 1897.

== Directions ==
- 1898–1901: Marguerite Deval
- 1901–1908: Jules Berny
- 1908: H. Mathonnet de Saint-Georges
- 1910–1911: théâtre de Monsieur
- 1911–1912: Nouveaux-Mathurins
- 1913–1919: Sacha Guitry (théâtre Sacha-Guitry)
- 1920: théâtre des Mathurins
- 1927–1929: René Saunier
- 1929–1934: Jean Sarrus
- 1934–1936: Jean Tedesco
- 1936–1939: Georges Pitoëff
- 1939–1953: Marcel Herrand and Jean Marchat
- 1953–1981: Rika Radifé
- 1981–1984: Henri de Menthon
- 1984–1997: Gérard Caillaud
- 1997–2000: Julien Vartet
- 2002–2006: Jean-Louis Livi and Bernard Murat
- 2006–2011: Daniel Colas and Yvan Varco
- Since 2011: Stéphane Engelberg, Louis-Michel Colla and Séverine Setbon

== Productions ==
Direction Marguerite Deval

- 1900: Le Beau Choréas, February
- 1900: La Petite Femme de Luth opéra burlesque by Tristan Bernard, November

Direction Jules Berny

- 1902: Le Page bluette in 1 act by Sacha Guitry, music Ludo Ratz, 15 April
- 1902: Victoires et conquêtes by Georges Courteline, 15 April
- 1905: La Rupture by Fernand Nozière, July
- 1905: Nono by Sacha Guitry, 6 December
- 1906: L'Infidèle by Georges de Porto-Riche
- 1906: Les Deux Courtisanes by Francis de Croisset, music Reynaldo Hahn, 10 October

Théâtre Sacha-Guitry

- 1919: Il était un petit Home by Henri Duvernois, 19 December
- 1920: La Danseuse éperdue by René Fauchois, 4 February
- 1920: La Femme fatale by André Birabeau, May
- 1920: Nono by Sacha Guitry, June

Théâtre des Mathurins

- 1921: La Huitième Femme de Barbe-Bleue by Alfred Savoir
- 1921: Les Deux Monsieur de Madame by Félix Gandéra, 7 October
- 1922: Le Pêcheur d'ombres by Jean Sarment, 16 January
- 1922: La Belle Poule by Marcel Nadaud, 2 February
- 1922: La Farce de Popa Ghéorghé by Adolphe Orna, directed by Gaston Baty,
- 1922: Martine by Jean-Jacques Bernard, directed by Gaston Baty,
- 1922: Intimité by Jean-Victor Pellerin, directed by Gaston Baty,
- 1923: La Huitième Femme de Barbe-Bleue by Alfred Savoir,
- 1923: Vertu by Alfred Savoir and Régis Gignoux
- 1924: Ce que femme veut by Alfred Savoir and Étienne Rey, directed by Charlotte Lysès, 5 January
- 1924: Akim by Victor Eftimiu, 6 February
- 1924: Le Chemin des écoliers by André Birabeau
- 1924: Ma femme danseuse by Louis Delluc, 18 October
- 1925: Boudu sauvé des eaux by René Fauchois, 30 March
- 1925: Au jardin de ma tante by Jacques Anger, 4 June
- 1925: Parce que de Jean Alley, 30 December
- 1926: Monsieur de Saint Obin by André Picard and Harold Marsh Harwood, 1 March
- 1926: Le Paradis perdu by Lucien Daudet and Edouard Ferras, 5 November

Direction René Saunier

- 1927: Baccara by René Saunier, directed by Jules Berry,
- Directed by Georges Pitoëff
  - 1927: Mixture by Henri-René Lenormand, 3 November
  - 1927: Hamlet by William Shakespeare, 11 November
  - 1928: La Maison des cœurs brisés by George Bernard Shaw, 17 January
  - 1928: Brand by Henrik Ibsen, 20 February
  - 1928: Ghosts by Henrik Ibsen, 14 March
  - 1928: La Célèbre Histoire by Saint-Georges de Bouhélier, 24 April
  - 1928: Adam, Ève et Cie by Balgi, 18 May
  - 1928: Mademoiselle Bourrat by Claude Anet, 4 June
  - 1928: Week-end by Noël Coward, 22 October

Direction Jean Sarrus

- 1931: Le Secret de William Selby by Georges Delance after Edgar Wallace, 16 May
- 1931: Fabienne by Jacques Natanson, 30 September
- 1932: Home chat (Quand on déraille) by Noël Coward, 16 January
- 1932: Prenez garde à la peinture by René Fauchois, 27 February
- 193 : La Voie lactée by Alfred Savoir, directed by Harry Baur, 26 January
- 1933: La Fuite en Égypte by Robert Spitzer
- 1933: Boudu sauvé des eaux by René Fauchois, 5 September
- 1933: Argent comptant by Yvan Noé and Jean Alley, 11 December
- 1934: Le mari que j'ai voulu by Louis Verneuil, February

Direction Jean Tedesco

- Directed by Georges Pitoëff
  - 1934: Ghosts by Henrik Ibsen, 8 June
  - 1934: The Wild Duck by Henrik Ibsen, 12 October
  - 1934: Le Chef by Drieu La Rochelle, 15 November
  - 1934: Saint Joan by George Bernard Shaw, 1 December
  - 1935: Hommage à Luigi Pirandello after Luigi Pirandello, 17 January
  - 1935: Ce soir on improvise by Luigi Pirandello, 19 January
  - 1935: La Créature by Ferdinand Bruckner, 30 April
  - 1935: Je vivrai un grand amour by Steve Passeur, 4 June
  - 1935: La Complainte de Pranzini et de Thérèse de Lisieux by Henri Ghéon, 28 June

Directed by Georges Pitoëff

- 1935: Je vivrai un grand amour by Steve Passeur, 14 October
- 1935: Le Héros et le soldat by George Bernard Shaw, 23 November
- 1936: Le Merveilleux Alliage by Vladimir Kirchon, 11 January
- 1936: La Folle du ciel by Henri-René Lenormand, 21 February
- 1936: Poucette by Charles Vildrac, 21 February
- 1936: Ghosts by Henrik Ibsen, 11 April
- 1936: Tu ne m'échapperas jamais by Margaret Kennedy, 14 May
- 1936: Dieu sait pourquoi ? by Steve Passeur
- 1936: Angelica by Léo Ferrero, 23 October
- 1936: Quand vous voudrez by Georges Duhamel, 23 October
- 1936: A Doll's House by Henrik Ibsen, 26 November
- 1937: Six Characters in Search of an Author by Luigi Pirandello, 4 January
- 1937: Le Voyageur sans bagage by Jean Anouilh, 17 February
- 1937: Amal et la lettre du roi by Rabindranath Tagore, translation by André Gide, music by Darius Milhaud, 17 February
- 1937: Lapointe et Ropiteau by Georges Duhamel, 30 April
- 1937: Romeo and Juliet by William Shakespeare, 11 June
- 1937: Ève by Jean Yole, 2 July
- 1937: Kirika by Georges Ciprian, 16 July
- 1937: Des abeilles sur le pont supérieur by John Boynton Priestley, 14 September
- 1937: He Who Gets Slapped by Leonid Andreyev, 7 October
- 1937: L'Échange by Paul Claudel, 17 November
- 1938: La Sauvage by Jean Anouilh, 12 January
- 1938: L'argent n'a pas d'odeur by George Bernard Shaw, 16 September
- 1938: La Première Famille by Jules Supervielle, 16 September
- 1938: Là-bas by Titaÿna, 3 November
- 1938: La Fenêtre ouverte by Maurice Martin du Gard, 10 December
- 1939: The Seagull by Anton Chekhov
- 1939: An Enemy of the People by Henrik Ibsen, 18 May
- 1939: The Lady of the Camellias by Alexandre Dumas fils

Direction Marcel Herrand and Jean Marchat

- 1941: Le pavillon brûle by Steve Passeur
- 1941: La Fille du jardinier by Charles Exbrayat
- 1942: D'après nature ou presque by Michel Arnaud, directed by Marcel Herrand, 24 April
- 1942: Dieu est innocent by Lucien Fabre, directed by Marcel Herrand, 1 July
- 1942: Deirdre des douleurs by John Millington Synge, directed by Marcel Herrand
- 1942: Mademoiselle de Panama by Marcel Achard, directed by Marcel Herrand
- 1943: The Master Builder by Henrik Ibsen, directed by Marcel Herrand
- 1943: Le Voyage de Thésée by Georges Neveux, directed by Jean Marchat
- 1944: Le Malentendu by Albert Camus, directed by Marcel Herrand, 24 June
- 1945: Tartuffe by Molière, directed by Marcel Herrand, January
- 1945: Le Treizième Arbre by André Gide, directed by Marcel Herrand, January
- 1945: Federigo by René Laporte, directed by Marcel Herrand, 3 March
- 1945: Rosiers blancs by Simone Le Bargy, directed by Marcel Herrand, March
- 1946: Divines Paroles by Ramón María del Valle-Inclán, directed by Marcel Herrand, 12 February
- 1946: Primavera by Claude Spaak, directed by Marcel Herrand, June
- 1946: L’Extravagant Captain Smith by Jean Blanchon, directed by Marcel Herrand, October
- 1946: Lord Arthur Savile's Crime by Saint John Legh Clowes after Oscar Wilde, directed by Marcel Herrand, December
- 1947: Morts sans sépulture and The Respectful Prostitute by Jean-Paul Sartre, directed by Michel Vitold, March
- 1947: La Parisienne by Henry Becque, directed by Julien Bertheau, April
- 1947: Le Misanthrope by Molière, directed by Jean Marchat, October
- 1947: L'Empereur de Chine by Jean-Pierre Aumont, directed by Marcel Herrand, November
- 1947: L'Île de la raison by Marivaux, directed by Marcel Herrand
- 1947: Je vivrai un grand amour by Steve Passeur
- 1948: Le Bout de la route by Jean Giono, directed by Georges Vandéric, March
- 1948: Montserrat by Emmanuel Roblès, directed by Georges Vandéric, September
- 1948: N’empêchez pas la musique by Fabien Reignier, directed by Jean Marchat, December
- 1949: Deathwatch by Jean Genet, directed by Jean Marchat, 26 February
- 1949: Le Roi est mort by Louis Ducreux,
- 1949: Amal et la lettre du Roi by Rabindranath Tagore, translation by André Gide, directed by Jean Marchat, June
- 1949: Le Retour de l'enfant prodigue by André Gide, directed by Jean Marchat, June
- 1949: Britannicus by Racine, directed by Jean Marchat, October
- 1949: Héloïse et Abélard by Roger Vailland, directed by Jean Marchat, December
- 1950: Le Bal du Lieutenant Helt by Gabriel Arout, directed by Marcel Herrand,
- 1951: L’Héritière by Ruth Goetz and Augustus Goetz play in two acts and 7 tableaux after a short story by Henry James, adaptation Louis Ducreux, directed by Marcel Herrand, 9 May

Direction Rika Radifé

- 1953: L’homme qui a perdu son ombre by Adelbert von Chamisso,
- 1953: The life I gave you by Luigi Pirandello, directed by Claude Régy,
- 1954: Si vous aimez ceux qui vous aiment by Claude Baldy, directed by Jean Marchat, March
- 1954: La Découverte du nouveau monde by Morvan Lebesque, directed by Hubert Gignoux, June
- 1954: Le Maître et la servante by Henri Lefebvre, directed by Jean Marchat, September
- 1954: Portrait de famille by Nino Frank and Paul Gilson, directed by Claude Régy, 30 October
- 1954: Électre or La chute des masques by Marguerite Yourcenar, December
- 1955: L'Étourdi by Molière, directed by Henry Mary, February
- 1955: The Merchant of Venice de William Shakespeare, directed by Hubert Gignoux, March
- 1955: Pour le meilleur et le pire by Clifford Odets, directed by Raymond Rouleau, 21 April
- 1956: La Tour de Nesle by Frédéric Gaillardet after Alexandre Dumas, directed by Jean Le Poulain, March
- 1956: Le Capitaine Fanfaron by Bernard Zimmer after Plautus, directed by Henri Soubeyran, May
- 1956: Requiem for a Nun by William Faulkner, adaptation and mise en scène Albert Camus, 20 September
- 1957: Mademoiselle Fanny by Georgette Paul and Gabriel Arout after Pierre Veber, directed by Jean Mercure, 15 January
- 1958: Look Back in Anger by John Osborne, directed by Raymond Gérôme, 23 April
- 1958: Le Bal du lieutenant Helt by Gabriel Arout, directed by Raymond Gérôme
- 1959: Le Prince de Papier by Jean Davray, directed by Jacques Charon,
- 1959: Connaissez-vous la voie lactée ? by Karl Wittlinger, directed by Michel de Ré, February
- 1959: Les Écrivains de Michel de Saint Pierre and Pierre de Calan, directed by Raymond Gérôme, 22 September
- 1960: the Killer by Eugène Ionesco, directed by José Quaglio,
- 1960: Le Comportement des époux Bredburry de François Billetdoux, directed by the l'author, 2 December
- 1960: A Taste of Honey by Shelagh Delaney, adaptation Gabriel Arout and Françoise Mallet-Joris, directed by Marguerite Jamois, 12 February
- 1961: The Aspern Papers by Michael Redgrave after Henry James, adaptation Marguerite Duras, Robert Antelme, directed by Raymond Rouleau, 1 February
- 1961: Le Square by Marguerite Duras, directed by José Quaglio, 13 May
- 1961: Requiem for a Nun de William Faulkner, adaptation and mise en scène Albert Camus, 20 septembre
- 1961: Noir sur blanc de Brice Parain, directed by Raymond Gérôme, 14 décembre
- 1962: Les femmes aussi ont perdu la guerre by Curzio Malaparte, directed by Raymond Gérôme, 17 septembre
- 1962: Diary of a Madman by Gogol, directed by Roger Coggio and François Perrot, 17 November
- 1963: Léonora ou les dangers de la vertu by Marcel Jouhandeau, directed by Raymond Gérôme, January
- 1963: Fils de personne by Henry de Montherlant, directed by Henri Rollan, 28 September
- 1963: L’Embroc by Henry de Montherlant, directed by Henri Rollan], 28 September
- 1963: La Ville dont le prince est un enfant by Henry de Montherlant, directed by Henri Rollan, 28 September
- 1963: Le Petit Prince by Saint-Exupéry,
- 1964: Ballade pour un futur by Félix Lützkendorf, directed by Jean-Paul Cisife, February
- 1964: Césaire by Jean Schlumberger, directed by Jean-Paul Cisife, 9 April
- 1964: Les Yeux de dix-huit ans by Jean Schlumberger, directed by Jean-Paul Cisife, 9 April
- 1964: Le Marchand de cercueils by Jean Schlumberger, directed by Jean-Paul Cisife, 9 April
- 1964: Le Chant du cygne by Anton Chekhov, 9 June
- 1964: Spectacle de poèmes by Aragon, Ronsard, Raymond Queneau, Jules Supervielle, Jean Genet told by Hélène Martin, June
- 1964: The Wings of the Dove by Christopher Taylor after Henry James, directed by Michel Fagadau, 26 September
- 1965: L'Accusateur public by Fritz Hochwälder, directed by Claude Régy, 8 March
- 1965: Le Plus Heureux des trois by Eugène Labiche, directed by Yves Gasc, 13 September
- 1965: Suddenly, Last Summer by Tennessee Williams, directed by Jean Danet, 10 November
- 1965: The Respectful Prostitute by Jean-Paul Sartre, directed by Jean Danet, 10 November
- 1966: Electra by Sophocles, adaptation Maurice Clavel, directed by Silvia Monfort, 20 February
- 1966: Le Grand Cérémonial by Fernando Arrabal, directed by Georges Vitaly, 15 March
- 1966: Témoignage irrecevable by John Osborne, directed by Claude Régy, 24 September
- 1966: Dutchman by LeRoi Jones, directed by Antoine Bourseiller,
- 1967: Danse lente sur un champ de bataille after William Hanley, directed by Jean Tasso and Gilles Segal, 8 April
- 1967: Noir sur blanc by Brice Parain, directed by Raymond Rouleau,
- 1968: Le Gadget by Alexandre Rivemale, directed by Henri Labussière, 27 January
- 1968: La Terre étrangère by Jean-François Różan, directed by Jacques Ardouin, 27 April
- 1968: Changement à vue by Loleh Bellon, directed by Yves Bureau,
- 1968: M. Le Modéré by Arthur Adamov, directed by André Steiger, 25 September
- 1968: Dialogues d'exilés by Bertolt Brecht, directed by Tania Balachova, 26 November
- 1969: Chantage au théâtre by Dacia Maraini, directed by André Téchiné, 14 February
- 1969: Pour Karine by Arieh Chen, directed by Jacques Mauclair, March
- 1969: Quelque chose comme Glenariff by Danièle Lord and Henri Garcin, directed by Henri Garcin, 30 September
- 1969: Suzanna Andler de Marguerite Duras, directed by Tania Balachova, 6 December
- 1970: The life I gave you by Pirandello, directed by Pierre Franck, March
- 1970: Alice dans les jardins du Luxembourg by Romain Weingarten, directed by the author, 24 September
- 1971: Dieu aboie-t-il ? (ou Adorable Pucelle) by François Boyer, directed by Jean Négroni, 6 February
- 1971: Partage de midi by Paul Claudel, directed by André Oumansky, October
- 1972: Play Strindberg by Friedrich Dürrenmatt, directed by Yves Gasc, 26 September
- 1973: Les Femmes au pouvoir by Élie-Georges Berreby, directed by Christian Chevreuse, 22 February
- 1973: Le Voyageur sans bagage by Jean Anouilh, directed by Nicole Anouilh,
- 1974: Le Péril bleu ou Méfiez-vous des autobus by Victor Lanoux, directed by the author, 1 October
- 1975: Antigone by Jean Anouilh, directed by Nicole Anouilh, 18 September
- 1976: Rosencrantz and Guildenstern Are Dead by Tom Stoppard, directed by Jean-François Prévand, 13 April
- 1977: La Ville dont le prince est un enfant by Henry de Montherlant, directed by Jean Meyer, 20 September
- 1978: La Vie en V.O., conception Alex Métayer, 27 September
- 1978: Changement à vue by Loleh Bellon, directed by Yves Bureau, 23 November
- 1979: Danse toujours, tu m'intéresses by Claude Mann, directed by the author,
- 1980: Dialogue d'une prostituée avec son client by Dacia Maraini, directed by Ève Bonfanti and Micheline Hardy,
- 1980: Proust ou la Passion d'être after Marcel Proust, directed by Daniel Benoin, 2 October

Direction Henri de Menthon

- 1981: No Exit by Jean-Paul Sartre, directed by Georges Wilson,
- 1981: Pétition by Václav Havel, directed by Stephan Meldegg,
- 1981: Jacques et son maître by Milan Kundera, directed by Georges Werler, 29 September
- 1981: Le Grain de sable by Jean-Pierre Bacri, directed by Jean-Pierre Bouvier, 15 December
- 1982: Emballage perdu by Véra Feyder, directed by Nelly Borgeaud, 3 June
- 1982: L'Avantage d'être constant by Oscar Wilde, directed by Pierre Boutron,
- 1983: Le Bonheur à Romorantin by Jean-Claude Brisville, directed by Andréas Voutsinas, 14 November

Direction Gérard Caillaud

- 1984: La Dernière Classe by Brian Friel, directed by Jean-Claude Amyl, 13 septembre
- 1984: Attention à la petite marche by Christiane Lasquin, directed by Daniel Ivernel, Studio des Mathurins, 28 septembre
- 1984: Poésie nue after François Rabelais, Léo Ferré, Charles Baudelaire, Louis-Ferdinand Céline, Alfred de Musset, Paul Valéry, Arthur Rimbaud, Victor Hugo, Paul Verlaine, Rutebeuf, Jacques Prévert, Stéphane Mallarmé, conception Pierre Lafont, Studio des Mathurins, 8 October
- 1984: Meli-meloman 2, conception Maurice Baquet, Studio des Mathurins, November
- 1984: Louki, que, quoi, dont, où by Pierre Louki, conception Pierre Louki, 3 December
- 1985: Un drôle de cadeau by Jean Bouchaud, directed by the author, January
- 1985: Les Fantasmes du boucher by Victor Haïm, directed by the author, Studio des Mathurins, 4 February
- 1985: Les Mystères du confessionnal by Pierre Lamy and Louis Hamon, directed by Pierre Lamy, Studio des Mathurins, 1 August
- 1985: Rififoin dans les labours by Christian Dob, directed by the author, November
- 1986: Le Résident by Sławomir Mrożek, directed by Georges Werler, 24 January
- 1986: Les Petits Oiseaux by Eugène Labiche and Alfred Delacour and Mon Isménie by Eugène Labiche and Marc-Michel, directed by Philippe Rondest, May
- 1986: Partage de midi by Paul Claudel, directed by Andonis Vouyoucas, 8 May
- 1986: Mon Isménie by Eugène Labiche and Marc-Michel, directed by Philippe Rondest, 19 September
- 1986: Dernier Rempart by Sławomir Mrożek, directed by Georges Werler,
- 1987: The Idiot after Fyodor Dostoyevsky, directed by Jacques Mauclair, 20 September
- 1988: Monsieur Vénus after Rachilde, directed by Pierre Spivakoff, 15 January
- 1988: Rosel by Harald Müller, directed by Christian Schiaretti, 11 March
- 1988: Douce Nuit by Harald Müller, directed by Alain Alexis Barsacq, 11 March
- 1988: Un éléphant dans le jardin by Éric Westphal, directed by José Paul, Petits Mathurins
- 1988: Une vie de théâtre by David Mamet, adaptation Pierre Laville, directed by Michel Piccoli,
- 1988: Le Minotaure by Marcel Aymé, mise en scène José Paul, Petits Mathurins, September
- 1988: La Femme à contre-jour by Éric Naggar, directed by Jean Rochefort, 29 September
- 1989: L'Aiglon by Edmond Rostand, directed by Anne Delbée, 25 April
- 1989: Les Palmes de monsieur Schutz by Jean-Noël Fenwick, directed by Gérard Caillaud, 18 September
- 1990: La Confession de Rousseau by Roger Vrigny, directed by Gérard Caillaud, Petits Mathurins, 9 October
- 1991: Gustave et Louise de Pierre Barillet after the correspondence between Gustave Flaubert and Louise Colet, directed by Gérard Caillaud, Petits Mathurins, 1 February
- 1991: Magic Palace by Pierre Barillet and Jean-Pierre Gredy, directed by Gérard Caillaud, 24 September
- 1991: Charlus by Jean-Louis Curtis, directed by Philippe Rondest, Petits Mathurins, 22 October
- 1992: Caligula by Albert Camus, directed by Jacques Rosny,
- 1992: Nocturne à Nohant by Dominique Paquet after George Sand, directed by Hervé Van Der Meulen, 6 October
- 1993: En attendant les bœufs by Christian Dob, directed by Gérard Caillaud, 8 June
- 1993: Les Lunatiques by Christian Giudicelli, directed by Philippe Rondest, Petits Mathurins, 26 October
- 1994: Ce qui arrive et ce qu'on attend by Jean-Marie Besset, directed by Patrice Kerbrat, 28 January
- 1994: Les Palmes de Monsieur Schutz by Jean-Noël Fenwick, directed by Gérard Caillaud, 20 May
- 1994: Les Palmes de monsieur Schutz by Jean-Noël Fenwick, directed by Gérard Caillaud, 13 September
- 1994: L'oiseau n'a plus d'ailes after Peter Schwiefert, directed by François Duval, Petits Mathurins, 22 September
- 1995: Un jeune homme de 300 ans after Jean de La Fontaine, directed by Philippe Lejour, 24 January
- 1995: Sacré Nostradamus ! by Jean Dell, directed by Gérard Caillaud, 22 September
- 1996: Cinéma parlant by Julien Vartet, directed by Daniel Colas, 12 March
- 1996: Archibald by Julien Vartet, directed by Daniel Colas, 21 May
- 1996: Le Boxeur et la Violoniste by Bernard Da Costa, directed by Didier Long, 9 August
- 1996: Monsieur Malaussène au théâtre after Daniel Pennac, directed by Daniel Pennac and Jean Guerrin, 14 November

Direction Julien Vartet

- 1997: Grison IV by Julien Vartet, directed by Gérard Savoisien, 7 February
- 1997: Cœur de laitue by Stéphanie Tesson, directed by the author, Petits Mathurins, 8 October
- 1997: Ce que femme veut... by Julien Vartet, directed by Raymond Acquaviva, 19 December
- 1998: Archibald by Julien Vartet, directed by the author, 28 May
- 1998: La Frousse by Julien Vartet, directed by the author, Petits Mathurins, 6 November

Direction Bernard Murat and Jean-Louis Livi

- 2002: Duel, conception Agnès Boury, Laurent Cirade, Paul Staïcu, directed by Agnès Boury, 4 juin
- 2002: Tours et détours (On en a brulé pour moins que ça), conception Élisabeth Amato, 27 août
- 2002: La Preuve by David Auburn, directed by Bernard Murat, 8 October
- 2003: La Femme Coquelicot after Noëlle Châtelet, directed by Yann le Gouic, Petits Mathurins, 5 February
- 2003: Pierre et Papillon by Murielle Magellan, directed by Christophe Luthringer, Petits Mathurins, 12 February
- 2003: La Parisienne by Henry Becque, directed by Bernard Murat, 2 September
- 2003: Les Athlètes dans leur tête by Paul Fournel, directed by André Dussollier, 23 September
- 2003: Préliminaires de Daniel Cohen, directed by the author, Petits Mathurins, 24 September
- 2004: L'Invité by David Pharao, directed by Jean-Luc Moreau, January
- 2004: La Rafle du Vel d'Hiv after Maurice Rajsfus, directed by Philippe Ogouz and Frédéric de Rougemont, Petits Mathurins, 7 September
- 2004: L'Autre by Florian Zeller, directed by Annick Blancheteau, Petits Mathurins, 14 September
- 2004: Traits d'union by Murielle Magellan, directed by Bernard Murat, 17 septembre
- 2004: Fans, je vous aime ! by Pierre Palmade, Henri Mitton, Jean-Loup Dabadie, Sylvie Joly, directed by Bruno Agati, Alex Lutz, 28 September
- 2004: Et en plus, c'est vrai ! by Frédéric Martin, directed by Yves Pignot, 2 November
- 2005: A story pour les gens qui believe in dreams by Éric Théobald, François-Xavier Demaison, Samuel Le Bihan, Mickaël Quiroga, directed by Éric Théobald, 1 March
- 2005: Mémoires d'un tricheur by Sacha Guitry, directed by Francis Huster, 30 March
- 2005: Une heure et demie de retard by Gérald Sibleyras, directed by Bernard Murat, 6 September
- 2005: La Cerise sur le gâteau one-woman show by Sylvie Joly, directed by Alex Lutz, 13 September
- 2005: La Conversion de la cigogne by Trinidad, directed by the author, 20 September

Direction Daniel Colas et Yvan Varco

- 2006: Dieu habite Düsseldorf by Sébastien Thiéry, directed by Christophe Lidon, 23 February
- 2006: Le Vieux Juif blonde by Amanda Sthers, directed by Jacques Weber, 8 March
- 2006: Mémoires d'un tricheur by Sacha Guitry, directed by Francis Huster, 7 April
- 2006: Atrocement vôtre by Daniel Colas, directed by the author, 4 July
- 2006: Le Jardin by Brigitte Buc, directed by Jean Bouchaud, 5 September
- 2006: La Sœur de Jerry King by Jack Neary, directed by Arnaud Lemort, Petits Mathurins, 22 September
- 2006: Divins Divans by Eva Darlan and Sophie Daquin, directed by Jean-Paul Muel, 24 October
- 2006: L'Apprenti magicien, conception Sébastien Mossière, 25 October
- 2007: Eva by Nicolas Bedos, directed by Daniel Colas, 23 January
- 2007: Imagine-toi by Julien Cottereau, directed by Erwan Daouphars, 30 January
- 2007: Les Mauvaises by Patricia Clément and Martine Thinières, directed by the authors, Petits Mathurins, 9 May
- 2007: Clémence Massart aux Mathurins ! : •Que je t'aime – Courrier du cœur – La Vieille au bois dormant, conception Clémence Massart, 22 May
- 2007: Prime Time by Agathe Philippe and Philippe Dumond, directed by Marie-Madeleine Burguet, 31 May
- 2007: Check-up by Serge Serout, directed by Daniel Colas, Petits Mathurins, 8 June
- 2007: Les Chaussettes Opus 124 by Daniel Colas, directed by the author, 18 September
- 2007: Le Molière imaginaire by Yvan Varco and Jean-Michel Bériat, directed by Roger Louret, 9 October
- 2007: Laisse flotter les rubans de Jacqueline de Romilly, directed by Philippe Rondest, 21 October
- 2007: L'Apprenti magicien, conception Sébastien Mossière, 24 October
- 2007: Champagne pour tout le monde by Serge Serout, directed by Daniel Colas, Petits Mathurins, 31 October
- 2008: Le Jeu de la vérité 2 by Philippe Lellouche, directed by Philippe Lellouche and Morgan Spillemaecker, 18 January
- 2008: Réception by Serge Valletti, directed by Christophe Correia, 25 January
- 2008: Ne nous quitte pas by Gil Galliot and Yves Hirschfeld, directed by Gil Galliot, 29 January
- 2008: Confidences de Florence d'Azémar, directed by Emmanuel de Sablet, Petits Mathurins, 1 February
- 2008: La Fiancée du magicien de Sébastien Mossière, directed by the author, 12 April
- 2008: Charles Gonzalès devient Camille Claudel by Charles Gonzalès, Petits Mathurins, 22 April
- 2008: Sophie Mounicot, c'est mon tour ! by Gérald Sibleyras, François Rollin and Sophie Mounicot, directed by Roland Marchisio, Petits Mathurins, 14 May
- 2008: Tonton Léon story by Serge Serout, directed by Daniel Colas, 28 May
- 2008: Bains de minuit by Jack William Sloane, directed by Daniel Colas, 5 September
- 2008: Charles Gonzalès devient Camille Claudel by Charles Gonzalès, 9 September
- 2008: Sur la vie... d'ma mère by Daniel Saint-Hamont, Petits Mathurins, 9 September
- 2008: L'Ombre orchestre by Xavier Mortimer, directed by Jean-Paul Rollin, 14 September
- 2008: Sophie Mounicot, c'est mon tour ! by Gérald Sibleyras, François Rollin and Sophie Mounicot, directed by Roland Marchisio, Petits Mathurins, 17 September
- 2008: Les Bidochon by Christian Binet, directed by Jean-Luc Borras, 15 November
- 2008: The Magic Flute by Mozart, Jean-Hervé Appéré, Gil Coudène, directed by Jean-Hervé Appéré, 15 November
- 2009: Saleté de Robert Schneider, directed by Hans Peter Cloos, Petits Mathurins, 14 janvier
- 2009: The Postman Always Rings Twice by James M. Cain, directed by Daniel Colas, 30 January
- 2009: À voir absolument ! by Frédéric Tokarz, directed by Nicolas Lartigue, 20 March
- 2009: Zimmer de Olivier Benyahya, directed by Vanessa Mikowski, Petits Mathurins, 31 May
- 2009: L'Odyssée de ta race by Rachida Khalil, directed by Géraldine Bourgue and Rachida Khalil, 16 June
- 2009: Collections by Richard Hervé, directed by Xavier Gallais, Petits Mathurins, 19 September
- 2009: Les Autres : Michu – Les Vacances – Rixe by Jean-Claude Grumberg, directed by Daniel Colas, 18 September
- 2009: Grasse Matinée by René de Obaldia, directed by Thomas Le Douarec, Petits Mathurins, 9 September
- 2009: Charlotte Corday by Daniel Colas, directed by the author, 23 October
- 2009: La Fée aux gros yeux by George Sand, directed by Aude Crouzatier, 24 October
- 2010: Ce soir j'ovule by Carlotta Clerici, directed by Nadine Trintignant, Petits Mathurins, 13 January
- 2010: Fever by Wallace Shawn, directed by Lars Norén, 13 January
- 2010: Journal d'un curé de campagne by Georges Bernanos, with Maxime d'Aboville, Petits Mathurins, 19 January
- 2010: Une heure trois quarts avant les huissiers ! by Serge Serout, directed by Daniel Colas, 11 June
- 2010: Le Vieux Juif blonde by Amanda Sthers, directed by Christophe Lidon, Petits Mathurins, 17 September
- 2010: Ce soir j'ovule by Carlotta Clerici, directed by Nadine Trintignant, 21 September
- 2010: La Douceur du velours by Christine Reverho, directed by Panchika Velez, 24 September
- 2010: Henri IV, le bien aimé by Daniel Colas, directed by the author, 22 October
- 2010: Padam padam, 1 December

Direction Stéphane Engelberg, Louis-Michel Colla and Séverine Setbon

- 2011: Appelez-moi Tennessee by Benoît Solès, directed by Gilbert Pascal, Petits Mathurins, 14 January
- 2011: Psy cause(s) by Josiane Pinson, directed by Daniel Berlioux, Petits Mathurins, 18 January
- 2011: Le Temps qui passe by Karine Silla-Pérez, directed by Vincent Pérez, 10 March
- 2011: Letter from an Unknown Woman by Stefan Zweig, directed by Christophe Lidon, Petits Mathurins, 15 April
- 2011: Une femme à Berlin after an anonymous text, directed by Tatiana Vialle, 3 May
- 2011: Laurent Lafitte, comme son nom l'indique, one-man-show cowritten and directed by Laurent Lafitte and Cyrille Thouvenin, 5 May
- 2011: Sainte Thérèse de Lisieux, histoire d'une âme by Michel Pascal after Thérèse of Lisieux, directed by Michel Pascal, 10 May
- 2011: Dernier coup de ciseaux by Marylin Abrams, Bruce Jordan, Paul Pörtner, directed by Sébastien Azzopardi and Sacha Danino, 7 June
- 2011: The Plague after Albert Camus, adaptation and mise en scène Francis Huster, 16 August
- 2011: Anatole by Kyan Khojandi, Bruno Muschio, directed by François Delaive, 31 August
- 2011: Fume cette cigarette by Emmanuel Robert-Espalieu, directed by Édouard Molinaro, 1 September
- 2011: Annabelle M, une histoire sans faim by Sandie Masson, directed by Agnès Boury, 11 September
- 2011: Comedy Gospel de Claudia Tagbo, directed by Fabrice Eboué, 18 September
- 2011: Abraham, written, directed and performed by Michel Jonasz, 2 October
- 2015: Poésie?, performed by Fabrice Luchini
- 2015: Au Pays du Père Noël, written and directed by Olivier Solivérès

== See also ==
- List of theatres and entertainment venues in Paris
