= Hélène Seuzaret =

French actress

Hélène Seuzaret (12 July 1976) is a French actress.

== Career ==
After graduating in law, Hélène Seuzaret first took classes at the Ligue d'Improvisation Lyonnaise, then trained in dramatic art with Claude Mathieu in Paris. She began by performing classical repertoire (Le malade imaginaire, Les caprices de Marianne) and contemporary plays.

Her first roles gave her the opportunity to meet Gérard Jugnot (État Critique) and Didier Caron.

She played with Gérard Lanvin, Gérard Darmon and Jacques Villeret in the crime comedy "Les Parrains", then played the curator in the medium-length film Van Gogh: Brush with Genius .

In 2008, Hélène Seuzaret starred in La lance de la destinée, a fantasy thriller with Jacques Weber. The following year, the actress reunited with her partner in Les héritières. She played a deported Jewish woman in "Un village français". She then played in the spy series "No Limit", in Richelieu, la pourpre et le sang, in The Big Everything and, in 2016, in season 4 of Caïn.

She then played in series such as Meurtres en pays d'Oléron, Au-delà des apparences (with Helena Noguerra) and Le Pont des Oubliés. She then played the role of the police lieutenant in the police comedy Le crime lui va si bien, with Claudia Tagbo.

== Filmography ==
=== Film ===
| Year | Title | Role | Directors |
|---|---|---|---|
| 2005 | Les Parrains | Nathalie | Frédéric Forestier |
| 2009 | Van Gogh: Brush with Genius | The curator | François Bertrand |
| 2011 | Au bistro du coin | Sofia | Charles Nemes |
| 2012 | Une nuit | Danièle Weiss | Philippe Lefebvre |
| 2012 | The Players | Isabelle | Emmanuelle Bercot, Fred Cavayé, Alexandre Courtès, Jean Dujardin, Michel Hazanavicius, Éric Lartigau and Gilles Lellouche |
| 2015 | The Big Everything | Ariane | Nicolas Bazz |
| 2021 | Goliath | | Frédéric Tellier |

=== Television ===
| Year | Title | Role | Notes |
|---|---|---|---|
| 2010-2012 | Un village français | Mme Crémieux | TV series |
| 2012-2013 | No Limit | Alexandra | Created by Luc Besson |
| 2018 | Das Boot | Jacqueline Rossignol | 2 episodes |
| 2019-2020 | Le crime lui va si bien | Céline Richer | TV series |
| 2021 | J'ai menti | Catherine Inuretta | TV miniseries |

=== Theatre ===
| Year | Title | Role | Notes |
|---|---|---|---|
| 2002-2003 | État critique | Adèle | Comedy by Michel Lengliney with Gérard Jugnot |
| 2008 | Les Révérends | Révérend Burton | Directed by Georges Werler |
| 2008 | The Imaginary Invalid | Béline | Directed by Georges Werler |
| 2017 | Rupture à domicile | Gaëlle | A comedy by and directed by Tristan Petitgirard |

== Awards ==
- Nominated for the Best Female Newcomer at the Molière Award 2002.
