= Michel Dubois =

Michel Dubois may refer to:

- Alexis Smirnoff (1947–2019), Canadian professional wrestler, also known as Michel "Justice" Dubois
- Michel Dubois (1937–2021), French theatre director and actor.
- Michel Dubois (ice hockey) (born 1954), Canadian ice hockey player
