= Ludmilla Pitoëff =

Russian actress

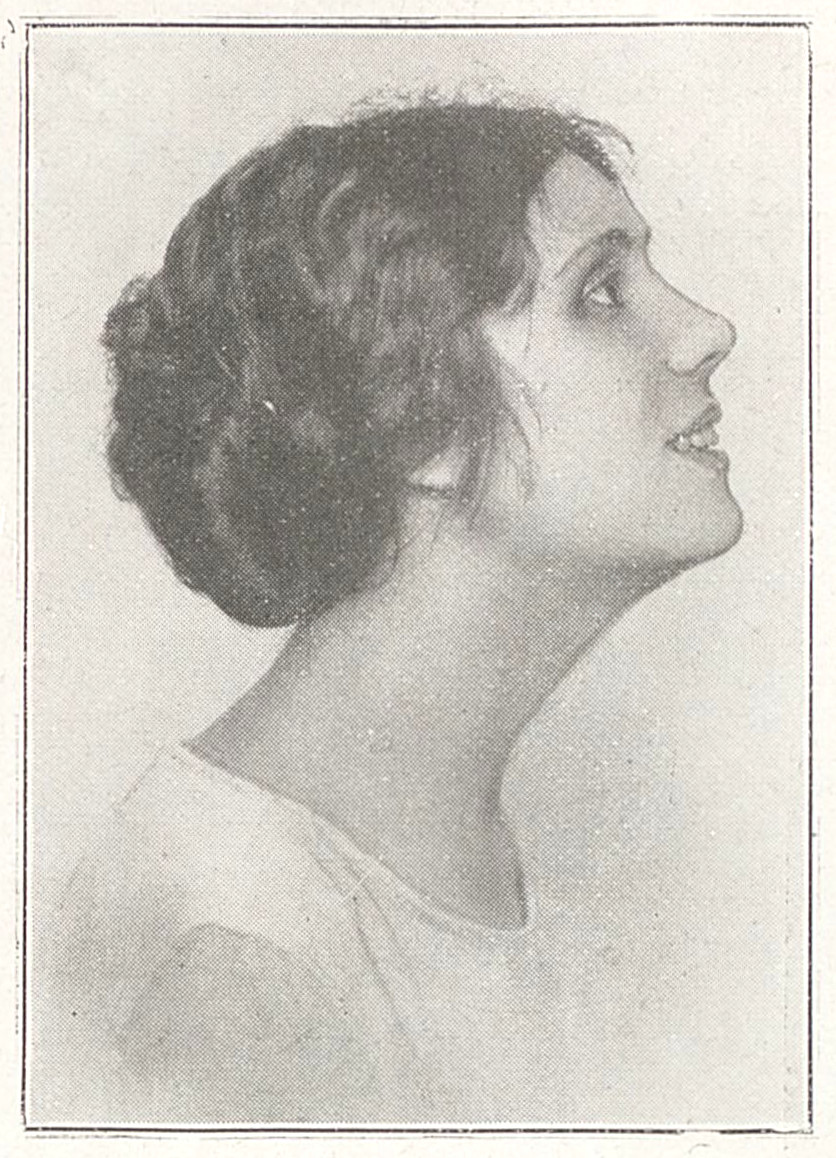
- Pitoëff in 1920
- Born: Ludmilla Iakovlevna Smanova; Tiflis, Tiflis Governorate, Russian Empire (now Tbilisi, Georgia)
- Occupation: Actress
- Spouse: Georges Pitoëff (m. 1915)
- Children: 7, including Sacha

Ludmilla Iakovlevna Pitoeva (Russian: Людмила Яковлевна Питоева, romanized: Lyudmila Yakovlevna Pitoyeva, née Smanova; 25 December 1896 – 15 September 1951), known as Ludmilla Pitoëff, was a Russian-French stage actress whose career was mainly in the theatres of Paris. She also appeared in London and New York, as well as in some films. She was the wife of actor-director Georges Pitoëff, and the mother of actor Sacha Pitoëff.

== Early life ==
Pitoëff was born in Tiflis in the Russian Empire (now Tbilisi, Georgia) on 25 December 1896 as Ludmila Iakovlevna Smanova. Her Russian father was an official for the Tsarist government. After finishing her studies, Smanova and her mother moved to Paris in April 1914, where she unsuccessfully auditioned for the Conservatoire national supérieur d'art dramatique. Shortly thereafter, she met her future husband Georges Pitoëff, a fellow expatriate from Tiflis. The two married in July 1915.

== Career ==
Pitoëff made her stage debut in Geneva in 1915, where her husband was director of a small theatre. The Pitoëffs returned to Paris in 1919. She appeared at venues in Paris including the Théâtre des Arts, the Théâtre des Champs-Elysées, the Théâtre du Vieux-Colombier, and the Théâtre des Mathurins. Among her stage appearances were Au Seuil du royaume (On the Threshold of the Kingdom, 1924), La Puissance des tenebres (The Power of Darkness, which she adapted from Tolstoy, 1924), Saint Jeanne (a translation of Bernard Shaw's Saint Joan, 1925), Comme çi ou comme ça (Like This or Like That), Sardanapale, Mdlle. Bourat, Jean le Maufranc and Hamlet, (1926).

Ludmilla (left) and Georges Pitoëff (right) in Hamlet, 1929.

She made her London stage debut in 1930 playing Jeanne in Saint Jeanne – to the displeasure of the author who complained that she did nothing but snivel and cry, leaving out all the strong lines, (Note: Not everyone shared Shaw's reservations: the author and publisher Rupert Hart-Davis commented, "Sybil Thorndike played St Joan (as Shaw meant) as a bumptious North Country lass: Madame Pitoëff as a tortured mouse. This altered the whole emphasis of the play but didn't spoil it – which proves the play's worth, to my mind". The reviewer in The Stage wrote, "Frail and boyish-looking in appearance, Mme. Pitoëff is ... the visionary girl armed and accoutred for the field. Throughout she never loses her sincerity, and her whole performance is appealing".) and then as Marguerite Gautier in La Dame aux camélias. Returning to London in 1933 she played the title role in Strindberg's Miss Julie, given in French as Mademoiselle Julie. Back in Paris she played five parts in La Ronde, Nora Helmer in Une Maison de poupée (A Doll's House), Mary Meng in Joe et cie (Joe and Company) and appeared in Gants blancs (White Gloves), and revivals of Hamlet and Saint Jeanne.

In 1935 she played Mimi in Çe soir on improvise (Tonight We Improvise) and Nadine in Le Chocolat soldat (The Chocolate Soldier), and appeared in Merveilleux alliage (Wonderful Alloy). In 1936 she appeared in La Folle du ciel (The Madwoman of Heaven), Poncette and as Gemma in Tu ne m'echapperas jamais (Escape Me Never). During 1937 she played in Aural et la lettre du roi (Aural and the King's Letter) and Le Voyageur sans bagage (The Traveller Without Luggage). Her obituary in Le Figaro mentions other plays in which she appeared with distinction, including The Wild Duck, Six Characters in Search of an Author, The Seagull and Uncle Vanya.

After her husband's death in 1939 Pitoëff went to the United States and in 1944 made her Broadway debut as Madame Fisher in The House in Paris. She also appeared in films including La Danseuse rouge (The Red Dancer), Mollenard and Les Eaux troubles (Troubled Waters).

== Personal life ==
The Pitoëffs had seven children, two of whom, Svetlana and Sacha, continued the family's theatrical tradition.

=== Death ===
Having been in poor health for some time, but continuing to work, Pitoëff died in Paris on 15 September 1951, aged 54. She was buried alongside her husband in the cemetery at Genthod in Geneva.

== Notes, references and sources ==
=== Sources ===
- Commire, Anne; Deborah Klezmer, eds. (2007). Dictionary of Women Worldwide: Volume 2 – M–Z. Detroit: Thomson Gale. ISBN 978-0-78-767677-3.
- Croall, Jonathan (2008). Sybil Thorndike: A Star of Life. London: Haus. ISBN 978-1-905791-92-7.
- Hart-Davis, Rupert, ed. (1981). The Lyttelton Hart-Davis Letters, Volume 3. London: John Murray. ISBN 978-0-7195-3770-7.
- Parker, John, ed. (1947). Who's Who in the Theatre (tenth ed.). London: Sir Isaac Pitman and Sons. OCLC 225162446.
