= Claude Winter =

French stage and film actress

- Born: Claude Marthe Elisabeth Wintergerst; 18 February 1931; Tianjin, China
- Died: 25 April 2011 (aged 80); Paris, France
- Occupations: Stage and film actress

Claude Winter (18 February 1931 in Tianjin (China) – 25 April 2011 in Paris) was a French stage and film actress.

== Biography ==
She entered the Comédie-Française on 1 September 1953; became sociétaire on 1 January 1960, then dean 1 January 1987. In 1988, following the death of the administrator (Jean Le Poulain), she acted asadministrator per intérim for two and a half months. When she made the decision to retire, she was named honorary sociétaire by her colleagues.

== Filmography ==
=== Cinema ===
- 1950: Beware of Blondes (by André Hunebelle
- 1954: Crainquebille (by Ralph Habib) - the lawyer
- 1973: Les Hommes (by Daniel Vigne)
- 1984: Le Bon Plaisir (by Francis Girod) - The First Lady
- 1984: A Sunday in the Country (by Bertrand Tavernier) - Mme. Ladmiral
- 1992: Savage Nights (by Cyril Collard) - Jean's mother
- 1993: Couples et Amants (by John Lvoff) - Génia
- 1994: Délit mineur (by Francis Girod)
- 1994: L'ange noir (by Jean-Claude Brisseau) - Mrs. Pitot
- 2010: Rendez-vous avec un ange (by Yves Thomas and Sophie de Daruvar) - the grandmother (final film role)

=== Television ===
- 1962: Le Théâtre de la jeunesse (by Claude Santelli) (L'Auberge de l'ange gardien and Le Général Dourakine) - Madame Blidot
- 1969: Au théâtre ce soir (Affaire vous concernant) (by Jean-Pierre Conti, TV director Pierre Sabbagh, Théâtre Marigny)
- 1969: Le Profanateur - Benvenuta
- 1971: 29 degrés à l'ombre - Mrs. Pomadour
- 1972: Ruy Blas - the queen
- 1972: Le Bunker - Eva Braun
- 1973: Horace - Julie
- 1975: Ondine - Queen Yseult
- 1975: Tartuffe - Elmire
- 1981: Le Pain de ménage - Marthe
- 1982: Les Caprices de Marianne - Hermia
- 1989: L'Été de la Révolution (by Lazare Iglesis) - Mrs. Necker
- 1989: Manon Roland - Manon's mother
- 1989: Les Grandes Familles - Adèle Schoudler
- 1995: Maigret - La comtesse de Saint-Fiacre

== Theatre ==
- 1953: Un caprice by Alfred de Musset, directed by Maurice Escande, Comédie-Française
- 1953: Six Characters in Search of an Author by Luigi Pirandello, directed by Julien Bertheau, Comédie-Française
- 1955: Elizabeth, la femme sans homme by André Josset, directed by Henri Rollan, Comédie-Française
- 1960: Ruy Blas by Victor Hugo, directed by Raymond Rouleau, Comédie-Française
- 1962: La Troupe du Roy, hommage to Molière, directed by Paul-Émile Deiber, Comédie-Française
- 1962: The liar by Corneille, directed by Jacques Charon, Comédie-Française
- 1965: L'Orphelin de la Chine by Voltaire, directed by Jean Mercure, Comédie-Française
- 1967: L'Émigré de Brisbane by Georges Schéhadé, directed by Jacques Mauclair, Comédie-Française
- 1968: Tartuffe by Molière in the part of Elmire, directed by Jacques Charon, Comédie-Française
- 1968: Athalie by Racine, directed by Maurice Escande, Comédie-Française
- 1970: Malatesta by Henry de Montherlant, directed by Pierre Dux, Comédie-Française
- 1970: A Dream Play by August Strindberg, directed by Raymond Rouleau, Comédie-Française
- 1971: Les Sincères by Marivaux, directed by Jean-Laurent Cochet, Comédie-Française
- 1971: Ruy Blas by Victor Hugo, directed by Raymond Rouleau, Comédie-Française at the Théâtre de l'Odéon
- 1972: Horace by Pierre Corneille, directed by Jean-Pierre Miquel, Comédie-Française
- 1973: L'Impromptu de Versailles by Molière, directed by Pierre Dux, Comédie-Française
- 1973: Hunger and Thirst by Eugène Ionesco, directed by Jean-Marie Serreau, Comédie-Française at the Théâtre de l'Odéon
- 1973: Tartuffe by Molière, directed by Jacques Charon, Comédie-Française
- 1973: C'est la guerre Monsieur Gruber de Jacques Sternberg, directed by Jean-Pierre Miquel, Comédie-Française at the Théâtre de l'Odéon
- 1974: Ondine by Jean Giraudoux, directed by Raymond Rouleau, Comédie-Française
- 1975: The Idiot by Fiodor Dostoïevski, directed by Michel Vitold, Comédie-Française et the Théâtre Marigny
- 1976: Cyrano de Bergerac by Edmond Rostand, directed by Jean-Paul Roussillon, Comédie-Française
- 1977: Le Cid by Corneille, directed by Terry Hands, Comédie-Française
- 1978: Murder in the Cathedral by T. S. Eliot, directed by Terry Hands, Palais de Chaillot
- 1978: Six Characters in Search of an Author by Luigi Pirandello, directed by Antoine Bourseiller, Comédie-Française
- 1979: Le Pain de ménage by Jules Renard, directed by Yves Gasc, Comédie-Française
- 1980: Port-Royal by Henry de Montherlant, directed by Jean Meyer, Comédie-Française
- 1980: The Seagull by Tchekhov, directed by Otomar Krejča, Comédie-Française
- 1980: The Moods of Marianne by Alfred de Musset, mise en scène François Beaulieu, Comédie-Française
- 1981: Andromaque by Racine, directed by Patrice Kerbrat, Comédie-Française
- 1981: La Dame de chez Maxim by Georges Feydeau, directed by Jean-Paul Roussillon, Comédie-Française
- 1982: Les Corbeaux de Henry Becque, directed by Jean-Pierre Vincent, Comédie-Française
- 1984: Cinna by Corneille, directed by Jean-Marie Villégier, Comédie-Française
- 1984: La Mort de Sénèque by Tristan L'Hermite, directed by Jean-Marie Villégier, Comédie-Française
- 1985: The Triumph of Love by Marivaux, directed by Alain Halle-Halle, Comédie-Française
- 1985: Macbeth by Shakespeare, directed by Jean-Pierre Vincent, Comédie-Française
- 1987: The Eternal Husband by Dostoevsky, directed by Simon Eine, Comédie-Française at the Théâtre de l'Odéon
- 1987: A Kind of Alaska by Harold Pinter, directed by Bernard Murat, Comédie-Française at the festival d'Avignon
- 1988: Death of a Salesman by Arthur Miller, directed by Marcel Bluwal, Théâtre de l'Odéon, Théâtre national de Nice

== Dubbing ==
- Lady (1st dubbing) :
  - 1955: Lady and the Tramp
- Elizabeth Taylor in :
  - 1959: Suddenly, Last Summer
  - 1963: Cleopatra
- 1954: Janet Leigh in Prince Vaillant
- 1954: Lizabeth Scott in Silver Lode
- 1956: Linda Cristal in Comanche
- 1956: Yvonne De Carlo in The Ten Commandments

== Prizes and awards ==
- 1988 : Prix du Brigadier for Death of a Salesman by Arthur Miller, Centre national de création d'Orléans and Théâtre national de l'Odéon
