= Prix du Brigadier =

The Prix du Brigadier, established in 1960 by the Association de la Régie théâtrale (ART), is an award given to a personality from the world of theater.

The dramatist Jean Anouilh, having rejected all official honors, declared that in his opinion, the only worthwhile reward was the Prix du Brigadier which had been granted to him in 1971. Three other authors have also received this award: Françoise Sagan in 1960; Eugène Ionesco in 1966; and Florian Zeller in 2014.

== Laureates ==
The Association de la Régie théâtrale maintains an archive of the awards.

- 1960: Françoise Sagan for Château en Suède, Théâtre de l'Atelier
- 1961: Maria Casarès, Pierre Brasseur for Cher Menteur de Jerome Kilty, Théâtre de l'Athénée
- 1962: Pierre Dux, Pierre Fresnay for Mon Faust by Paul Valéry, Théâtre de l'Œuvre
- 1963: Marcel Marceau for his show, Théâtre de la Renaissance
- 1964: Jacques Dupond for the settings of Un mois à la campagne by Ivan Turgenev, Théâtre de l'Atelier
- 1966: Eugène Ionesco for La Soif et la faim, Comédie-Française
- 1967: Ariane Mnouchkine for La Cuisine, Cirque Medrano
- 1968: René Ehni for Que ferez-vous en novembre, Théâtre de Lutèce
- 1971: Jean Anouilh for three plays performed during the same period:
  - Les Poissons rouges Théâtre de l'Œuvre,
  - Ne réveillez pas Madame Comédie des Champs-Élysées,
  - Tu étais si gentil quand tu étais petit Théâtre Antoine
- 1972: Bernard Haller for Et alors, Théâtre de la Michodière
- 1973: Rolf Liebermann for The Marriage of Figaro by Wolfgang Amadeus Mozart, Opéra de Paris
- 1975: Peter Brook for Timon of Athens by William Shakespeare, Théâtre des Bouffes du Nord
- 1976: Mary Marquet for her poetic recitals, Théâtre des Bouffes-Parisiens and Théâtre Saint-Georges
- 1978: Jean Le Poulain for Le Faiseur by Honoré de Balzac, Théâtre des Variétés
- 1980: Jeanne Moreau for L'Intoxe by Françoise Dorin, Théâtre des Variétés
- 1981: Roman Polanski for Amadeus by Peter Shaffer, Théâtre Marigny
- 1982: Raymond Gérôme for his entire career and particularly for his play L'Extravagant Mister Wilde, Théâtre de l'Œuvre
- 1984: Jean-Laurent Cochet for his compagny at Théâtre Hébertot
- 1985: Serge Lama, Hubert Monloup, Jacques Rosny and Yves Gilbert for Napoléon, Théâtre Marigny
- 1986: Laurent Terzieff for Témoignage by Brian Friel, théâtre du Lucernaire and for his entire career.
- 1987: Jean-Paul Belmondo for Kean by Jean-Paul Sartre, Théâtre Marigny
- 1988: Claude Winter for Death of a salesman by Arthur Miller, Centre national de création d'Orléans and Théâtre de l'Odéon
- 1990: Francis Huster for the adaptation, the mise-en-scène and the performing of La Peste by Albert Camus, Théâtre de la Porte-Saint-Martin
- 1992:
  - Jacques Mauclair for the direction of L'École des femmes by Molière
  - Robert Hirsch : Brigadier d'honneur for his entire career.
- 1993: Jorge Lavelli for his mise en scène of Macbett by Eugène Ionesco, Théâtre National de la Colline
- 1994: Raymond Devos for his spectacle at the Olympia and his entire career.
- 2002:
  - Fabrice Luchini for his revival of Knock by Jules Romains, Théâtre de l'Athénée
  - Suzanne Flon and Georges Vitaly : Brigadiers d'honneur for his entire career.
- 2003:
  - Michel Aumont for Le Jour du destin by Michel del Castillo, Théâtre Montparnasse
  - Christian Damman : Brigadier d'honneur for his entire career.
- 2005: François Périer : posthumous brigadier d'honneur for his entire career.
- 2008:
  - Christian Schiaretti for Coriolanus, TNP Villeurbanne and Théâtre Nanterre-Amandiers
  - Claude Rich: Brigadier d’honneur for Le Diable rouge, Théâtre Montparnasse and for his entire career.
- 2009:
  - Ludmila Mikaël for L'Amante anglaise
  - Arnaud Denis for sa mise en scène and his interpretation in Les Femmes savantes
  - Étienne Bierry Brigadier d’honneur for his entire career.
- 2010:
  - Robin Renucci for Désiré by Sacha Guitry au Théâtre de la Michodière
  - Michel Galabru Brigadier d'Honneur for his entire career.
- 2011:
  - Thierry Hancisse for L'École des Femmes by Molière at the Comédie-Française,
  - Judith Magre Brigadier d'Honneur for his entire career.
- 2012:
  - Didier Sandre for Collaboration by Ronald Harwood at Théâtre de La Madeleine
  - Jean Piat and Roland Bertin Brigadier d'Honneur for their entire careers.
- 2013 / 2014:
  - Florian Zeller for Le Père at Théâtre Hébertot.
  - Michel Bouquet Brigadier d'Honneur for his entire career.
- 2015:
  - Michel Fau for his mises-en-scène at Théâtre de l’œuvre and Théâtre Antoine.
  - Jacques Seyres Brigadier d'honneur for his entire career.

== Members of the jury ==
In 2014 (alphabetical order): The jury was presided by Danielle Mathieu-Bouillon

- Pascale Bordet, costume designer
- Hans-Peter Cloos, theatre director
- Fanny Cottençon, actress
- Jacques Crépineau, managing director of Théâtre de la Michodière, theater historian
- Emmanuel Dechartre, actor, managing director of Théâtre 14 Jean-Marie Serreau
- Anne Delbée, actress, theatre director, writer
- Stéphanie Fagadau-Mercier, managing director of Comédie des Champs-Élysées
- Myriam Feune de Colombie, actress, managing director of Théâtre Montparnasse
- Frédéric Franck, managing director of Théâtre de l'Œuvre
- Francis Huster, actor, theatre director, author
- Armelle Héliot, journalist, drama critic
- Stéphane Hillel, actor, theatre director, managing director of Théâtre de Paris and of Petit Théâtre de Paris
- Jean-Claude Houdinière, managing director of Atelier-Théâtre Actuel
- Jorge Lavelli, theatre director
- Didier Long, theatre director
- Antoine Masure
- Marie-France Mignal, actress, managing director of Théâtre Saint-Georges
- Fabienne Pascaud, journalist, chief editor of Télérama
- Jean-Marie Rouart, writer, essayist, dramatist, member of the Académie Française
- Catherine Salviat, comedian, ex-Sociétaire of the Comédie-Française
- Éric-Emmanuel Schmitt, playwright, writer, philosoph, co-director of Théâtre Rive Gauche
- Paul Tabet, writer
- Philippe Tesson, journalist, chronicler, chief editor of L'Avant-scène and co-director of Théâtre de Poche-Montparnasse
- Nicolas Vaude, actor, theatre director
- Jean-Philippe Viaud, journalist for France 2

and Annik Caubert for the Association de la Régie Théâtrale

== See also ==
- Trois coups for the meaning of the word "brigadier" in French.
