= Send a Woman When the Devil Fails =

1957 film

Send a Woman with the Devil Fails
- Directed by: Yves Allégret
- Written by: Jean Meckert; Charles Spaak
- Based on: Sans attendre Godot by Jean Amila
- Produced by: Cino Del Duca; Arys Nissotti; Pierre O'Connell
- Starring: Edwige Feuillère; Jean Servais; Jean Debucourt
- Cinematography: André Germain
- Edited by: Claude Nicole
- Music by: Paul Misraki
- Production companies: Cino del Duca; Royal Films; Régina Films; Plazza Films Productions
- Distributed by: Cinédis
- Release date: 15 November 1957 (France)
- Running time: 90 minutes
- Countries: France; Italy; West Germany
- Language: French
- Box office: 913,880 admissions (France)

Send a Woman When the Devil Fails (French: Quand la femme s'en mêle) is a 1957 French-Italian-West German crime film. It is an adaptation of Jean Amila's novel Sans attendre Godot. Directed by Yves Allégret, it was Alain Delon's and also Bruno Cremer's film debut. It was shot at the Billancourt Studios in Paris

== Synopsis ==
Angèle (nicknamed "Maine") is married to Henri Godot who feels his marriage was menaced by a rival. When Angèle is approached by her former husband Félix he hires a young killer.

== Cast ==
- Edwige Feuillère as Angèle
- Jean Servais as Henri Godot
- Jean Debucourt as Auguste Coudert de la Taillerie
- Bernard Blier as Félix Seguin
- Bruno Cremer as Bernard
- Alain Delon as Jo
- Henri Cogan as Alberti
- Pascale Roberts as Gigi
