= Haine (film) =

1980 French drama film

- French poster
- Directed by: Dominique Goult
- Written by: Dominique Goult
- Produced by: Jean-Claude Patrice; Jean-Paul Thirriot
- Starring: Klaus Kinski
- Cinematography: Roland Dantigny
- Edited by: Jean-Claude Bonfanti
- Release date: 9 January 1980
- Running time: 90 minutes
- Country: France
- Language: French

Haine is a 1980 French drama film directed by Dominique Goult and starring Klaus Kinski.

== Cast ==
- Klaus Kinski as Le motard
- Maria Schneider as Madeleine
- Patrice Melennec as Le camionneur
- Évelyne Bouix as La serveuse
- Katia Tchenko as La mère
- Paulette Frantz as La patronne du bistro
- Gérard Boucaron as Bingo
- Georges Werler as Le père
- Jean-Simon Prévost as Le maire
- Bernard Cazassus as Un paysan
- Jean-Pierre Laurent as Le patron du café
