= Sacha Pitoëff =

French actor and director (1920–1990)

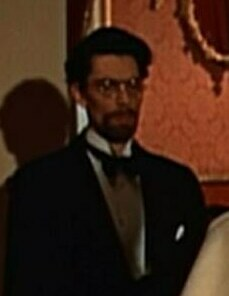
- Pitoëff in Anastasia (1956)
- Born: Alexandre Pitoëff; 11 March 1920; Geneva, Switzerland
- Died: 21 July 1990 (aged 70); Paris, France
- Education: Lycée Pasteur; Théâtre de l'Athénée
- Occupations: Actor; director
- Years active: 1952–1980
- Spouse: Luce Garcia-Ville
- Parent(s): Georges Pitoëff; Ludmilla Pitoëff

Sacha Pitoëff (born Alexandre Pitoëff; 11 March 1920 – 21 July 1990) was a Swiss-born French actor and stage director.

== Early life and education ==
Pitoëff was born in Geneva, Switzerland, on 11 March 1920, the son of Russian-born parents Ludmilla (née Smanova) and Georges Pitoëff. Both of his parents were born in the city of Tbilisi (in modern-day Georgia), then a part of the Russian Empire. The Pitoëffs were prominent actors in France, Georges was a founding member of the Cartel des Quatre (Group of Four), a group including Louis Jouvet, Charles Dullin, and Gaston Baty, dedicated to rejuvenating the French theatre.

Sacha graduated from Lycée Pasteur in Neuilly-sur-Seine, outside Paris. He studied acting and stage direction under Jouvet at the Théâtre de l'Athénée.

== Career ==
=== Stage career ===
During World War II, the younger Pitoëff followed his mother back to Switzerland, where he played his earliest roles. After the war he returned to Paris, becoming general manager at the Théâtre des Bouffes du Nord. He made his directorial debut with a 1950 staging of Uncle Vanya, which proved both a critical and commercial success.

He became a fixture of Parisian theatre in the 1960s, becoming the director of his own troupe. His repertoire included works by Jean Genet, Eugène Ionesco, Hugo Claus, Robert Musil, Anna Langfus and Anton Chekhov. With Romy Schneider, he staged The Seagull, Uncle Vanya and Three Sisters at Théâtre de l'Œuvre.

In 1967, he achieved his greatest success with a well-regarded production of Luigi Pirandello's Henry IV, which he directed and starred in, with Claude Jade.

=== Film acting ===
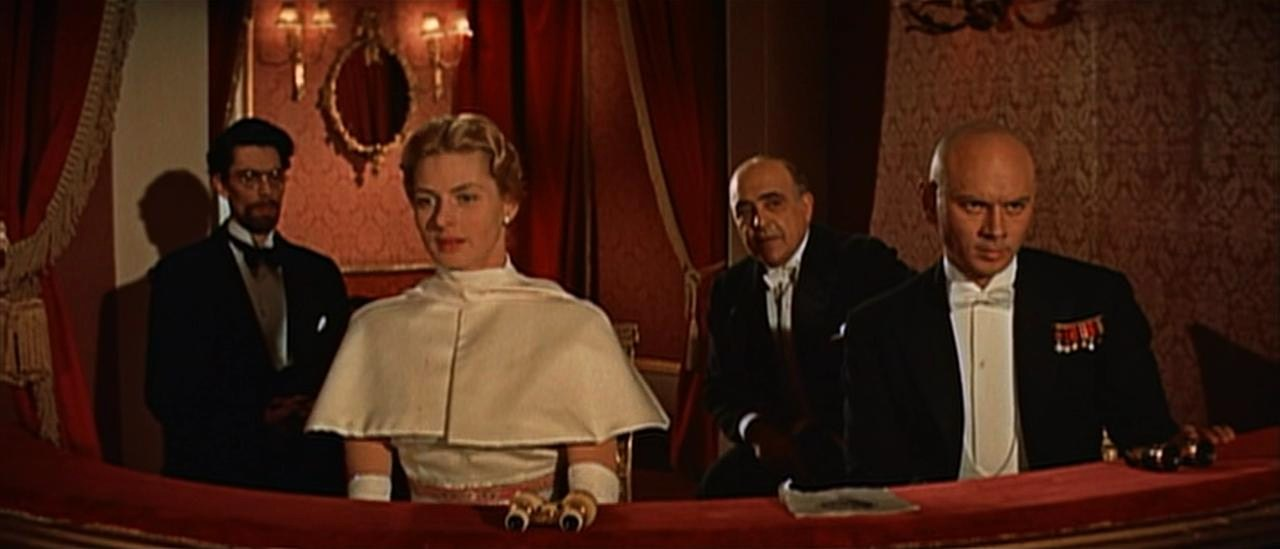
Pitoëff (on the left) with Ingrid Bergman, Akim Tamiroff and Yul Brynner in Anastasia (1956).

Pitoëff played his first film role in 1952, in the omnibus film The Seven Deadly Sins. Appearing in over 50 films, he is probably best known for his performance in Alain Resnais's enigmatic Last Year at Marienbad (1960), as the unnamed man who may or may not be Delphine Seyrig's husband.

He was featured in roles of various sizes in such films as Henri-Georges Clouzot's Les Espions (1957), Peter Ustinov's Lady L (1965), René Clément's Is Paris Burning? (1966), and Jacques Demy's Donkey Skin (1970). He also appeared in several Hollywood productions, including Anatole Litvak's Anastasia (1956) and The Night of the Generals (1967), Mark Robson's The Prize (1963) and Dick Clement's To Catch a Spy (1971).

Toward the end of his acting career, he began appearing in horror films. His final role was as the bookseller Kazanian in Dario Argento's Inferno (1980).

For the last ten years of his life, Pitoëff was a professor at the National School of Theatre Arts and Techniques (ENSATT) in Lyon, where his students included Gérard Depardieu, Jean-Roger Milo and Niels Arestrup.

== Personal life and death ==
Pitoëff was married to French actress Luce Garcia-Ville, until her death by suicide in 1975. He had two siblings, actress Svetlana Pitoëff and writer Aniouta Pitoeff.

His height and distinctively-gaunt, lanky appearance may have been a consequence of Marfan syndrome.

Having suffered from depression in the final years of his life, he died in Paris at Pitié-Salpêtrière Hospital on 21 July 1990, at the age of 70.

== Filmography ==
=== Film ===
Year	Title	Role	Director	Notes
1952	The Seven Deadly Sins	Pianist	Claude Autant-Lara	Segment: "Pride"
1954	Rasputin	Police Chief	Georges Combret	
1956	Anastasia	Pyotr Ivanovich Petrovin	Anatole Litvak	
1957	La Polka des menottes	Eugène	Raoul André	
1957	Les Espions	Léon	Henri-Georges Clouzot	
1958	A Tale of Two Cities	Gaspard	Ralph Thomas	Uncredited
1958	That Night	Shakespearean Actor	Maurice Cazeneuve	
1958	The Gambler	Afpley	Claude Autant-Lara	
1960	Bouche cousue	Jo	Jean Boyer	
1961	Captain Fracasse	Matamore	Pierre Gaspard-Huit	
1961	The Three Musketeers	John Felton	Bernard Borderie	
1961	Last Year at Marienbad	The Second Man	Alain Resnais	
1962	La Poupée	Alexandre Sayas	Jacques Baratier	
1962	La Dénonciation	Commissioner Malferrer	Jacques Doniol-Valcroze	
1963	The Prize	Daranyi	Mark Robson	
1965	Lady L	Revolutionary	Peter Ustinov	
1966	Is Paris Burning?	Frédéric Joliot-Curie	René Clément	
1967	The Night of the Generals	Dr. Lipinski	Anatole Litvak	
1968	L'écume des jours	Pharmacist	Charles Belmont	
1968	La louve solitaire	Saratoga	Edouard Logereau	
1969	The Pleasure Pit	Calzo	André Cayatte	
1970	The Ball of Count Orgel	Prince Naroumouf	Marc Allégret	
1970	Donkey Skin	Prime Minister	Jacques Demy	
1971	To Catch a Spy	Stefan	Dick Clement	
1972	Escape to the Sun		Menahem Golan	
1972	Le journal d'un suicidé	Jailer	Stanislav Stanojevic	
1975	La guerre du pétrole n'aura pas lieu	Essaan	Souheil Ben-Barka	
1978	Dossier 51	Minerve 1 (voice)	Michel Deville	
1979	Subversion	The President	Stanislav Stanojevic	
1980	Patrick Still Lives	Dr. Herschel	Mario Landi	
1980	Inferno	Kazanian	Dario Argento	

=== Television ===
Year	Title	Role	Notes
1955	Captain Gallant of the Foreign Legion	Bartender	Episode: "Camel Race"
1955	Sherlock Holmes	Constable Smith / Morgue Attendant / Gustav	3 episodes
1967	Au théâtre ce soir	Antonio Fabrizzi	Episode: "Le système Fabrizzi", also director
1967	Lagardère	Prince Gonzague	6 episodes
1967	Henri IV	Henri	TV movie, also director
1969	Une soirée au bungalow	Northover	TV movie
1969	La cravache d'or		12 episodes
1970	Le fauteuil hanté	Eliphas de la Nox	TV movie
1972	Schulmeister, espion de l'empereur	Dangberg	Episode: "Schulmeister contre Schulmeister"
1972	Comme il vous plaira	Jacques de Boys	TV movie
1972	Antigone	Tiresias	TV movie
1972	Graf Luckner	Dr. Morgan	Episode: "Der Jazzsänger"
1973	Byron libérateur de la Grèce ou Le jardin des héros	Baron de Blaquiere	TV movie
1973	Incident à Vichy	Prince von Berg	TV movie
1973	Arsène Lupin	Ignateff	Episode: "L'écharpe de soie rouge"
1974	Graf Yoster	Professor Ourbiche	Episode: "Die Feuer-Probe"
1974	Des lauriers pour Lila	Professor Hassman	5 episodes
1974	Notre correspondant à Madras	Jim Sieger	TV movie
1975	Les grands détectives	Arkabad	Episode: "Nick Carter: Mission secrète"
1976	La poupée sanglante	Dr. Sahib Khan	6 episodes
1976	Le château des Carpathes	Gortz	TV movie
1977	The Magical World of Disney	Sergeant	Episodes: "Barry of the Great St. Bernard" (Parts 1 & 2)"
1977	The New Avengers	Kerov	Episodes: "K Is for Kill (Parts 1 & 2)"
1979	La maréchale d'Ancre	Samuel	TV movie
1980	Louis XI, un seul roi pour la France	Drunk	TV movie
1981	Les amours des années folles	The Abbot	Episode: "La femme qui travaille"

== Partial stage credits ==
Year	Title	Venue	Director	Notes
1939	An Enemy of the People	Théâtre des Mathurins	Georges Pitoëff	
1939	The Lady of the Camellias	Théâtre des Mathurins	Georges Pitoëff	
1951	Vogue la galère	Théâtre de la Madeleine	Georges Douking	
1953	L'Épouse injustement soupçonnée	Théâtre des Noctambules	Himself	
1953	Dolorès au balcon	Théâtre des Noctambules	Himself	
1953	Le Gardien des oiseaux	Théâtre des Noctambules	Himself	
1955	Andréa ou la fiancée du matin	Théâtre de l'Œuvre	Himself	
1955	Three Sisters	Théâtre de l'Œuvre	Himself	
1956	The Lower Depths	Théâtre de l'Œuvre	Himself	
1959	Uncle Vanya	Théâtre des Champs-Élysées	Himself	
1960	Three Sisters	Théâtre de l'Alliance française	Himself	
1961	The Seagull	Théâtre Moderne	Himself	
1962	Ivanov	Théâtre Moderne	Himself	
1963	Le système Fabrizzi	Théâtre Moderne	Himself	
1964	Uncle Vanya	Théâtre Moderne	Himself	
1965	Comme un oiseau	Théâtre Moderne	Himself	
1965	The Cherry Orchard	Théâtre Moderne	Himself	
1967	The Seagull	Théâtre Moderne	Himself	
1967-68	Henry IV	Théâtre Moderne	Himself	
1968	Der schwarze schwan	Théâtre Moderne	Himself	
1969	Uncle Vanya	Théâtre Moderne	Himself	
1969	The Caretaker	Théâtre Moderne	Jean-Laurent Cochet	
1970	Henry IV		Himself	
1970	Three Sisters	Théâtre des Célestins	Himself	
1971	The Caretaker	Théâtre des Célestins	Jean-Laurent Cochet	
1971	The Caretaker	Tour	Jean-Laurent Cochet	
1972	L'Impromptu de Paris	Bellac Festival	Edmond Tamiz	
1973	Le Borgne	Théâtre de l'Athénée	Michel Fagadau	
1976	La Tour	Théâtre Récamier	Antoine Bourseiller	
