= L'Ange noir =

L'ange noir
- Directed by: Jean-Claude Brisseau
- Written by: Jean-Claude Brisseau
- Produced by: Alain Sarde, Jean-Claude Brisseau
- Starring: Sylvie Vartan; Michel Piccoli; Tchéky Karyo
- Cinematography: Romain Winding
- Edited by: María Luisa García
- Music by: Jean Musy
- Distributed by: UGC
- Release date: 1994
- Running time: 95 min1994
- Country: France
- Language: French

L'ange Noir (The Black Angel) is a 1994 French drama film written and directed by Jean-Claude Brisseau.

== Plot ==
Stéphane, a judge's wife, masterminds the demise of legendary gangster Aslanian, enlisting the help of her maid. Despite their illicit affair, she feigns ignorance to the police, claiming Aslanian had raped her. However, her carefully constructed alibi crumbles, and she is arrested.

Her magistrate husband summons Paul, a renowned defense attorney, to assist Stéphane in her legal battle. Delving into her past, Paul discovers that she not only worked as a prostitute but also appeared in pornographic films with the notorious Aslanian. Paul falls in love with Stéphane and continues to defend her even though he knows her rape story is a lie.

Stéphane is soon blackmailed by someone who threatens to reveal her past. Paul's negotiations with the blackmailer culminates in a rendezvous where Stéphane's hidden past clashes with her present: in a dramatic twist, she learns that the extortionist is her estranged daughter, Cécile, who reveals that she, too, was Aslanian's lover.

Stéphane is acquitted and released. At the party celebrating her acquittal, Stéphane leaves her husband, her guests and her life behind, and walks to a waiting cab. Armed with a gun, Cécile follows her mother to the cab and shoots, killing her.

During the final scenes, a voiceover unveils the aftermath of the turbulent events. Paul, entangled in the web of his own deceit, faces the consequences of his actions, his legal career crumbling under the weight of disbarment. With her services no longer required, Stéphane's loyal maid departs. Cécile, the agent of chaos, escapes the full force of justice, her suspended sentence a mere footnote in her tale of deception. As Stéphane's husband settles into a wealthy bourgeois retirement, his authority is usurped by his daughter, Cécile, who now lords over their estate.

== Cast ==
- Sylvie Vartan : Stephane Feuvrier
- Michel Piccoli : Georges Feuvrier
- Tchéky Karyo : Paul Delorme
- Alexandra Winisky : Cecile
- María Luisa García : Madeleine
- Philippe Torreton : Christophe
- Bernard Verley : Pitot
- Claude Faraldo : Aslanian
- Claude Giraud : Romain Bousquet
- Claude Winter : Madame Pitot

== Production ==
The film was heavily influenced by other movies, including The Paradine Case (1948), Vertigo (1958) and The Letter (1940).

== Reception ==
The film was poorly received critically and commercially.
