= Les Palmes de M. Schutz =

1997 film

- Directed by: Claude Pinoteau
- Written by: Richard Dembo; Jean-Noël Fenwick; Claude Pinoteau
- Produced by: Emmanuel Schlumberger
- Starring: Isabelle Huppert
- Cinematography: Pierre Lhomme
- Edited by: Marie-Josèphe Yoyotte
- Distributed by: AMLF
- Release date: 9 April 1997
- Running time: 106 minutes
- Country: France
- Language: French
- Budget: $6 million
- Box office: $2.3 million

Les Palmes de M. Schutz is a 1997 French drama film directed by Claude Pinoteau and starring Isabelle Huppert.

== Cast ==
- Isabelle Huppert as Marie Curie
- Philippe Noiret as Paul Schützenberger (Monsieur Schutz)
- Charles Berling as Pierre Curie
- Christian Charmetant as Gustave Bémont
- Philippe Morier-Genoud as De Clausat
- Marie-Laure Descoureaux as Georgette
- Pierre-Gilles de Gennes as Delivery man
- Georges Charpak as Lorry driver
- Suzanne Andrews as Loie Fuller
- Pierre Belot as Visiteur
- Julien Cafaro as Arsène
- Gérard Caillaud as Président séance

== Reception ==
The film opened on 130 screens in France and grossed $543,320 in its opening week, placing eighth at the French box office.

== See also ==
- Isabelle Huppert on screen and stage
- Notable film portrayals of Nobel laureates
