= Arnaud Denis =

French actor and stage director (1983–2026)

- Born: 31 May 1983; Paris, France
- Died: 22 September 2026 (aged 43); Namur, Belgium
- Education: CNSAD
- Occupations: Actor; stage director

Arnaud Denis (French: [aʁnˈo dənˈi]; 31 May 1983 – 22 September 2026) was a French actor and stage director.

== Life and career ==
Born in the 16th arrondissement of Paris on 31 May 1983, Denis attended the École Jeannine Manuel before living two years in New Jersey in the United States, where he appeared in stage productions in English. He then returned to France and studied under Dominique Valadié at the Conservatoire national supérieur d'art dramatique.

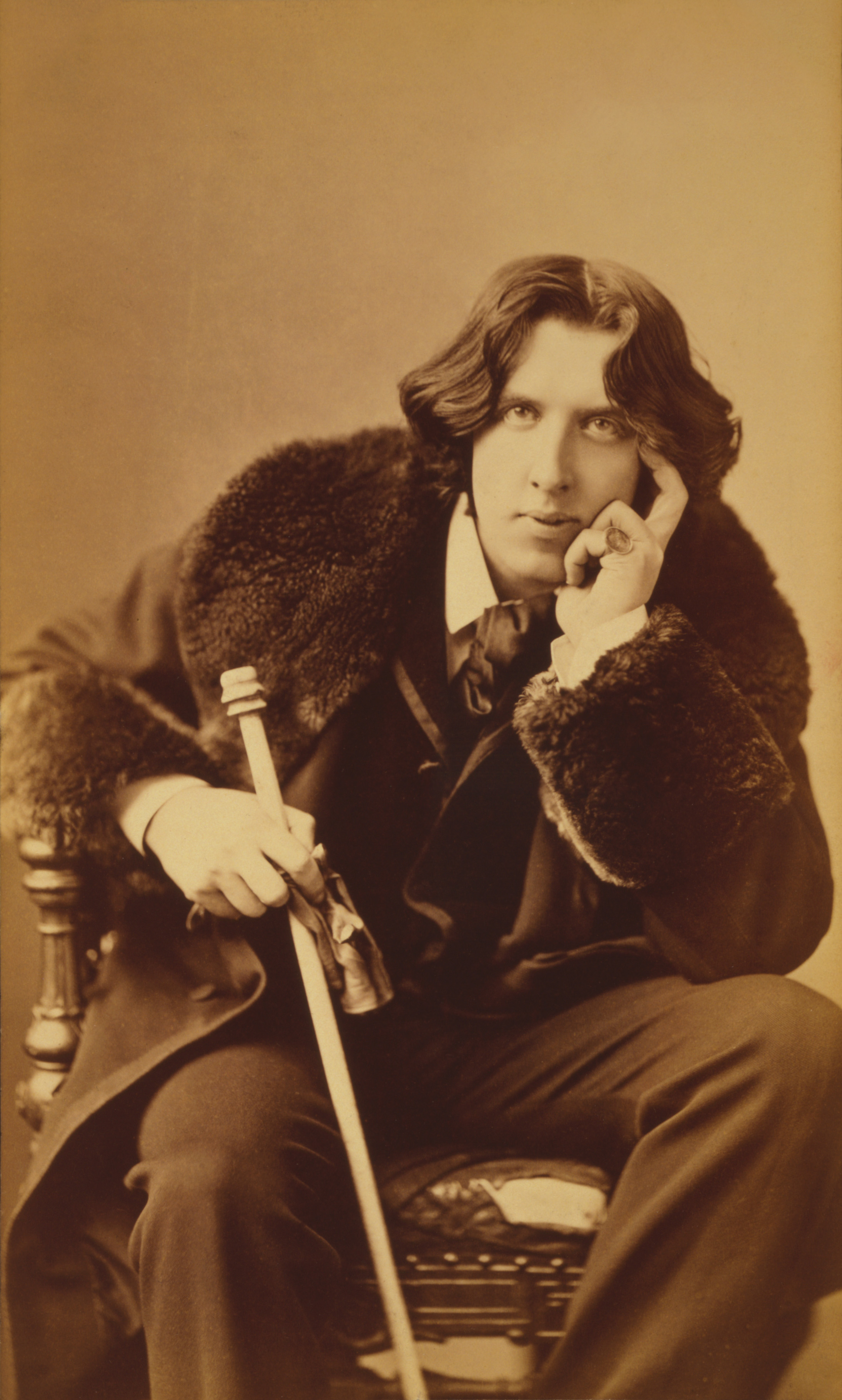
Oscar Wilde

In 2003, Denis founded the Compagnons de la Chimère and appointed Jean-Pierre Leroux to be his artistic director. In his 15 years at the helm, he notably received the Prix du Brigadier for his directorship of Les Femmes Savantes in 2009. In 2011, he wrote a new play titled Autour de la folie, which contained texts from Guy de Maupassant and Gustave Flaubert. In 2016, he became the first to direct the play Nuremberg, la fin de Goering. In 2018, he was nominated for a Molière Award for Theatrical Revelation for his role as Jean Moulin in Jean Moulin, évangile, performed at the Théâtre 14 Jean-Marie-Serreau. In 2020, he directed Marie des Poules, gouvernante chez George Sand, which earned him the Molière Award for Best Show in a Private Theatre. In 2021, he directed The Importance of Being Earnest at the Théâtre Hébertot, which had a cast consisting of Olivier Sitruk and Évelyne Buyle. In 2023, he co-founded the Académie Aparté, a drama school for young actors. In 2024, his direction of the stage adaptation of Les Liaisons dangereuses earned him the Prix du Syndicat de la critique and the Molière Award for Best Supporting Actor.

In July 2023, Denis underwent an operation to treat an inguinal hernia, from which he suffered complications and travelled to the United States for further surgery. He was then diagnosed with ME/CFS. In early 2026, he announced that he was considering moving to Belgium for euthanasia and filing a criminal complaint "contre X", or persons unknown. His lawyer denounced Medtronic for the failure of the medical device. The complaint was formally dismissed on 31 August 2026.

Arnaud Denis died by euthanasia in Namur, on 22 September 2026, at the age of 43.

== Filmography ==
=== Film ===
- Vivre! (2009)
- Yves Saint Laurent (2014)

=== Television ===
- Napoléon (2002)
- Monsieur Max (2006)
- Elles et Moi (2008)
- Candice Renoir (2016)
