= Trois coups =

French theatre tradition to start performances

In a French theatre, les trois coups (the three blows) are hit on the floor of the stage with a stick called brigadier, just before the start of a performance, in order to attract public attention for the rise of the curtain.

In French classical theatre, the dramaturge pounded the ground with twelve quick blows to announce to the machinists the start of the performance. Then a first blow came in response from the fly system operators; a second response rose from below the stage and a third one came from the opposite wing. Each machinist being in their position for the performance, the dramaturge could open the curtain.

The military rank of brigadier was given to a worker leading a team. The dramaturge, using a stick to hit the three blows, gathered the theatre staff to begin the show, like a brigadier gathering his men. Through metonymy, the stick itself was called a "brigadier".

The theatre brigadier is traditionally made of wood with a piece of theatre pole, decorated with red velvet and gold studded nails.

For years the Comédie-Française would hit six blows in order to commemorate the uniting of the two troupes, that of the Hôtel de Bourgogne and Molière's company, previously associated with that of the Théâtre du Marais under Louis XIV, allowing for daily performances.

== At the Olympic Games ==
At the 2024 Summer Olympics in Paris, each session of the games commenced with les trois coups, often referred to as the "coup de bâton ceremony". The brigadier was often wielded by a prominent individual (or pair) in the sport, but also by other public figures and volunteers.

== See also ==
- Prix du Brigadier
