= Thursday We Shall Sing Like Sunday =

1967 film

- Directed by: Luc de Heusch
- Written by: Hugo Claus; Jacques Delcorde; Luc de Heusch
- Produced by: Henri Storck; André Tadié
- Starring: Marie-France Boyer
- Cinematography: Fernand Tack
- Music by: Georges Delerue
- Release date: July 1967
- Running time: 98 minutes
- Countries: Belgium; France
- Language: French

Thursday We Shall Sing Like Sunday (French: Jeudi on chantera comme dimanche) is a 1967 Belgian-French comedy film directed by Luc de Heusch. It was entered into the 5th Moscow International Film Festival.

== Cast ==
- Marie-France Boyer as Nicole
- Bernard Fresson as Jean
- Étienne Bierry as Devos
- Francis Lax as Marc
- Françoise Vatel as Francine
- Hervé Jolly as Pierre
- Raymond Avenière as Raoul
- Simonne Durieu as La mère de Jean
