= The Big Everything =

- Original poster
- Directed by: Nicolas Bazz
- Written by: Nicolas Bazz; Yann Bazz
- Produced by: Ann Barrel; Nicolas Bazz; Yann Bazz
- Starring: Jauris Casanova; Hélène Seuzaret; Benjamin Boyer; Laure Gouget; Pierre-Alain de Garrigues
- Cinematography: Jean-Philippe Bourdon
- Music by: Christophe Jacquelin
- Production company: Ombres Production
- Release date: September 16, 2015
- Running time: 127 minutes
- Country: France
- Language: French

The Big Everything is a 2015 science fiction film directed by Nicolas Bazz.

== Plot ==
In exchange for a full pardon, Niels (Jauris Casanova) joins a group of scientists on a trip to a black hole 50 light years from earth. Because of time dilation, a hundred years will pass on Earth while they are away on their planned six-week journey. However, an accident pushes them even further into space, with no hope of ever returning to their former lives.

== Cast ==
- Jauris Casanova : Niels
- Hélène Seuzaret : Ariane
- Benjamin Boyer : Sam
- Laure Gouget : Lucie
- Pierre-Alain de Garrigues : Harry

== Production ==
=== Production design ===
The spaceship of the film is very obviously not aerodynamic as it is not made for planetary exploration. It flies through the cosmic void, not through air. In the void there is no resistance and therefore no need for aerodynamics. It is designed for only one purpose, says Nicolas Bazz, interstellar travel, as fast as physically possible.

=== Visual effects ===
Before the shoot even started, Nicolas Bazz and Yann Bazz, the former as a producer and the latter as VFX supervisor, made a pact. "No more than a hundred VFX shots". After a full day of shooting and trying to avoid the green screens as much as possible, Nicolas Bazz, as director this time, realized the risk of doing a claustrophobic movie. And so the Bazz brothers made a new pact: there will be as few VFX shots as possible... But not one less. 750 is what was needed to tell the story of those characters properly.

The main challenge of greenscreen shooting is neither technical (though it does take forever) nor financial (it's still less expensive than shooting in space). No, the main difficulty is in the acting. More specifically, the “black hole gaze”. Usually visual cues such as ping pong or tennis balls are used to focus the actor’ eyes on their virtual partners. But no tennis ball can do justice to the wonder, fear and humility such a spectacle should evoke. It takes a lot of discipline and imagination from the actors and absolute accuracy in the direction to pull off. The "black hole gaze" was the focus of many rehearsals, often up until a few seconds before shooting each of those shots.

The director, Nicolas Bazz is usually involved in scouting for locations, but scouting the universe behind a VFX artist's shoulder proved very frustrating. To maintain control over sets and vistas, he asked the VFX supervisor to create a director-friendly interface dubbed “The Universe Engine”. “Space vistas creation” is Nicolas Bazz’ fifth credit on the film.

== Science ==
=== Black holes ===
The black holes of the film aren't holes and they aren't black. The filmmakers chose a very specific type of black holes called Microquasars. The black sphere at the center, also known as the event horizon, is only a part of the whole. The accretion disk is the sum of all the matter the horizon attracts in an ever-accelerating spiral, some of which gets ejected before falling into the horizon, in relativistic particle jets.

=== Quasar alignment ===
Even though The Big Everything is a Hard Sci-Fi movie, using as much real science as possible, some concepts had to be invented. One of those inventions is that quasar class black-holes are aligned with each other, creating a "path" in the universe. To the writer's surprise, it was revealed to be true in 2014, but for as yet unknown reasons. A year later during a public screening, an audience member from the Paris Observatory walked up to the filmmakers during the post-movie debate. He revealed that he and his team had just found out the actual reason for quasar alignment: Dark Matter threads that shape the Universe. The "path" invented for the film has been confirmed by reality.

== Details ==
- Original title: Le Grand Tout
- Directed by: Nicolas Bazz
- Written by: Nicolas Bazz & Yann Bazz
- Produced by: Ann Barrel, Nicolas Bazz & Yann Bazz
- Music: Christophe Jacquelin
- Cinematography: Jean-Philippe Bourdon
- Set decoration: Christian Baquiast
- Costume design: Fabienne Margolliet
- Makeup department: Zoë vand der Waal
- Country: France
- Genre: Science-Fiction
- Running time: 127 minutes
- Release dates:
  - France: September 16; 2015
