= Jean-Noël Fenwick =

French actor (1950–2024)

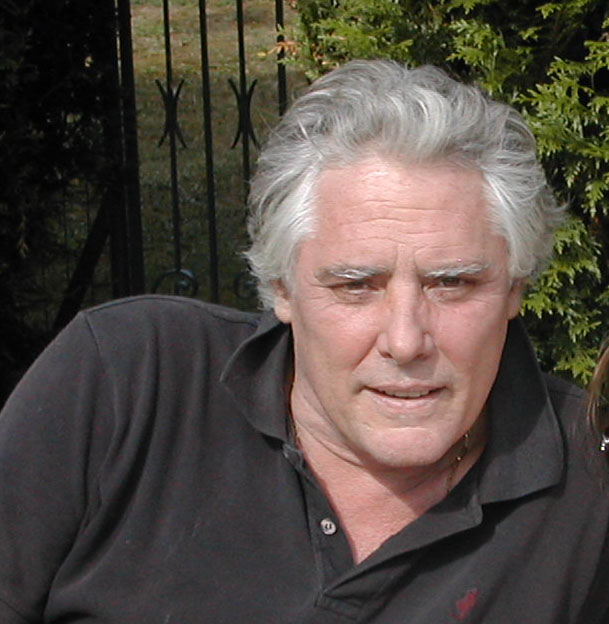
- Born: December 6, 1950
- Died: May 3, 2024 (aged 73); Puteaux
- Citizenship: France

Jean-Noël Fenwick (6 December 1950 – 3 May 2024) was a French dramatist, screenwriter, director, and actor known for works such as Les Palmes de Monsieur Schutz, for which he won the Molière Award for Best Author in 1990. He was an Officer of the Order of Arts and Letters.

== Family ==
Jean-Noël Fenwick was born on 6 December 1950 in Neuilly-sur-Seine, he was the son of Bernadette Fenwick, the grandson of Kate Gillou, the great-grandson of Jacques Rouché, and the great-great-grandson of entrepreneur Noël Fenwick, founder of the lifting equipment company Fenwick-Linde.

In 1975, he briefly married Charlotte de Turckheim, who was then twenty years old. They divorced the following year.

He is the father of actor Arthur Fenwick.

== Artistic career ==
After graduating with a master's degree in Modern Literature, Fenwick initially worked as a journalist and advertiser, while also beginning his career as a playwright and actor in café-theatres. He wrote several classical plays, but they were never staged.

In 1988, he decided to fully dedicate himself to dramatic writing and, within a few weeks, wrote Palmes de M. Schutz, a "cheerful, tender, and scientific" comedy play that traces the discovery of radioactivity and later radium by Pierre and Marie Curie. The play was written by the Théâtre des Mathurins, and was directed by Gérard Caillaud. The latter, captivated by the text, decided to stage the play, direct it, and perform the role of Schutz.

The play premiered in September 1989. After a difficult start, with active support from both the theatre profession and the scientific community, including Pierre Joliot, Georges Charpak, and Pierre-Gilles de Gennes, the performance began to achieve moderate success. In March 1990, it received eleven nominations for the annual Molière Awards, winning in four categories (Best Author, Best Director, Best Set and Costume Design, Best Private Theatre Show of the Year). Over six consecutive seasons, the play became a major success. It also received the Académie des U prize and the Prix du jeune théâtre Béatrix-Dussane–André-Roussin from the Académie française.

Fenwick is also the author of Calamity Jane, Potins d'enfer (which he also directed), and Moi, mais en mieux.

He also participated in several television series, adapted Palmes de M. Schutz for the screen, and made some appearances as an actor in films written and directed by his friends, such as Pierre Salvadori, Diane Kurys, and Claude Pinoteau.

In October 2010, he published a short scientific essay with Éditions Albin Michel, summarizing in 200 pages the scientific phenomena that have led to humanity, from the Big Bang: the appearance of particles, then nucleons, atoms, molecules, cells, multicellular creatures, and so on. The narrative ends with the first civilizations, the invention of writing, and the appearance of monotheism.

He subsequently remounted Potins d'Enfer for a first tour before a Paris reprise in 2013, with Christophe Bélair, Gaëlle Gedon, Marc-Antoine Moreau from the Compagnie On Air.

In 2012, Calamity Jane was once again staged, this time directed by Alain Sachs, with Clémentine Célarié and Yvan Le Bolloc'h, at the Théâtre de Paris, directed by Stéphane Hillel, who had once portrayed Pierre Curie for a thousand performances of Palmes de M. Schutz.

Palmes de M. Schutz was revived once again from 19 September 2013, at the Théâtre Michel in Paris, directed by Didier Caron. The new production was entrusted to Patrick Zard, a theatre brother of the author, continuing the work of Gérard Caillaud, who directed the original production. The set by Jacques Voizot was retained, as well as the instruments used by the Curie couple, reproduced identically. The cast this time includes Constance Carrelet, Benjamin Egner, Daniel Hanssens, Valérie Vogt, Guillaume Bouchède, and Michel Crémadès.

Jean-Noël Fenwick died on 3 May 2024 in Puteaux.
