= Gérard Caillaud =

French actor and theatre director (1946–2023)

- Born: 10 April 1946; Poitiers, France
- Died: 28 January 2023 (aged 76)
- Education: Conservatoire national supérieur d'art dramatique
- Occupations: Actor; Theatre director

Gérard Caillaud (French pronunciation: [ʒeʁaʁ kajo]; 10 April 1946 – 28 January 2023) was a French actor and theatre director.

== Biography ==
Born in Poitiers on 10 April 1946, Caillaud studied at the Conservatoire national supérieur d'art dramatique until 1971, when he became a resident of the Comédie-Française. He performed many pieces by Molière until his departure in 1978. From 1984 to 1997, he was director of the Théâtre des Mathurins, where he staged plays such as Les Palmes de Monsieur Schutz, which won him a Molière Award for Best Director in 1990. On television, he played the role of Capitaine Bonaventure in the series Sœur Thérèse.com.

Gérard Caillaud died on 28 January 2023, at the age of 76.

== Filmography ==
=== Film ===
- We Were Mistaken About a Love Story (1974)
- The Accuser (1977)
- L'argent des autres (1978)
- The Dogs (1979)
- An Adventure for Two (1979)
- Un si joli village (1979)
- Dumb But Disciplined (1979)
- The Woman Cop (1980)
- T'inquiète pas, ça se soigne (1980)
- Prends ton passe-montagne, on va à la plage (1983)
- Y a-t-il un pirate sur l'antenne ? (1983)
- L'Addition (1984)
- Until September (1984)
- Paulette, la pauvre petite milliardaire (1986)
- La Galette du roi (1986)
- La Maison assassinée (1988)
- The Mills of Power (1988)
- Fanfan (1993)
- Les Palmes de M. Schutz (1997)
- Ma femme s'appelle Maurice (2002)
- Le Grand Rôle (2004)
- Madame Irma (2006)

=== Television ===
- Au théâtre ce soir (1970)
- Les Grands Détectives (1975)
- Commissaire Moulin (1978)
- Julien Fontanes, magistrat (1981)
- Messieurs les jurés (1981)
- Sœur Thérèse.com (2003–2011)
- Contes et nouvelles du xixe siècle (2010)
