= Amédée, or How to Get Rid of It =

Play written by Eugène Ionesco

Amédée, or How to Get Rid of It (French: Amédée ou comment s'en débarrasser) is a play written by Eugène Ionesco in 1954 based on his earlier short story entitled "Oriflamme".

== Plot ==
The premise of the play is revealed in the opening scene with a growing corpse. Amédée and Madeleine, the two main characters, are grotesque and dehumanized as they consider their options for disposing of the corpse.

The play is about Amédée, a playwright, and his wife Madeleine, a switchboard operator. They discuss how to deal with a continually growing corpse in the other room. The corpse is causing mushrooms to sprout all over the apartment and is apparently arousing suspicion among the neighbours. The audience is given no clear reason why the corpse is there. Madeleine suggests he was the lover Amédée murdered; Amédée gives several alternate explanations. At the end of the play, Amédée attempts to drag the corpse away to dump it in the river. He is seen by many passers-by; one of the witnesses is referred to as "Eugene" and is likely the author himself. When Amédée becomes tangled in the legs, the corpse floats away with Amédée attached.

== Analysis ==
The play contains many of Ionesco's common themes, and the characters are typical of his plays. For example, the couple's interaction is similar in many ways to the interaction between the Old Man and the Old Woman in The Chairs; the conflicting background story of the corpse parallels the old couple's conflicting stories about their children. Amédée is also in many ways the prototype of Bérenger, one of Ionesco's most commonly used characters; specifically, many of the actions and themes presage A Stroll in the Air (1963), Ionesco's fourth Bérenger play: both Amédée and Bérenger are frustrated artists, both take a moment to appreciate the beauty around them, and both fly away leaving their spouses behind.

== Bibliography ==
- Kyle, Linda Davis (1976). "The Grotesque in Amédée or How to Get Rid of It". Modern Drama. 19 (3): 281–290. doi:10.3138/md.19.3.281. S2CID 191461164.
