= Georges Pitoëff =

Russian-born French stage actor and director

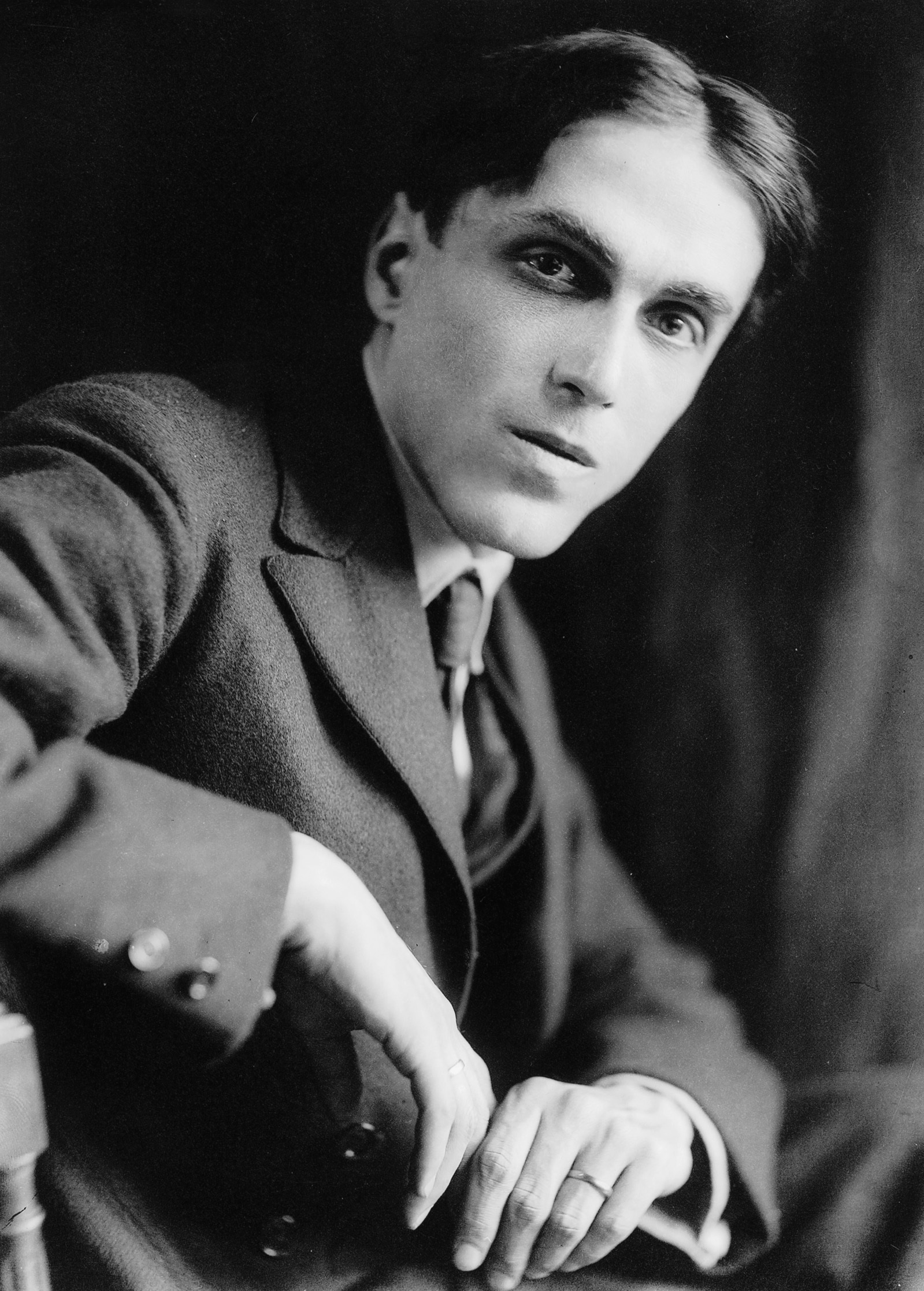
- Born: Gevorg Ovanesovich Pitoyan; 4 September 1884; Tiflis, Tiflis Governorate, Russian Empire (now Tbilisi, Georgia)
- Died: 17 September 1939 (aged 55); Bellevue, Canton of Geneva, Switzerland
- Education: Moscow State University; St. Petersburg State Transport University; University of Paris
- Occupation: Actor
- Spouse: Ludmilla Pitoëff (m. 1915)
- Children: 7, including Sacha

Georges Pitoëff (Russian: Георгий Питоев; 4 September 1884 – 17 September 1939) was a Russian-born French stage actor and director with an Armenian background. He became one of the leading actors and directors in France.

== Early life and education ==
Pitoëff was born Gevorg Ovanesovich Pitoyan on 4 September 1884 in Tiflis, Russian Empire (now Tbilisi, Georgia) to prominent Russian-born parents of Armenian origin. His father was the director of the Tiflis Imperial Theatre. After studying and graduating in law at Paris University, he switched his focus to a career in the theatre. Back in Russia, Pitoëff trained with Konstantin Stanislavski.

== Career ==
In France he became a theatre director and producer, noted for his popularization of the works of contemporary playwrights, especially George Bernard Shaw, Anton Chekhov, Arthur Schnitzler, Henrik Ibsen, and Eugene O'Neill. He was a founding member of the Cartel des Quatre (Group of Four), a group including Louis Jouvet, Charles Dullin, and Gaston Baty, dedicated to rejuvenating the French theatre.

== Personal life ==
Pitoëff married actress Ludmilla Pitoëff in 1915. One of their sons, Alexandre, known as Sacha Pitoëff, was himself a noted theatre director and actor.

== Death ==
Pitoëff died on 17 September 1939 in Bellevue, near Geneva, Switzerland.
