= Murielle Magellan =

French writer and theater director (born 1967)

Murielle Magellan (born 1967) is a French writer and theater director.

She was born Murielle Dbjay in Limoges and grew up in Montauban. She took the name Murielle Magellan when she moved to Paris at the age of 17. Magellan studied at the Studio des Variétés and the school of the Théâtre national de Chaillot there. She lived in Montreuil for ten years and has lived in Rosny-sous-Bois since 2001.

She was coauthor for the television mini-series Petits meurtres en famille which won a Globe de Cristal Award in 2006. She was also coauthor for the television film La Joie de vivre, based on the novel by Émile Zola.

== Selected works ==
Sources:

- La saveur subtile des dinosaures, play (1995)
- Pierre et Papillon, play, received the Prix de l’association Beaumarchais in 2002
- Le Lendemain Gabrielle, novel (2007)
- Traits d'union, play
- (Sous les jupes des filles, film script
- Si j’étais un homme, film script
- Les Petits Meurtres d'Agatha Christie, television series
- Un refrain sur les murs, novel (2011)
- N’oublie pas les oiseaux, novel (2014)
- Les indociles, novel (2016)
- Changer le sens des rivières, novel
