= Luc de Heusch =

Belgian filmmaker, writer and anthropologist

- Born: 7 May 1927; Brussels, Belgium
- Died: 7 August 2012 (aged 85); Brussels, Belgium
- Occupations: Anthropologist, filmmaker, writer

Luc de Heusch (7 May 1927 – 7 August 2012) was a Belgian filmmaker, writer, and anthropologist, professor emeritus at the Université libre de Bruxelles. His 1967 film Thursday We Shall Sing Like Sunday was entered into the 5th Moscow International Film Festival.

== Life ==
Luc de Heusch began his career in film in 1947 as assistant to Henri Storck. From 1949 to 1951 he lived in an artists' commune, the Ateliers du Marais. In 1951, under the pseudonym Luc Zangrie, he directed Perséphone, the only film produced by the CoBrA artistic movement.

In 1953 and 1954 he carried out anthropological fieldwork in the Belgian Congo and Ruanda-Urundi. Like Henri Storck and Charles Dekeukeleire, he also made documentary films about the Congo.

From 1955 to 1992 he was professor of social and cultural anthropology at the Free University of Brussels, later Université libre de Bruxelles.

== Select bibliography ==
In English

- The Cinema and Social Science. A Survey of Ethnographic and Sociological Films, UNESCO, 1962.
- Why Marry Her? Society and Symbolic Structures, trans by Janet Lloyd, Cambridge University Press, 1981.
- The Drunken King, or, The Origin of the State, trans by Roy Willis, Indiana University Press, 1982.
- Sacrifice in Africa: A Structuralist Approach, trans by Linda O'Brien and Alice Morton, Manchester University Press, 1985.

In French

- Essais sur le symbolisme de l'inceste royal en Afrique, Ed. Université Libre de Bruxelles, 1958.
- Le pouvoir et le sacré, Ed. Université Libre de Bruxelles, 1962.
- Le Rwanda et la civilisation interlacustre. Études d'anthropologie historique et structurale, Ed. Université Libre de Bruxelles, 1966.
- Pourquoi l'épouser? et autres essais, Gallimard, coll Sciences Humaines Paris, 1971.
- Le roi ivre ou l'origine de l'État. Mythes et rites bantous I, Gallimard, Coll. Les Essais Paris, 1972.
- Rois nés d'un cœur de vache. Mythes et rites bantous II, Gallimard, Coll. Les Essais, Paris, 1982.
- Le sacrifice dans les religions africaines, Paris, Gallimard, « Bibliothèque des sciences humaines », 1986.
- Ecrits sur la royauté sacrée, Editions de l'Université de Bruxelles, Bruxelles, 1987.
- Mémoire, mon beau navire : les vacances d'un ethnologue, Actes Sud, 1998.
- Le Roi de Kongo et les monstres sacrés. Mythes et rites bantous III, Gallimard, Coll. Les Essais Paris, 2000.
- Du pouvoir: anthropologie politique des sociétés d'Afrique centrale, Presse de l'Université de Nanterre, 2002.
- Pouvoir et religion : (pour réconcilier l'Histoire et l'anthropologie), Editions des Sciences de l'Homme, 2009.

== Select filmography ==
- Perséphone (1951)
- Fête chez les Hamba (1955)
- Ruanda (1956)
- Michel De Ghelderode (1957)
- Six mille habitants (1958)
- Gestes du repas (1958)
- Magritte ou La leçon de choses (1960)
- Thursday We Shall Sing Like Sunday (1967)
- Sur les traces du renard pâle (Recherches en pays Dogon, 1931–1983) (1984)
- Une république devenue folle: Rwanda 1894-1994 (1995)
- Quand j'étais Belge (1999)
