= Jacques Rosny =

French actor (1939–2020)

- Born: 25 March 1939; Tarbes, France
- Died: 18 April 2020 (aged 81); Nogent-sur-Marne, France
- Occupation: Actor
- Years active: 1971–1997

Jacques Rosny (25 March 1939 – 18 April 2020) was a French actor.

== Biography ==
Rosny married actress Annick Blancheteau in 1971, with whom he had two kids.

In 1973, with Jean-Claude Houdinière and Loïc Vollard, Rosny purchased the Théâtre de l'Athénée. He left the theatre the following year.

Jacques Rosny died on 18 April 2020, at the age of 81, in Nogent-sur-Marne due to COVID-19.

== Filmography ==
=== Cinema ===
- Un nuage entre les dents (1974) - Un rédacteur
- Le Chaud Lapin (1974) - Le metteur en scène de théâtre
- Catherine & Co. (1975) - Jean-Pierre
- The Tenant (1976) - Jean-Claude
- Le Dernier Baisier (1977) - L'agent de Police
- Clara et les Chics Types (1981) - Michel
- Périgord noir (1989) - Charles
- Loulou Graffiti (1992) - Le proviseur
- L.627 (1992) - Tulipe 4
- Le Troc (1993) - Avocat de la défense
- Profil bas (1993) - Malard
- Les Braqueuses (1994)

=== Television ===
- Voulez-vous jouer avec moâ? (1972) - Rascasse
- M. Klebs et Rosalie (1977, TV Movie)
- Richelieu (1977) - Louis XIII
- Les Folies Offenbach (1977) - René Luguet
- Le Loup blanc (1977, TV Movie) - Jean Blanc / Le 'loup blanc'
- Les Grandes Conjurations (1978) - Henri III
- Mazarin (1978) - Louis XIII
- Les Youx bleus (1979) - Charles Sorgues
- L'Abuseur de Séville (1980, TV Movie) - Batricio
- La Naissance du jour (1980) - Segonzac
- Les Folies du samedi soir (1980, TV Movie) - Gaston
- Bel ami (1983) - La Roche Mathieu
- Un homme va être assassiné (1984, TV Movie) - Charles Pélissier
- Le Diable dans le bénitier (1985, TV Movie) - L'abbé Michel
- Le Cri de la chouette (1986, TV Movie) - Jean Rezeau
- Le Dernier Tour (1994, TV Movie) - Benoli
- Comment épouser un héritage? (1995, TV Movie) - Le maire
- Coeur de cible (1996, TV Movie) - Le directeur Rhinocéros
- L'Amerloque (1996, TV Movie) - Monsieur de Mandrieu
- Mauvaises Affaires (1997, TV Movie) - Guérin, le procureur (final film role)

== Awards ==
- Prix du Brigadier (1985)
