= Robert Marcy =

French actor and stage director (1920–2024)

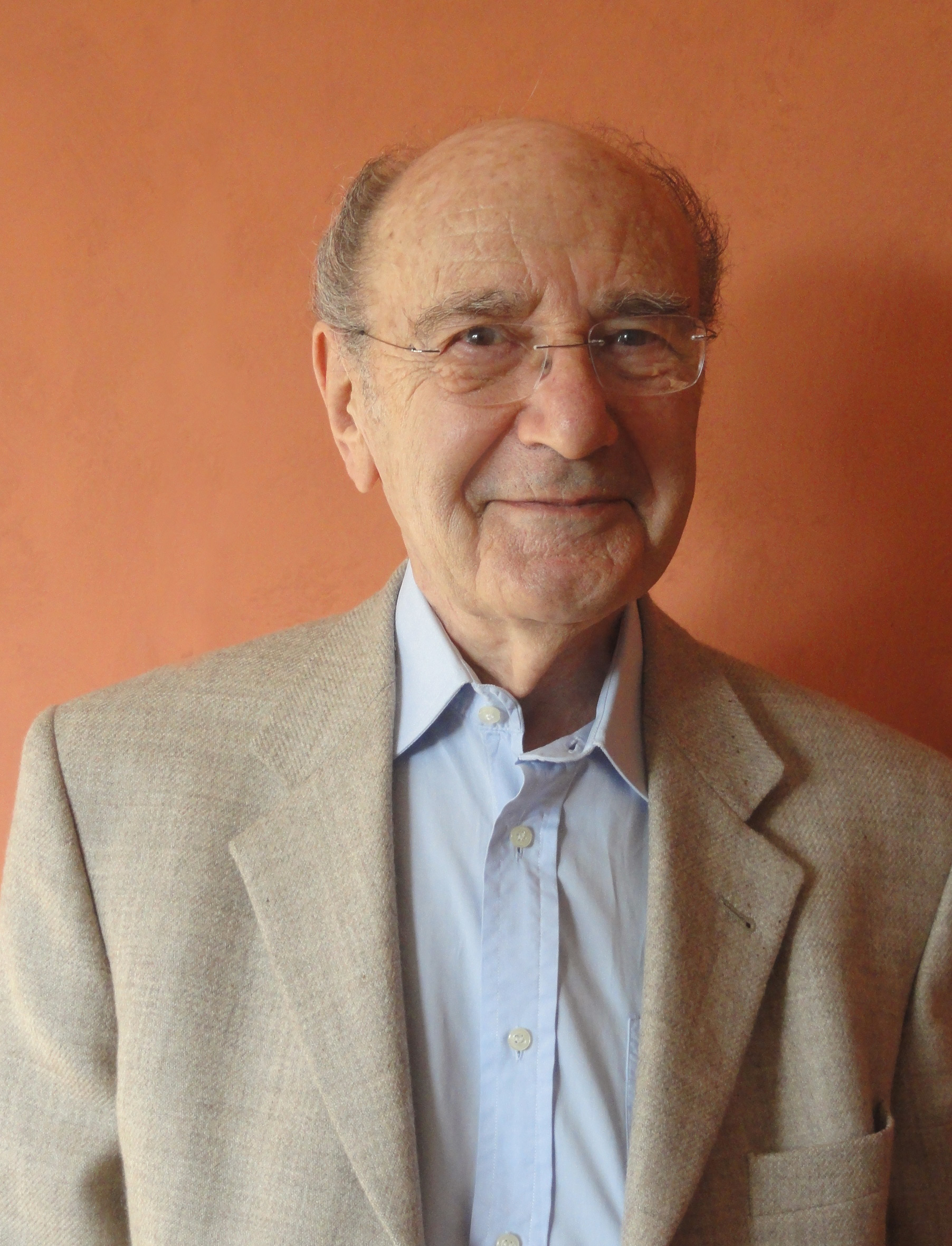
- Marcy in 2011
- Born: Robert Louis Marx; 4 July 1920; Paris, France
- Died: 8 September 2024 (aged 104); Paris, France
- Occupations: Actor; Stage director

Robert Louis Marx, better known as Robert Marcy, (4 July 1920 – 8 September 2024) was a French actor and stage director. He turned 100 in July 2020, and died on 8 September 2024, at the age of 104.

== Filmography ==
- Le Jour du marché (2015)

== Publication ==
- Chansons sans âge, de « File la laine » à « La Queue du chat » (2009)
