= Michel Dubois (actor) =

French theatre director (1937–2021)

- Born: 21 September 1937; Saint-Imier, Switzerland
- Died: 4 July 2021 (aged 83); Paris, France
- Occupation: Theatre director

Michel Dubois (21 September 1937 – 4 July 2021) was a French theatre director and actor.

== Biography ==
Dubois studied at the school of the National Theatre of Strasbourg from 1958 to 1961 and began his career as an assistant to Jean Dasté at the Comédie de Saint-Étienne, where he staged his first productions. In 1970, the Comédie de Caen was founded and Dubois became director two years later following the death of Jo Tréhard, a role he held until 1996. In 1997, he succeeded René Loyon as director of the Centre dramatique national Besançon Franche-Comté. He was also president of Syndeac from 1991 to 1994 and of the Centre national du théâtre from 2002 to 2006. He retired from the theatre in 2006.

Michel Dubois died in Paris on 4 July 2021 at the age of 83.

== Theatre ==
=== Actor ===
- La Charrue et les étoiles (1962)
- Un homme seul (1966)
- Mr Puntila and his Man Matti (1966)
- Les Derniers (1967)
- The Government Inspector (1967)
- Le Dragon (1968)
- Avoir (1969)
- Dialogues d'exilés (1989)
- La Fabrique de couleurs (1992)
- La Botte et sa chaussette (1995)
- Révélations (2007)

=== Director ===
- Andorra (1965)
- Le Drame des mots (1972)
- Titus Andronicus (1972)
- Martin Luther et Thomas Münzer (1973)
- Les Estivants (1976)
- Loin d'Hagondange (1976)
- La Gangrène (1977)
- Lenz (1977)
- L'Imbécile (1979)
- Le Désamour Scènes de vie, de mort et de ménage (1980)
- Le Nouveau Menoza (1980)
- Actes relatifs à la vie, à la mort et à l'œuvre de Monsieur Raymond Roussel, homme de lettres (1983)
- Krapp's Last Tape (1983)
- Double Inconstancy (1984)
- Été (1984)
- Amphitryon (1986)
- Titus Andronicus (1987)
- Ainsi va le monde (1988)
- L'Étalon Or (1988)
- La Chambre et le temps (1991)
- La Princesse de Milan (1991)
- La Tempête (1992)
- Un ciel pâle sur la ville (1993)
- La Botte et sa chaussette (1994)
- Caresses (1994)
- La serveuse quitte à quatre heures (1994)
- La Botte et sa chaussette (1995)
- La Seconde Surprise de l'amour (1995)
- Moi qui ai servi le Roi d'Angleterre (1995)
- The Merchant of Venice (1998)
- La Maison des cœurs brisés (1999)
- Si c'est un homme (2001)
- The Master Builder (2001)
- Vêtir ceux qui sont nus (2002)
