= Jean Amila =

French author and screenwriter

Jean Amila (Paris, 24 November 1910 – 6 March 1995) was an anarchist French writer and screenwriter who also wrote under the names John Amila, Jean Mekert, or Jean Meckert.

== Works ==
=== Science-Fiction ===
- La ville de plomb
- Le 9 de pique (1956)

=== Mysteries ===
- Nous Avons les Mains Rouges (1947)
- Y'a pas de Bon Dieu! (1950)
- Motus! (1953)
- La Bonne Tisane (1955)
- Sans Attendre Godot (1956)
- Le Drakkar (1959)
- Les Loups dans la Bergerie (1959)
- Jusqu'à Plus Soif (1962)
- La Lune d'Omaha (1964)
- Noces de Soufre (1964)
- Pitié pour les Rats (1964)
- Les Fous de Hong-Kong (1969)
- Le Grillon Enragé (1970)
- Contest-Flic (1972)
- La Nef des Dingues (1972)
- Terminus Iéna (1973)
- A Qui ai-je l'Honneur?.. (1974)
- Le Pigeon des Faubourgs (1981)
- Le Chien de Montargis (1983)
- Langes Radieux (1984)
- Au Balcon d'Hiroshima (1985)

=== Historical Novels ===
- Le Boucher des Hurlus

=== Screenplays ===
- Nous sommes tous des assassins
- Le Miroir à deux faces (as Jean Meckert)
