= Centre national de création d'Orléans =

French drama centre

The Centre national de création d'Orléans (transl. National Creation Center of Orléans) or CADO is a center of French drama, founded in 1988 in Orléans, in the department of Loiret. It is subsidized by the city of Orleans and the department of Loiret after the State stopped subsidizing CADO in 2008. It is headed by Christophe Lidon as of 2021.

== Premises and programming ==
The Orléans-Loiret National Creation Center is housed in Théâtre d'Orléans. It cohabits with the Center dramatique national, the Scène nationale and the Center chorégraphique national d'Orléans. The building can accommodate the public in three rooms, with 200 to 700 seats.

== Management ==
The center has four permanent employees. Its budget varies around 2 million euros, including 1 million in grants.
