= Georges Werler =

French actor and stage director (1938–2026)

- Born: Georges Wojazer; April 1938
- Died: 3 November 2026 (aged 88)
- Education: Conservatoire national supérieur d'art dramatique
- Occupations: Actor; director

Georges Werler (né Wojazer; French: [ʒˈɔʁʒ wˈɜːlə]; April 1938 – 3 November 2026) was a French actor and stage director.

A graduate of the Conservatoire national supérieur d'art dramatique, he won two awards from the Académie Charles Cros throughout his stage career: the Grand prix avec Les Poémiens in 1965 and the Grand Prix In Honorem in 2006.

Werler died on 3 November 2026 aged 88.

== Filmography ==
=== Film ===
- Haine (1980)

=== Television ===
- Marie-Antoinette (1975)
- Les Cinq Dernières Minutes (1977, 1982)
- Émile Zola ou la Conscience humaine (1978)
- Julien Fontanes, magistrat (1979)
- La Vie des autres (1981)
- Pause café (1981)
