= Molière Award for Best Supporting Actor =

French award for theater performances

Molière Award for Best Supporting Actor. Winners and nominees.

== 1980s ==
- 1987 : Pierre Arditi in The Rehearsal (La Répétition ou l'Amour puni)
  - Jean-Michel Dupuis in Conversations After a Burial (Conversations après un enterrement)
  - Patrick Raynal in As Is (Tel quel)
  - Jean-Paul Roussillon in Conversations After a Burial (Conversations après un enterrement)
  - Didier Sandre in The Marriage of Figaro (La Folle Journée ou le Mariage de Figaro)
- 1988 : Pierre Vaneck in The Secret (Le Secret)
  - Fabrice Eberhard in Death of a Salesman (Mort d'un commis voyageur)
  - Jean-Paul Farré in The Metamorphosis (La Métamorphose)
  - Jacques Jouanneau in Les Cahiers Tango
  - Fabrice Luchini in The Secret (Le Secret)
- 1989 : Étienne Chicot in Une absence
  - Claude Evrard in A Month in the Country (Un mois à la campagne)
  - Henri Garcin in Just Between Ourselves (Entre nous soit dit)
  - François Lalande in Home (Le Foyer)
  - Michel Robin in L'Imposture

== 1990s ==
- 1990 : Michel Robin in The Passage of Winter (La Traversée de l'hiver)
  - Gérard Caillaud in Les Palmes de Monsieur Schutz
  - Martin Lamotte in A Fly in the Ointment (Un fil à la patte)
  - Roger Mirmont in La Celestina (La Célestine)
  - Henri Virlogeux in Ivanov
- 1991 : Jean-Paul Roussillon in Zone libre
  - Jacques Bonnaffé in La Fonction
  - Jean-Paul Farré in Les Fourberies de Scapin
  - Mario Gonzalez in Les Fourberies de Scapin
  - Georges Wilson in Eurydice
- 1992 : Robert Hirsch in Le Misanthrope
  - Jean-Pierre Darroussin in Cuisine et dépendances
  - Maurice Garrel in Making It Better (C'était bien)
  - Gérard Hernandez in No Hard Feelings (Sans rancune)
  - Sam Karmann in Cuisine et dépendances
- 1993 : Jean-Pierre Sentier in L’Église
  - Bernard Alane in La Jalousie
  - Michel Duchaussoy in Pygmalion
  - Fabrice Eberhard in Romeo and Jeannette (Roméo et Jeannette)
  - Michel Etcheverry in Temps contre Temps
- 1994 : Roland Blanche in The Resistible Rise of Arturo Ui (La Résistible Ascension d'Arturo Ui)
  - Roger Dumas in The Homecoming (Le Retour)
  - Gérard Hernandez in Le Dîner de Cons
  - Francis Lax in The Floating Light Bulb (L'Ampoule magique)
  - Guy Tréjan in Hamlet
- 1995 : Darry Cowl in Baby's Laxative (On purge bébé) and Madame's Late Mother (Feu la mère de Madame)
  - Jean-Pierre Darroussin in Un air de famille
  - Bernard Dhéran in Business is business (Les Affaires sont les affaires)
  - Michel Etcheverry in Murder in the Cathedral (Meurtre dans la cathédrale)
  - Jean Lescot in Three on the Seesaw (Fausse adresse)
- 1996 : Jean-Paul Roussillon in Mademoiselle Colombe (Colombe)
  - Francis Lalanne in Mass Appeal (L'Affrontement)
  - Gérard Lartigau in Out of Order (Panique au Plazza)
  - François Marthouret in Gertrud
  - Frédéric van den Driessche in An Ideal Husband (Un mari idéal)
- 1997 : Robert Hirsch in Waiting for Godot (En attendant Godot)
  - Bernard Alane in Sylvia
  - Jean-Paul Bordes in A Flea in Her Ear (La Puce à l'oreille)
  - Jean-Pierre Darroussin in La Terrasse
  - Jean-Michel Dupuis in Waiting for Godot (En attendant Godot)
- 1998 : Maurice Barrier in Twelve Angry Men (Douze hommes en colère)
  - Marcel Cuvelier in Bel-Ami
  - Bernard Freyd in Twelve Angry Men (Douze hommes en colère)
  - Samuel Labarthe in Uncle Vanya (Oncle Vania)
  - Philippe Laudenbach in Cap and Bells (Le Bonnet du fou)
- 1999 : Michel Aumont in Rêver peut-être
  - Jean-Michel Dupuis in Les Portes du ciel
  - André Falcon in A Delicate Balance (Délicate Balance)
  - Alain MacMoy in Pour la galerie
  - Jacques Zabor in Mademoiselle Else

== 2000s ==
- 2000 : Marcel Cuvelier in My Father Was Right (Mon père avait raison)
  - Bernard Dhéran in Between Worlds (Hôtel des deux mondes)
  - Christian Hecq in La Main passe
  - Sam Karmann in Raisons de famille
  - François Lalande in Raisons de famille
- 2001 : Georges Wilson in Cat on a Hot Tin Roof (Une chatte sur un toit brûlant)
  - François Lalande in Master Class (Staline Mélodie)
  - Philippe Magnan in Les Directeurs
  - Jean Négroni in Marie Hasparren
  - Philippe Uchan in Glengarry Glen Ross
- 2002 : Maurice Chevit in Conversations with my Father (Conversations avec mon père)
  - Stéphane Hillel in It Runs in the Family (Impair et père)
  - Philippe Magnan in Elvire
  - Wojtek Pszoniak in The Shop Around the Corner (La boutique au coin de la rue)
  - Michel Vuillermoz in Madame Sans Gêne
- 2003 : Michel Duchaussoy in Phèdre
  - Roger Dumas in Hysteria
  - Vincent Elbaz in Hysteria
  - Gérard Loussine in Un petit jeu sans conséquence
  - José Paul in Un petit jeu sans conséquence
- 2004 : Thierry Frémont in Signé Dumas
  - Philippe Khorsand in L'Invité
  - Roland Marchisio in Portrait de famille
  - Jean-Michel Martial in Driving Miss Daisy (Miss Daisy et son chauffeur)
  - Chick Ortega in Things We Do for Love (L'Amour est enfant de salaud)
- 2005 : Maurice Chevit in Brooklyn Boy
  - Gérard Caillaud in Amadeus
  - Éric Elmosnino in Ivanov
  - José Paul in The Mistress of the Inn (La Locandiera)
  - Gilles Privat in To Whom It May Concern (Avis aux intéressés)
  - Michel Vuillermoz in Le Menteur
- 2006 : Roger Dumas in Moins 2
  - Didier Brice in La Sainte Catherine
  - Henri Courseaux in Pygmalion
  - Jean-Paul Farré in King Lear (Le Roi Lear)
  - Jérôme Kircher in King Lear (Le Roi Lear)
  - Jean-Pierre Lorit in Créanciers
- 2007 : Éric Ruf in Cyrano de Bergerac
  - Jean-Michel Dupuis in La Danse de l'Albatros
  - Jean-François Guilliet in Lady Windermere's Fan (L'Éventail de Lady Windermere)
  - Samuel Labarthe in The Caretaker (Le Gardien)
  - Jacques Marchand in Chocolat Piment
- 2008 : Gilles Privat in Hotel Paradiso (L'Hôtel du libre échange)
  - Didier Brice in Les Forains
  - Jean-Pierre Malo in Sight Unseen (En toute confiance)
  - Laurent Stocker in Juste la fin du monde
- 2009 : Roland Bertin in Coriolanus (Coriolan)
  - Sébastien Castro in Le Comique
  - Jean-Claude Durand in Le Jour se lève, Léopold !
  - Guillaume Gallienne in Fantasio
  - Arthur Jugnot in A Pig in a Poke (Chat en poche)
  - Sébastien Thiéry in Cochons d'Inde
  - Nicolas Vaude in Elle t'attend

== 2010s ==
- 2010 : Henri Courseaux in Twelfth Night (La Nuit des rois)
  - Xavier Gallais in Ordet (Ordet (La Parole))
  - José Paul in L'Illusion conjugale
  - Yves Pignot in Twelfth Night (La Nuit des rois)
  - Gilles Privat in The Girl from Maxim's (La Dame de chez Maxim)
  - Hugues Quester in Casimir and Caroline (Casimir et Caroline)
- 2011 : Guillaume Gallienne in A Fly in the Ointment (Un fil à la patte)
  - Maxime d'Aboville in Henri IV, le bien aimé
  - Jean-Michel Dupuis in Le Prénom
  - Thierry Hancisse in A Fly in the Ointment (Un fil à la patte)
  - Guillaume de Tonquédec in Le Prénom
  - Bernard Verley in Autumn Dream (Rêve d'automne)
- 2014 : Davy Sardou in Mass Appeal (L’Affrontement)
  - John Arnold in Perturbation
  - David Ayala in Le dernier jour du jeûne
  - Patrick Catalifo in Un temps de chien
  - Manuel Le Lièvre in The Winter's Tale (Le Conte d’hiver)
  - Stéphan Wojtowicz in A Monkey in Winter (Un singe en hiver)
- 2015 : Thierry Frémont in House of Cards (Les Cartes du pouvoir)
  - Urbain Cancelier in Le Système
  - Florian Choquart in La discreta enamorada (La Discrète amoureuse)
  - Romain Cottard in Comment vous racontez la partie
  - Arthur Igual in Le Capital et son Singe
  - Éric Laugérias in Nelson
- 2016 : Didier Brice in Taking Sides (À torts et à raisons)
  - Jean-Michel Dupuis in Le Mensonge
  - Pierre-François Garel in Who's Afraid of Virginia Woolf? (Qui a peur de Virginia Woolf ?)
  - Sébastien Thiéry in Momo
  - Thierry Lopez in Avanti !
- 2017 : Pierre Forest in Edmond
  - Jean-Paul Bordes in Vient de paraître
  - Jacques Fontanel in The Apartment (La Garçonnière)
  - Gilles Privat in Time and the Room (Le Temps et la chambre)
  - Patrick Raynal in La Louve
  - Didier Sandre in La caduta degli dei (Les Damnés)
- 2018 : Franck Desmedt in Adieu Monsieur Haffmann
  - Jean-Paul Comart in Michel-Ange et les fesses de Dieu
  - Vincent Deniard in Baby
  - Didier Sandre in Scapin the Schemer (Les Fourberies de Scapin)
  - François Siener in Michel-Ange et les fesses de Dieu
  - Bruno Solo in Baby
- 2019 : François Vincentelli in The Secretary Bird
  - Pierre Benoist in Kean
  - Sébastien Castro in Le Prénom
  - Olivier Claverie in La Dégustation
  - Jacques Fontanel in Kean
  - Christophe Montenez in Twelfth Night

== 2020s ==
- 2020 : Jean Franco in Plus haut que le ciel
  - Pierre Forest in Madame Zola
  - Jérémy Lopez in A Flea in Her Ear
  - Alexis Moncorgé in Red
  - Frédéric Pierrot in Opening Night
  - Stéphan Wojtowicz in The Fly
- 2022 : Nicolas Lumbreras in La Course des géants
  - Thomas Blanchard in La Seconde Surprise de l’amour
  - Jean-Paul Bordes in As You Like It
  - Andy Cocq in The Producers
  - François Marthouret in King Lear
  - Pascal Sangla in Stallone
- 2023 : Kamel Isker in Les Poupées persanes
  - Jérôme Kircher in Biographie : un jeu
  - Benjamin Lavernhe in The Lady from the Sea
  - Bernard Malaka in Glenn, naissance d'un prodige
  - Teddy Mélis in Le Voyage de Molière
  - Christophe Montenez in King Lear

== Multiple wins and nominations ==
Wins	Actors	Nominations
2	Jean-Paul Roussillon	3
2	Maurice Chevit; Thierry Frémont; Robert Hirsch	2

Nominations	Actors
6	Jean-Michel Dupuis
4	Gilles Privat
3	Jean-Paul Bordes; Didier Brice; Jean-Pierre Darroussin; Roger Dumas; Jean-Paul Farré; François Lalande; José Paul; Jean-Paul Roussillon; Didier Sandre
