= What's in a Name? (play) =

- Original language: French
- Written by: Matthieu Delaporte; Alexandre de la Patellière
- Characters: Vincent; Elisabeth; Pierre; Claude; Anna
- Genre: Comedy

Premiere
- Date: 2010
- Place: Théâtre Édouard VII, Paris

What's in a Name? (French: Le Prénom, literally "The Given Name") is a 2010 French comedy play by Matthieu Delaporte and Alexandre de la Patellière.

== Productions ==
The play premiered in 2010 at the Théâtre Édouard VII in Paris, France. The cast included Patrick Bruel as Vincent, Valérie Benguigui as Elisabeth, Jean-Michel Dupuis as Pierre, Guillaume de Tonquédec as Claude and Judith El Zein as Anna. The production was directed by Bernard Murat.

An English production was adapted and directed by Jeremy Sams at the Birmingham Repertory Theatre, produced by Adam Blanshay Productions in January 2017. starring Nigel Harman as Vincent, Sarah Hadland as Elizabeth (previously Elisabeth), Jamie Glover as Peter (previously Pierre), Olivia Poulet as Anna and Raymond Coulthard as Carl (previously Claude). The play's setting was changed from Paris to London. The play toured the UK in September 2019 starring Joe Thomas as Vincent, Laura Patch as Elizabeth, James Lance as Peter, Summer Strallen as Anna and Alex Gaumond as Carl.

== Critical reception ==
The Paris production received six Molière Award nominations, including Best Comedy, two Best Supporting Actor nominations for Jean-Michel Dupuis and Guillaume de Tonquédec, Best Supporting Actress for Valérie Benguigui, Best Playwright for Matthieu Delaporte and Alexandre de la Patellière and Best Director for Bernard Murat.

The Birmingham production received positive reviews, with five stars from WhatsOnStage, Behind The Arras and The Reviews Hub.

== Film adaptation ==
The play was adapted into a film in 2012, with screenplay and direction by the original authors Matthieu Delaporte and Alexandre de la Patellière.

The play was also adapted for German audiences in a 2018 film.
