= Molière Award for Best Actor =

Molière Award for Best Actor. Winners and nominees.

== 1980s ==
- 1987 : Philippe Clévenot in Elvire Jouvet 40
  - Michel Bouquet in The Imaginary Invalid (Le Malade imaginaire)
  - Jacques Dufilho in Staircase (L'Escalier)
  - Claude Rich in Let Us Do a Dream (Faisons un rêve)
  - Michel Serrault in The Miser (L'Avare)
- 1988 : Jacques Dufilho in Je ne suis pas Rappaport
  - Daniel Auteuil in La Double Inconstance
  - Michel Bouquet in The Imaginary Invalid (Le Malade Imaginaire)
  - Patrick Chesnais in A Day in the Death of Joe Egg (Joe Egg)
  - Roman Polanski in The Metamorphosis (La Métamorphose)
- 1989 : Gérard Desarthe in Hamlet
  - Sami Frey in Je me souviens
  - Bernard Freyd in Le Faiseur de Théâtre
  - Fabrice Luchini in Journey to the End of the Night (Voyage au bout de la nuit)
  - Laurent Terzieff in Henry IV (Henri IV)

== 1990s ==
- 1990 : Pierre Dux in Quelque part dans cette vie
  - Robert Hirsch in Moi Feuerbach
  - Francis Huster in The Plague (La Peste)
  - Claude Rich in Le Souper
  - Didier Sandre in The Lonely Way (Le Chemin solitaire)
- 1991 : Guy Tréjean in Heldenplatz
  - Daniel Auteuil in Les Fourberies de Scapin
  - Jean-Claude Dreyfus in La Nonna
  - Didier Sandre in The Break of Noon (Partage de midi)
  - Jacques Villeret in Double Bass (La Contrebasse)
  - Lambert Wilson in Eurydice
- 1992 : Henri Virlogeux in L'Antichambre
  - Gérard Desarthe in Célimène et le Cardinal
  - Stéphane Freiss in C'était bien
  - Marcel Maréchal in Mr Puntila and his Man Matti (Maître Puntila et son valet Matti)
  - Lambert Wilson in Ruy Blas
- 1993 : Michel Aumont in Macbeth
  - Bernard Giraudeau in The Little Black Book (L'Aide-mémoire)
  - Robert Hirsch in Une folie
  - Michel Serrault in Knock
  - Laurent Terzieff in Temps contre temps
- 1994 : Jean-Pierre Marielle in The Homecoming (Le Retour)
  - Gérard Desarthe in La Volupté de l'honneur
  - Thierry Fortineau in The Visitor (Le Visiteur)
  - Maurice Garrel in The Visitor (Le Visiteur)
  - Jean-Luc Moreau in Comment va le monde, Môssieu ? Il tourne, Môssieu !
  - Jacques Villeret in Le Dîner de Cons (Le Dîner de cons)
- 1995 : Pierre Meyrand in Business is business (Les Affaires sont les affaires)
  - Pierre Arditi in « Art »
  - Didier Galas in Ahmed le subtil ou Scapin 84
  - Fabrice Luchini in « Art »
  - Pierre Vaneck in « Art »
- 1996 : Didier Sandre in An Ideal Husband (Un mari idéal)
  - Michel Aumont in Décadence
  - Michel Duchaussoy in Le Refuge
  - André Dussollier in Scènes de la vie conjugale
  - Jean Piat dans L'Affrontement
- 1997 : Pierre Cassignard in The Venetian Twins (Les Jumeaux vénitiens)
  - Jean-François Balmer in Le Faiseur
  - Bernard Giraudeau in The Libertine (Le Libertin)
  - Francis Huster in Enigma Variations (Variations énigmatiques)
  - Robin Renucci in François Truffaut, correspondance
- 1998 : Michel Bouquet dans Les Côtelettes
  - Patrick Chesnais in Skylight
  - Jean-Claude Dreyfus in The Hygiene of the Assassin (Hygiène de l'assassin)
  - Patrick Préjean in Cyrano de Bergerac
  - Philippe Torreton in Les Fourberies de Scapin
- 1999 : Robert Hirsch in London Assurance (Le Bel Air de Londres)
  - Pierre Arditi in Rêver peut-être
  - Niels Arestrup in Copenhagen (Copenhague)
  - Roland Blanche in Tedy
  - Sami Frey in Pour un oui ou pour un non

== 2000s ==
- 2000 : Michel Aumont in Un sujet de Roman
  - Michel Bouquet in À torts et à raisons
  - Claude Brasseur in À torts et à raisons
  - Jacques Gamblin in Raisons de famille
  - Jean-Jacques Moreau in Accidental Death of an Anarchist (Mort accidentelle d'un anarchiste)
- 2001 : Simon Abkarian in Beast on the Moon (Une bête sur la lune)
  - Michel Aumont in Le grand retour de Boris S.
  - Jean-François Balmer in Novecento
  - Bernard Giraudeau in Becket or The Honor of God (Becket ou l'Honneur de Dieu)
  - Jacques Villeret in Jeffrey Bernard est souffrant
- 2002 : Jean-Paul Roussillon in Le Jardin des apparences
  - Pierre Arditi in The School for Wives (L'École des femmes)
  - Philippe Clay in Visites à Mister Green
  - André Dussollier in Monstres sacrés, sacrés monstres
  - Samuel Labarthe in The Shop Around the Corner (La boutique au coin de la rue)
- 2003 : Thierry Fortineau in Gros-Câlin
  - André Dussollier in Monstres sacrés, sacrés monstres
  - Robert Hirsch in Memoir (Sarah)
  - Gérard Jugnot in État critique
  - Claude Rich in Les Braises
- 2004 : Dominique Pinon in L'Hiver sous la table
  - Sami Frey in Je me souviens
  - Éric Métayer in Des cailloux plein les poches
  - Christian Pereira in Des cailloux plein les poches
  - Francis Perrin in Signé Dumas
- 2005 : Michel Bouquet in Exit the King (Le Roi se meurt)
  - Pierre Cassignard in The Mistress of the Inn (La Locandiera)
  - Éric Elmosnino in Peer Gynt
  - Stéphane Freiss in Brooklyn Boy
  - Alain Libolt in The Browning Version (La Version de Browning)
  - Pierre Vaneck in Ritter, Dene, Voss (Déjeuner chez Wittgenstein)
- 2006 : Jacques Sereys in Du coté de chez Proust
  - Niels Arestrup in Letters to a Young Poet (Lettres à un jeune poète)
  - Michel Piccoli in King Lear (Le Roi Lear)
  - Claude Rich in Le Caïman
  - Philippe Torreton in Richard III
  - Jean-Louis Trintignant in Moins 2
- 2007 : Robert Hirsch in The Caretaker (Le Gardien)
  - Michel Bouquet in The Miser (L'Avare)
  - Jacques Gamblin in Confidences trop intimes
  - Michel Piccoli in King Lear (Le Roi Lear)
  - Michel Vuillermoz in Cyrano de Bergerac
- 2008 : Michel Galabru in Les Chaussettes - opus 124
  - Clovis Cornillac in Hotel Paradiso (L'Hôtel du libre échange)
  - Jacques Frantz in Les riches reprennent confiance
  - Jérôme Kircher in La Petite Catherine de Heilbronn
- 2009 : Patrick Chesnais in Cochons d'Inde
  - Jacques Bonnaffé in L'Oral et Hardi
  - Claude Duparfait in Tartuffe
  - Samuel Labarthe in Très chère Mathilde
  - Claude Rich in Le Diable rouge
  - Wladimir Yordanoff in Coriolanus (Coriolan)

== 2010s ==
- 2010 : Laurent Terzieff in The Dresser (L'Habilleur) and Philoctetes (Philoctète)
  - Jean-Quentin Châtelain in Ode maritime
  - Jean-Claude Dreyfus in Le Mardi à Monoprix
  - Robert Hirsch in The Loving Maid (La Serva amorosa)
  - Daniel Russo in Les Autres
- 2011 : Christian Hecq in A Fly in the Ointment (Un fil à la patte)
  - Niels Arestrup in Diplomatie
  - Jean-François Balmer in Henri IV, le bien aimé
  - Jean-Claude Dreyfus in Le Mardi à Monoprix
  - André Dussollier in Diplomatie
  - Micha Lescot in The Chairs (Les Chaises)

In a public theater show

- 2014 : Philippe Torreton in Cyrano de Bergerac
  - Nicolas Bouchaud in The Misanthrope
  - Olivier Martin-Salvan in Pantagruel
  - Stanislas Nordey in Über die Dörfer

In a private theater show

- 2014 : Robert Hirsch in Le Père
  - Daniel Auteuil in Nos Femmes
  - Clovis Cornillac in La Contrebasse
  - Michel Fau in The Misanthrope

In a public theater show

- 2015 : André Dussollier in Novecento : Pianiste
  - Philippe Caubère in La Danse du diable
  - Micha Lescot in Ivanov
  - Olivier Martin-Salvan in Pantagruel

In a private theater show

- 2015 : Maxime d'Aboville in The Servant
  - François Berléand in Deux hommes tout nus
  - Claude Brasseur in La Colère du Tigre
  - Nicolas Briançon in Venus in Fur

In a public theater show

- 2016 : Charles Berling in A View from the Bridge
  - Christian Hecq in Twenty Thousand Leagues Under the Seas
  - Denis Lavant in Scapin the Schemer
  - François Marthouret in Business is business
  - Michel Vuillermoz in Cyrano de Bergerac

In a private theater show

- 2016 : Wladimir Yordanoff in Who's Afraid of Virginia Woolf?
  - Michel Aumont in King Lear
  - Michel Bouquet in Taking Sides
  - Michel Fau in Cactus Flower

In a public theater show

- 2017 : Philippe Caubère in Le Bac 68
  - Patrick Catalifo in Timon of Athens
  - Laurent Natrella in Children of a Lesser God
  - Denis Podalydès in The Damned

In a private theater show

- 2017 : Jean-Pierre Bacri in Les Femmes Savantes
  - Pierre Arditi in Le Cas Sneijder
  - Jean-Pierre Bouvier in The Browning Version
  - Guillaume de Tonquédec in The Apartment

In a public theater show

- 2018 : Jacques Gamblin in 1 heure 23’14” et 7 centièmes
  - Philippe Caubère in Adieu Ferdinand !
  - Benjamin Lavernhe in Scapin the Schemer
  - Philippe Torreton in Bluebird

In a private theater show

- 2018 : Jean-Pierre Darroussin in Art
  - Yvan Attal in The Son
  - Grégori Baquet in Adieu monsieur Haffmann
  - Vincent Dedienne in The Game of Love and Chance

In a public theater show

- 2019 : François Morel in J’ai des doutes
  - Mathieu Amalric in The Collection
  - Grégori Baquet in Hamlet
  - Denis Podalydès in Twelfth Night

In a private theater show

- 2019 : Benoit Solès in La Machine de Turing
  - Nicolas Briançon in The Secretary Bird
  - Bernard Campan in La Dégustation
  - Lambert Wilson in The Misanthrope

== 2020s ==
In a public theater show

- 2020 : Christian Hecq in The Fly
  - Simon Abkarian in Électre des bas-fonds
  - Philippe Torreton in Life of Galileo
  - Michel Vuillermoz in Angels in America

In a private theater show

- 2020 : Niels Arestrup in Red
  - Édouard Baer in Les Élucubrations d’un homme soudain frappé par la grâce
  - Sébastien Castro in J’ai envie de toi
  - Guillaume de Tonquédec in The Seven Year Itch

In a public theater show

- 2022 : Jacques Gamblin in Harvey
  - Pierre Guillois in Les Gros patinent bien
  - Olivier Martin-Salvan in Les Gros patinent bien
  - Jacques Weber in King Lear

In a private theater show

- 2022 : Maxime d'Aboville in Berlin Berlin
  - Pierre Arditi in Fallait pas le dire !
  - Michel Boujenah in The Miser
  - André Marcon in Avant la retraite

In a public theater show

- 2023 : Christian Hecq in Le Bourgeois gentilhomme
  - Jacques Gamblin in HOP !
  - Denis Podalydès in King Lear
  - Laurent Stocker in The Miser

In a private theater show

- 2023 : Thierry Lopez in Oublie-moi
  - Michel Fau in Lorsque l'enfant parait
  - Sébastien Castro in Une idée géniale
  - Jean Franco in La Délicatesse

== Multiple wins and nominations ==
Wins	Actors	Nominations
3	Robert Hirsch	7
3	Christian Hecq	4
2	Michel Bouquet	7
2	Michel Aumont	5
2	Jacques Gamblin	5
2	Maxime d'Aboville	2

Nominations	Actors
7	Michel Bouquet; Robert Hirsch
5	Pierre Arditi; Michel Aumont; André Dussollier; Jacques Gamblin; Claude Rich; Philippe Torreton
4	Niels Arestrup; Jean-Claude Dreyfus; Christian Hecq
3	Daniel Auteuil; Jean-François Balmer; Philippe Caubère; Patrick Chesnais; Gérard Desarthe; Michel Fau; Sami Frey; Bernard Giraudeau; Olivier Martin-Salvan; Denis Podalydès; Didier Sandre; Laurent Terzieff; Jacques Villeret; Michel Vuillermoz; Lambert Wilson
