= René Clemencic =

Austrian classical musician (1928–2022)

René Clemencic (27 February 1928 – 8 March 2022) was an Austrian composer, conductor, harpsichordist, clavichordist and recorder player.

== Biography ==
Born in Vienna, Austria, Clemencic was educated at the Vienna University and studied further in France, the Netherlands and West Germany. He was director of the Capella Musica Antiqua and of the Drama Musicum in Vienna.

In 1958 he founded Musica Antiqua (known after 1959 as Ensemble Musica Antiqua) to perform early music on period instruments. Later, in 1968, he founded the Clemencic Consort.

Clemencic died on 8 March 2022, at the age of 94.

== Compositions ==
- Meraviglia 1969
- Molière Film music for the film by Ariane Mnouchkine (1978)
- Missa Mundi mass in Latin, for five voices and orchestra (1981)
- Unus Mundus (1986)
- Drachenkampf ballet (1987)
- Kabbala Oratorio in Hebrew (1992)
- Der Berg chamber opera (1993)
- Apokalypsis Oratorio on the Greek text of the Revelation of John (1996)
- Stabat Mater - (2001)
- Monduntergang - Operelle for sirene Operntheater (2007)
- Nachts unter der steinernen Brücke - chamber opera for sirene Operntheater (2009)
- Harun und Dschafar - chamber opera for sirene Operntheater (2011)
- Gilgamesch - Oratorio in German for sirene Operntheater (2015)

== Selected recordings ==
- Carmina Burana, 5 LPs Harmonia Mundi France (HM B385) (LP1: HM335 (rec. 1974 / rel. 1975), LP2: HM336 (rec. 1974 / rel. 1975), LP3: HM337 (rec. 1975 / rel. 1976), LP4: HM338 (rec. 1976 / rel. 1976), LP5: HM339 (rec. 1977 / rel. 1978)) / 3CDs Harmonia Mundi France, 1990 (190336.38)
