= Benguigui =

Benguigui is a Jewish surname commonly associated with people of North African Jewish descent. Notable people with the surname include:

- Jean Benguigui (born 1944), French actor
- Valérie Benguigui (1965–2013), French actress
- Yamina Benguigui (born 1955), French film director and politician (she is Muslim and carries her Jewish husband's surname)
- Patrick Bruel, born Patrick Benguigui
- Flore Benguigui, French vocalist and former lead vocalist of the band L'Impératrice
