= Guillaume de Tonquédec =

French actor (born 1966)

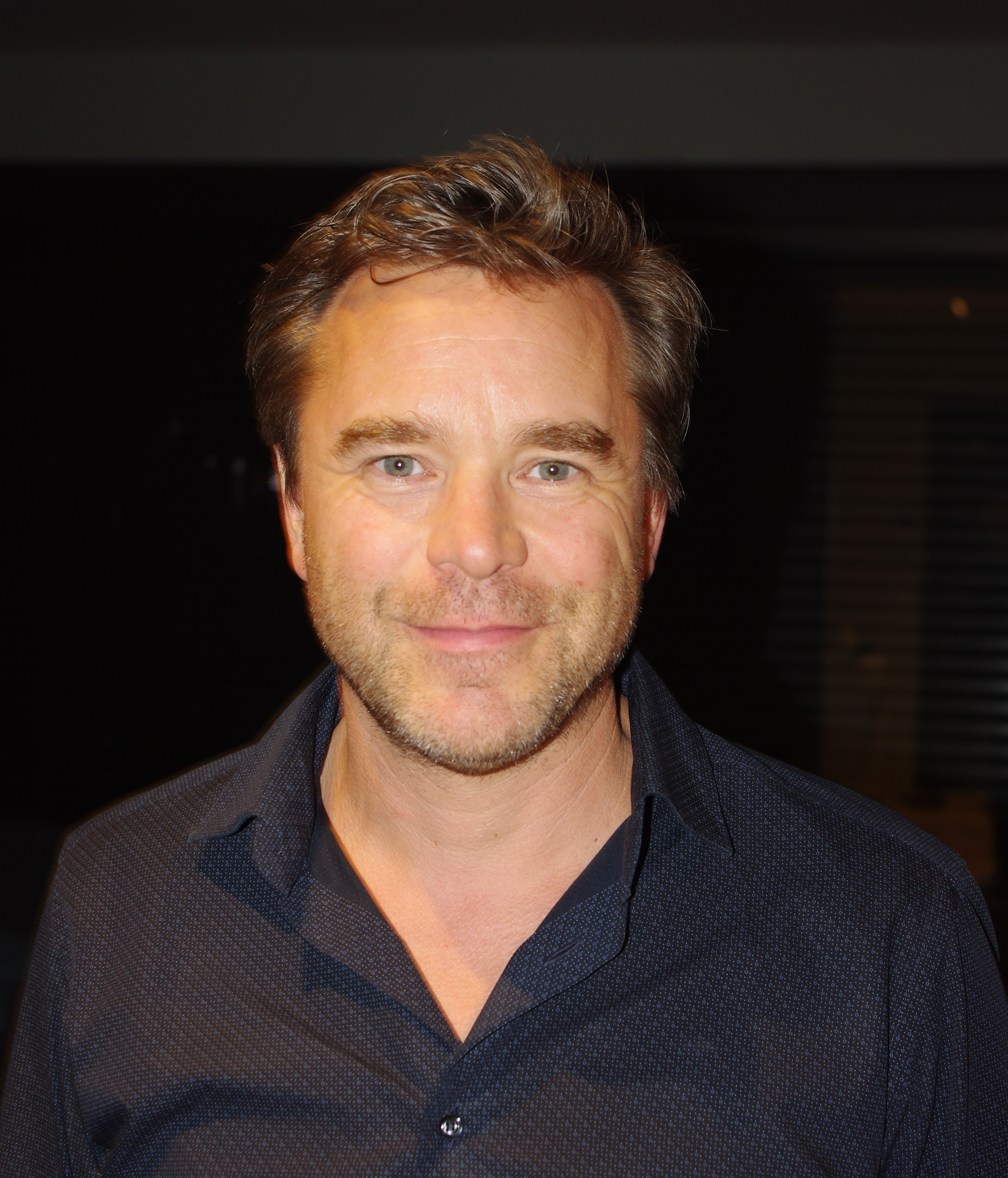
- Guillaume de Tonquédec in 2017
- Born: Guillaume Emmanuel Marie de Quengo de Tonquédec; 18 October 1966 (age 59); Paris, France
- Occupation: Actor
- Years active: 1986–present
- Spouse: Christèle Marchal
- Children: 3

Guillaume Emmanuel Marie de Quengo de Tonquédec (French pronunciation: [ɡijom də tɔ̃kedɛk]; born 18 October 1966) is a French stage, television and film actor. He first became known in his homeland for his role as Jules in Tableau d'honneur (1992) and as Renaud Lepic in the TV series Fais pas ci, fais pas ça (2007–2017) on France 2, before winning the César Award for Best Supporting Actor for his performance in What's in a Name? in 2013.

De Tonquédec was made a Knight in the Ordre des Arts et des Lettres in 2015 by Minister of Culture Fleur Pellerin.

== Career ==
A native of Paris, Guillaume de Tonquédec grew up in Louveciennes. He studied economics and English at Paris Nanterre University until he joined the Conservatoire national supérieur d'art dramatique in Paris in 1986 for a three-year programme. In 1989, he began his stage career with a national tour in John Millington Synge's The Playboy of the Western World.

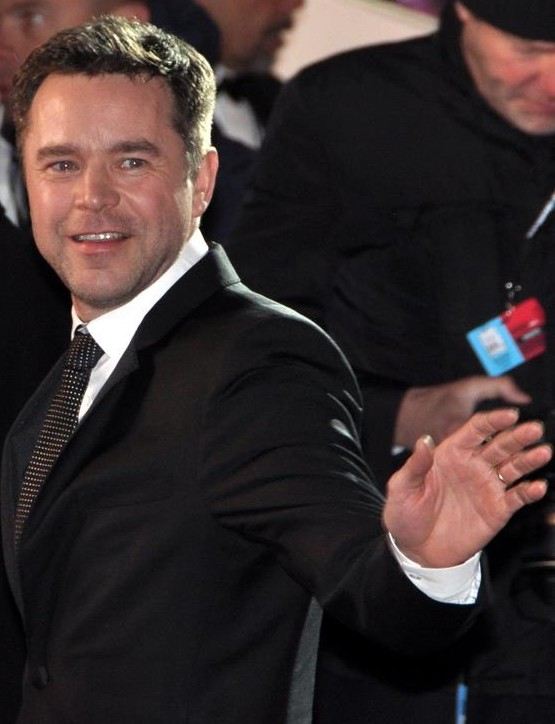
De Tonquédec at the 38th César Awards

He gained recognition in film in Krzysztof Kieslowski's The Double Life of Veronique (1991), followed by his first leading role as Claude Jade's son Jules Martin in List of Merite (1992). In 1996, he starred in Raúl Ruiz's Three Lives and Only One Death.

In 2007, De Tonquédec started starring in the successful TV series Fais pas ci, fais pas ça, which propelled him to stardom in France alongside fellow actors Valérie Bonneton, Isabelle Gélinas and Bruno Salomone. In 2013, he won the César Award for Best Supporting Actor for his role as Claude Gatignol in What's in a Name?. Co-star Valérie Benguigui won the César Award for Best Supporting Actress for her role as Élisabeth Garraud-Larchet. De Tonquédec had been nominated two years prior for the Molière Award for Best Supporting Actor for the same role he held in the eponymous play in Paris's Théâtre Édouard VII, upon which the film was based.

He was subsequently nominated twice for the Molière Award for Best Actor, in 2017 and 2020.

== Personal life ==
Guillaume de Tonquédec, whose ancestors owned the Château de Tonquédec in Brittany from 1626 to 1801 and again from 1828 until 1878, is married to interior designer Christèle Marchal. They reside in L'Étang-la-Ville, Yvelines. They have three children: Amaury, Timothé and Victoire.

== Filmography ==
Year	Title	Role	Director	Notes
1986	Cours privé	A student	Pierre Granier-Deferre	
1986	On a volé Charlie Spencer!		Francis Huster	
1987	Travelling avant		Jean-Charles Tacchella	
1988	Civilisations	Onias	Patrick Meunier	TV mini-series
1989	Deux	Olivier Muller	Claude Zidi	
1989	Mama, There's a Man in Your Bed	Nicole's lover	Coline Serreau	
1989	Les nuits révolutionnaires	François	Charles Brabant	TV mini-series
1991	The Double Life of Véronique	Serge	Krzysztof Kieślowski	
1991	Faux frère		Vincent Martorana	TV movie
1991	Les enfants de la plage	Benjamin	Williams Crépin	TV movie
1992	List of Merite	Jules Martin	Charles Nemes	
1995	La vie de Marianne	Mr. Villot	Benoît Jacquot	TV movie
1996	Three Lives and Only One Death	Piotr	Raúl Ruiz	
1996	Notre homme	Eric	Élisabeth Rappeneau	TV movie
1998	Le comptoir	Paul	Sophie Tatischeff	
1998	Nestor Burma	A cop	Philippe Venault	TV series (1 episode)
1998	Une femme d'honneur	Vidal	Marion Sarraut	TV series (1 episode)
1999	La voleuse de Saint-Lubin	Mr. Mangeot	Claire Devers	
1999-2000	Cap des Pins	Jean	Bernard Dumont, Pascal Heylbroeck, ...	TV series (30 episodes)
1999-2001	Chère Marianne	Dimitri	Bernard Uzan	TV series (3 episodes)
2000	Lise et André	The young religious	Denis Dercourt	
2000	Most Promising Young Actress	SNCF employee	Gérard Jugnot	
2001	Le marathon du lit	Jean-Claude	Bruno Gantillon	TV movie
2003	Ruby & Quentin	The hospital intern	Francis Veber	
2003	Mon papa à moi		Stefan Le Lay	Short
2003	Une femme d'honneur	François Guéret	David Delrieux	TV series (1 episode)
2004	Navarro	Jean-Baptiste	Jean Sagols	TV series (1 episode)
2005	Les Parrains	Minister Gatignol	Frédéric Forestier	
2005	Le baiser		Stefan Le Lay	Short
2005	Au bar des amis		Olivier Monot	Short
2006	Sœur Thérèse.com	Bertrand Tardy	Christophe Douchand	TV series (1 episode)
2006-08	Commissaire Cordier	Thomas Sorensen	Bertrand Van Effenterre, Eric Summer, ...	TV series (10 episodes)
2007	La maison	The lawyer	Manuel Poirier	
2007	Avocats & associés	Franck Bazin	Alexandre Pidoux	TV series (1 episode)
2007–17	Fais pas ci, fais pas ça	Renaud Lepic	Laurent Dussaux, Pascal Chaumeil, ...	TV series (68 episodes); Nominated - Monte-Carlo Television Festival: Outstanding Actor in a Comedy Series (2011); Nominated - Monte-Carlo Television Festival; Outstanding Actor in a Comedy Series (2012); Nominated - Monte-Carlo Television Festival; Outstanding Actor in a Comedy Series (2013)
2008	Love Me No More	Sébastien	Jean Becker	
2008	Let's Talk About the Rain	Stéphane	Agnès Jaoui	
2008	Le nouveau monde	Sinon	Étienne Dhaene	TV movie
2008	Complot d'amateurs	Jean-Jacques Melfort	Vincent Monnet	TV movie
2008	Sur le fil	Éric Mignon	Bruno Garcia	TV series (1 episode)
2009	Camping Paradis	Paul	Philippe Proteau	TV series (1 episode)
2009	Louis la Brocante	Arnaud Pavan	Pierre Sisser	TV series (1 episode)
2010	Les meilleurs amis du monde	Édouard Teston	Julien Rambaldi	
2010	Camus	Michel Gallimard	Laurent Jaoui	TV movie
2010	Les diamants de la victoire	Count of Jobourg	Vincent Monnet	TV movie
2010	Famille d'accueil	Julien	Bertrand Arthuys	TV series (1 episode)
2010	Profilage	The doc	Eric Summer, Pascal Lahmani, ...	TV series (12 episodes)
2011	Mike	Mr. Lejeune	Lars Blumers	
2011	Qui a envie d'être aimé?	The good student	Anne Giafferi	
2011	L'autre	The neighbor	Julie Sellier	Short
2012	What's in a Name?	Claude Gatignol	Alexandre de La Patellière & Matthieu Delaporte	César Award for Best Supporting Actor
2013	The Scapegoat	Sainclair	Nicolas Bary	
2014	SMS	Laurent	Gabriel Julien-Laferrière	
2014	Barbecue	Yves	Éric Lavaine	
2014	Divin Enfant	Eric	Olivier Doran	
2015	Families	Jean-Michel Varenne	Jean-Paul Rappeneau	
2015	Summer Nights	Michel Aubertin	Mario Fanfani	
2015	The Student and Mister Henri	Paul Voizot	Ivan Calbérac	
2016	La vie à l'envers	Stéphane	Anne Giafferi	TV movie
2017	Coexister	Benoît	Fabrice Eboué	
2017	Bonne Pomme	The mayor	Florence Quentin	
2018	Game On		Houdia Ponty	Short
2018	Speakerine	Pierre Beauval	Laurent Tuel	TV mini-series
2019	Roxane	Raymond Leroux	Mélanie Auffret	
2019	Let's Dance	Rémi	Ladislas Chollat	
2019	Place des victoires	Bruno	Yoann Guillouzouic	
2020	L'esprit de famille	Alexandre	Éric Besnard	
2020	Les blagues de Toto	Jérôme	Pascal Bourdiaux	
2020	Y aura-t-il Noël à Noël?	Renaud Lepic	Michel Leclerc	TV movie
2020	Ils étaient dix	Gilles Delfour	Pascal Laugier	TV mini-series
2021	Delicious	Hyacinthe	Éric Besnard	
2021	Flashback	The cop	Caroline Vigneaux	
2021	J'irai au bout de mes rêves	Patrick	Stéphanie Pillonca	TV movie
2021	Germinal	Mr Hennebeau	David Hourrègue	TV mini-series
2021	Une affaire française	Étienne Sesmat	Christophe Lamotte	TV mini-series
2022	Plancha	Yves	Éric Lavaine	
2022	Le temps des secrets	Joseph Pagnol	Christophe Barratier	
2023	Lie with Me	Stéphane Belcourt	Olivier Peyon	
2023	Coup de chance	Marcel Blanc	Woody Allen	
2023	Les blagues de Toto 2	Jérôme	Pascal Bourdiaux	
2023	Avenir	Henri Sax	Frank Bellocq	TV mini-series
2023	Filles du Feu	Tristan d'Urtubie	Magaly Richard-Serrano	TV mini-series
2024	Cat's Eyes	Dalembert	Alexandre Laurent	TV series
2025	Dracula	Dumont	Luc Besson	French blockbuster

== Theater ==
Year	Title	Author	Director	Notes
1988	The Way of the World	William Congreve	Gérard Watkins	
1989-90	The Playboy of the Western World	John Millington Synge	Jacques Nichet	
1990-91	Life Is a Dream	Pedro Calderón de la Barca	Jacques Nichet	
1992	The School for Wives	Molière	Jean-Luc Boutté	
1993	The Taming of the Shrew	William Shakespeare	Jérôme Savary	
1994	The Misanthrope	Molière	Jacques Weber	
1994-95	Tartuffe	Molière	Jacques Weber	
1996	The Venetian Twins	Carlo Goldoni	Gildas Bourdet	
1997	Després de la pluja	Sergi Belbel	Marion Bierry	
1998	Le Sénateur Fox	Luigi Lunari	Jean-Luc Tardieu	
1998	Time of My Life	Alan Ayckbourn	Alain Sachs	
2000	Jeffrey Bernard Is Unwell	Keith Waterhouse	Jean-Michel Ribes	
2003	Hedda Gabler	Henrik Ibsen	Roman Polanski	
2003	Les Directeurs	Daniel Besse	Étienne Bierry	
2004-05	Le Sénateur Fox	Luigi Lunari	Jean-Luc Tardieu	
2005	Le Meilleur Professeur	Daniel Besse	Stéphane Hillel	
2006	Hedda Gabler	Henrik Ibsen	Roman Polanski	
2006-07	La Sainte Catherine	Stephan Wojtowicz	José Paul & Agnès Boury	
2006-08	Le Jardin	Brigitte Buc	Jean Bouchaud	
2010-11	What's in a Name?	Matthieu Delaporte & Alexandre de La Patellière	Bernard Murat	Nominated - Molière Award for Best Supporting Actor
2014	Un dîner d’adieu	Matthieu Delaporte & Alexandre de La Patellière	Bernard Murat	
2016	Un dîner d’adieu	Matthieu Delaporte & Alexandre de La Patellière	Bernard Murat	
2017-18	La Vraie Vie	Fabrice Roger-Lacan	Bernard Murat	
2017-18	The Apartment	Billy Wilder & I. A. L. Diamond	José Paul	Nominated - Molière Award for Best Actor
2019-20	The Seven Year Itch	George Axelrod	Stéphane Hillel	Nominated - Molière Award for Best Actor
2022-23	Times Square	Clément Koch	José Paul	

== Book ==
- Les Portes de mon imaginaire, Éditions de L'Observatoire, 2018
