= François Lalande =

French actor (1930–2020)

- Born: 29 November 1930; Mostaganem, French Algeria
- Died: 1 September 2020 (aged 89); Paris, France
- Occupation: Actor

François Lalande (29 November 1930 – 1 September 2020) was a French actor. He had performed in the theatre, on television, and films.

== Filmography ==
=== Cinema ===
- Un jour à Paris (1962)
- Yo Yo (1965)
- Le Gang (1977)
- La Question (1977)
- Herbie Goes to Monte Carlo (1977)
- On peut le dire sans se fâcher (1978)
- Rape of Love (1978)
- Le beaujolais nouveau est arrivé (1978)
- French Postcards (1979)
- La Gueule de l'autre (1979)
- Rien ne va plus (1979)
- Que les gros salaires lèvent le doigt ! (1982)
- Bras de fer (1985)
- La Galette du roi (1986)
- Dangerous Liaisons (1988)
- La Révolution française (1989)
- Milena (1991)
- Aux yeux du monde (1991)
- Impromptu (1991)
- The Hour of the Pig (1993)
- Les Visiteurs (1993)
- La Vengeance d'une blonde (1994)
- The Libertine (2000)

=== Television ===
- Sarcelles-sur-Mer (1974)
- Les Rebelles (1977)
- Mamma Rosa ou la Farce du destin (1978)
- Les Procès témoins de leur temps (1978)
- Les Héritiers : Photos de famille (1978)
- Les Cinq Dernières Minutes (1979)
- L'Hôtel du libre échange (1979)
- L'Étouffe grand-mère (1981)
- Arcole ou la Terre promise (1981)
- Julien Fontanes, magistrat (1982)
- La Nuit du général Boulanger (1982)
- Péchés originaux : On ne se quittera jamais (1984)
- L'Appartement (1984)
- L'Ami Maupassant (1986)
- Samedi, dimanche, lundi (1986)
- Les Aventuriers du Nouveau-Monde (1986)
- Hallmark Hall of Fame : The Tenth Man (1988)
- Douce France (1989)
- Un conte des deux villes (1989)
- Coma dépassé (1990)
- Ferbac : Mariage mortel (1991)
- Riviera (1991)
- Tattle Tale (1992)
- Fortitude (1994)
- La Poursuite du vent (1998)
- Maigret : Mon ami Maigret (2001)
- Ainsi soient-ils (2012)

== Awards ==
- Nomination for the Molière Award for Best Supporting Actor in Home (1989)
- Nomination for the Molière Award for Best Supporting Actor in Raisons de famille (2000)
- Nomination for the Molière Award for Best Supporting Actor in Staline Mélodie (2001)
