= Marie-Françoise Audollent =

French actress (1943–2008)

- Born: 22 May 1943; Clermont-Ferrand, Puy-de-Dôme, France
- Died: 30 March 2008 (aged 64); Lyon, France
- Years active: 1978-2009

Marie-Françoise Audollent (French: [maʁi fʁɑ̃swaz odɔlɑ̃]; 22 May 1943 – 30 March 2008) was a French actress. She was known for her role in The Da Vinci Code. Her other roles have included Éloge de l'amour and Le Comte de Monte Cristo.

== Filmography ==
Year	Title	Role	Notes
1978	Molière	La Forest - La servante	
1988	Prisonnières	Religieuse	
1991	Milena		
1996	Ma femme me quitte		
1996	Le Cri de la soie	Surveillante prison 1914	
1998	On va nulle part et c'est très bien	La mère	
1998	Zonzon	Madame Gouvier	
1998	Le Comte de Monte Cristo	Mere Superieure	4 episodes
2001	In Praise of Love		
2006	The Da Vinci Code	Sister Sandrine	
2008	La Jeune Fille et les Loups	La femme aveugle	
2009	Sois sage	Mme Millot	(final film role)
