= Pierre Cassignard =

French actor (1965–2021)

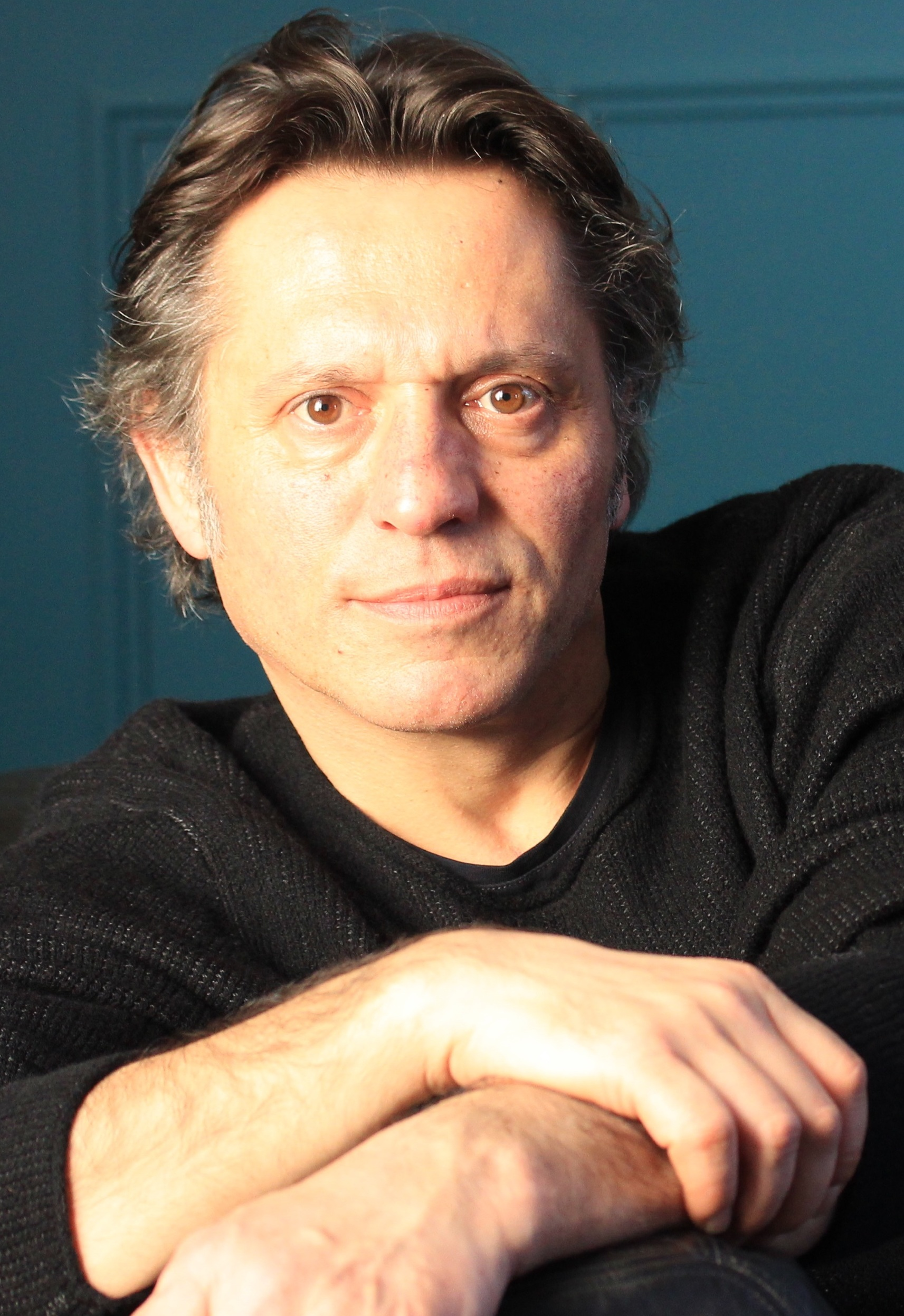
- Cassignard in 2017
- Born: 19 December 1965; Sainte-Foy-la-Grande, Gironde, France
- Died: 20 December 2021 (aged 56)
- Occupation: Actor
- Years active: 1987–2021

Pierre Cassignard (19 December 1965 – 20 December 2021) was a French stage and screen actor.

== Early life ==
Pierre Cassignard was born in Sainte-Foy-la-Grande in Grionde, France, on 19 December 1965. In the early 1980s, he moved to Paris to study theater, but wound up working in a production a few days later. He landed his first role in the play House & Garden in 1987. Television and Film followed quickly when he was cast in the TV series Haute Tension in 1988.

Cassignard was well received. In 1996, he won the coveted Molière for Best Actor in the Carlo Goldoni play The Venetian Twins. He was also nominated as Best Newcomer for the same role. A second Best Actor nomination came in 2005, again for a Carlo Goldoni play, the Mistress of the Inn.

== Theater ==
Year	Title	Role	Author	Director	Notes
1987	House & Garden		Alan Ayckbourn	Stuart Seide	
1991	Un pli		Daniel Mesguich	Daniel Mesguich	
1995	L'Illusion Comique		Pierre Corneille	Arlette Téphany	
1995	Des jours entiers des nuits entières		Xavier Durringer	Stéphanie Chévara	
1996	The Venetian Twins		Carlo Goldoni	Gildas Bourdet	Molière Award for Best Actor; Nominated - Molière Award for Best Newcomer
1997	Bel Ami		Guy de Maupassant	Didier Long	
1999	De si bons amis		Joe Penhall	Stéphan Meldegg	
2000	On ne refait pas l'avenir		Anne-Marie Etienne	Anne-Marie Etienne	
2003	Uncle Vanya		Anton Chekhov	Julie Brochen	
2004	Three Days of Rain		Richard Greenberg	Jean-Marie Besset & Gilbert Desveaux	
2004	Devinez Qui ? Dix; Petits Nègres		Agatha Christie	Bernard Murat	
2005	The Mistress of the Inn		Carlo Goldoni	Alain Sachs	Nominated - Molière Award for Best Actor
2006	Adultères		Woody Allen	Benoît Lavigne	
2008	Good Canary		Zach Helm	John Malkovich	
2008	Un couple idéal		Jean-Marie Besset	Jean-Luc Revol	
2010	On purge bébé		Georges Feydeau	Gildas Bourdet (2)	
2010	The Lover		Harold Pinter	Didier Long (2)	
2010	Léonie est en avance		Georges Feydeau	Gildas Bourdet (3)	
2011	Madame Sans-Gêne		Victorien Sardou	Alain Sachs (2)	
2012	Festen		Thomas Vinterberg	Daniel Benoin	
2012	Le kiné de Carcassonne		Jean-Marie Besset	Gilbert Désveaux (2)	
2013	The Elephant Song		Nicolas Billon	Bruno Dupuis	
2013–14	Hollywood		Ron Hutchinson	Daniel Colas	
2015–16	Un amour qui ne finit pas		André Roussin	Michel Fau	
2016	Darius		Jean-Benoît Patricot	Anne Bouvier	

== Filmography ==
Year	Title	Role	Director	Notes
1988	Haute Tension	Nicolas	Patrick Dromgoole	TV series (1 episode)
1990	Le provincial	Pierre	Christian Gion	
1994	Maigret	Henri	David Delrieux	TV series (1 episode)
1994	Les Cordier, juge et flic	Vincent	Alain Bonnot	TV series (1 episode)
1995	A French Woman	Inspector	Régis Wargnier	
1996	Un week-end en Bourgogne	Simon	Alain Bonnot (2)	TV movie
1996	Combats de femme	Cyril	Laurent Jaoui	TV series (1 episode)
1997	Seventh Heaven	Etienne	Benoît Jacquot	
1997	Vive la république		Éric Rochant	
1997	Viens jouer dans la cour des grands	Antony	Caroline Huppert	TV movie
1997	Une soupe aux herbes sauvages	Rodolphe	Alain Bonnot (3)	TV movie
1998	Deux flics	Antoine Achard	Laurent Heynemann	TV series (2 episodes)
1999	Tôt ou tard	Julien	Anne-Marie Etienne	
1999	Le sourire du clown	The violent man	Éric Besnard	
2000	Passion assassine	Eric	Didier Delaître	TV movie
2000	Jeanne, Marie et les autres	Auguste	Jacques Renard	TV movie
2001	De toute urgence	Martin	Philippe Triboit	TV movie
2001	Agathe et le grand magasin	Deboz	Bertrand Arthuys	TV movie
2001	Les ex font la loi	Guillaume	Philippe Triboit (2)	TV movie
2002	Vivante	Louis	Sandrine Ray	
2002	L'héritière	Pierre Valec	Bernard Rapp	TV movie
2002	La torpille	Thierry Dalbi	Luc Boland	TV movie
2003	Violence des échanges en milieu tempéré	Thierry Molinaro	Jean-Marc Moutout	
2003	La bastide bleue	Vincent Rivière	Benoît d'Aubert	TV movie
2003	Il court, il court, le furet...	Pierre	Didier Grousset	TV movie
2003	Le Don fait à Catchaires	Moshé Rosenberg	William Gotesman	TV movie
2003	Faux frères, vrais jumeaux	Alexandre & Jérôme Maricacci	Daniel Losset	TV movie
2003	Droit d'asile	Paul	Jean Marboeuf	TV movie
2003	L'adorable femme des neiges	François Marquand	Jean-Marc Vervoort	TV movie
2003	Les Cordier, juge et flic	Julien Le Floch	Michaëla Watteaux	TV series (1 episode)
2005	Russian Dolls	Platane	Cédric Klapisch	
2005	Tout pour plaire	Benoit	Cécile Telerman	
2005	Joséphine, ange gardien	Antoine	Sylvie Ayme	TV series (1 episode)
2005	Vérité oblige	Denis Servat	Dominique Ladoge	TV series (1 episode)
2006	Le proc	David Chauvot	Jean-Marc Seban	TV series (1 episode)
2007	J'aurais voulu être un danseur	Guy	Alain Berliner	
2007	Demandez la permission aux enfants	David	Eric Civanyan	
2007	Un juge sous influence	Raoul Duval	Jean Marboeuf (2)	TV movie
2007	The Mistress of the Inn	Knight of Ripafratta	Patrick Czaplinski	TV movie
2008	A Man and His Dog	Jean-Luc	Francis Huster	
2008	Roue de secours	Laurent / Laurence Ribouche	Williams Crépin	TV movie
2008	L'affaire Finaly	Moïse Keller	Fabrice Genestal	TV movie
2008	Scénarios contre les discriminations	The real estate	Artus de Penguern	TV series (1 episode)
2008	La cour des grands	Bertrand Clavery	Christophe Barraud	TV series (1 episode)
2009	Les tricheurs	Christian Fournier	Benoît d'Aubert (2)	TV series (1 episode)
2010	Le grand restaurant	A Client	Gérard Pullicino	TV movie
2010	Notre Dame des Barjots	Marc	Arnaud Sélignac	TV movie
2010	Empreintes criminelles	Julien Valour	Christian Bonnet	TV series (6 episodes)
2011	The Conquest	Frédéric Lefebvre	Xavier Durringer	
2011	Jeanne Devère	Pascal Pia	Marcel Bluwal	TV movie
2011	Boulevard du Palais	Jean Mathieu	Christian Bonnet (2)	TV series (1 episode)
2012	Eléonore, l'intrépide	Tristan	Ivan Calbérac	TV movie
2012	Je retourne chez ma mère	François	Williams Crépin (2)	TV movie
2012	Toussaint Louverture	Étienne de Laveaux	Philippe Niang	TV mini-series
2012	Chambre 327	Romain Dechassey	Benoît d'Aubert (3)	TV mini-series
2013	Interdits d'enfants	Antoine	Jacques Renard (2)	TV movie
2015	The Student and Mister Henri		Ivan Calbérac (2)	
2015	Stavisky, l'escroc du siècle	Guillaume Faure	Claude-Michel Rome	TV movie
2015	Murders at Étretat	Pierre Vergnault	Laurence Katrian	TV series (1 episode)
2015	Le sang de la vigne	Jérémie Casenove	Régis Musset	TV series (1 episode)
2016	Section de recherches	Stanislas Meyer	Jean-Marc Thérin	TV series (1 episode)
2017	The law of Pauline	Christophe	Philippe Venault	TV movie

== Death ==
Monsieur Cassignard suffered from cancer prior to his death. He died on 20 December 2021, just one day after his 56th birthday.
