= Samuel Labarthe =

French-Swiss actor (born 1962)

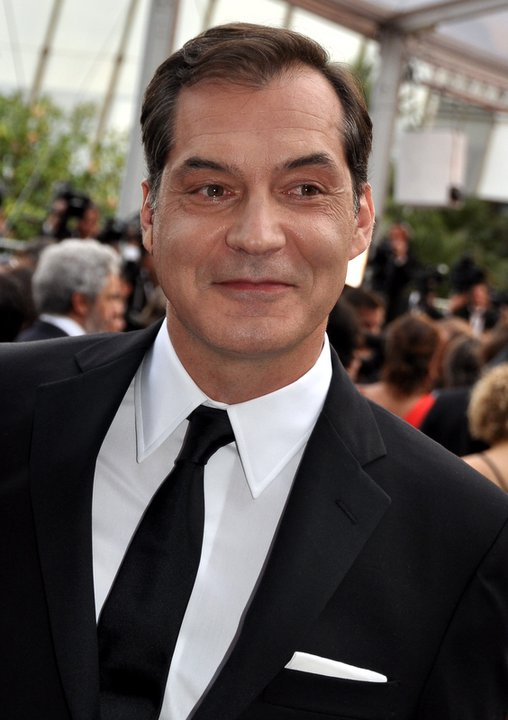
- Labarthe in 2011
- Born: 16 May 1962 (age 64); Geneva, Switzerland
- Occupation: Actor
- Years active: 1985–present

Samuel Labarthe (born 16 May 1962) is a French-Swiss actor. He appeared in more than fifty films since 1985.

== Theater ==
Year	Title	Author	Director
1987	Esther	Jean Racine	Françoise Seigner
1988–89	Le Cid	Pierre Corneille	Gérard Desarthe
1990	How You Love Me	Luigi Pirandello	Maurice Attias
1993–94	Ce qui arrive et ce qu’on attend	Jean-Marie Besset	Patrice Kerbrat
1996	The Importance of Being Earnest	Oscar Wilde	Jérôme Savary
1996–97	Un cœur français	Jean-Marie Besset	Patrice Kerbrat
1997–98	Uncle Vanya	Anton Chekhov	Patrice Kerbrat
1999	Partage de midi	Paul Claudel	Gérard Desarthe
2001	Cat on a Hot Tin Roof	Tennessee Williams	Patrice Kerbrat
2001–03	The Shop Around the Corner	Miklós László	Jean-Jacques Zilbermann
2004	Rue de Babylone	Jean-Marie Besset	Jacques Lassalle
2005	Silk	Alessandro Baricco	Christophe Lidon
2006–08	The Caretaker	Harold Pinter	Didier Long
2009–10	My Old Lady	Israel Horovitz	Ladislas Chollat
2010	Le Rattachement	Didier Van Cauwelaert	Daniel Benoin
2012	Secret Thoughts	David Lodge	Christophe Lidon
2012	La Critique de l’École des femmes	Molière	Clément Hervieu-Léger
2013	Phèdre	Jean Racine	Michael Marmarinos
2014	The Visit	Friedrich Dürrenmatt	Christophe Lidon
2015	Summerfolk	Maxim Gorky	Gérard Desarthe
2016	Tartuffe	Molière	Luc Bondy
2019	Des nouvelles de Maupassant	Guy de Maupassant	Marie-Louise Bischofberger
2023–24	L'Usage du monde	Nicolas Bouvier	Catherine Schaub

== Filmography ==
Film
Year	Title	Role	Director	Notes
1988	Mangeclous	Solal	Moshé Mizrahi	
1990	Lacenaire	The abbot of Lusignan	Francis Girod	
1992	Le zèbre	Nogaret	Jean Poiret	
1992	The Accompanist	Jacques Fabert	Claude Miller	
1994	Priez pour nous	Raoul Guidon de Repeygnac	Jean-Pierre Vergne	
1994	Aux petits bonheurs		Michel Deville	
1999	Season's Beatings	Pierre	Danièle Thompson	
1999	Le plus beau pays du monde	Rüdiger	Marcel Bluwal	
2001	J'ai faim !!!	The physiotherapist	Florence Quentin	
2001	Charmant garçon	Hippolyte	Patrick Chesnais	
2002	Rue des plaisirs	The silent man	Patrice Leconte	
2002	Comme un avion	Simon	Marie-France Pisier	
2002	And Now... Ladies and Gentlemen	Trumpet Player	Claude Lelouch	
2003	Strayed	Robert	André Téchiné	
2003	Le Divorce	Antoine de Persand	James Ivory	
2005	Trois couples en quête d'orages	Olivier	Jacques Otmezguine	
2006	L'école pour tous	The principal	Éric Rochant	
2008	Sagan	René Julliard	Diane Kurys	
2008	Love Me No More	Étienne	Jean Becker	
2010	What War May Bring	Horst	Claude Lelouch	
2011	The Conquest	Dominique de Villepin	Xavier Durringer	
2012	Ma bonne étoile	Bernard Lacassagne	Anne Fassio	
2012	Bye Bye maman	The cosmetic surgeon	Keren Marciano	Short
2016	Moka	Simon	Frédéric Mermoud	
2022	Notre-Dame on Fire	Général Gontier	Jean-Jacques Annaud	

Television
Year	Title	Role	Director	Notes
1987	Les enquêtes Caméléon	Gill	Philippe Monnier	TV series (1 episode)
1989	Liberté, Libertés	The Marquis	Jean-Dominique de La Rochefoucauld	TV movie
1992	Taxi Girl	Michel	Jean-Dominique de La Rochefoucauld	TV movie
1993	Prat et Harris	Harris	Boramy Tioulong	TV movie
1994	La corruptrice	Doctor Fortier	Bernard Stora	TV movie
1994	Le jardin des plantes	Armand	Philippe de Broca	TV movie
1994	L'amour est un jeu d'enfant	Cyril Fournet	Pierre Grimblat	TV movie
1995	Machinations	François Stadler	Gérard Vergez	TV movie
1995	L'allée du Roi	Louis de Mornay	Nina Companeez	TV movie
1995	Un si joli bouquet	Luc	Jean-Claude Sussfeld	TV movie
1995	L'homme aux semelles de vent	Lucereau	Marc Rivière	TV movie
1996	La comète	Frédéric	Claude Santelli	TV movie
1996	L'allée du roi	Villarceaux	Nina Companeez	TV movie
1996	Flairs ennemis	Mathias	Robin Davis	TV movie
1996	Le crabe sur la banquette arrière	The editor	Jean-Pierre Vergne	TV movie
1997	Le grand Batre	Arnaut	Laurent Carcélès	TV movie
1997	Le diable en sabots	Le Faucheux	Nicole Berckmans	TV movie
1997	Le président et la garde-barrière	Baron Hupert	Jean-Dominique de La Rochefoucauld	TV movie
1999	Le voyou et le magistrat		Marc Rivière	TV movie
2000	Vertiges	Christian	Laurent Carcélès	TV series (1 episode)
2000	Josephine, Guardian Angel	Germain Dieuleveut	Laurence Katrian	TV series (1 episode)
2001	Un pique-nique chez Osiris	Ariel Cohen	Nina Companeez	TV movie
2001	Love in a Cold Climate	Fabrice	Tom Hooper	TV mini-series
2001	Carnets d'ado	Antoine	Laurence Katrian	TV series (1 episode)
2004	La bonté d'Alice	Paul Crocetti	Daniel Janneau	TV movie
2005	Boulevard du Palais	Jérôme Mondillet	Dominique Tabuteau	TV series (1 episode)
2005	Le juge est une femme	Stéphane Villemonde	Christian Bonnet	TV series (1 episode)
2006	Premier suspect	Frédéric Montvallon	Christian Bonnet	TV movie
2006	Henry Dunant: Du rouge sur la croix	Daniel Dunant	Dominique Othenin-Girard	TV movie
2006	Les Bleus	Pierre Valenski	Alain Tasma	TV series (1 episode)
2007	Sécurité intérieure	President Savin	Patrick & Emilie Grandperret	TV mini-series
2008	Marie-Octobre	Robert Cabris	Josée Dayan	TV movie
2008	À droite toute	Lequesne	Marcel Bluwal	TV mini-series
2008	Le sanglot des anges	Adrien	Jacques Otmezguine	TV mini-series
2008	R.I.S, police scientifique		Jean-Marc Seban	TV series (1 episode)
2009	L'école du pouvoir		Raoul Peck	TV movie
2009-19	Les Petits Meurtres d'Agatha Christie	Swan Laurence	Eric Woreth, Marc Angelo, ...	TV series (27 episodes)
2010	Le pain du diable	Doctor Sirelli	Bertrand Arthuys	TV movie
2010	En cas de malheur	Sam	Jean-Daniel Verhaeghe	TV movie
2010	Le grand restaurant	Monsieur Chalabert	Gérard Pullicino	TV movie
2011	L'âme du mal	Marco Deseo	Jérôme Foulon	TV movie
2011	Les belles soeurs	David	Gabriel Aghion	TV movie
2011	Mort d'un président	Jacques Chirac	Pierre Aknine	TV movie
2011	Saïgon, l'été de nos 20 ans	Edouard de Beauséjour	Philippe Venault	TV movie
2011	Les Dames	The prefect	Philippe Venault	TV series (1 episode)
2012	Un autre monde	Gabriel	Gabriel Aghion	TV movie
2012	Paradis criminel	Gary Lemercier	Serge Meynard	TV movie
2012	Médecin-chef à la Santé	Richard Vincent	Yves Rénier	TV movie
2012	Petits arrangements avec ma mère	Fabien	Denis Malleval	TV movie
2015	À demain sans faute	Thibaut	Jean-Louis Lorenzi	TV movie
2015	Crime à Aigues-Mortes	Charles de Fontbrune	Claude-Michel Rome	TV movie
2017	The Forest	Gaspard Decker	Julius Berg	TV mini-series
2018	Crimes Parfaits	Philippe Sevran	Christophe Douchand	TV series (1 episode)
2018	The law of Marion	Olivier Queyras	Stéphane Kappes	TV series (1 episode)
2019	L'art du crime	André Jaumard	Elsa Bennett & Hippolyte Dard	TV series (1 episode)
2020	De Gaulle, l'éclat et le secret	Charles de Gaulle	François Velle	TV mini-series
2020-23	César Wagner	Christian Hass	Antoine Garceau & Gabriel Julien-Laferrière	TV series (2 episodes)
2021	Service Volé	Franck Maraval	Jérôme Foulon	TV movie
2021	Meurtres dans les Trois Vallées	Alexandre	Emmanuel Rigaut	TV movie
2022	Poulets grillés	Weber	Pascal Lahmani	TV movie
2022	Diane de Poitiers	Francis I of France	Josée Dayan	TV movie
2023	L'Abîme	Bernard Duvack	François Velle	TV mini-series
2023	Class Act	François Mitterrand	Tristan Séguéla	TV mini-series
2023-24	Flair de famille	François Flament	Didier Bivel	TV series (2 episodes)

== Awards and nominations ==
Year	Award	Nominated work	Result
1994	Molière Award for Best Newcomer	Ce qui arrive et ce qu’on attend	Nominated
1998	Molière Award for Best Supporting Actor	Uncle Vanya	Nominated
2002	Molière Award for Best Actor	The Shop Around the Corner	Nominated
2007	Molière Award for Best Supporting Actor	The Caretaker	Nominated
2009	Molière Award for Best Actor	My Old Lady	Nominated
