= 38th César Awards =

Award ceremony

- Official poster featuring a 1952 photo of the late French actress Simone Signoret
- Date: 22 February 2013
- Site: Théâtre du Châtelet, Paris, France
- Hosted by: Antoine de Caunes

Highlights
- Best Film: Amour
- Best Director: Michael Haneke, Amour
- Best Actor: Jean-Louis Trintignant, Amour
- Best Actress: Emmanuelle Riva, Amour
- Most awards: Amour (5)
- Most nominations: Camille Redouble (13)

Television coverage
- Network: Canal+

The 38th Annual César Awards ceremony, presented by the French Academy of Cinema Arts and Techniques (Académie des Arts et Techniques du Cinéma), was held on 22 February 2013, at the Théâtre du Châtelet in Paris. The ceremony was chaired by Jamel Debbouze, with Antoine de Caunes as master of ceremonies. Nominations were announced 25 January 2013. Michael Haneke's film Amour, nominated in ten categories, won in five, including Best Film, Best Director, Best Actor and Best Actress.

== Winners and nominees ==
Winners are listed first and highlighted in bold.

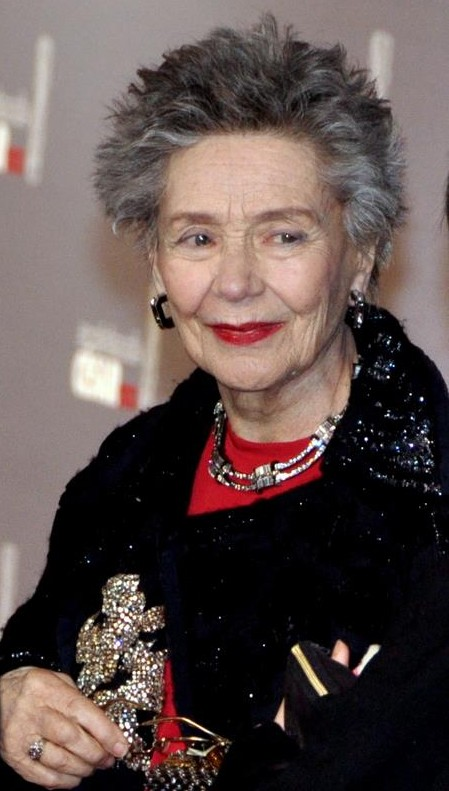
Emmanuelle Riva, César Award for Best Actress.

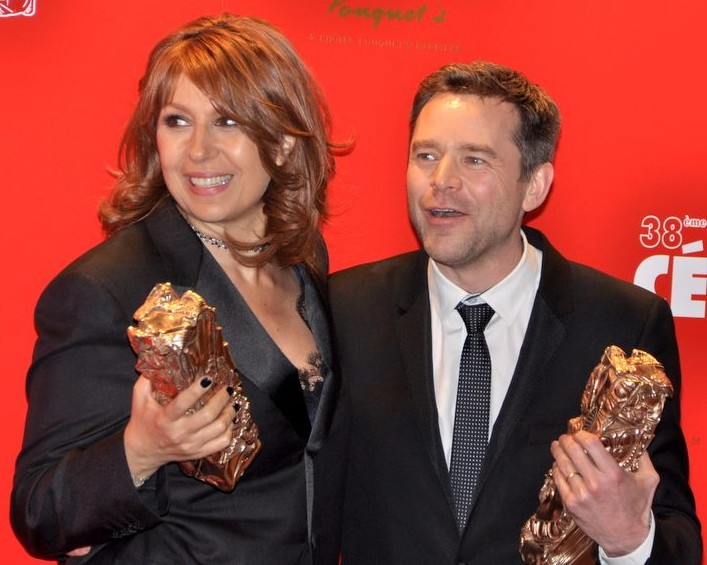
Valérie Benguigui (left) and Guillaume de Tonquédec, César Award for Best Supporting Actress and Actor.

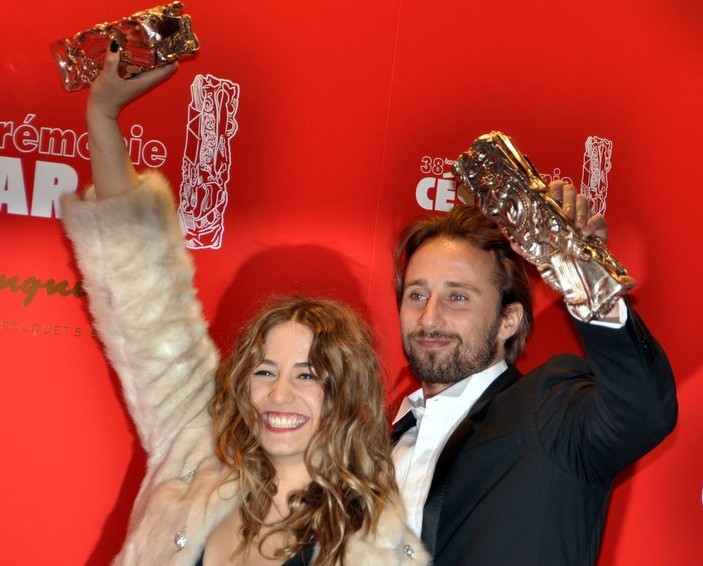
Izïa Higelin (left) and Matthias Schoenaerts, César Award for Most Promising Actress and Actor.

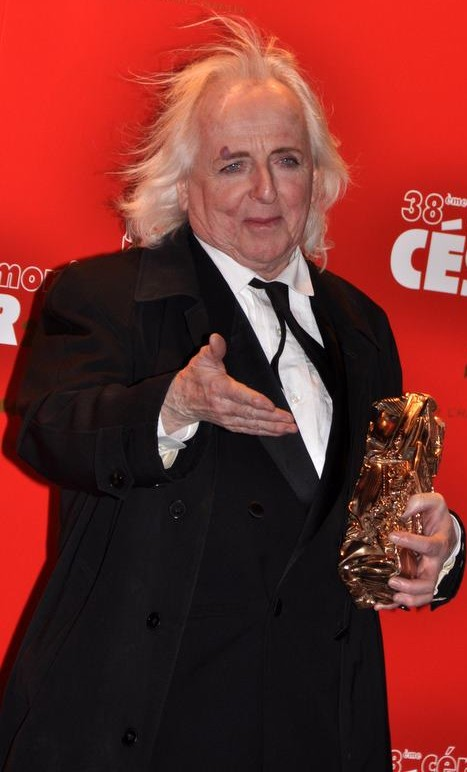
Christian Gasc, César Award for Best Costume Design.

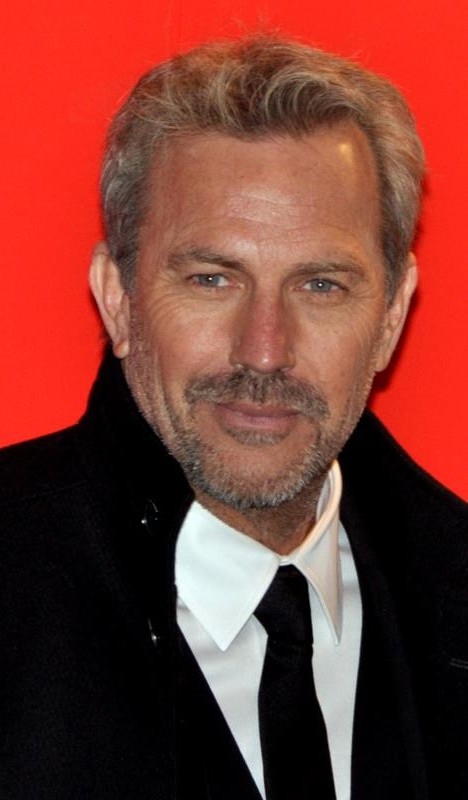
Kevin Costner, Honorary César.

| Best Film | Best Director |
|---|---|
| **Amour**: Camille Redouble; Farewell, My Queen; Holy Motors; In the House; Rust and Bone; What's in a Name? | **Michael Haneke, Amour**: Jacques Audiard, Rust and Bone; Stéphane Brizé, A Few Hours of Spring; Leos Carax, Holy Motors; Benoît Jacquot, Farewell, My Queen; Noémie Lvovsky, Camille Redouble; François Ozon, In the House |
| Best Actor | Best Actress |
| **Jean-Louis Trintignant, Amour**: Jean-Pierre Bacri, Looking for Hortense; Patrick Bruel, What's in a Name?; Denis Lavant, Holy Motors; Vincent Lindon, A Few Hours of Spring; Fabrice Luchini, In the House; Jérémie Rénier, My Way | **Emmanuelle Riva, Amour**: Marion Cotillard, Rust and Bone; Catherine Frot, Haute Cuisine; Noémie Lvovsky, Camille Redouble; Corinne Masiero, Louise Wimmer; Léa Seydoux, Farewell, My Queen; Hélène Vincent, A Few Hours of Spring |
| Best Supporting Actor | Best Supporting Actress |
| **Guillaume de Tonquédec, What's in a Name?**: Samir Guesmi, Camille Redouble; Benoît Magimel, My Way; Claude Rich, Looking for Hortense; Michel Vuillermoz, Camille Redouble | **Valérie Benguigui, What's in a Name?**: Judith Chemla, Camille Redouble; Isabelle Huppert, Amour; Yolande Moreau, Camille Redouble; Édith Scob, Holy Motors |
| Most Promising Actor | Most Promising Actress |
| **Matthias Schoenaerts**, Rust and Bone: Felix Moati, Télé gaucho; Kacey Mottet Klein, Sister; Pierre Niney, Comme des frères; Ernst Umhauer, In the House | **Izïa Higelin**, Bad Girl: Alice de Lencquesaing, Au galop; Lola Dewaere, Mince alors!; Julia Faure, Camille Redouble; India Hair, Camille Redouble |
| Best First Feature Film | Best Original Screenplay |
| **Louise Wimmer**: Augustine; Comme des frères; Populaire; Hold Back | **Michael Haneke, Amour**: Benoît Jacquot, Farewell, My Queen; Noémie Lvovsky, Camille Redouble; François Ozon, In the House; Jacques Audiard, Rust and Bone; Leos Carax, Holy Motors; Stéphane Brizé, A Few Hours of Spring |
| Best Cinematography | Best Adaptation |
| **Romain Winding**, Farewell, My Queen: Darius Khondji, Amour; Stéphane Fontaine, Rust and Bone; Caroline Champetier, Holy Motors; Guillaume Schiffman, Populaire | **Jacques Audiard & Thomas Bidegain, Rust and Bone**: Lucas Belvaux, One Night; Gilles Taurand & Benoît Jacquot, Farewell, My Queen; François Ozon, In the House; Matthieu Delaporte & Alexandre de la Patellière, What's in a Name? |
| Best Editing | Best Sound |
| **Rust and Bone, Juliette Welfling**: Farewell, My Queen, Luc Barnier; Amour, Monika Willi; Camille Redouble, Annette Dutertre & Michel Klochendler; Holy Motors, Nelly Quettier | **My Way, Antoine Deflandre, Germain Boulay & Eric Tisserand**: Farewell, My Queen, Brigitte Taillandier, Francis Wargnier & Olivier Goinard; Amour, Guillaume Sciama, Nadine Muse & Jean-Pierre Laforce; Rust and Bone, Brigitte Taillandier, Pascal Villard & Jean-Paul Hurier; Holy Motors, Erwan Kerzanet, Josefina Rodriguez & Emmanuel Croset |
| Best Music Written for a Film | Best Costume Design |
| **Rust and Bone, Alexandre Desplat**: Farewell, My Queen, Bruno Coulais; Camille Redouble, Gaëtan Roussel & Joseph Dahan; In the House, Philippe Rombi; Populaire, Rob & Emmanuel d'Orlando | **Farewell, My Queen, Christian Gasc**: Augustine, Pascaline Chavanne; Camille Redouble, Madeline Fontaine; My Way, Mimi Lempicka; Populaire, Charlotte David |
| Best Production Design | Best Documentary |
| **Farewell, My Queen, Katia Wyszkop**: Amour, Jean-Vincent Puzos; My Way, Philippe Chiffre; Holy Motors, Florian Sanson; Populaire, Sylvie Olivé | **Les invisibles**: Bovines ou la vraie vie des vaches; Duch, le maître des forges de l'Enfer; Journal de France; Les nouveaux chiens de garde |
| Best Animated Film | Best Short Film |
| **Ernest & Celestine**: Edmond Was a Donkey (Edmond était un âne); Kirikou and the Men and Women; Oh Willy...; Zarafa | **The Lobster's Cry (Le cri du homard)**: It's Not a Cowboy Movie (Ce n'est pas un film de cow-boys); What We'll Leave Behind (Ce qu'il restera de nous); The Hounds (Les meutes); La vie parisienne |
Best Foreign Film
**Argo (USA), Ben Affleck**: Our Children (Belgium, France), Joachim Lafosse; Bullhead (Belgium), Michaël R. Roskam; Laurence Anyways (Canada), Xavier Dolan; Oslo, August 31st (Norway), Joachim Trier; The Angels' Share (Scotland, Belgium, Italy), Ken Loach; A Royal Affair (Denmark, Sweden, Czech Republic), Nikolaj Arcel

== Honorary César ==
Kevin Costner, American actor, director and producer

== Viewers ==
The show was followed by 2.5 million viewers. This corresponds to 12.5% of the audience.

== See also ==
- 85th Academy Awards
- 66th British Academy Film Awards
- 25th European Film Awards
- 18th Lumière Awards
- 3rd Magritte Awards
- 58th David di Donatello
- 28th Goya Awards
