= Théâtre du Soleil =

French theatre company created in 1964 by Ariane Mnouchkine

Logo

Le Théâtre du Soleil (French: [lə teɑtʁ dy sɔlɛj], lit. "The Theater of the Sun") is a Parisian avant-garde stage ensemble founded by Ariane Mnouchkine, Philippe Léotard and fellow students of the L'École Internationale de Théâtre Jacques Lecoq in 1964 as a collective of theatre artists. Le Théâtre du Soleil is located at La Cartoucherie, a former munitions factory in the Vincennes area of eastern Paris. The company uses physical theatre and improvisation.

== Sociohistorical context ==
The Theatre du Soleil was founded as a theatre collective in 1964, in the midst of the Cold War. In 1965, Charles de Gaulle was re-elected President of France in the first election with a direct popular vote for the office. In 1968, a labor strike in France involved 11 million workers, students, and far-left politicians. Mnouchkine, a theatre student, started Le Theatre du Soleil with her peers who were interested in creating original theatre during this period.

== Timeline ==
1964: Le Theatre du Soleil is established

1964–65: Les Petits Bourgeois presented at Théâtre Mouffetard

1965–66: Capitaine Fracasse presented at the Theater Récamier

1967: La Cuisine presented at Cirque de Montmartre

1968: Le Songe d'une Nuit d'Ete (A Midsummer's Night's Dream) L'Arbre Sorcier, Jerome et la Tortue

1969–70: Les Clowns presented at Festival d'Avignon, Piccolo Teatro de Milan

1970–1971: Le Theatre du Soleil moves to their permanent base, la Cartoucherie, a former munitions factory on the outskirts of Paris

1789 opens in La Cartoucherie.

1974: Film version of 1789 released

1975: L'Age d'Or

1976–77: Don Juan

1978 Molière, film directed by Ariane Mnouchkine and starring Philippe Caubère, presents the biography of Moliere. It was in competition for the Palme d'Or at Cannes in 1978.

1979–80: Mephisto, Le Roman d'une Carriere

1981–84: Translated works of Shakespeare are presented in cycles, including Richard II and Henry IV Parts 1 and 2

1985–86: L'Histoire Terrible Mais Inachevee de Norodom Sihanouk, Roi du Cambodge

1987–88: L'Indiade ou L'Inde de leurs Reves

1989: Film version of La Nuit Miraculeuse

1990–93: Cycle Les Atrides (including Ipighenie a Aulis, Agamemnon, Les Choephores, and Les Eumenides)

1993: L'Inde, de Pere en Fils, de Mere en Fille

1994: La Ville perjure ou le Reveil des Erinyes

1996–97: Film Au Soleil Meme la Nuit

1997–98: Et Soudain des Nuits d'Eveil Tout est Bien qui Finit Bien

1999–2002: La Ville Parjure ou le Reveil des Erinyes Tambours sur la Digue

2003–2006: Le Dernier Caravanserail (Odyssees) Le Fleuve Cruel Origines et Destins

2007–2009: Les Ephemeres

2008: Film L'Aventure du Theatre du Soleil

2010–2011: Les Naufrages du Fol Espoir (reached 200th performance in February 2011)

2014–2015: Macbeth

2016–2019: Une Chambre en Inde (A Room in India, performed in New York City in December 2017, at the Park Avenue Armory)

2018: Kanata (directed by Robert Lepage, with the troupe of Théâtre du Soleil)

Somewhere, point unknown along the timeline, a maskmaking master I Setiawan Nyoman created masks for the theatre.

== Mission and philosophy ==
Founded by Ariane Mnouchkine, The Theatre du Soleil was founded in the 1960s as a reaction against traditional theatrical institutions in France. Although they have never presented a formalized mission statement, they have been characterized by a commitment to the merging of a wide variety of art forms, both Western and non-Western, and a fair wage. Company members describe working for the Theatre du Soleil as "a style of life", while a reviewer for The New York Times said of their production Les Ephemeres: "The aim here is not to shape life into taut dramatic form but to present lived experience intimately and without evidence of artists' interpretation and manipulation." Mnouchkine summarized the philosophy of the organization as "Theatre du Soleil is the dream of living, working, being happy and searching for beauty and for goodness….It's trying to live for higher purposes, not for richness. It's very simple, really."

The company's productions have included both re-imaginings of classics of Western theatre such as Shakespeare's Richard II and Moliere's Tartuffe, but the company is known for their original works. The collective, consisting of 70 members as of July 2009, takes the concept and direction for their original productions from founder Ariane Mnouchkine. Their six-hour-long 2005 production Le Dernier Caravansérail (Odyssées) was based on a compilation of letters and interviews collected by Mnouchkine and her colleagues from refugee camps from around the world, while Les Ephemeres in 2009 was based on nine months of improvisations stemming from Mnouchkine's question: What would you do if you found out that all of humanity would die out within three months?

At other times, they provocatively, directly comment on contemporary events, such as their production of Tartuffe in which the title character was presented as an Islamic zealot at a time when there was a movement in France against foreign immigration. They have used bunraku-style puppetry in their production Tambours sur la Digue. The company's emphasis on movement and physical theatre is in part due to Mnouchkine's study under Jacques Lecoq. Their performances also frequently feature direct contact between the actors and the audience members. All employees are paid the exact same wage, and must sometimes go without a salary for months when the company is not performing and earning income. All performers do technical work on productions, such as maintaining moving set pieces for Les Ephemeres.

== Major works ==
The Theatre du Soleil's premiere performance was in 1964–65 with Les Petits Bourgeois. The company's first widely recognized production was in 1967 with Arnold Wesker's 1957 play The Kitchen. They continued on to form a theatre collective and produce their first major success, 1789, a show about the French Revolution. Their performance suggested "the Revolution was subverted by those more concerned about property than justice". Another of the company's most famous works was Les Atrides. This was made up of Euripides' Iphigenia at Aulis and Aeschylus' The Oresteia. The production took over two years to mount, played in numerous countries including the United States and Germany, and integrated several forms of Asian dance and drama. In 2005, Le Theatre du Soleil presented Le Dernier Caravanserail (Odyssees) or The Last Caravansary (Odysseys).

One of the company's most recent major works was their production of Les Ephemeres created and directed by Ariane Mnouchkine. The show premiered at the 2009 Lincoln Center Festival. Les Ephemeres is centered on the river of time with its events, both past and present. The Village Voice characterized the show's theme as "To go with the flow, to accept the fact that time is the great devastator. " Tout passe, tout casse, tout basse, says a French proverb: Everything passes, everything breaks, everything sinks." The performance is split into two three-and-a-half-hour-long sections, with the full run time just over seven hours long.

== Major players ==
A number of her fellow students were also her collaborators in the initial founding of the company, including:

- Georges Donzenac—physical training, physical education teacher
- Myrrha Donzenac—actress
- Gerard Hardy—actor
- Philippe Leotard—actor
- Roberto Moscoso—designer
- Jean-Claude Penchenat—actor, director
- Jean-Pierre Tailhade—actor
- Francoise Tournafond—costume designer

Mnouchkine refused to be interviewed alone for a New York Times article, although individuals such as Hélène Cixous (playwright) and Jean-Jacques Lemetre (composer and musician) repeatedly fulfill specific production roles and have done so for many years.

== Europe Theatre Prize ==
In 1987, the first artist to be awarded by the international jury of the Europe Theatre Prize chaired by Irene Papas was Ariane Mnouchkine for her work with the Théâtre du Soleil.

Reason for Award:

The Jury, unanimously decided to award the 1987 Europe Theatre Prize to the Théâtre du Soleil directed by Ariane Mnouchkine, for having directed and realized on solid foundations an effective contribution to the renewal of theatre language and to the proposal for a new approach to the profession of the actor. The Prize consists in a sum of 60,000 ECU and in an original sculpture of Pietro Consagra.

== See also ==
- Ariane Mnouchkine
- Bunraku
- Hélène Cixous
- Jacques Lecoq
- Moliere
- Philippe Leotard
- Physical theatre
- Jean-Jacques Lemêtre
