= Philippe Caubère =

French actor and playwright

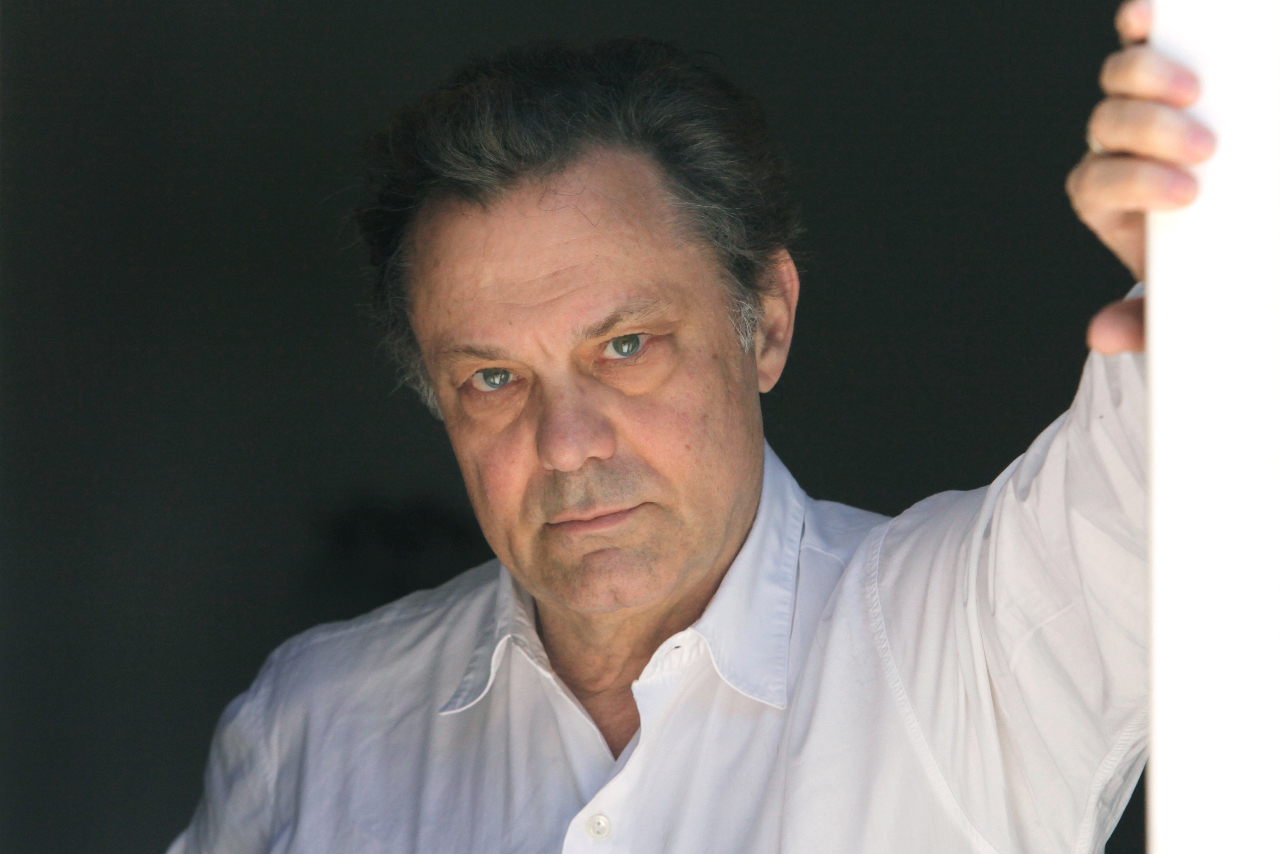
Caubère in 2011

Philippe Caubère (born September 21, 1950, in Marseille, France) is a noted French actor, writer and producer.

Caubère is particularly well-known for his autobiographical one-man-shows, for which he has won three Molière awards, and for his memorable performances as Molière in the 1978 French movie.

Since 2018, Philippe Caubère has been facing several accusations of sexual abuse.

== Biography ==
Philippe Caubère is a key member of the Théâtre du Soleil troupe from 1970 to 1977. In the 1980s, he began a serie of autobiographical shows centered on the life of his alter-ego, Ferdinand Faure. For Ariane ou l'Âge d'or, one of the episodes of this cycle, he won two Molière awards in 1987 (Molière du théâtre privé and Molière de la révélation masculine).. In 2017, he received a Molière Award for Best Actor, and the Grand prix du théâtre (Grand Prize for lifetime achievement in theatre) from the Académie française.

== Sexual misconduct allegations ==
In 2018, Philippe Caubère was the subject of a rape complaint. The case was dismissed, and ultimately, it was the complainant who was convicted of defamation.

In 2024, he was placed under formal investigation for sexual assault, rape, and the corruption of minors. In 2025, in connection with this case, his lawyer was placed under formal investigation for "withholding evidence" : she is suspected of making Caubère's computer disappear—a computer that reportedly contained incriminating material. That same year, Caubère was placed under formal investigation for procuring : he allegedly forced his victim to engage in paid sexual acts with hundreds of men.

== Selected filmography ==
Year	Title	Role	Notes
1978	Molière		
1980	The Woman Cop		
1990	My Mother's Castle		
1990	My Father's Glory		
2006	L'étoile du soldat		
2007	Paris Lockdown		
