= Molière (1978 film) =

- Directed by: Ariane Mnouchkine
- Written by: Ariane Mnouchkine
- Produced by: Claude Lelouch
- Starring: Philippe Caubère
- Cinematography: Bernard Zitzermann
- Edited by: Françoise Javet; Georges Klotz
- Music by: René Clemencic
- Distributed by: Les Artistes Associés
- Release date: 30 August 1978
- Running time: 260 minutes
- Country: France
- Language: French
- Box office: $11.6 million

Molière is a 1978 French drama film directed by Ariane Mnouchkine. It was entered into the 1978 Cannes Film Festival.

== Plot ==
Jean-Baptiste Poquelin is raised by his father and his grandfather because his mother dies when he's still very little. He works as a handyman, studies the law at a university and travels the country as an actor before he becomes the celebrated playwright Molière who impresses firstly the Duke of Orleans and then even King Louis XIV.

== Cast ==
- Philippe Caubère as Molière / The Death
- Frédéric Ladonne as Molière, child
- Jonathan Sutton as La Grange
- Julien Maurel as The friend of Molière
- Philippe Cointepas as The comrades Molière
- Maurice Chevit as The priest of the school
- Odile Cointepas as The mother
- Armand Delcampe as The father
- Jean Dasté as The grandfather
- Joséphine Derenne as Madeleine Béjart
- Brigitte Catillon as Armande Béjart
- Mario Gonzáles as Scaramouche
- Albert Delpy as Nicolas Boileau
- Guy-Claude François as The bird-man
- Michel Hart as Les dévots
- Alfred Simon as Les dévots
- Marie-Françoise Audollent
- Jean Brard
