= Paris Lockdown =

- Theatrical release poster
- Directed by: Frédéric Schoendoerffer
- Written by: Frédéric Schoendoerffer; Yann Brion
- Produced by: Éric Névé
- Starring: Benoît Magimel; Philippe Caubère
- Cinematography: Jean-Pierre Sauvaire
- Edited by: Irène Blecua
- Music by: Bruno Coulais
- Distributed by: Mars Distribution
- Release date: 17 January 2007
- Running time: 107 minutes
- Country: France
- Language: French
- Budget: $4.6 million
- Box office: $4.7 million

Paris Lockdown (French: Truands) is a 2007 French crime film directed by Frédéric Schoendoerffer.

== Cast ==
- Benoît Magimel - Franck
- Philippe Caubère - Corti
- Béatrice Dalle - Béatrice
- Olivier Marchal - Jean-Guy
- Mehdi Nebbou - Hicham
- Tomer Sisley - Larbi
- Ludovic Schoendoerffer - Ricky
- Anne Marivin - Laure
