= Jean-Michel Dupuis =

French actor (1955–2024)

- Born: 2 February 1955; Gournay-en-Bray, France
- Died: 14 September 2024 (aged 69)
- Occupation: Actor
- Years active: 1976–2015

Jean-Michel Dupuis (2 February 1955 – 14 September 2024) was a French theatre, television, and film actor. Born on 2 February 1955, he died on 14 September 2024, at the age of 69.

== Filmography ==
Year	Title	Role	Director	Notes
1976	Little Marcel	Denis	Jacques Fansten	
1978	Dossier 51	Agent Hécate	Michel Deville	
1978	Les deux berges	Tobie	Patrick Antoine	TV movie
1978	Douze heures pour mourir	Tobie	Abder Isker	TV movie
1978	Brigade des mineurs	Jacques Castagnier	Jean Chapot	TV series (1 episode)
1979	La petite Fadette	Sylvain	Lazare Iglesis	TV movie
1979	Par devant notaire	Henri Lendrac	Joseph Drimal	TV movie
1980	La Boum	Étienne	Claude Pinoteau	
1980	L'oeil du maître	Bernard	Stéphane Kurc	
1980	T'inquiète pas, ça se soigne	Jean Marin	Eddy Matalon	
1980	Le noeud de vipères		Jacques Trébouta	TV movie
1980	Les maîtres sonneurs	Joset	Lazare Iglesis	TV movie
1981	Eaux profondes	Philip Cowan	Michel Deville	
1981	L'arme au bleu	Le Loher	Maurice Frydland	TV movie
1981	Noires sont les galaxies	The student	Daniel Moosmann	TV movie
1981	Cinéma 16	Clément Bernejoul	Charles L. Bitsch	TV series (1 episode)
1981	Julien Fontanes, magistrat	Jacky Balkowiacz	François Dupont-Midi	TV series (1 episode)
1982	L'autre maison	Roger	Daniel Georgeot	TV movie
1982	Bonbons en gros	Jean-Pierre	François Dupont-Midi	TV movie
1983	Life Is a Bed of Roses	Laplaud	Alain Resnais	
1983	The Death of Mario Ricci	Didier Meylan	Claude Goretta	
1985	Palace	The waiter	Édouard Molinaro	
1985	Blanche et Marie	The priest	Jacques Renard	
1985	L'amour en douce	Jacques	Édouard Molinaro	
1986	Nuit d'ivresse	Steve	Bernard Nauer	
1986	Attention bandits!		Claude Lelouch	
1986	L'ami Maupassant	Lesable	Alain Dhénaut	TV series (1 episode)
1986	Julien Fontanes, magistrat	Nono	Jean-Pierre Decourt	TV series (1 episode)
1988	Preuve d'amour	Xavier Lecoq	Miguel Courtois	
1988	La septième dimension	Louis	Benoît Ferreux	
1988	Door on the Left as You Leave the Elevator	Jean-Yves	Édouard Molinaro	
1988	Les rats de Montsouris	Steff	Maurice Frydland	TV movie
1989	Les grandes familles	François Schoudler	Édouard Molinaro	TV mini-series
1990	Eurocops		Joannick Desclers	TV series (1 episode)
1990	Sentiments	David	François Luciani	TV series (1 episode)
1991	Merci la vie	Lorry Driver	Bertrand Blier	
1991	La dernière tentation de Chris		Patrick Malakian	Short
1991	Billy	Martin	Marcel Bluwal	TV movie
1991	L'héritière	Vincent	Jean Sagols	TV movie
1991	L'irlandaise	Alain Moreau	José Giovanni	TV movie
1991	Un été alsacien	Joseph	Maurice Frydland	TV movie
1992	La Belle Histoire	The professor	Claude Lelouch	
1992	Mes coquins	Charles	Jean-Daniel Verhaeghe	TV movie
1992	La controverse de Valladolid	The Colon	Jean-Daniel Verhaeghe	TV movie
1993	Mauvais garçon	The robbed man	Jacques Bral	
1993	L'interdiction	Bianchon	Jean-Daniel Verhaeghe	TV movie
1993	Les noces de carton	Ben	Pierre Sisser	TV movie
1993	Meurtre avec préméditation	Georges Chevrier	Michel Favart	TV series (1 episode)
1994	Pourquoi maman est dans mon lit?	Georges	Patrick Malakian	
1995	La règle du silence	Duarte	Marc Rivière & Marie Rivière	TV movie
1995	Belle Époque		Gavin Millar	TV mini-series
1995	Associations de bienfaiteurs	Faria	Jean-Daniel Verhaeghe	TV mini-series
1997	Aventurier malgré lui	Moreau	Marc Rivière	TV movie
1998	Terminale	Mayard	Francis Girod	
1998	Une grosse bouchée d'amour	Alain	Michaëla Watteaux	TV movie
1999	Nora	Antoine	Édouard Molinaro	TV movie
1999	Du jour au lendemain		Bruno Herbulot	TV movie
2000	Deux frères	Jean-Paul	Philippe Laïk	TV movie
2000	L'amour sur un fil	The creator	Michaëla Watteaux	TV movie
2000	Vérité oblige	Baptiste Milan	Jacques Malaterre	TV series (1 episode)
2000	Une femme d'honneur	Christian Vincenti	David Delrieux	TV series (1 episode)
2000	Le juge est une femme	Vidal	Pierre Boutron	TV series (1 episode)
2000	Josephine, Guardian Angel	Martin	Nicolas Cuche	TV series (1 episode)
2001	La course en fête	Roger	Daniel Losset	TV movie
2001	Famille d'accueil	Daniel Ferrière	Alain Wermus	TV series (1 episode)
2001	Les Cordier, juge et flic	Thénard	Gilles Béhat	TV series (1 episode)
2002	Les fleurs de Maureen	Marc	Dominique Baron	TV movie
2002	Corto Maltese: La cour secrète des Arcanes	Von Ungern	Pascal Morelli	TV movie
2002	Malone	Doctor Belfour	Franck Apprederis	TV series (1 episode)
2002	Commissariat Bastille	Philippe Collin	Jean-Marc Seban	TV series (1 episode)
2004	Moments de vérité	Claude	Bruno Carrière	TV movie
2004	À cran, deux ans après	Guérini	Alain Tasma	TV movie
2005	Dossier Caroline Karsen		Bernard Rosselli	Short
2006	Un printemps à Paris	Anatole	Jacques Bral	
2006	Ange de feu	Marc Sorel	Philippe Setbon	TV movie
2006	Le Rainbow Warrior	Colonel Lançon	Pierre Boutron	TV movie
2006	Sauveur Giordano	Commissaire Vernier	Bertrand Van Effenterre	TV series (1 episode)
2006	Le juge est une femme	Policeman	Joyce Buñuel	TV series (1 episode)
2007	L'affaire Ben Barka	Commissaire Caille	Jean-Pierre Sinapi	TV movie
2008	Braquage en famille	Guimont-Villiers	Pierre Boutron	TV movie
2008	Le voyage de la veuve	Deibler	Philippe Laïk	TV movie
2008	Adresse inconnue	Noam	Rodolphe Tissot	TV series (1 episode)
2009	Des gens qui passent	Inspector Q.O	Alain Nahum	TV movie
2013	Studio illegale	Antoine De Montcorbier	Umberto Riccioni Carteni	
2013	Une bonne leçon	Daniel	Bruno Garcia	TV movie

== Theater ==
Year	Title	Author	Director	Notes
1976	King Lear	William Shakespeare	Daniel Benoin & Dominique Pichou	
1977–1978	Pericles, Prince of Tyre	William Shakespeare	Roger Planchon	
1978	La Manifestation	Philippe Madral	Jacques Rosner	
1978	Drums in the Night	Bertolt Brecht	Yvon Davis	
1978	Antony and Cleopatra	William Shakespeare	Roger Planchon	
1979	Platonov	Anton Chekhov	Gabriel Garran	
1980	Silence... on aime	Michel Lengliney	Maurice Risch	
1981	Jacques and his Master	Milan Kundera	Georges Werler	
1985	Comme de mal entendu	Peter Ustinov	Michel Bertay	
1986	Don Carlos	Friedrich Schiller	Michelle Marquais	
1987	Pendant que vous dormiez	Robert Pouderou	Dominique Bluzet	
1987	Conversations après un enterrement	Yasmina Reza	Patrice Kerbrat	Nominated - Molière Award for Best Supporting Actor
1988–1989	Retours	Pierre Laville	Patrice Kerbrat	
1989	Hermani	Victor Hugo	Jean-Luc Tardieu	
1991	Le Jardin d'agrément	Catherine Zambon	Simone Amouyal	
1991	Scenes from an Execution	Howard Barker	Simone Amouyal	
1996	Waiting for Godot	Samuel Beckett	Patrice Kerbrat	Nominated - Molière Award for Best Supporting Actor
1999	Les Portes du ciel	Jacques Attali	Stéphane Hillel	Nominated - Molière Award for Best Supporting Actor
2003	Dom Juan	Molière	Daniel Benoin	
2003	La Suspension du plongeur	Lionel Spycher	Lionel Spycher	
2004	Quand l'amour s'emmêle	Anne-Marie Etienne	Anne-Marie Etienne	
2006	La Danse de l'albatros	Gérald Sibleyras	Patrice Kerbrat	Nominated - Molière Award for Best Supporting Actor
2006	Conversations après un enterrement	Yasmina Reza	Gabriel Garran	
2007	Avec deux ailes	Danielle Mathieu-Bouillon	Anne Bourgeois	
2010	What's in a Name?	Matthieu Delaporte & Alexandre de la Patellière	Bernard Murat	Nominated - Molière Award for Best Supporting Actor
2014–2015	Le Mensonge	Florian Zeller	Bernard Murat	Nominated - Molière Award for Best Supporting Actor
