= Ariane Mnouchkine =

French stage director (born 1939)

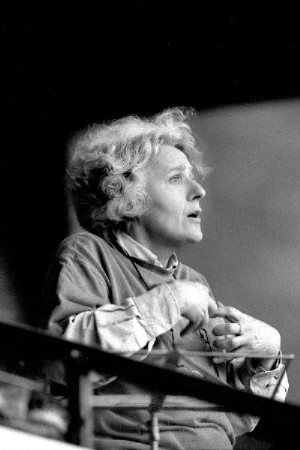
- Born: 3 March 1939 (age 87); Boulogne-sur-Seine, France
- Education: Sorbonne University
- Years active: 1964 – present
- Parents: Alexandre Mnouchkine (father); June Hannen (mother)

Ariane Mnouchkine (French: [aʁjan nuʃkin]; born 3 March 1939) is a French stage director. She co-founded the Parisian avant-garde stage ensemble Théâtre du Soleil in 1964. She wrote and directed 1789 (1974) and Molière (1978), and directed La Nuit Miraculeuse (1989). She holds a Chair of Artistic Creation at the Collège de France, an Honorary Degree in Performing Arts from the University of Rome III, awarded in 2005 and an Honorary Doctor of Letters from Oxford University, awarded 18 June 2008.

== Biography ==
Ariane Mnouchkine is the daughter of Jewish Russian film producer Alexandre Mnouchkine and June Hannen (daughter of Nicholas Hannen). Mnouchkine's paternal grandparents, Alexandre and Bronislawa Mnouchkine, were both deported from Drancy to Auschwitz on 17 December 1943, where they were both murdered. Ariane is the namesake of the production company Les Films Ariane that was founded by her father.

Mnouchkine attended Sorbonne University in Paris, France, where she studied literature. On a year abroad at Oxford University in England, studying English literature, she joined the Oxford University Dramatic Society, and decided to return to her roots in theatre. She founded the ATEP (Association Théâtrale des Étudiants de Paris or Parisian Students’ Theatrical Association) in 1959 when she returned to the Sorbonne. She continued theatre studies at L'École Internationale de Théâtre Jacques Lecoq, where in 1964 she founded Théâtre du Soleil (Theatre of the Sun) with her fellow students. The theatre collective still continues to create social and political critiques of local and world cultures. Théâtre du Soleil's productions are often performed in found spaces like barns or gymnasiums because Mnouchkine does not like being confined to a typical stage. Similarly, she feels theatre cannot be restricted with the "fourth wall". When audiences enter a Mnouchkine production, they will often find the actors preparing (putting on makeup, getting into costume) right before their eyes.

In 1971, Mnouchkine signed the Manifesto of the 343, publicly announcing she had an illegal abortion.

Mnouchkine has developed her own works, like the political-themed 1789, as well as numerous classical texts like Molière's Don Juan or Tartuffe. Between 1981 and 1984, she translated and directed a series of William Shakespeare plays: Richard II, Twelfth Night, and Henry IV, Part 1. While she developed the shows one at a time, when she finished Henry IV, she toured the three together as a cycle of plays. Similarly, she developed Iphigenia by Euripides and the Oresteia (Agamemnon, Choephori, and The Eumenides) by Aeschylus between 1990 and 1992. Mnouchkine also adapted a play from Klaus Mann's novel Mephisto. This was featured in the 1994 collection or Plays by Mediterranean Women

While mainly a stage director, she has been involved in some films. She shared an Oscar nomination for Best Screenplay for L'Homme de Rio (That Man from Rio, 1964). Her movie 1789 (filmed from the live production), which dealt with the French Revolution, brought her international fame in 1974. In 1978, she wrote and directed Molière, a biography of the famous French playwright, which earned her a Palme d'Or nomination at Cannes. She collaborated with Hélène Cixous on a number of projects including La Nuit miraculeuse and Tambours sur la digue, two made-for-television movies in 1989 and 2003 respectively. In 1987, she was the first recipient of the Europe Theatre Prize for her work with the Théâtre du Soleil.

In 1992, Mnouchkine criticized the EuroDisney as cultural Chernobyl and was very much against about the decision to open the European branch of the theme park in Paris.

In 2009, Mnouchkine won the Ibsen Award. The prize was awarded to her at a ceremony at the National Theatre in Oslo on 10 September 2009. Mnouchkine received the Goethe Medal in 2011.

In 2019, Mnouchkine was awarded the Kyoto Prize for Arts and Philosophy (Theater, Cinema).
