= The Visitor (play) =

1993 play by Eric-Emmanuel Schmitt

The Visitor (Play)
- Author: Eric-Emmanuel Schmitt
- Language: French
- Genre: Theater
- Published: 1993
- Publication place: France

The Visitor is a 1993 play written by French-Belgian author Eric-Emmanuel Schmitt, first published in France. It consists of seventeen acts of varying length. The play is set in Vienna in 1938, when the Nazis were beginning to take control of the city (in the Anschluss). It explores the inner conflicts within Sigmund Freud as this occurs.

== Themes ==
Eric Emmanuel Schmitt is known for writing literature that is primarily philosophical. As he himself noted in a French magazine, philosophy and Greek tragedy were invented simultaneously, and tragedy is, in a way, a version of philosophy that is accessible to the public. As a writer, he says his goal is to present and explore philosophical ideas that are simple enough for everyone to understand, and this can easily be seen in The Visitor, as well as in other works by the author.

Main themes in this play are the human condition and defects, the belief (or disbelief) in God, the results of war, and Nazism.

== Characters ==
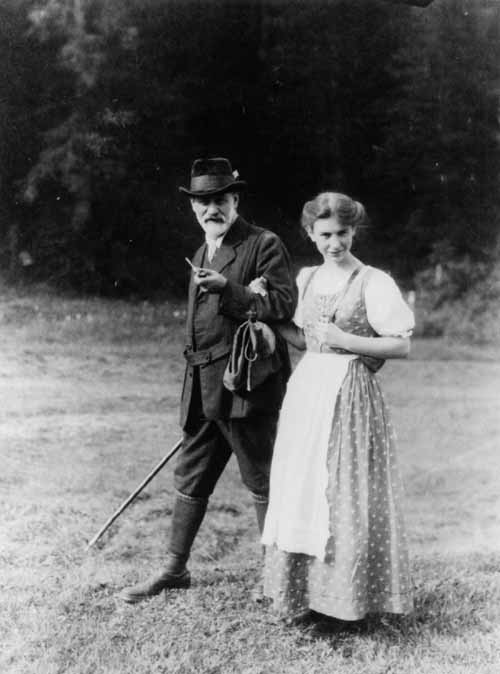
Anna and Freud are granted life again in the play.

=== Sigmund Freud ===
Schmitt portrays Sigmund Freud, the Twentieth century psychoanalyst, living in Vienna before World War I. In the play Freud seems very troubled as a result of several inner conflicts. First, the question of living Vienna or not: if he leaves, he ensures safety for him and his family but leaves his fellowmen and the city that watched him grow behind; if he stays, he puts him and his family in danger, but he shows solidarity to the victims and he stays with the city he loves. Then, The Visitor raises another question: is he really God or is he merely a mythomaniac with astounding persuasion powers. Freud desperately wants to believe The Visitor is God, but his reason tells him not to. He is presented as a loving father that would do anything for his children, as a lonely man that needs love from a father he may hate, and as a soft and fragile individual at the brisk of death.

=== Anna ===
Anna is Freud's daughter. Her age is never explicitly revealed on the play, but despite being an adult Freud treats her as a little child. She shows great character strength when she stands up to the Gestapo officer and psychoanalyzes him to account for his disrespectful behavior toward Jews. She is taken for questioning, but she shows no fear, unlike Freud. She reassures him that everything will be fine, and that fear is worthless. She is the voice of reason in her father's life, constantly reminding him to sign the paper that will enable them to leave Vienna and escape the Nazi regime. She proves to be smart and to know how to defend herself.

=== Nazi/ Gestapo officer ===
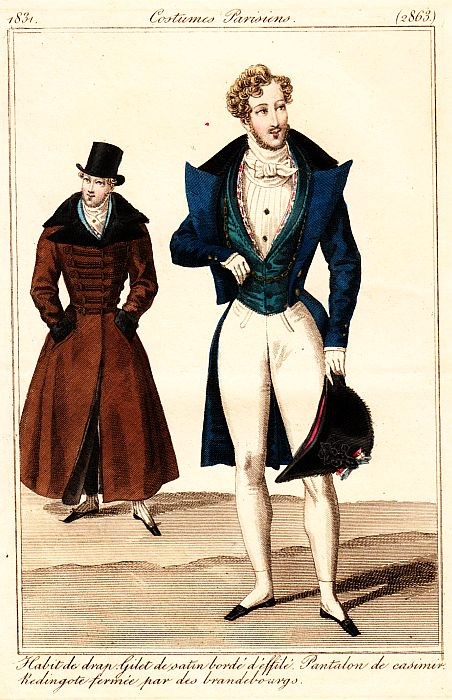
Dandies illustrating how The Visitor was dressed

His character represents the cliché Gestapo officer. Presented in a negative light, he is a violent, brute individual. He is perverse and thirsty for money. He is the one that takes Anna for questioning after she challenges his entire persona and the real reasons why he finds pleasure in humiliating Jews. Although he pretends to be strong, he is weak, full of fears and regrets about the person he is. He returns after taking Anna to get more money from Freud, telling him that he knows about the money he has deposited in other countries. But he flees when Freud, with to the help of The Visitor, notices the great resemblance in his uncle Simon's nose, who was a rabbi, and the officer's.

=== The Visitor ===
Dressed as an opera Dandy, he invades Freud's apartment and refuses to tell him who he is, claiming he would not believe it. After several questions, Freud realizes he is God, but is he really? He bombards Freud with several atheist arguments questioning his own existence, and Freud counterargues saying he must be God, until the Gestapo officer notifies him of a mythomaniac on the loose. He is then referred to as Walter Oberseit, which is the name of the fugitive. Freud then bombards The Visitor with reasons why he cannot be God. However, he isn't Walter Oberseit either. When he is presented to Anna, she sees him as the man that stalks her at the park. Freud, as well as the reader, never knows whether the Visitor is God, or simply a mythomaniac. It is a matter of faith to believe or not.

== Plot ==
=== ACT 1 ===
The reader is introduced to two characters: Freud and Anna. It is 1938, the war is about to begin, and Nazis have already invaded Vienna. Freud, like many other Jews, must leave. In order to do so, he must sign a paper stating he has been treated exceptionally by the Nazi regime. Freud is ill. A commentary is made regarding children and adults: children are naturally born as philosophers because they ask questions, whereas adults are boring because they have stopped asking questions.

=== ACT 2 ===
A new character is introduced: the Gestapo officer. He has already been to Freud's house before, when he confiscated his books to burn them. Now he has returned to ask for money in exchange of “freedom”. Freud indicates where the money is, and the officer is surprised by its quantity. He insults Freud and all other Jews. Anna is infuriated and psychoanalyzes him to cause embarrassment. As a result, she is taken to the Gestapo for questioning. Before leaving, she reminds her father to sign the paper and reassures him that everything will be alright.

=== ACT 3 ===
Freud thinks of the paper. Instead of signing it, he calls the US ambassador to Austria to ask for help regarding the taking of Anna. He promises to pull some strings and reminds him to sign the paper. He begins to sign the paper, but he is insulted by what it says and stops.

=== ACT 4 ===
The Visitor appears, dressed as an opera dandy, out of nowhere. Freud is shocked and demands an explanation. Who is he? Where did he come from? What does he want? How does he know Freud? Because he receives no direct answers to his questions, Freud takes out his revolver. The Visitor calms him down and tells him about his future (the publication of Moses and monotheism, his life in Paris and in London, etc.). Freud is confused because he has not disclosed information about his book with anyone and he is not even sure himself he will leave Vienna. He asks The Visitor again who he is. No response. He attempts to hypnotize and psychoanalyze him. A person without parents, utterly alone in the Universe. Once hypnotized, Freud asks more questions, including when will he die. At that point, The Visitor comes out of the hypnotic state. Freud realizes The Visitor is God. He cannot believe it. To “prove” it The Visitor tells Freud about the time Freud recognized his own existence, which is the same time The Visitor meets Freud for the first time. The latter still does not believe.

=== ACT 5 ===
The Nazi returns. The Visitor hides behind a curtain. Freud persistently asks about Anna, but his replies are vague and perverse. Freud is worried, and to make matters worse, the Nazi asks Freud for the bank accounts mentioned in his will. He says that if he provides him with that money, then Anna will be returned. He says it will be a secret between them two. Freud does not know what to do, he wants Anna back, but the money mentioned in his will is what he has saved for all his children. A monologue follows in which the Nazi insults Jews and blames them for his failures. Then he leaves to give Freud time to think.

=== ACT 6 ===
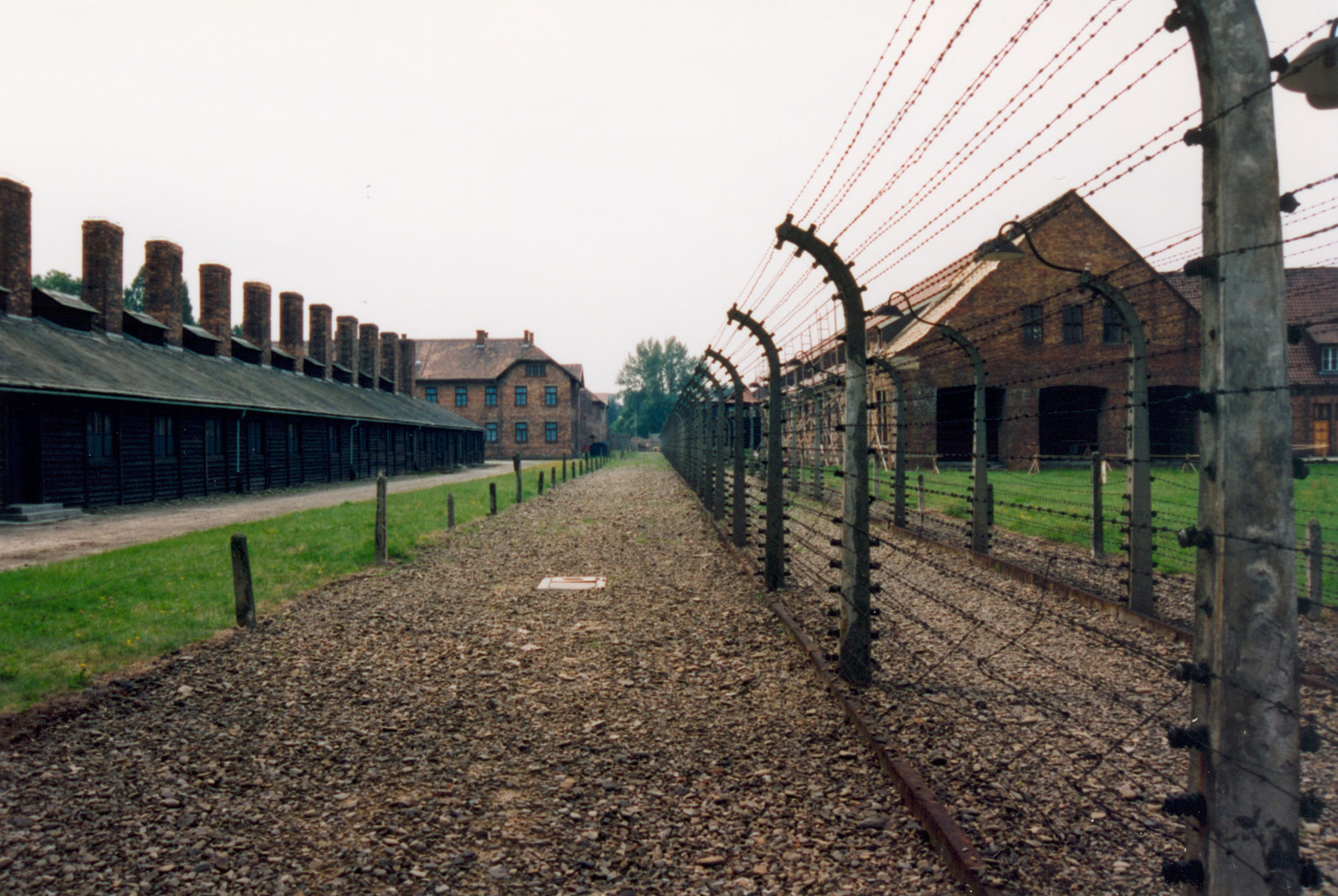
Concentration camps where Jews were beginning to be taken

The Visitor reassures Freud that Anna is okay. He has a vision. She has something in her hand. Freud knows what it is. They had been thinking about suicide, but Freud told her that was not an option because that is what the Nazis wanted them to do. The vision continues. Anna bites herself to call attention. It works, and she is taken to be interrogated. The Visitor is proud of her, because he knows if she is not interrogated, she will be taken to the concentration camps. Freud is reminded to sing the paper. The Nazi returns, and before he enters, The Visitor gives Freud a picture.

=== ACT 7 ===
The picture is of Freud's uncle, who was a Rabbi. Interestingly enough, the Nazi's nose is highly similar to that of the uncle. The situation backfires for the Nazi. He leaves, scared that someone may discover his secret. Before leaving, he tells Freud about a man on the run. His name is Walter Oberseit and he has escaped from the asylum. He is a mythomaniac.

=== ACT 8 ===
The Visitor comes out of his cover and closes the window. Freud is infuriated. He cannot believe he was deceived by a mythomaniac and accuses The Visitor of wasting his time. The Visitor says Walter Oberseit, the runaway, lived for years in a cave in isolation. When he was finally able to speak, he would tell impossible stories and pretend to be a great figure in history. The Visitor tries to tell Freud he is not Walter Oberseit. Freud still does not believe and says he no longer believes in psychoanalysis. He explains why he is an atheist and The Visitor replies an atheist is a man in despair. Freud is troubled. He says he is glad the Visitor is Walter Oberseit and not God, because if he were God, he would accuse him of absolute negligence. The Visitor explains, somewhat annoyed, that he created man free. He is not to blame for what occurred or is occurring and claims the reason behind all those things is greed. Freud is somewhat apologetic but soon changes to a reassuring tone and tells The Visitor to return to the asylum for tonight and he promises he will treat him tomorrow. The Nazi returns.

=== ACT 9 ===
In a more respectful way than before, the Nazi returns to give Freud his will back. Freud asks where Anna is and he says she is still being questioned but she will be back soon. In addition, he informs Freud that they found Walter Oberseit. Freud is hopeful because The Visitor may actually be God.

=== ACT 10 ===
Freud asks again why the Visitor has come. The Visitor explains how boring it is to be God, because you have already seen it all. Outside, a Jewish couple is persecuted and taken to the camps. Freud tells God to do something, but he says he cannot because he is not omnipotent. He lost his omnipotence when he created man and gave him free will. Freud is troubled.

=== ACT 11 ===
Anna returns, and Freud is relieved and exhilarated. She reassures him that she is fine and says that when she was questioned, she denied that the International Association of psychoanalysis had political interests. She also informs Freud about the camps were Jews were taken and criticizes them for staying quiet. Freud tells her it is the best thing to do to prevent any further violence against family members. Then, he insists that she meets the Visitor. She is confused because she sees no one and tells Freud that when she came in, he was sleeping. Anna leaves.

=== ACT 12 ===
The Visitor excuses himself by saying that he had to go to the bathroom. Freud tells him that he must meet Anna. He is reluctant, but Freud convinces him.

=== ACT 13 ===
Anna returns and acts as if she already knows The Visitor.

=== ACT 14 ===
Freud demands an explanation from The Visitor, but he seems as confused as him and denies knowing Anna.

=== ACT 15 ===
Anna says The Visitor is the man that stalks her when she goes to the park. The Visitor and Freud seem surprised, while Anna is annoyed by the presence of The Visitor and leaves again.

=== ACT 16 ===
Freud doubts again. The Visitor explains that everyone projects in him the image that they want to see. He says he must leave, and he thanks Freud for listening to him. Freud desperately wants a definitive answer and tells him not to go out through the window but to disappear in front of his eyes. Despite Freud's wishes, he leaves through the window.

=== ACT 17 ===
Desperate, Freud reaches for the revolver and shoots, but he misses. The Visitor is gone.

== Background ==
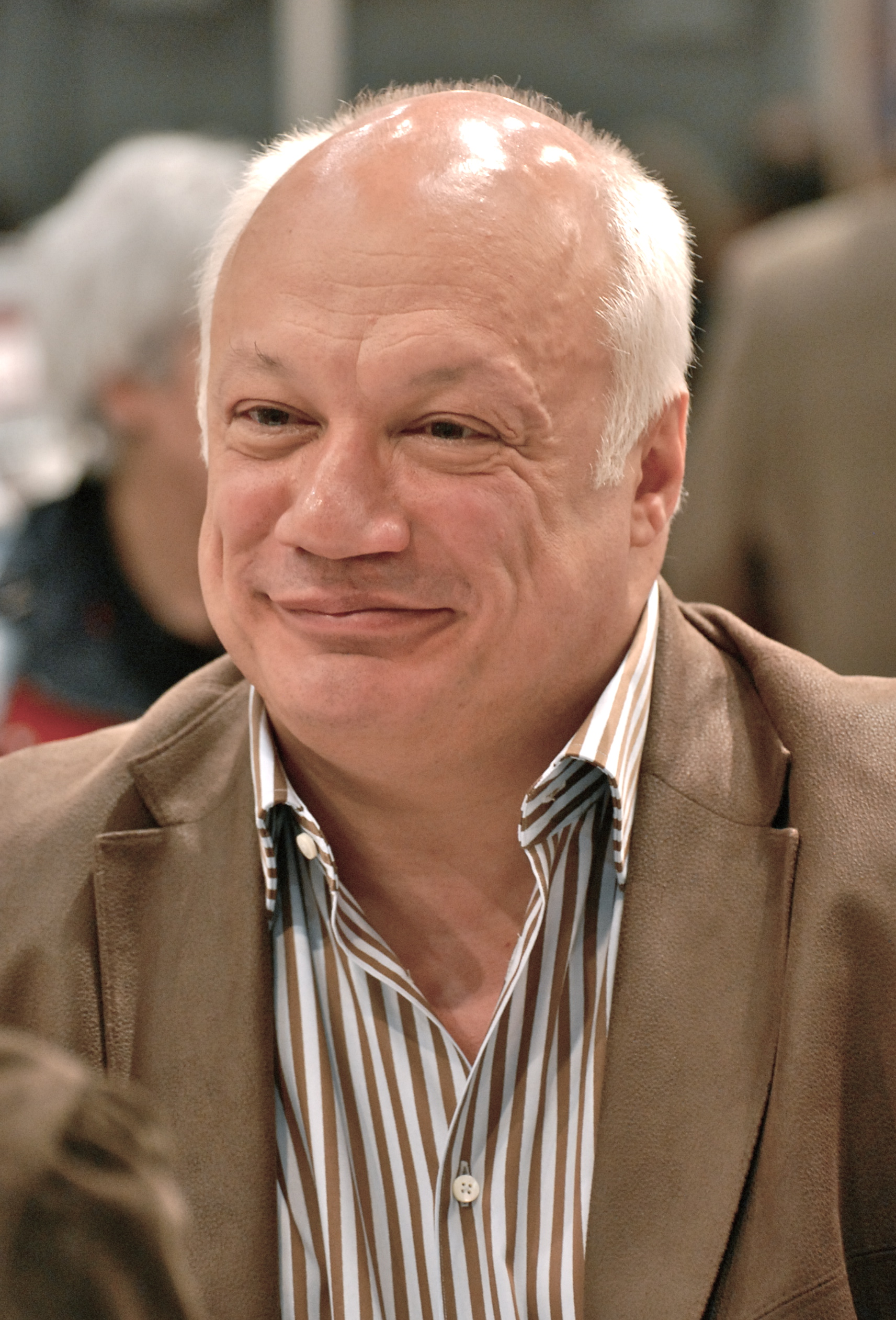
Author of the play

Eric Emmanuel Schmitt received inspiration from this play one day after listening to more bad news on the radio. From his account, he was feeling like Freud (one of the main characters of the play), wondering why God would allow such things to occur. When Schmitt finished writing the play, he read it to three people, and one of them discouraged him from publishing it. For several years it was kept in a drawer, until upon the insistence of various people, it was performed on stage. From that point on, the play and the author have received great praise from the public.

The play also refers to something even The Visitor, who spoke as if he were God, considered ultimately beautiful: Mozart's music. In a podcast the author expressed how this music inspired him to write.

== Critical reception ==
As many other works written by Schmitt, The Visitor was greatly acclaimed by the public. Many important newspapers in France and elsewhere qualified the piece as brilliant, intelligent, captivating, and much more. Stage Door, a long lived website for theater review in Ontario, also offered a positive review of the play but shamed down on the textbook-like philosophy it presented.

The play received three Molières and has been staged in several countries around the world.

Oftentimes, the works by Schmitt do not receive great attention from elite scholars. His books are often dismissed by this group as too traditional, too popular, and such.

== Stage productions and translations ==
The Visitor has been staged in several European countries as well as other countries. Among the list appear France, Italy, Germany, Canada, and the UK.

The play has also been translated into several languages, including English, Catalan, German, Greek, Italian and Polish.
