= What's in a Name? (2012 film) =

- French theatrical release poster
- Le Prénom
- Directed by: Alexandre de La Patellière; Matthieu Delaporte
- Written by: Alexandre de La Patellière
- Screenplay by: Matthieu Delaporte
- Based on: Le Prénom (play) by Alexandre de La Patellière & Matthieu Delaporte
- Starring: Patrick Bruel; Valérie Benguigui; Charles Berling; Judith El Zein; Guillaume de Tonquédec
- Cinematography: David Ungaro
- Edited by: Célia Lafitedupont
- Music by: Jérôme Rebotier
- Production companies: Chapter 2; Pathé
- Distributed by: Alternative Films; Pathé
- Release date: 25 April 2012
- Running time: 109 minutes
- Countries: France; Belgium
- Language: French
- Budget: $11 million
- Box office: $29.5 million

What's in a Name? (original title: Le Prénom, literally "The First Name") is a French-Belgian comedy film, written and directed by Alexandre de La Patellière and Matthieu Delaporte and released in 2012. It is adapted from the play Le Prénom by the same authors. The film was a box office success in France, selling 3,340,231 tickets.

== Plot ==
Vincent, a real estate agent and father-to-be is invited for dinner by his sister Elisabeth and his brother-in-law Pierre. Their childhood friend, Claude (a trombonist for Radio France's orchestra), is also invited. Vincent is a wealthy, successful businessman, while Pierre, a university professor, is much more liberal. Elisabeth is a high school teacher for literature. Vincent's wife Anna is running late because of a business meeting.

While waiting for dinner to be served, Vincent decides to play a practical joke by pretending that his unborn son will be named Adolphe after the French literary hero. This causes a huge argument between Vincent and Pierre about whether this name can be appropriate considering its obvious connection to Adolf Hitler. Vincent tells Claude that this is a joke and Elisabeth is too busy preparing dinner to fully participate. This argument escalates and exposes a variety of old grievances and resentments between the four friends. Vincent is selfish, hypocritical and vain, with a humorous facial expression whenever he lies. Pierre is snobbish, miserly and condescending while Vincent finds the names of his children absurd. While Claude is mocked for his surname and his effeminate habits. Meanwhile, Elisabeth continues to be occupied by cooking and angry that the three men keep joking around without her. There is a lull in the argument until Anna arrives which reignites the conversation and exposes more rifts between all the characters.

Some huge revelations are brought to light after the meal is finished. Claude resents the questioning of his sexuality and reveals he has been seeing a woman for a while now but refuses to divulge more information. Pierre confesses to having killed a family pet during their childhood when Vincent had taken the blame for it at the time. Meanwhile, Anna is frustrated that Vincent has not tried to learn more about her career despite her success. When pressed for more information about his mysterious partner, Claude eventually reveals that it is Vincent and Elisabeth's mother Françoise. In his shock, Vincent strikes Claude while everyone struggles to understand the revelation. After a brief pause, Elisabeth calls her mother and discovers the full truth of the matter. It is also revealed that Anna knew of this affair which further shocks everyone and raises the tension. In her frustration, Elisabeth confesses her long held resentments against her husband, brother and childhood friend. Vincent had always been the favorite child who was always forgiven. Claude had deeply betrayed her trust by not sharing his secret affair and she is furious with Pierre, having sacrificed her own academic career to support Pierre. In addition she feels as though he is not sharing their shared burden of parenthood and his hypocrisy is brought up once again.

This leaves a quiet in the room as Anna and Elisabeth make their opinions clear. Anna is tired and disappointed with Vincent's childish and selfish behaviour, warning a divorce if he doesn't change his behaviour before accompanying Claude to see Françoise. Elisabeth tells Pierre that he will be in charge of cleaning up dinner, putting their children to bed and will be sleeping on the couch until further notice. This leaves Pierre and Vincent alone in the living room. They share a bottle of rose and joke around slightly to ease the tension still present.

4 months later, Pierre, Elisabeth, Claude and Françoise arrive to visit Vincent and Anna at the hospital to see their child, who is unexpectedly a daughter. Everyone is told that she will be named Françoise.

== Cast ==
- Patrick Bruel - Vincent
- Valérie Benguigui - Élisabeth
- Charles Berling - Pierre
- Guillaume de Tonquédec - Claude
- Judith El Zein - Anna
- Françoise Fabian - Françoise

== Awards ==
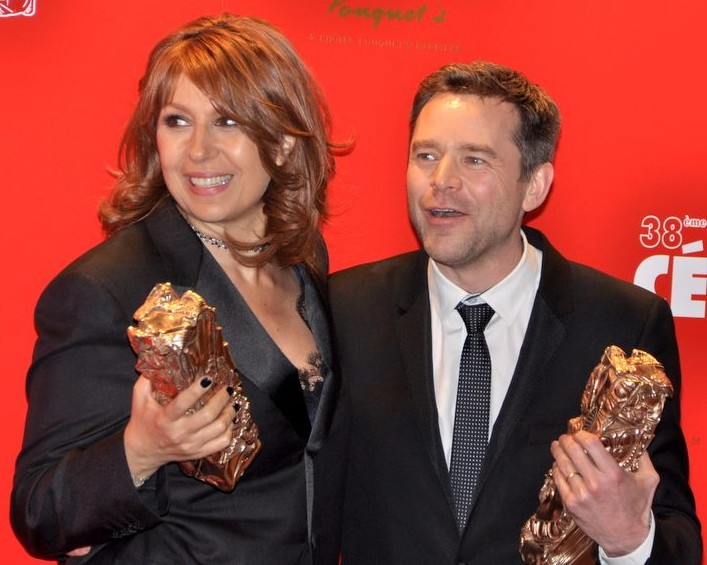
Valérie Benguigui (left) and Guillaume de Tonquédec, César Award for Best Supporting Actress and Actor.

The film had five nominations at the 38th César Awards, winning in the categories Best Supporting Actress (Valérie Benguigui) and Best Supporting Actor (Guillaume de Tonquédec).

The movie has won two awards at film festivals in Canada: the Grand Prix Hydro-Québec at the Abitibi-Témiscamingue International Film Festival, and the Radio Canada Audience Award at the Cinéfranco International Francophone Film Festival in Toronto.

== Remakes ==
The same theatrical piece was adapted by Francesca Archibugi and Francesco Piccolo and led to the creation of the film Il nome del Figlio, released in Italian cinemas on 22 January 2015.

A further adaptation of the theater piece was made in Germany: Der Vorname, released in German cinemas on 19 October 2018. The film had two sequels: Der Nachname (2022) and Der Spitzname (2024).
