= Home (Mirbeau play) =

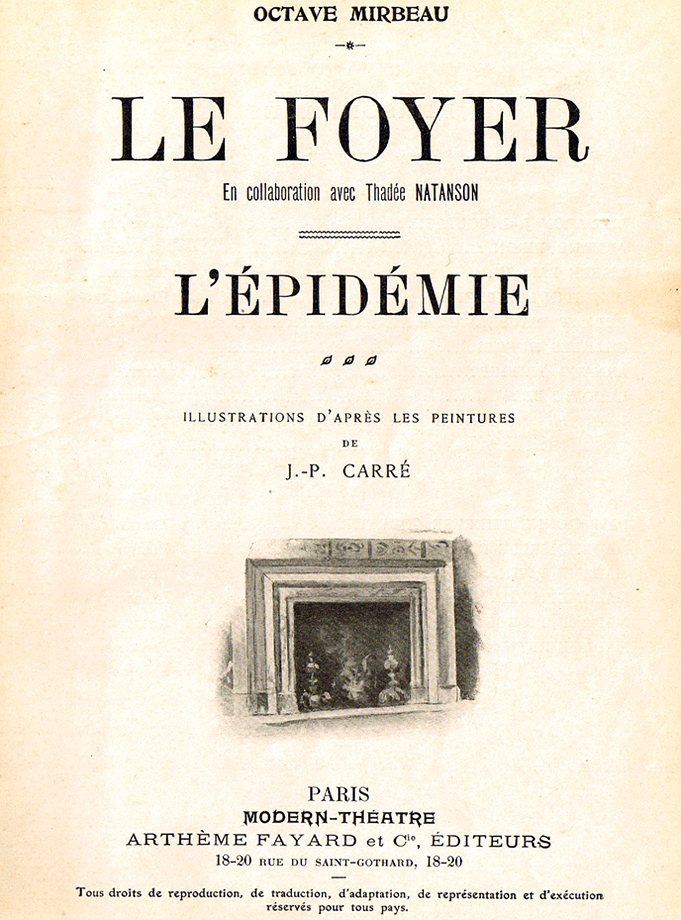
- Written by: Octave Mirbeau
- Original language: French
- Genre: Comedy

Premiere
- Date premiered: December 1908

Home, also translated as Charity (French: Le Foyer), is a French three-act comedy by the novelist and playwright Octave Mirbeau, written in collaboration with Thadée Natanson. It was performed in December 1908 on the stage of the Comédie-Française, in Paris.

The comedy raised a big scandal because in it Mirbeau denounces the Catholic charity-business and broaches a new taboo subject : the economic and sexual exploitation of young girls in "charitable" homes. In order to see his play performed as intended, he brought a suit against Jules Claretie and the Comédie-Française. He won his trial and the comedy could at last be performed.

An English translation, by Richard Hand, has been published by Intellect Books : Two Plays: "Business is Business" and "Charity", January 2012, 147 pages (ISBN 9781841504865).

== Plot ==
Like Business is business, Le Foyer is a comedy of manners and characters in the tradition of Molière. It respects the unity of time and the unity of action.

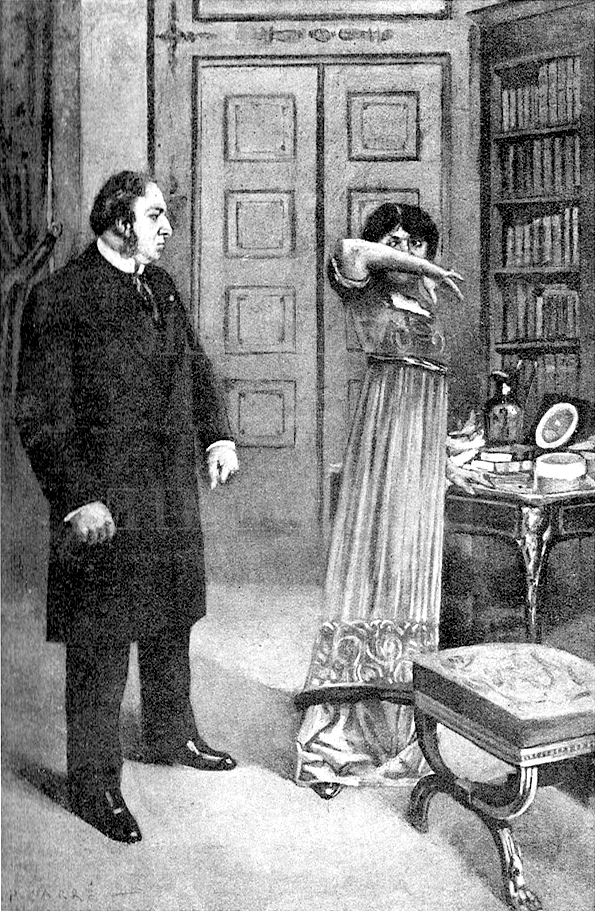
Courtin — Misérable ! Tais-toi !… Tais-toi !…

The main character, Baron Courtin, is a conservative senator and a respectable Academician, who founded works of charity. But he has embezzled money from the "charitable" Foyer (Home) over which he presides : he risks all at once ruin, dishonor, and prison. But he escapes punishment. First, thanks to the former lover of his wife Thérèse, the old financier Biron, who is cynical yet still in love, and to whom he forces the baroness to go and beg for his help, while she has given him up for young d'Auberval: Biron accepts paying for Courtin, but he means to recover the money by exploiting even more fiercely the work of the little girls of the Foyer. Then, thanks to an agreement made with the republican government : the government lets bygones be bygones in exchange for his silence in an important debate in the Parliament.

On board Biron's cruise boat, Courtin will be able to polish at leisure his speech on the price of virtue, in the company of the two lovers of his wife, the former and the new one...
