= Valérie Benguigui =

French actress and theater director

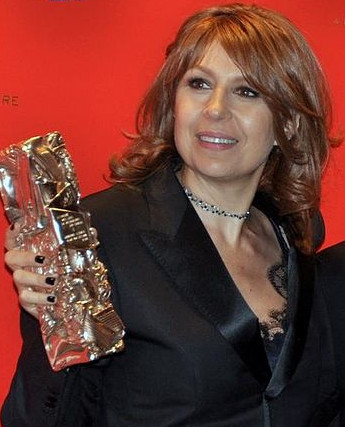
- Benguigui at the 2013 César Awards
- Born: Valérie Clotilde Benguigui; 8 July 1961; Oran, Algeria
- Died: 2 September 2013 (aged 52); Paris, France
- Resting place: Montparnasse Cemetery; 48.84°N 2.33°E
- Occupation: Actress
- Years active: 1986–2012
- Known for: What's in a Name? (Le Prénom)
- Spouse: Eric Wapler (m. 1995)
- Children: 2
- Awards: César Award; 2013 Best Supporting Actress; What's in a Name? (Le Prénom)

Valérie Benguigui (8 July 1961 – 2 September 2013) was a French actress and theater director. Born in Oran, Algeria, she took acting courses at the Cours Florent and the National Chaillot Theatre School. Her first film role was in Francis Huster's On a volé Charlie Spencer (1986).

Her most successful television role was in the series Avocats et Associés, in which she appeared from 2000 to 2005. She also produced and directed several plays at this time. In 2012, she portrayed Élisabeth in the film What's in a Name? (Le Prénom), which earned her a César Award for Best Supporting Actress, as well as a Molière Award nomination for Best Supporting Actress.

== Personal life ==
Benguigui was married to actor and restaurant manager Eric Wapler, whom she met while studying at Cours Florent. They had two children.

== Death ==
Benguigui died from breast cancer, aged 52, on 2 September 2013 in Paris. She had had the disease for three years. Benguigui was buried at Montparnasse Cemetery.

== Theater ==
Year	Title	Author	Director	Notes
1992	La Princesse d'Élide	Molière	Jean-Luc Revol	
1993	Le Plus Heureux des trois	Eugène Labiche	Jean-Luc Revol (2)	
2005	Pour ceux qui restent	Pascal Elbé	Charles Berling	
2007	The Memory of Water	Shelagh Stephenson	Bernard Murat	
2010	What's in a Name?	Matthieu Delaporte; Alexandre de la Patellière	Bernard Murat (2)	Nominated - Molière Award for Best Supporting Actress
2012	Le Dindon	Georges Feydeau	Bernard Murat (3)	

== Filmography ==
Year	Title	Role	Director	Notes
1986	On a volé Charlie Spencer!		Francis Huster	
1989	Palace	Various	Jean-Michel Ribes	TV series
1997	I Got a Woman	The Actress	Yvan Attal	Short
1997	La Vérité si je mens !	Élie	Thomas Gilou	
1997	Le bonheur est un mensonge		Patrick Dewolf	TV movie
1997	Straight into the Wall	The interpreter	Pierre Richard	
1999	Accidents		Pascal Laëthier	Short
1999	Mes amis	The camerawoman	Michel Hazanavicius	
1999	My Father, My Mother, My Brothers and My Sisters	Martine	Charlotte de Turckheim	
1999	The Journey to Paris		Marc-Henri Dufresne	
2000	Drug Scenes		Isabelle Doval	TV series (1 episode)
2000	Jet Set	The Baroness	Fabien Onteniente	
2001	Chaos	Medecin	Coline Serreau	
2001	A Hell of a Day	Stéphanie	Marion Vernoux	
2001	Gregoire Moulin vs. Humanity	Madame Moulin	Artus de Penguern	
2001-05	Avocats et Associés	Nadia Botkine	Several	TV series (48 episodes)
2002	Ces jours heureux	Madame Gabison	Éric Toledano and Olivier Nakache	Short
2003	Laughter and Punishment	Audrey	Isabelle Doval (2)	
2004	The Grand Role	Viviane	Steve Suissa	
2004	The Role of Her Life	Hélène	François Favrat	
2005	Let's Be Friends	Eva	Éric Toledano and Olivier Nakache (2)	
2005	Cavalcade	Sexologist	Steve Suissa (2)	
2006	Hey Good Looking !	Alice	Lisa Azuelos	
2006	Charlie Says	Charlie's mother	Nicole Garcia	
2006-07	Kaamelott	Prisca	Alexandre Astier	TV series (5 episodes)
2007	Pur week-end	Véronique Alvaro	Olivier Doran	
2007	I Hate My Best Friends' Kids	Louise	Anne Fassio	
2007	La Vie d'artiste	Solange	Marc Fitoussi	
2007	Two Lives Plus One	Valentine	Idit Cebula	
2008	Baby Blues	France Laud	Diane Bertrand	
2008	Drôle de Noël!	Mélanie	Nicolas Picard	TV movie
2009	Safari	Magalie	Olivier Baroux	
2009	La famille Wolberg	Marianne	Axelle Ropert	
2009	Jusqu'à toi	Myriam	Jennifer Devoldère	
2009	La sainte Victoire	Michèle Dalembert	François Favrat (2)	
2010	Turk's Head	Yelda	Pascal Elbé	
2010	My Father's Guests	Karine Paumelle	Anne Le Ny	
2010	The Italian	Hélène	Olivier Baroux (2)	
2011	Les Tuche	Claudia	Olivier Baroux (3)	
2012	What's in a Name?	Élisabeth	Alexandre de La Patellière & Matthieu Delaporte	César Award for Best Supporting Actress
2014	Fiston	Sophie	Pascal Bourdiaux	
