= Semprún =

Semprun or Semprún may refer to:

- Carlos Semprún (1926-2009), Spanish writer
- Jaime Semprún (1947–2010), French essayist
- Jorge Semprún (1923–2011), Spanish writer and politician
- José Alejandro Semprún (born 1973), Venezuelan long-distance runners
- Pablo Semprún (born 1964), Spanish tennis and padel tennis player
- Patricia Carola Velásquez Semprún (born 1971), Venezuelan actress and model
- Manuel Semprún y Pombo (1868–1929), Spanish lawyer
