= Molière Award for Best Director =

Molière Award for Best Director. Winners and nominees.

- 1987 : Jean-Pierre Vincent for The Marriage of Figaro (Le Mariage de Figaro)
  - Robert Hossein, for Kean
  - Jorge Lavelli, for A Midsummer Night's Dream (Le Songe d'une nuit d'été)
  - Sophie Loucachevski, for Madame de Sade
  - Pierre Mondy, pour Two into One (C'est encore mieux l'après-midi)
  - Jérôme Savary, pour Cabaret
- 1988 : Laurent Terzieff pour Fall (Ce que voit Fox)
  - Robert Hossein for L'Affaire du courrier de Lyon
  - Bernard Murat for L'Éloignement
  - Antoine Vitez for The Satin Slipper (Le Soulier de satin)
  - Georges Wilson for Je ne suis pas Rappaport
- 1989 : Patrice Chéreau for Hamlet
  - Maurice Benichou for Une absence
  - Jorge Lavelli for Réveille-toi Philadelphie
  - Pierre Mondy for La Présidente
  - Jean-Pierre Vincent for Le Faiseur de théâtre
- 1990 : Gérard Caillaud for Les Palmes de Monsieur Schutz
  - Luc Bondy for The Lonely Way (Le Chemin solitaire)
  - Matthias Langhoff for Miss Julie (Mademoiselle Julie)
  - Jorge Lavelli for Greek
  - Jean-Pierre Miquel for The Supper (Le Souper)
- 1991 : Peter Brook for The Tempest (La Tempête)
  - Philippe Adrien for The Annunciation of Marie (L'Annonce faite à Marie)
  - Alain Françon for The Girl from Maxim's (La Dame de chez Maxim)
  - Jorge Lavelli for Heldenplatz
  - Georges Wilson for Eurydice
- 1992 : Stéphan Meldegg for Cuisine et dépendances
  - Patrice Chéreau for Time and the Room (Le Temps et la chambre)
  - Jorge Lavelli for Comédies barbares
  - Marcel Maréchal for Mr Puntila and his Man Matti (Maître Puntila et son valet Matti)
  - Bernard Murat for Célimène et le Cardinal
- 1993 : Laurent Terzieff for Another Time (Temps contre temps)
  - André Engel for Légendes de la forêt viennoise
  - Matthias Langhoff for Désir sous les ormes
  - Jorge Lavelli for Macbett
  - Jean-Louis Martinelli for L'Eglise
- 1994 : Benno Besson for Quisaitout et Grobêta
  - Jean-Luc Boutté for La Volupté de l'honneur
  - Terry Hands for Hamlet
  - Patrice Kerbrat for Ce qui arrive et ce qu'on attend
  - Gérard Vergez for The Visitor (Le Visiteur)
- 1995 : Alain Françon for The War Plays (Pièces de guerre)
  - Patrice Kerbrat for "Art"
  - Stephan Meldegg for Un air de famille
  - Jean-Michel Ribes for Brèves de comptoir
  - Régis Santon for Business is business (Les Affaires sont les affaires)
- 1996 : Patrice Chéreau for In the Solitude of Cotton Fields (Dans la solitude des champs de coton)
  - Benno Besson for Lapin lapin
  - Adrian Brine for An Ideal Husband (Un mari idéal)
  - Jorge Lavelli for Décadence
  - Stephan Meldegg, Rita Russek for Scènes de la vie conjugale
- 1997 : Alain Sachs for Le Passe-muraille
  - Gildas Bourdet for The Two Venetian Twins (Les Jumeaux vénitiens)
  - Patrice Kerbrat for Waiting for Godot (En attendant Godot)
  - Didier Long for Le Roman de Lulu
  - Roman Polanski for Master Class
- 1998 : Jean-Louis Benoît for Les Fourberies de Scapin
  - Benno Besson for Le Roi cerf
  - Marion Bierry for L'Écornifleur
  - Patrice Kerbrat for Uncle Vanya (Oncle Vania)
  - Stephan Meldegg for Popcorn
- 1999 : Gildas Bourdet for L'Atelier
  - Nicolas Briançon for Jacques and His Master (Jacques et son maître)
  - Patrice Kerbrat for Tout contre
  - Didier Long for Miss Else (Mademoiselle Else)
  - Jean-Michel Ribes for Rêver peut-être
- 2000 : Ariane Mnouchkine for Tambours sur la digue
  - Marcel Bluwal for A torts et à raisons
  - Gildas Bourdet for Raisons de famille
  - Irina Brook for Morphic Resonance (Résonances)
  - Jacques Echantillon for Accidental Death of an Anarchist (Mort accidentelle d'un anarchiste)
- 2001 : Irina Brook for Beast on the Moon (Une bête sur la Lune)
  - Benno Besson for The Caucasian Chalk Circle (Le Cercle de craie caucasien)
  - Étienne Bierry for Les Directeurs
  - Marcel Bluwal for Le Grand Retour de Boris S
  - Didier Long for Becket or The Honor of God (Becket ou l'Honneur de Dieu)
- 2002 : Jean-Jacques Zilbermann for The Shop Around the Corner (La Boutique au coin de la rue)
  - Annick Blancheteau for La Griffe (A71)
  - Patrice Kerbrat for Elvire
  - Didier Long for Jalousie en trois fax
  - Alain Sachs for Madame Sans-Gêne
- 2003 : Stéphane Hillel for Un petit jeu sans conséquence
  - Peter Brook for Le Costume
  - Didier Caron for Un vrai bonheur
  - Patrice Chéreau for Phèdre
  - John Malkovich for Hysteria
- 2004 : Zabou Breitman for L'Hiver sous la table
  - Stephan Meldegg, for Des cailloux plein les poches
  - José Paul, for Things We Do for Love (L'amour est enfant de salaud)
  - Yves Pignot, for ...Comme en 14 !
  - Jean-Luc Tardieu, for Signé Dumas
- 2005 : Didier Bezace for The Browning Version (La Version de Browning)
  - Irina Brook for L'Île des esclaves
  - André Engel for Le Jugement dernier
  - Stéphane Hillel for Amadeus
  - Jean-Luc Moreau for Camille C.
  - Jean-François Sivadier for Italienne scène et orchestre
- 2006 : James Thiérrée for The Junebug Symphony (La Symphonie du hanneton)
  - Agnès Boury and José Paul for La Sainte Catherine
  - Nicolas Briançon for Pygmalion
  - Hans-Peter Cloos for Le Caïman
  - André Engel for King Lear (Le Roi Lear)
  - Hélène Vincent for Creditors (Créanciers)
- 2007 : Denis Podalydès for Cyrano de Bergerac
  - Marion Bierry for L'Illusion Comique
  - Agnès Boury and José Paul for Chocolat piment
  - Didier Long for The Caretaker (Le Gardien)
  - Jean-Luc Revol for Le Cabaret des hommes perdus
- 2008 : John Malkovich for Good Canary
  - Luc Bondy for La Seconde Surprise de l'amour
  - Alain Françon for L'Hôtel du libre échange
  - Didier Long for The Life Before Us (La Vie devant soi)
- 2009 : Christian Schiaretti for Coriolanus (Coriolan)
  - Stéphane Braunschweig for Tartuffe
  - Benoît Lavigne for Baby Doll
  - Christophe Lidon for Le Diable rouge
  - Didier Long for Equus
  - Stanislas Nordey for Incendies
- 2010 : Alain Françon for The Cherry Orchard (La Cerisaie)
  - Nicolas Briançon for Twelfth Night (La Nuit des rois)
  - Éric Métayer for The 39 Steps (Les 39 marches)
  - Jean-Luc Moreau for L'Illusion conjugale
  - Claude Régy for Ode maritime
  - Jean-François Sivadier for The Girl from Maxim's (La Dame de chez Maxim)
- 2011 : Julien Sibre for Le Repas des fauves
  - Philippe Adrien for Sauce for the Goose (Le Dindon)
  - Patrice Chéreau for Autumn Dream (Rêve d’Automne)
  - Marcial Di Fonzo Bo for La Mère
  - Bernard Murat for Le Prénom
  - Joël Pommerat for Ma chambre froide
