= Molière Award =

Award for French theatre

Coordinates: 48.7772°N 2.4541°E

Les Molières
- Logo of the awards
- Awarded for: Excellence in French theatre
- Country: France
- Presented by: Association professionnelle et artistique du théâtre (APAT)
- First award: 1987; 39 years ago
- Website: www.lesmolieres.com

Les Molières (French: [lə mɔljɛʁ]) is the national theatre award of France, recognising achievement in French theatre each year. The awards are considered the highest honour for productions and performances. Presided and decided by the Association professionnelle et artistique du théâtre (APAT), they are supported by the Ministry of Culture in a ceremony held annually, called the Nuit des Molières ("Night of the Molières"), in Paris.

Les Molières are considered the highest French theatre honour, the equivalent to the American Tony Award, the British Olivier Award, and the Spanish Premios Max. The award was created by Georges Cravenne, who was also the creator of the César Awards for cinema. The name of the award is an homage to the seventeenth-century French dramatist Molière.

== Awards by year and category ==
=== 1987 ===
Jury presided by Jean-Louis Barrault. Awards hosted by François Périer.

- Best Actor – Philippe Clévenot, in Elvire Jouvet 40
- Best Supporting Actor – Pierre Arditi, in La Répétition ou l'Amour puni (The Rehearsal)
- Best Male Newcomer – Philippe Caubère, in Ariane ou l'Âge d'or
- Best Actress – Suzanne Flon, in Léopold le bien aimé
- Best Supporting Actress – Sabine Haudepin, in Kean
- Best Female Newcomer – Ute Lemper, in Cabaret
- Best Show in an Independent theatre – Ariane ou l'Âge d'or, at the Théâtre des Arts/Théâtre Tristan-Bernard
- Best Show in a National theatre – La Folle Journée ou le Mariage de Figaro (The Marriage of Figaro), at the Théâtre national de Chaillot
- Best Musical – Cabaret, at the Théâtre du 8ème (Lyon)
- Best Adaptation of a Foreign Play – Jean-Loup Dabadie, for Deux sur la balançoire (Two for the Seesaw)
- Best Playwright – Yasmina Reza, for Conversations après un enterrement (Conversations After a Burial)
- Best Director – Jean-Pierre Vincent, for La Folle Journée ou le Mariage de Figaro (The Marriage of Figaro)
- Best Costumes – Yannis Kokkos, for Madame de Sade
- Best Stage Design/Set – Yannis Kokkos, for L'Échange

=== 1988 ===
Jury presided by. Awards hosted by.

- Best Actor – Jacques Dufilho in Je ne suis pas Rappaport
- Best Supporting Actor – Pierre Vaneck in Le Secret (The Secret)
- Best Actress – Jeanne Moreau in Le Récit de la servante Zerline (Zerline's Tale)
- Best Supporting Actress – Catherine Salviat in Dialogue des carmélites (Dialogues of the Carmelites)
- Best Newcomer – Thierry Fortineau in Journal d'un curé de campagne (Diary of a Country Priest)
- Best Show in an Independent theatre – Ce que voit Fox (Fall) at the Théâtre La Bruyère
- Best Show in a National theatre – Le Soulier de satin (The Satin Slipper) at the Théâtre national de Chaillot
- Best Musical – Les Petits Pas at the Théâtre des Bouffes du Nord
- Best Adaptation of a Foreign Play – Jean-Claude Grumberg for Mort d'un commis voyageur (Death of a Salesman)
- Best Playwright – Loleh Bellon for L'Éloignement
- Best Director – Laurent Terzieff for Ce que voit Fox (Fall)
- Best Costumes – Jacques Schmidt for Georges Dandin
- Best Stage Design/Set – Ezio Frigerio for George Dandin

=== 1989 ===
Jury presided by. Awards hosted by.

- Best Actor – Gérard Desarthe in Hamlet
- Best Supporting Actor – Étienne Chicot in Une absence
- Best Actress – María Casares in Hécube (Hecuba)
- Best Supporting Actress – Christine Murillo in La Mouette (The Seagull)
- Best Newcomer – Elisabeth Maccoco in Callas (Master Class)
- Best Show in an Independent theatre – L'Avare (The Miser) at the Théâtre du Marais
- Best Show in a National theatre – Le Foyer at the Théâtre de la Plaine
- Best Musical – Cats at the Théâtre de Paris
- Best Adaptation of a Foreign Play – Dominique Deschamps for Je ne suis pas Rappaport (I'm Not Rappaport)
- Best Playwright – François Billetdoux for Réveille-toi Philadelphie !
- Best Director – Patrice Chéreau for Hamlet
- Best Costumes – Jacques Schmidt for Hamlet
- Best Stage Design/Set – Richard Peduzzi for Hamlet

=== 1990 ===
Jury presided by. Awards hosted by.

- Best Actor – Pierre Dux in Quelque part dans cette vie
- Best Supporting Actor – Michel Robin in La Traversée de l'hiver (The Passage of Winter)
- Best Actress – Denise Gence in Avant la retraite
- Best Supporting Actress – Judith Magre in Greek
- Best Newcomer – Redjep Mitrovitsa in Lorenzaccio
- Best Show in an Independent theatre – Les Palmes de Monsieur Schutz at the Théâtre des Mathurins
- Best Show in a National theatre – Greek at the Théâtre national de la Colline
- Best Musical – Tempo at the Théâtre Fontaine
- Best Adaptation of a Foreign Play – Michel Butel for Le Chemin solitaire
- Best Playwright – Jean-Noël Fenwick for Les Palmes de Monsieur Schutz
- Best Director – Gérard Caillaud for Les Palmes de Monsieur Schutz
- Best Costumes – Patrice Cauchetier for La Mère coupable ou l'Autre Tartuffe
- Best Stage Design/Set – Jacques Voizot for Les Palmes de Monsieur Schutz
- Best Fringe Production – Yasmina Reza for La Traversée de l'hiver (The Passage of Winter)

=== 1991 ===
Jury presided by. Awards hosted by.

- Best Actor – Guy Tréjan in Heldenplatz
- Best Supporting Actor – Jean-Paul Roussillon in Zone libre
- Best Actress – Dominique Valadié in La Dame de chez Maxim (The Girl from Maxim's)
- Best Supporting Actress – Catherine Arditi in A croquer... ou l'ivre de cuisine
- Best Female Newcomer – Sophie Marceau in Eurydice
- Best Show in an Independent theatre – Le Souper at the Théâtre Montparnasse
- Best Show in a National theatre – La Tempête at the Théâtre des Bouffes du Nord
- Best Musical – Christophe Colomb at the TLP Dejazet
- Best Adaptation of a Foreign Play – Jean-Claude Carrière for La Tempête (The Tempest)
- Best Playwright – Jean-Claude Grumberg for Zone libre
- Best Director – Peter Brook for La Tempête (The Tempest)
- Best Costumes – Dominique Borg for La Cerisaie (The Cherry Orchard)
- Best Stage Design/Set – Louis Bercut for Heldenplatz

=== 1992 ===
Jury presided by. Awards hosted by.

- Best Actor – Henri Virlogeux in L'Antichambre
- Best Supporting Actor – Robert Hirsch in Le Misanthrope
- Best Actress – Ludmila Mikaël in Célimène et le Cardinal
- Best Supporting Actress – Danièle Lebrun in Le Misanthrope
- Best Newcomer – Stéphane Freiss in C'était bien
- Best Show in an Independent theatre – Cuisine et dépendances at the Théâtre La Bruyère
- Best Show in a National theatre – Le Temps et la chambre at the Théâtre de l'Odéon
- Best Musical – Les Misérables at the Théâtre Mogador
- Best Adaptation of a Foreign Play – Jean Poiret for Sans rancune
- Best Playwright – Agnès Jaoui and Jean-Pierre Bacri for Cuisine et dépendances
- Best Director – Stéphan Meldegg for Cuisine et dépendances
- Best Costumes – Bernadette Villard for Célimène et le Cardinal
- Best Stage Design/Set – Nicolas Sire for Célimène et le Cardinal

=== 1993 ===
Jury presided by. Awards hosted by.

- Best Actor – Michel Aumont in Macbett
- Best Supporting Actor – Jean-Pierre Sentier in L'Eglise
- Best Actress – Edwige Feuillère in Edwige Feuillère en scène
- Best Supporting Actress – Françoise Bertin in Temps contre temps
- Best Newcomer – Emmanuelle Laborit in Les Enfants du silence
- Best Show in an Independent theatre – Temps contre temps at the Théâtre La Bruyère
- Best Show in a National theatre – La Serva amorosa at the Comédie-Française
- Best Musical – Mortadella at the Théâtre Montparnasse and La Cigale
- Best Adaptation of a Foreign Play – Jean Dalric and Jacques Collard for Les Enfants du silence
- Best Playwright – René de Obaldia for Monsieur Klebs et Rozalie
- Best Director – Laurent Terzieff for Temps contre temps (Another Time)
- Best Costumes – Nicole Galerne for Légende de la forêt viennoise
- Best Stage Design/Set – Nicky Rieri for Légende de la forêt viennoise

=== 1994 ===
Jury presided by. Awards hosted by.

- Best Actor – Jean-Pierre Marielle in Le Retour (The Homecoming)
- Best Supporting Actor – Roland Blanche in La Résistible ascension d'Arturo Ui (The Resistible Rise of Arturo Ui)
- Best Actress – Tsilla Chelton in Les Chaises (The Chairs)
- Best Supporting Actress – Annick Alane in Tailleur pour dames
- Best Newcomer – Éric-Emmanuel Schmitt (Playwright) for Le Visiteur (The Visitor)
- Best Show in an Independent theatre – Le Visiteur (The Visitor) at the Théâtre de Paris
- Best Show in a National theatre – Comment va le monde, Môssieu ? Il tourne, Môssieu ! at the Théâtre national de la Colline
- Best Musical – Le Quatuor at the Théâtre Dejazet
- Best Adaptation of a Foreign Play – Attica Guedj and Stéphan Meldegg for L'Ampoule magique (The Floating Light Bulb)
- Best Playwright – Éric-Emmanuel Schmitt for Le Libertin (The Libertine)
- Best Director – Benno Besson for Quisaitout et Grobêta
- Best Costumes – Jean-Marc Stehlé for Quisaitout et Grobêta
- Best Stage Design/Set – Jean-Marc Stehlé for Quisaitout et Grobêta

=== 1995 ===
Jury presided by. Awards hosted by.

- Best Actor – Pierre Meyrand in Les Affaires sont les affaires (Business is business)
- Best Supporting Actor – Darry Cowl in On purge bébé (Baby's Laxative) and Feu la mère de Madame (Madame's Late Mother)
- Best Actress – Suzanne Flon in La Chambre d'amis
- Best Supporting Actress – Catherine Frot in Un air de famille
- Best Newcomer – Didier Bezace in La Femme changée en renard
- Best Show in an Independent theatre – "Art" at the Comédie des Champs-Élysées
- Best Show in a National theatre – Les Affaires sont les affaires (Business is business) at La Limmousine
- Best Musical – Les Années Twist at the Folies Bergère
- Best Adaptation of a Foreign Play – Jean-Claude Grumberg for Encore une histoire d'amour
- Best Playwright – Yasmina Reza for "Art"
- Best Director – Alain Françon for Pièces de guerre (The War Plays)
- Best Costumes – Michel Dussarat for Chantecler
- Best Stage Design/Set – Claude Plet for Les Affaires sont les affaires (Business is business)
- Best Author – Yasmina Reza for "Art"

=== 1996 ===
Jury presided by. Awards hosted by.

- Best Actor – Didier Sandre in Un mari idéal (An Ideal Husband)
- Best Supporting Actor – Jean-Paul Roussillon in Colombe (Mademoiselle Colombe)
- Best Actress – Christiane Cohendy in Décadence
- Best Supporting Actress – Sonia Vollereaux in Lapin, lapin
- Best Newcomer – Nathalie Cerda in Piaf, je t'aime
- Best Show in an Independent theatre – Monsieur Schpill et Monsieur Tippeton by La Compagnie Eroc
- Best Show in a National theatre – Un mari idéal (An Ideal Husband) at the Théâtre Antoine
- Best Musical – Chimère by Théâtre Zingaro
- Best Adaptation of a Foreign Play – Jean-Michel Déprats for L'Importance d'être Constant (The Importance of Being Earnest)
- Best Playwright – Gilles Segal for Monsieur Schpill et Monsieur Tippeton
- Best Director – Patrice Chéreau for Dans la solitude des champs de coton
- Best Costumes – Christian Lacroix for Phèdre
- Best Stage Design/Set – Jacques Noël for Noël chez les Cupiello

=== 1997 ===
Jury presided by. Awards hosted by.

- Best Actor – Pierre Cassignard in Les Jumeaux vénitiens (The Two Venetian Twins)
- Best Supporting Actor – Robert Hirsch in En attendant Godot (Waiting for Godot)
- Best Actress – Myriam Boyer in Qui a peur de Virginia Woolf? (Who's Afraid of Virginia Woolf?)
- Best Supporting Actress – Dominique Blanchar in Tout comme il faut
- Best Newcomer – Sandrine Kiberlain in Le Roman de Lulu
- Best Show : New Play – Kinkali at the Théâtre national de la Colline
- Best Show : Classical Play – Les Jumeaux vénitiens (The Two Venetian Twins) at the Théâtre de la Criée
- Best Musical – Le Passe-muraille at the Théâtre Montansier and at the Théâtre des Bouffes-Parisiens
- Best Adaptation of a Foreign Play – Jean Piat for L'Affrontement
- Best Playwright – Arnaud Bédouet for Kinkali
- Best Director – Alain Sachs for Le Passe-muraille
- Best Costumes – Dominique Borg for Le Libertin (The Libertine)
- Best Stage Design/Set – Guy-Claude François for Le Passe-muraille (The Man Who Walked Through Walls)
- Best Comedy – Accalmies passagères (Communicating Doors) by Alan Ayckbourn

=== 1998 ===
Jury presided by Dario Fo. Awards hosted by.

- Best Actor – Michel Bouquet in Les Côtelettes
- Best Supporting Actor – Maurice Barrier in Douze hommes en colère (Twelve Angry Men)
- Best Male Newcomer – Nicolas Vaude in Château en Suède (Château in Sweden) and Michel Vuillermoz in André le Magnifique
- Best Actress – Dominique Blanc in Une maison de poupée (A Doll's House)
- Best Supporting Actress – Geneviève Casile in Bel-Ami (Bel Ami)
- Best Female Newcomer – Isabelle Candelier in André le Magnifique
- Best Show : new play – André le magnifique at the Théâtre Tristan-Bernard
- Best Show : classical play – Les Fourberies de Scapin at the Comédie-Française
- Best Musical – Le Quatuor, il pleut des cordes at the Théâtre du Palais-Royal
- Best Adaptation of a Foreign Play – Attica Guedj and Stéphan Meldegg for Pop-corn (Popcorn)
- Best Playwright – Isabelle Candelier, Loïc Houdre, Patrick Ligardes, Denis Podalydes and Michel Vuillermoz for André le magnifique
- Best Director – Jean-Louis Benoît for Les Fourberies de Scapin
- Best Costumes – Jean-Marc Stehlé for Le Roi cerf
- Best Stage Design/Set – Jean-Marc Stehlé for Le Roi cerf

=== 1999 ===
Jury presided by Pierre Arditi. Awards hosted by.

- Best Actor – Robert Hirsch in Le Bel Air de Londres (London Assurance)
- Best Supporting Actor – Michel Aumont in Rêver peut-être
- Best Male Newcomer – Denis Podalydes in Le Revizor (The Government Inspector)
- Best Actress – Isabelle Carré in Mademoiselle Else
- Best Supporting Actress – Geneviève Fontanel in Délicate Balance
- Best Female Newcomer – Marie-Christine Orry dans L'Atelier (The Workshop)
- Best Show : New Play – Copenhague (Copenhagen) by Michael Frayn at the Théâtre Montparnasse
- Best Show : Classical Play – L'Atelier (The Workshop) at the Théâtre Hébertot
- Best Musical – L'Ultima Récital at the Théâtre Mogador
- Best one man show – Philippe Avron for Je suis un saumon at the Théâtre Rive Gauche
- Best Comedy – Après la pluie at the Théâtre de Poche Montparnasse
- Best Adaptation of a Foreign Play – Jean-Marie Besset for Copenhague (Copenhagen)
- Best Playwright – Jean-Claude Grumberg for L'Atelier (The Workshop)
- Best Director – Gildas Bourdet for L'Atelier (The Workshop)
- Best Costumes – Pascale Bordet for Mademoiselle Else
- Best Stage Design/Set – Jean-Marc Stehlé for Rêver peut-être
- Honorary Molière : Vittorio Gassman and Arthur Miller

=== 2000 ===
Jury presided by Suzanne Flon. Awards hosted by.

- Best Actor – Michel Aumont in Un sujet de roman
- Best Supporting Actor – Marcel Cuvelier in Mon père avait raison
- Best Male Newcomer – Christian Hecq in La Main passe
- Best Actress – Judith Magre in Shirley
- Best Supporting Actress – Dominique Blanchar in Les Femmes savantes
- Best Female Newcomer – Irina Brook for Résonnances
- Best Show : New Play – Tambours sur la digue at the Théâtre du Soleil
- Best Show : Classical Play – Le Révizor (The Government Inspector) at the Comédie-Française
- Best Musical – Peines de coeur d'une chatte française at the MC 93
- Best Comical Play Mort accidentelle d'un anarchiste (Accidental Death of an Anarchist) at the Théâtre La Bruyère
- Best One Man Show – Arturo Brachetti for L'Homme aux mille visages (The Man With a Thousand Faces)
- Best Adaptation of a Foreign Play – Valérie Tasca for Mort accidentelle d'un anarchiste (Accidental Death of an Anarchist)
- Best Playwright – Dario Fo for Mort accidentelle d'un anarchiste (Accidental Death of an Anarchist)
- Best Director – Ariane Mnouchkine for Tambours sur la digue
- Best Costumes – Chloé Obolensky for Peines de coeur d'une chatte française
- Best Stage Design/Set – Guy-Claude François for Tambours sur la digue
- Honorary Molière : Raymond Devos, Hubert Gignoux, Charles Trénet and the Théâtre de la Huchette

=== 2001 ===
Jury presided by Robert Hossein. Awards hosted by.

- Best Actor – Simon Abkarian in Une bête sur la lune (Beast on the Moon)
- Best Supporting Actor – Georges Wilson in Une chatte sur un toit brûlant (Cat on a Hot Tin Roof)
- Best Male Newcomer – Édouard Baer in Cravate Club
- Best Actress – Corinne Jaber in Une bête sur la lune (Beast on the Moon)
- Best Supporting Actress – Annick Alane in Une chatte sur un toit brûlant (Cat on a Hot Tin Roof)
- Best Female Newcomer – Barbara Schulz in Joyeuses Pâques
- Best Show : New Play – : Les Directeurs at the Théâtre de Poche Montparnasse
- Best Show : Classical Play – Une chatte sur un toit brûlant (Cat on a Hot Tin Roof)
- Best Musical – Chantons sous la pluie (Singin' in the Rain) at the Théâtre de la Porte Saint-Martin
- Best Comedy – Ladies Night at the Théâtre Rive Gauche
- Best One-Man Show – Valérie Lemercier at the Folies Bergère
- Best Adaptation of a Foreign Play – Daniel Loayza pour Une bête sur la lune (Beast on the Moon)
- Best Playwright – Daniel Besse pour Les Directeurs
- Best Director – Irina Brook pour Une bête sur la lune (Beast on the Moon)
- Best Costume Design – Ezio Toffolutti pour Le Cercle de craie caucasien (The Caucasian Chalk Circle)
- Best Stage Design/Set – Ezio Toffolutti pour Le Cercle de craie caucasien (The Caucasian Chalk Circle)
- Best Lighting Design – André Diot for Le Cercle de craie caucasien (The Caucasian Chalk Circle)
- Honorary Molière – Madeleine Robinson

=== 2002 ===
Jury presided by Jean Piat. Awards hosted by.

- Best Actor – Jean-Paul Roussillon in Le Jardin des apparences
- Best Supporting Actor – Maurice Chevit in Conversations avec mon père (Conversations with my Father)
- Best Male Newcomer – Eric Elmosnino in Léonce et Léna
- Best Actress – Annie Girardot in Madame Marguerite
- Best Supporting Actress – Annie Gregorio in Théâtre sans animaux
- Best Female Newcomer – Rachida Brakni in Ruy Blas
- Best Show – New play – La Boutique au coin de la rue (The Shop Around the Corner) at the Théâtre Montparnasse
- Best Show – Classical play – Bent at the Théâtre de l'Œuvre
- Best Comedy – Théâtre sans animaux at the Théâtre Tristan-Bernard
- Best One Man Show – Philippe Avron in Le Fantôme de Shakespeare
- Best Musical – Frou-Frou les Bains at the Théâtre Daunou
- Best Adaptation of a Foreign Play – Evelyne Fallot and Jean-Jacques Zilbermann for La Boutique au coin de la rue (The Shop Around the Corner)
- Best Playwright – Jean-Michel Ribes for Théâtre sans animaux
- Best Director – Jean-Jacques Zilbermann for La Boutique au coin de la rue (The Shop Around the Corner)
- Best Costumes – Pascale Bordet for Le Dindon (Sauce for the Goose)
- Best Lighting Design – Jacques Rouveyrollis pour La Boutique au coin de la rue (The Shop Around the Corner)
- Best Stage Design/Set – Stéfanie Jarre for La Boutique au coin de la rue (The Shop Around the Corner)
- Honorary Molière – Annie Girardot, Simone Valère and Jean Desailly

=== 2003 ===
Jury presided by Jean Piat. Awards hosted by Jean Piat.

- Best Actor – Thierry Fortineau in Gros-Câlin
- Best Supporting Actor – Michel Duchaussoy in Phèdre
- Best Male Newcomer – Marc Fayet in Un petit jeu sans conséquence
- Best Actress – Danielle Darrieux in Oscar et la dame rose (Oscar and the Lady in Pink)
- Best Supporting Actress – Annie Sinigalia in Poste restante (A Song at Twilight)
- Best Female Newcomer – Valérie Karsenty in Un petit jeu sans conséquence
- Best Show in an Independent theatre – Un petit jeu sans conséquence at the Théâtre La Bruyère
- Best Show in a National theatre – Phèdre at the Théâtre de l'Odéon-Ateliers Berthier
- Best French New Play – Un petit jeu sans conséquence at the Théâtre La Bruyère
- Best Musical – Le Quatuor, sur la corde rêve
- Best One Man Show – Shirley et Dino for Shirley & Dino – Le duo
- Best Adaptation of a Foreign Play – Pascale de Boysson for Le Regard at the Théâtre Rive Gauche
- Best Playwright – Victor Haïm for Jeux de scène
- Best Director – Stéphane Hillel for Un petit jeu sans conséquence
- Best Costumes – Christian Gasc for L'Éventail de Lady Windermere (Lady Windermere's Fan)
- Best Stage Design/Set – Gérard Stehlé for L'Enfant do
- Best Lighting Design – Dominique Brugière for Phèdre
- Honorary Molière – Gisèle Casadesus

=== 2004 ===
Jury presided by. Awards hosted by.

- Best Actor – Dominique Pinon in L'Hiver sous la table
- Best Supporting Actor – Thierry Frémont in Signé Dumas
- Best Male Newcomer – Xavier Gallais in Roberto Zucco
- Best Actress – Isabelle Carré in L'Hiver sous la table
- Best Supporting Actress – Martine Sarcey in L'Inscription
- Best Female Newcomer – Marie Vincent in ...Comme en 14 !
- Best Show in an Independent theatre – L'Hiver sous la table at the Théâtre de l'Atelier
- Best Show in a National theatre – ...Comme en 14 ! at the Théâtre 13/Pépinière Opéra
- Best French New Play – ...Comme en 14 ! at the Théâtre 13/Pépinière Opéra
- Best Comedy – L'Amour est enfant de salaud (Things We Do for Love) by Alan Ayckbourn at the Théâtre Tristan-Bernard
- Best Adaptation of a Foreign Play – Michel Blanc for L'Amour est enfant de salaud (Things We Do For Love)
- Best Playwright – Denise Bonal for Portrait de famille
- Best Director – Zabou Breitman for L'Hiver sous la table
- Best Costumes – Moidele Bickel for Les Fables de la Fontaine
- Best Stage Design/Set – Jacques Gabel for L'Hiver sous la table
- Best Lighting Design – André Diot for L'Hiver sous la table

=== 2005 ===
Jury presided by. Awards hosted by Laurent Ruquier and William Leymergie.

- Best Actor – Michel Bouquet in Le roi se meurt (Exit the King)
- Best Supporting Actor – Maurice Chevit in Brooklyn Boy
- Best Male Newcomer – Micha Lescot in Musée haut, musée bas
- Best Actress – Christine Murillo in Dis à ma fille que je pars en voyage
- Best Supporting Actress – Norah Krief in Hedda Gabler
- Best Female Newcomer – Emmanuelle Bougerol in Les Muses orphelines
- Best Show in an Independent theatre – Le roi se meurt (Exit the King) at the Théâtre Hébertot
- Best Show in a National theatre – Le Dernier Caravansérail at the Théâtre du Soleil
- Best Music – Jean-Jacques Lemètre for Le Dernier Caravansérail
- Best Adaptation of a Foreign Play – Séverine Magois and Didier Bezace for La Version de Browning (The Browning Version)
- Best Playwright – Wajdi Mouawad pour Littoral
- Best Director – Didier Bezace for La Version de Browning (The Browning Version)
- Best Costumes – Alain Chambon for Le Menteur (The Liar)
- Best Stage Design/Set – Serge Nicolaï, Duccio Bellugi-Vannuccini and Guy-Claude François for Le Dernier Caravansérail
- Best Lighting Design – André Diot for Le Jugement dernier

=== 2006 ===
Jury presided by Jacques Weber. Awards hosted by Karine Le Marchand.

- Best Actor – Jacques Sereys in Du côté de chez Proust
- Best Supporting Actor – Roger Dumas Moins 2
- Best Male Newcomer – James Thiérrée in La Symphonie du hanneton (The Junebug Symphony)
- Best Actress – Judith Magre in Histoires d'hommes
- Best Supporting Actress – Danièle Lebrun in Pygmalion
- Best Female Newcomer – Marilou Berry in Toc Toc
- Best Show in an Independent theatre – Moi aussi, je suis Catherine Deneuve at the Pépinière Opéra
- Best Show in a National theatre – La Symphonie du hanneton (The Junebug Symphony) at the Théâtre du Rond-Point
- Best Musical – Le Jazz et la Diva at the Théâtre Tristan-Bernard
- Best Adaptation of a Foreign Play – André Markowicz and Françoise Morvan for Platonov
- Best Playwright – Stéphan Wojtowicz for La Sainte Catherine
- Best Director – James Thiérrée for La Symphonie du hanneton (The Junebug Symphony)
- Best Costumes – Victoria Chaplin Thiérrée for La Symphonie du hanneton
- Best Stage Design/Set – Nicky Rieti for Le Roi Lear (King Lear)
- Best Lighting Design – André Diot for Le Roi Lear (King Lear)

=== 2007 ===
Jury presided by Jacques Weber. Awards hosted by Karine Le Marchand.

- Best Actor – Robert Hirsch in Le Gardien (The Caretaker)
- Best Supporting Actor – Éric Ruf in Cyrano de Bergerac
- Best Male Newcomer – Julien Cottereau in Imagine-toi
- Best Actress – Martine Chevallier in Le Retour au désert (Return to the Desert)
- Best Supporting Actress – Catherine Hiegel in Le Retour au désert (Return to the Desert)
- Best Female Newcomer – Sara Giraudeau in La Valse des pingouins
- Best Show in an Independent theatre – Le Gardien (The Caretaker) at the Théâtre de l'Œuvre
- Best Show in a National theatre – Cyrano de Bergerac at the Comédie-Française
- Best Musical – Le Cabaret des hommes perdus at the Théâtre du Rond-Point and at the Pépinière Opéra
- Best One Man Show – Michel Aumont in À la porte
- Best Adaptation of a Foreign Play – Marcel Bluwal for À la porte
- Best Playwright – Christian Siméon for Le Cabaret des hommes perdus
- Best Director – Denis Podalydès for Cyrano de Bergerac
- Best Costumes – Christian Lacroix for Cyrano de Bergerac
- Best Stage Design/Set – Éric Ruf for Cyrano de Bergerac
- Best Lighting Design – Stéphanie Daniel for Cyrano de Bergerac

=== 2008 ===
Jury presided by Clovis Cornillac and Barbara Schulz Awards hosted by Karine Le Marchand

- Best Actor – Michel Galabru in Les Chaussettes – opus 124
- Best Supporting Actor – Gilles Privat in L'Hôtel du libre échange
- Best Actress – Myriam Boyer in La Vie devant soi
- Best Supporting Actress – Valérie Bonneton in Le Dieu du carnage
- Best Newcomer – Raphaëline Goupilleau in Une souris verte
- Best Show in an Independent theatre – La Vie devant soi at the Théâtre Marigny
- Best Show in a National theatre – Juste la fin du monde at the Comédie-Française
- Best Musical – Le Roi Lion (The Lion King)
- Best Adaptation – Xavier Jaillard for La Vie devant soi
- Best Playwright – Roland Dubillard for Les Diablogues
- Best Director – John Malkovich for Good Canary
- Best Costumes – Julie Taymor Le Roi Lion (The Lion King)
- Best Stage Design/Set – Pierre-Francois Limbosch pour Good Canary

=== 2009 ===
Jury presided by Bernard Giraudeau Awards hosted by Frédéric Mitterrand

- Best Actor – Patrick Chesnais in Cochons d'Inde
- Best Supporting Actor – Roland Bertin in Coriolan
- Best Male Newcomer – David Lescot in La Commission centrale de l'enfance
- Best Actress – Anne Alvaro in Gertrude (le cri) (Gertrude (The Cry))
- Best Supporting Actress – Monique Chaumette in Baby Doll
- Best Female Newcomer – Aude Briant in Le Journal à quatre mains
- Best Show in an Independent theatre – Des Gens at the Théâtre Montparnasse
- Best Show in a National theatre – Coriolan at the Théâtre national populaire
- Best Musical – L'Opéra de Sarah – avant l'Amérique at the Théâtre de l'Œuvre
- Best Adaptation of a Foreign Play – Zabou Breitman for Des gens
- Best Playwright – Jean-Claude Grumberg for Vers toi terre promise
- Best Director – Christian Schiaretti for Coriolan
- Best Costumes – Claire Risterucci for Madame de Sade
- Best Stage Design/Set – Catherine Bluwal for Le Diable rouge

=== 2010 ===
Jury presided by Line Renaud Awards hosted by Michel Drucker and Marie Drucker

- Best Actor – Laurent Terzieff in L'Habilleur (The Dresser) and Philoctète (Philoctetes)
- Best Supporting Actor – Henri Courseaux in La Nuit des rois (Twelfth Night)
- Best Male Newcomer – Guillaume Gallienne in Les garçons et Guillaume, à table !
- Best Actress – Dominique Blanc in La Douleur
- Best Supporting Actress – Claire Nadeau in La Serva amorosa (The Loving Maid)
- Best Female Newcomer – Alice Belaïdi in Confidences à Allah
- Best Show in an Independent theatre – L'Habilleur (The Dresser) at the Théâtre Rive Gauche
- Best Show in a National theatre – Les Naufragés du fol espoir at the Théâtre du Soleil
- Best Show for Young People – Oh Boy! at the Théâtre du Phare
- Best Musical – Les Douze Pianos d'Hercule by the Compagnie des Claviers
- Best Comedy – Les 39 marches at the Théâtre La Bruyère
- Best Adaptation of a Foreign Play – Gérald Sibleyras for Les 39 marches (The 39 Steps)
- Best Playwright – Éric Assous for L'Illusion conjugale
- Best Director – Alain Françon for La Cerisaie (The Cherry Orchard)
- Best Costumes – Nathalie Thomas, Marie-Hélène Bouvet, Annie Tran for Les Naufragés du Fol Espoir
- Best Stage Design/Set – Catherine Bluwal for La Serva amorosa (The Loving Maid)
- Best Lighting Design – Gaëlle de Malglaive for La Nuit des rois (Twelfth Night)

=== 2011 ===
Jury presided by Michel Galabru. Awards hosted by Laurent Lafitte

- Best Actor – Christian Hecq in Un fil à la patte (A Fly in the Ointment)
- Best Supporting Actor – Guillaume Gallienne in Un fil à la patte (A Fly in the Ointment)
- Best Male Newcomer – Guillaume Marquet in Le Dindon (Sauce for the Goose)
- Best Actress – Catherine Hiegel in La Mère
- Best Supporting Actress – Bulle Ogier in Rêve d'automne (Autumn Dream)
- Best Female Newcomer – Georgia Scalliet in Les Trois Sœurs (Three Sisters)
- Best Show in an Independent theatre – Le Repas des fauves at the Théâtre Michel
- Best Show in a National theatre – Un fil à la patte (A Fly in the Ointment) at the Comédie-Française
- Best Musical – Une flûte enchantée at the Théâtre des Bouffes du Nord
- Best Comedy – Thé à la menthe ou t'es citron at the Théâtre Fontaine
- Best Adaptation – Julien Sibre for Le Repas des fauves
- Best Playwright – Joël Pommerat for Ma chambre froide
- Best Director – Julien Sibre for Le Repas des fauves
- Best Costumes – Jean-Daniel Vuillermoz for Henri IV, le bien aimé
- Best Stage Design/Set – Richard Peduzzi for Rêve d'automne (Autumn Dream)
- Best Lighting Design – Dominique Bruguière pour Rêve d'automne (Autumn Dream)
- Honorary Molière – Peter Brook

=== 2016 ===
- Best Show in a Public Theatre: Ça ira (1) Fin de Louis, directed by Joël Pommerat, Théâtre Nanterre-Amandiers
- Best Show in a Private Theatre: Les Cavaliers, after Joseph Kessel, directed by Eric Bouvron and Anne Bourgeois, Théâtre La Bruyère
- Best Actor in a Public Theatre: Charles Berling in Vu du Pont (A View from the Bridge) by Arthur Miller, directed by Ivo Van Hove
- Best Actor in a Private Theatre: Wladimir Yordanoff in Who's Afraid of Virginia Woolf? by Edward Albee, directed by Alain Françon
- Best Actress in a Public Theatre: Dominique Blanc in Les Liaisons Dangereuses by Pierre Choderlos de Laclos, directed by Christine Letailleur
- Best Actress in a Private Theatre: Catherine Frot in Fleur de Cactus by Pierre Barillet and Jean-Pierre Gredy, directed by Michel Fau
- Best Supporting Actor: Didier Brice in A tort et à raison (Taking Sides) by Ronald Harwood, directed by Georges Werler
- Best Supporting Actress: Anne Bouvier in King Lear by William Shakespeare, directed by Jean-Luc Revol
- Best Male Newcomer: Alexis Moncorgé in Amok by Stefan Zweig, directed by Caroline Darnay
- Best Female Newcomer: Géraldine Martineau in Le poisson Belge by Léonore Confino, directed by Catherine Schaub
- Best Musical: Les Fiancés de Loches by Georges Feydeau and Maurice Desvallières, directed by Hervé Devolder, Théâtre du Palais-Royal
- Best Comedy: Les Faux British (The Play That Goes Wrong) by Henry Lewis, Jonathan Sayer and Henry Shields, directed by Gwen Aduh, Théâtre Tristan Bernard
- Best Show for Young Audiences: Pinocchio, adapted and directed by Joël Pommerat, Théâtre de l'Odéon
- Best Solo Show: Les Chatouilles ou la danse de la colère, by Andréa Bescond, directed by Éric Métayer
- Best Living Francophone Playwright: Joël Pommerat for Ça ira (1) Fin de Louis
- Best Director in a Public Theatre: Joël Pommerat for Ça ira (1) Fin de Louis by Joël Pommerat
- Best Director in a Private Theatre: Alain Françon for Who's Afraid of Virginia Woolf? by Edward Albee
- Best Humour: Alex Lutz, Alex Lutz and Tom Dingler, directed by Tom Dingler
- Best Visual Creation: 20 000 lieues sous les mers (20,000 leagues under the sea), after Jules Verne, directed by Christian Hecq and Valérie Lesort, Theater of the Vieux-Colombier. Scenography and costumes: Eric Ruf. Lights: Pascal Laajili. Puppets: Carole German and Valérie Lesort

=== 2025 ===
- Best Show in a Public Theatre: Le Soulier de satin directed by Éric Ruf, Comédie-Française
- Best Show in a Private Theatre: Coal in the Veins, directed by Jean-Philippe Daguerre, Théâtre Saint Georges
- Best Actor in a Public Theatre: Denis Lavant in Fin de Partie by Samuel Beckett, directed by Jacques Osinski
- Best Actor in a Private Theatre: Guillaume Bouchède in Les Marchands d'Étoiles by Anthony Michineau, directed by Julien Alluguette
- Best Actress in a Public Theatre: Marina Hands in Le Soulier de Satin by Paul Claudel, directed by Éric Ruf
- Best Actress in a Private Theatre: Catherine Frot in Fleur de Cactus by Pierre Barillet and Jean-Pierre Gredy, directed by Michel Fau
- Best Supporting Actor: Delphine Depardieu in Les Liaisons dangereuses (Dangerous Liaisons) by Pierre Choderlos de Laclos, directed by Arnaud Denis
- Best Supporting Actress: Raphaëlle Cambray in Du charbon dans les veines by Jean-Philippe Daguerre, directed by Jean-Philippe Daguerre
- Best Male Newcomer: Vassili Schneider in La prochaine fois que tu mordras la poussière by Panayotis Pascot, directed by Paul Pascot
- Best Female Newcomer: Juliette Behár in Du charbon dans les veines by Jean-Philippe Daguerre, directed by Jean-Philippe Daguerre
- Best Musical: Les Misérables by Alain Boublil and Claude-Michel Schönberg, directed by Ladislas Chollat, Théâtre du Châtelet
- Best Comedy: Paul Mirabel in Par Amour by Paul Mirabel, directed by Paul Mirabel
- Best Show for Young Audiences: Ulysse, l'Odyssée musicale, by Ely Grimaldi and Igor de Chaillé, directed by Guillaume Bouchède, Théâtre des Variétés
- Best Solo Show: Pauline & Carton with Christine Murillo by Charles Tordjman, Christine Murillo and Virginie Berling, directed by Charles Tordjman, La Scala Paris and Artistic Athévains
- Best Living Francophone Playwright: Jean-Philippe Daguerre for Coal in the Veins
- Best Director in a Public Theatre: Eric Ruf for The Satin Slipper by Paul Claudel
- Best Director in a Private Theatre: Jean-Philippe Daguerre for Coal in the Veins
- Best Humour: The Loop by Robin Goupil, directed by Robin Goupil, Théâtre des Béliers parisiens
- Best Visual Creation:Le Soulier de satin by Paul Claudel

Costumes: Christian Lacroix. Lights:Bertrand Couderc
