= Four Nights of a Dreamer =

1971 romantic comedy-drama film by Robert Bresson

- French: Quatre nuits d'un rêveur
- Directed by: Robert Bresson
- Written by: Robert Bresson
- Based on: "White Nights" (1848 short story) by Fyodor Dostoyevsky
- Produced by: Gian Vittorio Baldi
- Starring: Isabelle Weingarten; Guillaume des Forêts
- Cinematography: Pierre Lhomme
- Edited by: Raymond Lamy
- Music by: F. R. David; Louis Guitar; Christopher Hayward; Michel Magne
- Production companies: Albina Productions; I Film Dell'Orso; Victoria Film; ORTF
- Release dates: 13 May 1971 (Cannes); 2 February 1972 (France); 1 November 1979 (Italy)
- Running time: 87 minutes
- Countries: France; Italy
- Language: French
- Box office: $72,057

Four Nights of a Dreamer (French: Quatre nuits d'un rêveur) is a 1971 romantic comedy-drama film written and directed by Robert Bresson. The film stars Isabelle Weingarten, in her feature film debut, and Guillaume des Forêts. A loose adaptation of Fyodor Dostoyevsky's short story "White Nights," the film tells the story of a down-on-his-luck artist (des Forêts) who attempts to prevent a heartbroken woman (Weingarten) from committing suicide by spending four consecutive evenings with her on the streets of Paris.

On release, Four Nights of a Dreamer was praised for its cinematography and romantic sensuality. Today, it is one of Bresson's lesser known films, in part due to complexities regarding the distribution rights. Despite (or perhaps because of) its unusually light tone for a late-style Bresson film, it has been described as one of Bresson's most underrated films. A 4K restoration was released in 2024.

== Plot ==
Jacques, a depressed and alienated Parisian artist, attempts to hitchhike a ride to nowhere in particular. He spends the day in the countryside, where his whimsical whistling annoys the locals.

During an evening stroll in Paris, Jacques sees a woman named Marthe pondering suicide while sitting on the edge of the Pont Neuf. Jacques convinces her to walk away. At the end of the night, they promise to meet each other at the Pont Neuf the following evening; this repeats over the course of four nights, giving rise to the film's title.

=== Flashbacks ===
To distract Marthe in the evenings, Jacques agrees to swap stories with her about their lives. Two extended flashbacks show that Jacques and Marthe are both disillusioned with their lives.

Although Jacques is an alumnus of an elite École des Beaux-Arts, he lives alone in a desolate little flat that doubles as his studio. He is constantly entranced by women he meets on the streets of Paris, but cannot bring himself to ask any of them out. He uses a tape recorder to tell fanciful love stories, which he plays back to inspire his artistic process. A classmate unexpectedly visits him, but while Jacques wants to impress him and is worried that the classmate will not respect his paintings, he is alienated by the classmate's philosophically-dense analysis of art.

Marthe lives in a flat with her divorced mother and a series of tenants. One of the tenants (a male graduate student who is never named) tries to trap Marthe in the elevator to get her to go watch a movie with him, but Marthe rejects him. In retaliation, the tenant gives Marthe free tickets to a low-quality Hollywood-style action movie. Marthe dislikes the movie, but learns from the experience that she and the tenant have similar tastes in cinema. One night, Marthe and the tenant realize a mutual attraction, but cannot bring themselves to proposition the other. They eventually become lovers, but soon after, the tenant earns a scholarship to study at Yale for a year. The lovers promise to be faithful to one another and to reunite at year's-end.

=== Return to present ===
Marthe tells Jacques that she is contemplating suicide because her lover returned to Paris three days ago and has made no attempt to contact her. Jacques comforts her and suggests that she send her lover a letter asking whether he still loves her. Marthe agrees, but cannot bring herself to confront him directly. Instead, Jacques and some mutual friends agree to transmit letters between the two.

The Parisian nights are filled with music, accentuating the romantic side of Jacques' personality. One night, Jacques and Marthe share an emotionally intimate moment watching a Brazilian band entertaining customers on the Bateaux Mouches. Jacques realizes that he has a crush on Marthe. During the days, he sees Marthe's name wherever he goes, including a shop window and the name of a boat. His tape-recorded messages shift from abstract love stories to his interest in Marthe, and grow increasingly erotic in nature. During the nights, Marthe compounds Jacques' frustration by telling him that she is grateful that Jacques has stood by her even though she is not sexually interested in him.

The lover never writes back to Marthe. After Jacques tells Marthe that he loves her, she attempts to start a relationship with him. (Jacques physically resembles the graduate student.) They buy drinks and sit down to chat, but to Jacques' dismay, although Marthe tries to convince herself that she loves Jacques, she cannot shake her feelings for her old lover. Various moments hint that Jacques and Marthe are not on the same emotional wavelength. However, when Jacques begins to walk away from Marthe, she professes her love for him. Jacques assents, and the couple begin walking down the street, arm in arm.

Suddenly, Marthe and Jacques run into Marthe's former lover. Marthe is unsure how to handle the situation. She runs to her lover and kisses him. Then she runs back to Jacques and kisses him for longer. Then she runs back to her lover, and they walk off together without a word.

The following day, Jacques resumes painting in his flat. His new tape recording fantasizes about Marthe asking him to take her back.

== Cast ==
- Isabelle Weingarten as Marthe
- Guillaume des Forêts as Jacques
- Maurice Monnoyer as Marthe's lover
- Lidia Biondi as Marthe's mother
- Patrick Jouanné as Gangster (in the film within a film)
- Jérôme Massart as Jacques' art school friend

== Production ==
=== Screenplay ===
The film is based on Fyodor Dostoyevsky's short story White Nights. However, Bresson saw the film as "a far cry from being a mere adaptation" of Dostoyevsky's short story. He was drawn to the idea of characters falling in love with people they do not know and cannot see, while rejecting the love of people they can see.

In an interview promoting the film, Bresson noted that he was willing to adapt White Nights because he felt the underlying short story was "pretty flawed" in comparison to Dostoyevsky's best novels, the latter of which were unsuitable for adaptation because of their "formal perfection" as literature.

=== Casting ===
In keeping with Bresson's practice, he hired mostly amateur actors. For this film, he looked for individuals with "a literary or university background;" Isabelle Weingarten's father was playwright Romain Weingarten, and Guillaume des Forêts' father was author Louis-René des Forêts. The only professional actor in the film is the Italian Lidia Biondi.

Although Weingarten had never acted in a feature film before, she eventually became a full-time actor; she was particularly active in the 1970s and 1980s. Other temporarily "amateur" actors who parlayed Bresson debuts into full-time film careers include Claude Laydu (Diary of a Country Priest), Martin LaSalle (Pickpocket), Marika Green (Pickpocket), Anne Wiazemsky (Au hasard Balthazar), and Dominique Sanda (Une femme douce).

In addition, Claire Denis and Jonathan Rosenbaum appear as extras. Denis' time on set reportedly led to her first paying job in the film industry, serving as second assistant director on Dušan Makavejev's Sweet Movie. Rosenbaum admitted that he was somewhat confused by Bresson's directorial style, explaining that "he seemed more isolated from his crew than any other filmmaker I’ve seen at work; his widow and onetime assistant director, Mylene van der Mersch, often conveyed his instructions."

== Distribution ==
=== Distribution rights issues ===
Historically, Four Nights of a Dreamer was notoriously difficult to view outside of the film festival and revival circuits. To promote a 2012 Bresson retrospective, the Toronto International Film Festival wrote that Four Nights of a Dreamer is "certainly the rarest of Bresson's films." Turner Classic Movies' Jeff Stafford wrote that the film is "difficult to see in any format."

In 2013, the film received a Blu-ray release in Japan, with no English subtitles. In 2022, the distributors made the film available to stream for free for two weeks, prompting Richard Brody to note that the film had been "long unavailable," at least in the United States.

Following the film's 2024 restoration (see below), the film made its commercial streaming debut on the Criterion Channel in March 2026.

=== 2024 restoration ===
In 2024, Marin Karmitz's mk2 Films announced that it would release a 4K restoration of the film, under the supervision of Mylene Bresson. The film was the last Bresson film to receive a restoration.

Janus Films (which operates The Criterion Collection) secured the rights to distribute the restoration in the United States. The completed restoration was shown at the Cannes Film Festival and the New York Film Festival.

== Reception ==
=== Critical reception ===
Four Nights of a Dreamer received positive reviews upon release. The New York Times' Roger Greenspun praised the film's "balletic purity" and said that while the film may not have been "Bresson's greatest movie, [] it may well be his loveliest. ... I can think of nothing in recent films so ravishing as his strange romantic vision of the city, the river, the softly lighted tourist boats in the night." Claude Mauriac praised the film's cinematography, saying it was "Bresson's most gorgeous work. ... This is a film in color: the colors of the night."

Despite its relative obscurity, the film has continued to receive critical praise since its release. Screen Slate's Chris Shields described Four Nights of a Dreamer as one of Bresson's more approachable works. He praised the film for its "sequences of pure visual comedy that would have been at home in the silent era," while adding that "the director himself appears caught up in the euphoria of young love, filling his film with music and painting." The Chicago Reader's Dave Kehr called the film "very beautiful and essential," writing that "the transformation of Paris at night into a dream landscape pulsing with electric mystery is reminiscent of [Vincente] Minnelli, although the economy of expression is clearly Bresson’s." Writing for the British Film Institute, filmmaker Alex Barrett said that Four Nights of a Dreamer "may well be Bresson’s most tender and emotionally involving film."

In advance of the film's 2024 re-release, mk2 films (which funded the re-release) collected blurbs from Jia Zhangke, Sergei Loznitsa, and Wim Wenders praising the film. Wenders called the film "totally timeless," adding that the film "dissects how 'music' and 'story' belong together." Paul Schrader introduced the re-release at the 2024 Cannes Film Festival, explaining that Four Nights of a Dreamer exemplifies Bresson's shift from "the filmmaker of the lonely man" to a director who also told interesting stories about women. He added that he was "shocked" by the quality of the colors in the restoration, as he had previously believed that Bresson's black-and-white films were more visually impressive than his color films.

On the review aggregator website Rotten Tomatoes, 90% of 10 critics' reviews are positive, with an average rating of 8.4/10.

=== Accolades ===
Four Nights of a Dreamer was screened in competition at the 21st Berlin International Film Festival and the London Film Festival. At Berlin, the film received the OCIC Award (given by a Catholic film organization, despite the film's seeming lack of religious content) but lost the Golden Bear to The Garden of the Finzi-Continis. At London, the film received the Sutherland Trophy for originality. (The British Film Institute did not award a Best Film award at the London festival until the 21st century.)

== Analysis ==
Today, Four Nights of a Dreamer is one of Bresson's lesser-known works. The New York Film Festival said that it was "perhaps Bresson's most underrated film."

Critics have noted that Four Nights of a Dreamer is somewhat of an outlier within Bresson's oeuvre. It deviates from the traditional Bresson framework of "characters attaining beatific grace through suffering," and its emotional tenderness and sensuality represent "a break from the darkening mood of Bresson's previous work, before [his] last three films' respective descents into Hell." The British Film Institute quipped that the film was "one of the director's warmest pictures (not a closely fought competition, admittedly)." Dave Kehr also noted that unlike several better-known Bresson films, Four Nights of a Dreamer contains no religious content. However, when promoting the film, Bresson stressed the film's tragic ending and its consistency with his trademark minimalist style.
