= Pascale de Boysson =

French actress

- Occupation: Actress

Pascale de Boysson (16 April 1922 – 9 August 2002) was a French film, television and stage actress who also adapted and translated plays for the French stage. She was a two-time winner of the Molière Award, winning it in 1988 and posthumously in 2003.

== Biography ==
Born as Marie Thérèse Antoinette Pascale de Boysson in April 1922 at Château de Châtillon in the commune of Chindrieux, she was one of ten children born to the aristocratic Louis de Boysson (1881-1971), a Director of the Paris Railroad Company in Orléans who married Marie Jeanne d'Anglejan-Châtillon in 1912. She was a pupil of Charles Dullin and Tania Balachova. In 1961 after meeting Laurent Terzieff she became his life partner and led the company Terzieff founded in 1961. She starred in more than fifty plays and the show Le Babil des classes dangereuses, which she helped to create in January 1984.

She adapted works by Murray Schisgal, Arnold Wesker and Sławomir Mrożek and in 2003 she posthumously received a Molière Award as the best adapter of a foreign work for Le Regard by Murray Schisgal. She also appeared in more than thirty films or TV movies, and lent her voice to the film L'Histoire sans fin, the French-language version of The NeverEnding Story. Her film roles include Gasparine in Lovers of Paris (1957), the bar owner in Seven Days... Seven Nights (1960), Sister Cécile in Dialogue of the Carmelites (1960), La servante des Boule in Amelie or The Time to Love (1961), Elisabeth Lapeyre in Les Abysses (1963), Simone in The Shameless Old Lady (1965), Blanche in Le Maître de pension (1973), Véronique in Il n'y a pas de fumée sans feu (1973) and Mrs Clare in Tess (1979).

She died aged 80 on 9 August 2002 in La Noue and was buried at Coux-et-Bigaroque in the Dordogne.

== Legacy ==
The Molière Award was awarded to Pascale de Boysson a few months after her death, with Laurent Terzieff thanking the profession and paying tribute to Pascale.

On 2 July 2015 the place Laurent-Terzieff-and-Pascale-of-Boysson was inaugurated in Paris, in the 6th district.

== Filmography ==
=== Cinema ===
- 1957 : Pot-Bouille
- 1960 : Moderato cantabile
- 1960 : Dialogue of the Carmelites
- 1961 : Amelie or The Time to Love
- 1962 : Yannick Bellon's Marriage Office
- 1963 : All Who Fall
- 1963 : Les Abysses
- 1964 : The Adage
- 1964 : Widows
- 1965 : The Shameless Old Lady
- 1966 : The Second Twin
- 1970 : Madly
- 1973 : Il n'y a pas de fumée sans feu
- 1973 : Le Maître de pension
- 1975 : Aloïse
- 1978 : Perceval le Gallois
- 1979 : Tess by Roman Polanski
- 1982 : Little Joseph
- 1985 : The Ragazza dei lilla
- 1992 : The Guéla
- 1994 : The Raft of the Medusa
- 2003 : Rien, voilà l'ordre

== Television ==
- 1963 : The camera explores the time: The Truth on Stellio Lorenzi's Lyon mail case
- 1964 : The camera explores the weather: Mata-Hari by Guy Lessertisseur
- 1967 : Hedda Gabler
- 1973 : The Pension Master
- 1974 : Yellow grassy waves
- 1974 : The Birds of the Moon
- 1975 : Bérénice de Racine
- 1976 : Milady after Paul Morand, directed by François Leterrier
- 1978 : The Rope on Marcel Moussy's Neck
- 1981 : The Journey of the Dutchman
- 1983 : The Arrow in the Heart (La freccia nel fianco)
- 1986 : Nazi Hunter: The Beate Klarsfeld Story
- 1988 : A Doctor of Lights
- 1988 : The Last Five Minutes: Gilles Katz's Last Grand Prize
- 1992 : Liebesreise
- 1996 : Laurent Terzieff, the secret documentary man by Léon Desclozeaux
- 1997 : Baldi: Baldi and the Rich Little Ones by Claude of Anna and Michel Mees

== Theatre ==
=== Actress ===
- 1952 : The Shoemaker's Prodigious Wife by Federico García Lorca, directed by Raymond Hermantier, Theater of Humor
- 1954 : The Morning of a Man of Letters by Tania Balachova after Anton Chekhov, directed by Tania Balachova, Théâtre de la Huchette
- 1954 : Yerma by Federico García Lorca, directed by Guy Suarès, Théâtre de la Huchette
- 1955 : The Seagull by Anton Chekhov, directed by André Barsacq, Théâtre de l'Atelier
- 1955 : The Moon Birds by Marcel Aymé, directed by André Barsacq, Théâtre de l'Atelier
- 1956 : Hedda Gabler by Henrik Ibsen, directed by Guy Suarès, Franklin Theater
- 1958 : Miguel Mañana by Oscar Milosz, directed by Maurice Jacquemont, Studio des Champs-Élysées
- 1958 : When Five Years Pass by Federico García Lorca, directed by Guy Suarès, Théâtre Récamier
- 1959 : L'Échange by Paul Claudel, directed by Guy Suarès, Aix-en-Provence
- 1961 : The Thought, after Leonid Andreyev, adaptation Carlos Semprun, directed by Laurent Terzieff, Théâtre de Lutèce and Théâtre Hébertot (1962)
- 1961 : Les Nourrices by Romain Weingarten, directed by the author, Théâtre de Lutèce
- 1962 : L'Échange by Paul Claudel, directed by Guy Suarès, Théâtre Hébertot
- 1963 : The Tiger by Murray Schisgal, directed by Maurice Garrel and Laurent Terzieff, Théâtre de Lutèce
- 1963 : The Typists by Murray Schisgal, directed by Maurice Garrel and Laurent Terzieff, Théâtre de Lutèce
- 1965 : Love by Murray Schisgal, directed by Maurice Garrel, Théâtre Montparnasse
- 1966 : The Neighbours by James Saunders, directed by Laurent Terzieff, Théâtre de Lutèce
- 1967 : The Neighbours by James Saunders, directed by Laurent Terzieff, Théâtre de Lutèce
- 1967 : Tango by Sławomir Mrożek, adaptation Georges Lisowski and Claude Roy, directed by Laurent Terzieff, Théâtre de Lutèce
- 1968 : Child's Play by Carol Bernstein, directed Laurent Terzieff, Odéon-Théâtre de l'Europe
- 1968 : The Neighbours by James Saunders, directed by Laurent Terzieff, Théâtre du Vieux-Colombier
- 1968 : Fragments and The Chinese by Murray Schisgal, directed by Laurent Terzieff, Théâtre du Vieux-Colombier
- 1969 : The Waltz of the Dogs by Leonid Andreyev, adaptation Laurent Terzieff, directed by Carlos Wittig, Théâtre du Vieux-Colombier
- 1969 : David, the Night Falls by Bernard Kops, directed Yves Gasc, Comedy of the West
- 1971 : The Sleeping Man by Carlos Semprún, directed by Laurent Terzieff, Théâtre du Lucernaire
- 1971 : Here ... Now by Claude Mauriac, directed by Laurent Terzieff, Théâtre du Lucernaire
- 1971 : The Neighbours by James Saunders, directed by Laurent Terzieff, tour
- 1972 : The Stork by Armand Gatti, directed by Pierre Debauche, Théâtre Nanterre-Amandiers
- 1972 : David, the Night Falls by Bernard Kops, directed André Barsacq, Theatre Workshop
- 1973 : Isma, ou ce qui s’appelle rien by Nathalie Sarraute, directed by Claude Régy, Espace Pierre Cardin
- 1973 : Rubezahl, scenes of Don Juan by Oscar Milosz, directed by Laurent Terzieff, Théâtre du Lucernaire
- 1974 : Rubezahl, scenes of Don Juan by Oscar Milosz, directed by Laurent Terzieff, Théâtre Montansier
- 1974 : La Mandore by Romain Weingarten, directed by Daniel Benoin, Théâtre Daniel Sorano Vincennes
- 1974 : Folies bourgeoises - La Petite Illustration by Roger Planchon, directed by Roger Planchon, Comédie de Saint-Étienne
- 1975 : AA, Theatres of Arthur Adamov by Arthur Adamov, directed by Roger Planchon, TNP Villeurbanne and 1976, Théâtre national de Chaillot
- 1976 : Folies bourgeoises - The Little Illustration, directed by Roger Planchon, Théâtre de la Porte-Saint-Martin
- 1977 : Box and Quotations from Chairman Mao Tse-Tung by Edward Albee, adaptation Matthieu Galey, directed by Laurent Terzieff, Théâtre du Lucernaire
- 1978 : One Hour with Rainer Maria Rilke after Rainer Maria Rilke, directed by Laurent Terzieff, Théâtre du Lucernaire
- 1978 : Fragments by Murray Schisgal, directed by Laurent Terzieff, Théâtre du Lucernaire
- 1979 : The Hunchback by Sławomir Mrożek, directed by Laurent Terzieff, Théâtre national de Chaillot
- 1980 : The Hunchback by Sławomir Mrożek, directed by Laurent Terzieff, Théâtre Hébertot
- 1980 : Milosz after Oscar Milosz, directed by Laurent Terzieff, Théâtre du Lucernaire
- 1981 : An Hour with Rainer Maria Rilke after Rainer Maria Rilke, directed by Laurent Terzieff, Théâtre de La Criée
- 1981 : Milosz after Oscar Milosz, directed by Laurent Terzieff, Théâtre du Lucernaire
- 1981 : The Friends of Arnold Wesker, directed by Yves Gasc, Théâtre du Lucernaire
- 1983 : Milosz after Oscar Milosz, directed by Laurent Terzieff, Théâtre Renaud-Barrault
- 1984 : The Babble of Dangerous Classes by Valère Novarina, directed by Jean Gillibert, Théâtre de la Criée, Centre Georges Pompidou
- 1984 : American Healing by James Saunders, directed by Laurent Terzieff, Theater 13, Théâtre La Bruyère
- 1986 : Testimonies on Brian Friel's Ballyberg, adaptation Pol Quentin, directed by Laurent Terzieff, Théâtre du Lucernaire
- 1986 : The Women Scholars of Molière, directed by Françoise Seigner, Théâtre Boulogne-Billancourt
- 1988 : What Fox Sees by James Saunders, directed by Laurent Terzieff, La Bruyère Theater
- 1989 : Henry IV by Luigi Pirandello, adaptation and staging Armand Delcampe, Théâtre de l'Atelier
- 1990 : What Fox Sees by James Saunders, directed by Laurent Terzieff, Théâtre Hébertot
- 1991 : William Shakespeare's Richard II, directed by Yves Gasc, Théâtre des Célestins, Théâtre de l'Atelier
- 1993 : Another Time by Ronald Harwood, directed by Laurent Terzieff, Théâtre La Bruyère
- 1994 : Another Time by Ronald Harwood, directed by Laurent Terzieff, Théâtre des Célestins
- 1997 : The Bonnet du fou by Luigi Pirandello, directed by Laurent Terzieff, Théâtre de l'Athénée and 1998 Théâtre de l'Atelier
- 2000 : Burned by the Ice by Peter Asmussen, directed by Laurent Terzieff, Théâtre 14 Jean-Marie Serreau
- 2000 : Bertold Brecht, Poems of Bertolt Brecht, directed by Laurent Terzieff, House of Poetry, and 2001 Théâtre de la Gaîté-Montparnasse
- 2001 : Me, Bertold Brecht by Bertolt Brecht, directed by Laurent Terzieff, Théâtre de la Gaîté-Montparnasse

== Adapter ==
- 1965 : Love by Murray Schisgal, Théâtre Montparnasse
- 1966 : Alas, poor Fred! by James Saunders, directed by Laurent Terzieff, Théâtre de Lutèce
- 1968 : Fragments by Murray Schisgal, directed by Laurent Terzieff, Théâtre du Vieux-Colombier
- 1984 : The Typists and the Tiger by Murray Schisgal, adaptation with Laurent Terzieff, Théâtre de Dix-heures

== Translator ==
- 1982 : The Ambassador by Sławomir Mrożek, translation with the author and Laurent Terzieff, directed by Laurent Terzieff, Théâtre Renaud-Barrault

== Awards and Appointments ==
- Molière Award 1988: Best Supporting Actress
- Molière Award 2003: as the adapter for Le Regard (posthumous) - Théâtre Rive Gauche
