= Philippe Adrien =

French actor, director and playwright

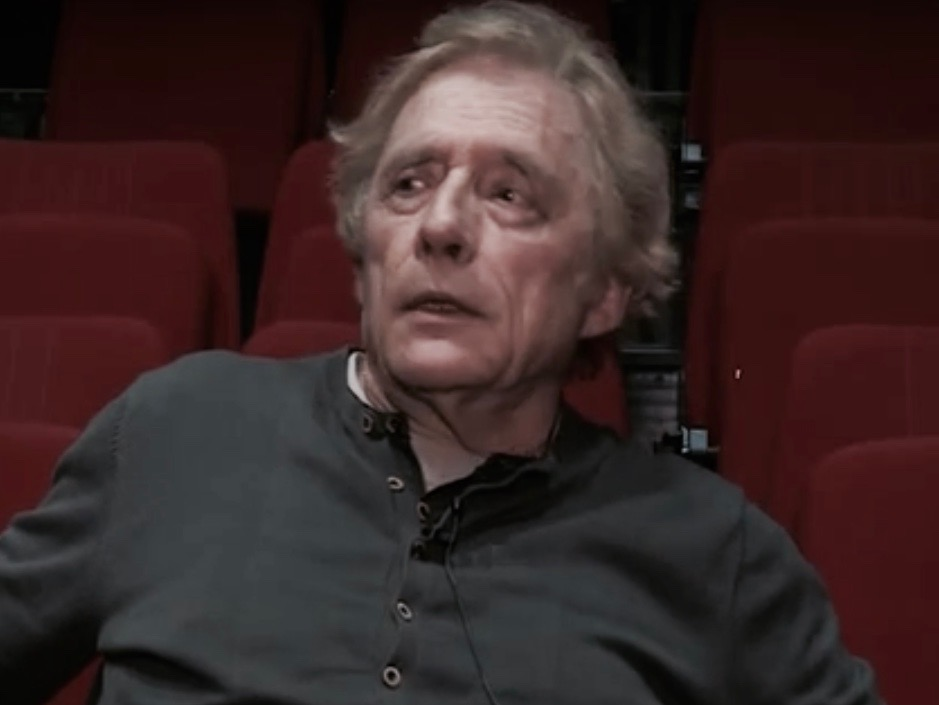
Adrien in 2012

Philippe Adrien (19 December 1939 – 15 September 2021) was a French stage director, actor and playwright. He was associated with the La Tempete company in Paris.

== Actor ==
Adrien appeared in the 1959 war film, Green Harvest.

== Playwright ==
Adrien began to write plays in the late 1960s. In 1967, La Baye was staged by Antoine Bourseiller, featuring Jean-Pierre Léaud and Suzanne Flon. It was staged again in 1997 by Laurent Pelly. La Baye had elements of disorder which would be reflected in Adrien's later work.

Adrien's play, Le Défi de Molière (1979) was dedicated to Moliere.

Adrien has co-written two plays with Jean-Louis Bauer. The first, Bug! creates a dream-journey through memory, current scientific and artistic issues, to provide an overview of civilization. The second, La Grande Nouvelle, is a contemporary variation on Le Malade imaginaire, which plays on the ironies of the present-day desire for immortality.

== Director ==
Adrien's directorial career began in the 1970s. He conducted experimental workshops such as L'excès, a work adapted from Georges Bataille; L'oeil de la tête—effet Sade (which he revisited in 1989 with Enzo Cormann's text Sade, concert d'enfers); Le Pupille veut être tuteur by Peter Handke; and La Résistance.

Adrien directed Molière's works, Dom Juan and George Dandin in Germany.

In the early 1980s, Adrien directed works by Alfred Jarry (Ubu roi and Ubu cocu) and Stanisław Ignacy Witkiewicz (La poule d'eau) At this time, Adrien's direction desired to liberate and provoke. He saw theatre as the scenic transcription of thought processes. In Une Visite, adapted from Franz Kafka's L'Amerique, Adrien's direction showed screwball comedic and jubilatory elements. He also directed Kafka's Rêves.

In 1981, Adrien was named Director of the Théâtre des Quartiers d'Ivry, replacing Antoine Vitez. There, Adrien presented Monsieur de Pourceaugnac (Molière), Homme pour homme (Bertolt Brecht), La Funeste Passion du professeur Forenstein (Adrien), and La Mission (Heiner Müller) .

In 1983, Adrien was invited to La Comédie-Française to direct Molière's Amphitryon and Le Médecin Volant. He worked with the same troupe to produce Jean-Claude Grumberg's Maman revient, pauvre orphelin, Véronique Olmi's Point à la ligne, Hugo von Hofmannsthal's L'Incorruptible, Molière's Monsieur de Pourceaugnac, Werner Schwab's Extermination du peuple, Tom Stoppard's Arcadia, and Genet's Les Bonnes. in this time, Adrien directed two productions of Tennessee Williams: Un tramway nommé désir, with Caroline Cellier, at the Théâtre Eldorado, then Doux oiseau de jeunesse, with Claudia Cardinale, at the Théâtre de la Madeleine.

In 1985, Adrien founded the L'Atelier de Recherche et de Réalisation Théâtrale.

In the 1980s and 1990s, Adrien directed the works of authors including Shakespeare (Hamlet, then Le Roi Lear), Marivaux (Les Acteurs de bonne foi and La Méprise), Claudel (L'Annonce faite à Marie), Brecht (La Noce chez les petits bourgeois), Beckett (En attendant Godot), Vitrac (Victor ou les enfants au pouvoir), Gombrowicz (Yvonne, princesse de Bourgogne), Copi (L'Homosexuel ou la difficulté de s'exprimer), and Armando Llamas (Meurtres de la princesse juive). In 1993, Adrien directed Samuel Beckett's Waiting for Godot at the Théâtre de la Tempête.

In 1997, Adrien directed Arnold Bedouet's Kinkale at the Théâtre National de la Colline. The production received the award for best new play and the award for the best playwright at the Moliere Awards of that year. He went on to direct Philippe Auger's Mélédouman and Le Projet Conrad, an adaptation of the short story Un Avant-poste du progrès. Adrien's interest in African works continued with Boesman et Lena, by the South-African playwright Athol Fugard in 2014 and a stage production of Amos Tutuola's novel L'Ivrogne dans la brousse.

In 2001, Adrien collaborated with the blind actor, Bruno Netter and Netter's Compagnie du Troisième Oeil, a company of handicapped and normally abled actors. Together, they produced Molière's The Imaginary Invalid, Franz Kafka's The Trial, Sophocles' Oedipus Rex, Miguel de Cervantes' Don Quixote, and Eugène Ionesco's The Chairs.

In 2005, Adrien directed a production of Tennessee Williams's Sweet Bird of Youth, which starred Claudia Cardinale.

In 2010, Adrien directed Feydeau's Le Dindon. The production received four nominations at the Molière Awards, toured for three years, and had a revival during the 2014 summer season at the Théâtre de la Porte Saint-Martin.

Adrien died on 15 September 2021, at the age of 81.

== Artistic director ==
In 1996, Adrien became the artistic director of the Théâtre de la Tempête, located in La Cartoucherie, Paris. Adrien has staged Chekov's La Mouette and Ivanov, Claudel's Partage de midi and Protée and Molière's L'École des femmes. Adrien received a nomination for the award for Best Director at the Molière Awards in 2014. The play toured in France until 2016.

Adrien has also staged contemporary writers including Juan Mayorga (La Tortue de Darwin), Werner Schwab (Excédent de poids, insignifiant: amorphe), and Blandine Solange (an adaptation of Exposition d'une femme, lettre d'une psychotique).

== Teacher ==
From 1989 to 2003, Adrien taught at the Conservatoire National Supérieur d'Art Dramatique.

== Prizes and awards ==
- 1985: Grand Prix du théâtre du Syndicat de la critique for Rêves (Kafka) at the Théâtre de la Tempête and revival at the Festival Purchase, New York.
- 1991: nomination for the Prix Dominique for Best Director for L'Annonce faite à Marie.
- 1991: nomination for the Molière Award for Best Director for L'Annonce faite à Marie
- 1997: Molière Award for Best New Show for Kinkali (Arnaud Bédouet).
- 1997: Grand Prix des arts de la scène of Paris.
- 2011: nomination for Molière Award for Best Director for Le Dindon.
- 2011: nomination for the Molière Award for Public Theatre for Le Dindon.
- 2014: nomination for the Molière Award for Public Theatre Show's Best Director for L'École des Femmes.

== Publications ==
- La Baye (1967), Editions Cent Pages.
- L'Arche (1975) Translation of Le Pupille veut être tuteur by Peter Handke.
- Actes Sud-Papiers (1998) Instant par instant, en classe d'interprétation.

== Works ==
=== Cinema ===
- 1959: La Verte Moisson by François Villiers

=== Television ===
- 1964: Les Cinq Dernières Minutes:45 tours... et puis s'en vont by Bernard Hecht

=== Theatre ===
==== Actor ====
- 1964: Le carrosse du saint sacrement by Prosper Mérimée, directed by Henri Rocca, Montpazier (Périgord)
- 1971: Les Brigands by Friedrich von Schiller, directed by Antoine Bourseiller, Théâtre du Gymnase
- 1975: Le pupille veut être tuteur by Peter Handke, directed by Jean-Claude Fall and Philippe Adrien, Théâtre Essaïon

==== Director ====
- 1965: Les Croisés, creation at the Biennale de Paris
- 1967: Arrête d'être belle, creation at the Biennale de Paris
- 1969: La Douloureuse mutation des Zupattes, creation at the Biennale de Paris
- 1970: Albert 1er by Philippe Adrien, creation at the Stadttheater Münster RFA
- 1973: L'Excès, creation at the Petit-Odéon – théâtre national
- 1973: Qu'est-ce qui frappe ici si tôt ? by Philippe Madral, creation at the Théâtre Ouvert, and then at the Festival d'Avignon
- 1973: Frankenstein by Wolfgang Deichsel, creation at the Théâtre Cyrano
- 1973: Dialogades by Serge Ganzl, creation at the Café Théâtre du Tripot
- 1974: La Résistance, creation at the Théâtre des Amandiers de Nanterre
- 1974: Les Bottes de l'ogre
- 1975: L'Œil de la tête – Effet Sade, creation at the Festival Europalia Bruxelles, Festival d'Automne, Théâtre Récamier
- 1975: Albertine by Serge Ganzl, creation at the Petit Odéon – théâtre national
- 1975: Le Pupille veut être tuteur by Peter Handke, creation at the Théâtre Essaïon
- 1976: Représentation, creation at the Théâtre Essaïon
- 1977: George Dandin by Molière, creation at the Schauspielhaus de Düsseldorf, RFA
- 1979: Dom Juan by Molière, creation at the Schauspielhaus de Düsseldorf, RFA
- 1979: Le Défi by Molière, creation at the C.D.N. de Reims
- 1980: Ubu roi by Alfred Jarry, creation at the C.D.N. de Reims
- 1980: La Poule d'eau by S.I. Witkiewicz, creation at the Théâtre de la Commune d'Aubervilliers, and then at the Festival Bitef de Belgrade
- 1981: Monsieur de Pourceaugnac by Molière, creation at the C.D.N. de Reims, and then at the Théâtre de la Commune d'Aubervilliers and at the Théâtre des Quartiers d'Ivry
- 1981: Une visite after Franz Kafka, creation at the Théâtre de la Tempête in 1981, then at the Festival de Florence, Festival de Saarbrück
- 1982: La Mission by Heiner Müller, creation at the Théâtre des Quartiers d'Ivry
- 1982: Correspondances from Gérard de Nerval, creation at the Festival Les Intérieurs
- 1982: La Funeste Passion du professeur Forenstein, creation at the Théâtre des Quartiers d'Ivry
- 1983: Amphitryon and Le Médecin volant by Molière, creation at the Comédie Française
- 1983: Homme pour homme by Bertolt Brecht, Fartov and Belcher, creation at the Théâtre des Quartiers d'Ivry and at the C.D.N. de Reims
- 1984: Rêves by Kafka // Prix de la Critique 85, creation at the Théâtre des Quartiers d'Ivry, at the Centre Georges Pompidou, at the Théâtre National de Strasbourg, in RFA, at the Hollande Festival, revival at the Théâtre de la Tempête in 1985, tour at the Festival Purchase – New-York in 1985 [59 shows]
- 1985: Ké Voï ? by Enzo Cormann, creation at the Festival d'Avignon, revival at the Théâtre de la Tempête [55 shows]
- 1986: Des Aveugles by Hervé Guibert, creation at the Théâtre de la Tempête / Festival d'Automne in 1986 [47 shows]
- 1987: La Vénus à la fourrure from Sacher Masoch and Les Pragmatistes by Witkiewicz, creation at the Théâtre de la Tempête in 1987 [57 shows]
- 1987: La Méprise and Les Acteurs de bonne foi by Marivaux, creation at the Théâtre de l'Athénée in 1987
- 1988: Cami, drames de la vie courante by Cami, creation at the Théâtre de la Tempête in 1988, tour around France and Denmark (Hvidovre Teater) [110 shows]
- 1989: Amou'toujou', recital with Lisette Malidor, creation at the MAC de Créteil in 1989, worldwide tour from 1990 to 1999 [62 shows]
- 1989: Sade, concert d'enfers by Enzo Cormann, creation at the Théâtre de la Tempête in 1989 [27 shows]
- 1989: Le Journal intime by Luc Ferrari, musical theatre, creation at the Lierre, tour
- 1990: L'Annonce faite à Marie by Paul Claudel, creation at the Théâtre de la Tempête in 1990, revival at the Théâtre de la Tempête in 1991, tour around France, Europe Centrale, ex-USSR in 1993 [125 shows]
- 1991: Les Bacchantes by Euripide, French translation by Jean-Daniel Magnin, creation at L'Hippodrome – Douai, at the Sorano – CDN de Toulouse and at the TGP [30 shows]
- 1992: Le Baladin du monde occidental by John Millington Synge, creation at the Théâtre National de Bretagne (TNB) in December 1992
- 1992: Grand-peur et misère du IIIe Reich by Bertolt Brecht, creation at the Théâtre de la Tempête in October 1992, tour in 1994 [68 shows]
- 1993: La Tranche by Jean-Daniel Magnin, creation at the Théâtre Ouvert in January 1993, then at the Festival d'Avignon in July 1993 and at the Théâtre de la Bastille in September 1993 [39 shows]
- 1993: En attendant Godot by Samuel Beckett, creation at the Festival de Blaye in August 1993 and at the Théâtre de la Tempête in September 1993, revival at the Théâtre de la Tempête in 1994, worldwide tour in 1994, 1995 and 1996 [179 shows]
- 1994: Gustave n'est pas moderne by Armando Llamas, creation at the Théâtre de la Colline in April 1994 [53 shows]
- 1994: You-you by Jovan Atchine and Jeanne du métro by Vidosav Stevanovic, creation at the Petit-Odéon – Théâtre de l'Europe in 1994 [8 shows]
- 1994: Maman revient, pauvre orphelin by Jean-Claude Grumberg, creation at the Comédie Française in the Théâtre du Vieux-Colombier in November 1994
- 1995: La Noce chez les Petits-Bourgeois by Bertolt Brecht, creation at the Festival de Blaye in August 1995 and then at the Théâtre de la Tempête in September 1995, tour around France from November 1995 to February 1996 [112 shows]
- 1995: Les Bonnes by Jean Genet, creation at the Comédie Française at the Théâtre du Vieux-Colombier in November 1995, revivals at the Théâtre du Vieux-Colombier and salle Richelieu in 1997, 1998 and 2000, tour around France
- 1995: Diverses blessures by Enzo Cormann, musical theatre, creation at the Théâtre de la Tempête in December 1995, revival in December 1996 [30 shows]
- 1996: Hamlet by Shakespeare, creation at the Théâtre de la Tempête in September 1996, tour around France in 1996, revival at the Théâtre de la Tempête in September 1997, tour around France and the French Antilles in 1997 [109 shows]
- 1997: Kinkali by Arnaud Bedouët // Molière Awards 1997 of Best New Show and Best Playwright, creation at the Théâtre de la Colline in January 1997, tour around France
- 1997: L'Homosexuel ou la difficulté de s'exprimer by Copi, creation at the Théâtre de la Tempête in September 1997, tour at the international festival of Sarajevo in October 1997 (Prix d'interprétation), revival at the Théâtre de la Tempête in September [67 shows]
- 1998: La Fiancée du vent, texts and songs on slavery, with Lisette Malidor, creation at the TILF in May 1998, tour around France and the Indian Ocean in 1998, tour around France and the French Antilles in 1999 [21 shows]
- 1998: Victor ou les Enfants au pouvoir de Roger Vitrac, creation at the Chantiers de Blaye in August 1998 and then at the Théâtre de la Tempête in September 1998, tour around France / Luxembourg in 1998 and 2000 [108 shows]
- 1998: Point à la ligne by Véronique Olmi, creation in November 1999 at the Comédie Française in the Théâtre du Vieux-Colombier
- 1998: Arcadia by Tom Stoppard, creation in November 1999 at the Comédie Française in the Théâtre du Vieux-Colombier, then in the salle Richelieu
- 1999: Un tramway nommé désir by Tennessee Williams, creation at the Théâtre de l'Eldorado in January 1999
- 1999: L'Incorruptible by Hugo von Hofmannsthal, creation at the Comédie Française in the Théâtre du Vieux-Colombier in November 1999
- 1999: Excédent de poids:insignifiant, amorphe by Werner Schwab, creation at the Théâtre de la Tempête in September 1999 [30 shows]
- 2000: Le Roi Lear by Shakespeare, creation at the Théâtre de la Tempête in September 2000, revival at the Théâtre de la Tempête in September 2001, tours in 2000, 2001 and 2002 [118 shows]
- 2001: Monsieur de Pourceaugnac by Molière, creation at the Théâtre du Vieux Colombier in September 2001
- 2001: Le Malade imaginaire by Molière (with the Compagnie du 3e Œil), creation at the Festival d'Avignon in July 2001 and then at the Théâtre de la Tempête in September 2001, revival at the Théâtre de la Tempête in 2003, tour from 2001 to 2003 [219 shows]
- 2002: L'Ivrogne dans la brousse by Amos Tutuola, adapted to the stage by Philippe Adrien, creation at the Festival Les Chantiers de Blaye in August 2002 and then at the Théâtre de la Tempête in September 2002, revival and tour in 2003/04 [104 shows]
- 2002: Extermination du peuple by Werner Schwab, creation at the Comédie Française in the Théâtre du Vieux-Colombier in November 2002
- 2003: L'Incroyable Voyage by Gilles Granouillet, creation at the Théâtre de la Tempête in January 2003, revival at the Comédie de Saint-Etienne and in Nice [34 shows]
- 2003: L'Enfant rêve by Hanokh Levin, creation at the Théâtre de la Tempête in June 2003
- 2003: Cadavres exquis from the Grand-Guignol's repertoire, creation at the Théâtre de la Tempête in November 2003, tour in 2004 [39 shows]
- 2004: Rufus joue les fantaisistes, creation at the Festival d'Avignon in July 2004, revival at the Théâtre du Rond-Point
- 2004: Yvonne, princesse de Bourgogne by Witold Gombrowicz, creation at the Théâtre de la Tempête in September 2004, tour in 2005/06 [81 shows]
- 2005: Doux Oiseau de jeunesse by Tennessee Williams, creation at the Théâtre de la Madeleine
- 2005: Le Procès by Kafka (with the Compagnie du 3e Œil), creation at the Théâtre de la Tempête in January 2005, revival and tour in 2006
- 2005: Mélédouman by Philippe Auger, creation in Brazzaville (Congo), tour in the Central African Republic, revival at the Théâtre de la Tempête in April 2005 [19 shows for the creation]
- 2005: La Noce chez les Petits-Bourgeois… créoles after Bertolt Brecht, creation at the Festival d'Avignon in 2005, revival at the Théâtre de la Tempête in April 2006 [27 shows]
- 2005: Andromaque by Racine, creation at the Théâtre de la Tempête in September 2005, tour around France and Morocco from October 2006 to July 2007 [91 shows]
- 2005: L'Ecclésiaste, creation at the Théâtre de la Tempête in September 2005 [30 shows]
- 2006: Phèdre by Racine, creation in Martinique in May 2006, revival at the Théâtre de la Tempête in September 2006
- 2006: La Mouette by Anton Tchekhov, creation at the Théâtre de la Tempête in September 2006, tour and revival from January to April 2008 [84 shows]
- 2007: Meurtres de la princesse juive by Armando Llamas, creation at the Théâtre de la Tempête in March 2007, tour in April 2007 [33 shows]
- 2007: Don Quichotte by Miguel de Cervantes (with the Compagnie du 3e Œil), creation at the Théâtre de la Tempête in September 2007 [58 shows]
- 2008: Ivanov by Anton Tchekhov, creation at the Théâtre de la Tempête in September 2008, revival and tour from January to May 2010 [94 shows]
- 2009: Œdipe by Sophocle (with the Compagnie du 3e Œil), creation at the Théâtre de la Tempête in January 2009 [30 shows]
- 2009: Une vie de château by Jean-Louis Bauer and Michel Couvelard, creation at the Théâtre de la Tempête in June 2009 [5 shows]
- 2009: Le Projet Conrad, un avant-poste du progrès after Joseph Conrad, creation at the Théâtre de la Tempête in September 2009 [34 shows]
- 2010: Le Dindon by Georges Feydeau // 4 nominations for the Molière Awards 2011, creation at the Théâtre de la Tempête in September 2010, revival at the Théâtre de la Tempête in September 2011, tour from January to June 2012 and from December 2012 to May 2013, revival in Paris in June 2013 [229 shows]
- 2011: La Tortue de Darwin by Juan Mayorga, creation at the Théâtre des Osses (Suisse) in March 2011 [24 shows]
- 2011: Les Chaises by Eugène Ionesco (with the Compagnie du 3e Œil), creation at the Festival d'Avignon in July 2011 and then at the Théâtre de la Tempête in October 2011 [58 shows]
- 2012: Ce soir, on improvise by Luigi Pirandello, creation at L'Atrium – scène nationale de la Martinique in January 2012
- 2012: L'Affaire by Jean-Louis Bauer, creation at the Théâtre de la Tempête in June 2012 [4 shows]
- 2012: Bug ! by Jean-Louis Bauer and Philippe Adrien, creation at the Théâtre de la Tempête in September 2012 [31 shows]
- 2012: Exposition d'une femme after Blandine Solange, creation at the Théâtre de la Tempête in November 2012 [28 shows]
- 2013: Partage de midi by Paul Claudel // nomination for the Palmarès du théâtre 2013, creation at the Théâtre de la Tempête in January 2013, tour from January to February 2014 [43 shows]
- 2013: Protée by Paul Claudel // Prix Poquelin, creation at the Théâtre de la Tempête in January 2013, revival and tour from January to May 2014 [50 shows]
- 2013: L'Ecole des femmes by Molière // nomination for the Molière Award 2014 for Best Director and for the Molière Award 2015 for Feminine Revelation, creation at the Théâtre de la Tempête in September 2013, tour from November 2014 to April 2015 and from November 2015 to May 2016 [more than 125 shows]
- 2014: Boesman et Lena by Athol Fugard, creation at the Grace Art Théâtre (Guadeloupe) and Chapelle du Verbe Incarné (Avignon) in 2014, revival at the Théâtre de la Tempête in March 2015 [59 shows]
- 2015: La Grande Nouvelle by Jean-Louis Bauer and Philippe Adrien // nomination for the Molière 2015 for Female Newcomer, creation at the Théâtre de la Tempête in September 2014 [27 shows]
- 2015: La Maison d'à côté by Sharr White // nomination for the Molière Award 2015 for Best Supporting Actress, creation at the Théâtre du Petit Saint Martin in January 2015
- 2015: The Curious Incident of the Dog in the Night-Time by Simon Stephens, adapted from the novel by Mark Haddon, creation at the Théâtre de la Tempête from 11 September to 18 October 2015
