= Isabelle Weingarten =

French actress (1950–2020)

- Born: 18 April 1950; Paris, France
- Died: 3 August 2020 (aged 70)
- Occupation: Actress

Isabelle Weingarten (18 April 1950 – 3 August 2020) was a French actress, model, and photographer.

== Biography ==
Weingarten was born on 18 April 1950 in Paris into a family of artists. She was the granddaughter of Silvia Loeb-Luzzatto and art dealer Pierre Loeb on her maternal side. On her paternal side, her grandparents were the Polish-Jewish painter Joachim Weingart and the sculptor Muriel Marquet-Pontrémoli.

Discovered in 1971 by Robert Bresson, who offered her the main role in Four Nights of a Dreamer. Subsequently, she starred in The Mother and the Whore in 1973, directed by Jean Eustache. A longtime photographer, she began working for Cahiers du Cinéma in 1986 as a portrait painter, and photography became her main activity. In 2008, she began studying the works of her father, Romain Weingarten, poet and playwright.

Weingarten was married to Benjamin Baltimore from 1968 to 1978. She then married Wim Wenders, who she divorced in 1983. Lastly, she was married to Olivier Assayas until their divorce in 1996. Weingarten died on 3 August 2020.

== Filmography ==
- Four Nights of a Dreamer (1971)
- The Mother and the Whore (1973)
- La Belle au bois dormant (1973)
- La Dernière Carte (1974)
- La Vérité sur l'imaginaire passion d'un inconnu (1974)
- Closet Children (1977)
- The Territory (1981)
- The State of Things (1982)
- Petit Joseph (1982)
- Pablo est mort (1983)
- La Consultation (1985)
- The Satin Slipper (1985)
- Un amour à Paris (1987)
- Caftan d'amour (1988)
- Accord parfait (1988)
- Erreur de jeunesse (1989)
- Carillon (1993)
- On appelle ça... le printemps (2001)
- Le lion est mort ce soir (2017)

== Theatre ==
- Les Cuisines du château (1971)
- Graal-théâtre (1978)
- Tête d'or (1980)
- Allez hop! (1984)
- Les Parisiens (1986)

== Photography ==
- Portrait du dimanche (2002)
- Collection on display at the Cinémathique Française (2008)
- Expositions at the Chalon-sur-Saône (1993), Institut Lumière de Lyon (1996), Vienna (1996), Paris (2000), and Avignon (2001)

== Adaptations and Staging ==
- Maame fait ce qu'elle dit (2008)
- Avez-vous déjà rencontré Bonaparte (2014)
