= Green Harvest (1959 film) =

- Theatrical poster
- Directed by: François Villiers
- Written by: François Boyer; Henri Brunel; Rémo Forlani; Alain Poiré; François Villiers
- Produced by: Claude Clert; Alain Poiré
- Starring: Pierre Dux; Dany Saval; Jacques Perrin
- Cinematography: Paul Soulignac
- Edited by: Edouard Berne
- Music by: Jacques Bondon
- Production company: Caravelle
- Distributed by: Gaumont Distribution
- Release date: 2 December 1959
- Running time: 95 minutes
- Country: France
- Language: French

Green Harvest (French:La verte moisson) is a 1959 French war drama film directed by François Villiers and starring Pierre Dux, Dany Saval and Jacques Perrin.

== Plot ==
In occupied France during the Second World War, a group of school students begin to take action against the German forces.

== Cast ==
- Pierre Dux as L'aumônier du lycée
- Dany Saval as Dany
- Jacques Perrin as Jean-Louis Mesnier
- Francis Lemonnier as Olivier Guerbois
- Claude Brasseur as Robert Borelli
- Philippe Adrien as Le fumeur
- Jacques Gencel as Rouquier
- Jacques Higelin as Mercadier
- Jacques Cousin as Duval
- Gérard Dauzat as Schneider
- Jean-Pierre Ely as Bory
- Philippe Féron as Laplanche
- Robert Kimmich as Gaubert
- Marie-France Boyer as Sophie
- René Blancard as M. Borelli
- Hélène Tossy as Mme Borelli
- Camille Fournier as Mme Guerbois
- Jeanne Pérez as Mlle Froment
- François Chaumette as German chaplain
- Jean-Marie Serreau
- René Berthier
- Jacques Monod
- Reinhard Kolldehoff

== Bibliography ==
- Philippe Rège. Encyclopedia of French Film Directors, Volume 1. Scarecrow Press, 2009.
