= Daybreak (1949 film) =

1949 film

- Directed by: Louis Daquin
- Written by: Louis Daquin; Vladimir Pozner
- Produced by: Jean Schapira
- Starring: Jean Desailly; René Lefèvre; Loleh Bellon
- Cinematography: André Bac
- Edited by: Claude Nicole
- Music by: Jean Wiener
- Production company: Ciné France
- Distributed by: Alliance Générale de Distribution Cinématographique
- Release date: 7 April 1949
- Running time: 101 minutes
- Country: France
- Language: French

Daybreak or The Mark of the Day (French: Le Point du jour) is a 1949 French drama film directed by Louis Daquin and starring Jean Desailly, René Lefèvre and Loleh Bellon. It is set in a coal-mining community in the north of France. The film's sets were designed by the art director Paul Bertrand. It was entered into that year's Karlovy Vary Film Festival.

== Cast ==
- Jean Desailly as Larzac
- René Lefèvre as Dubard
- Loleh Bellon as Marie Brehard
- Jean-Pierre Grenier as Marles
- Michel Piccoli as Georges Gohelle
- Marie-Hélène Dasté as Mme. Brhard
- Suzanne Demars as La mère Gohelle
- Guy Favières as Un vieux mineur
- Paul Frankeur as Bac
- Hélène Gerber as Emma Marles
- Lise Graf as La mère Marles
- Serge Grave as Corentin
- Léon Larive as Vetusto
- Pierre Latour as Noël
- Gaston Modot as Tiberghien
- Catherine Monot as Louise
- Guy Sargis as Roger
- Julien Verdier as Un mineur

== Bibliography ==
- Lloyd, Ann & Robinson, David. The Illustrated History of the Cinema. Macmillan, 1987.
- Hayward, Susan & Vincendeau, Ginette . French Film: Texts and Contexts. Psychology Press, 2000.
