= Carlos Semprún =

Spanish writer, playwright and journalist (1926–2009)

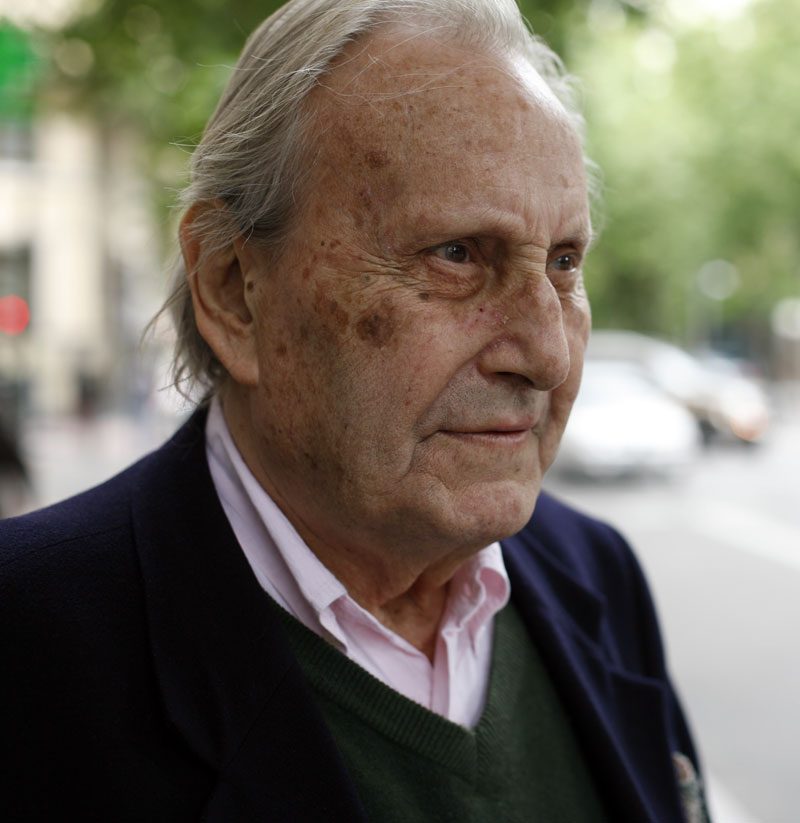
Carlos Semprún Maura in 2008

Carlos Semprún Maura (23 November 1926 – 23 March 2009) was a Spanish writer, playwright and journalist, mainly working in the French language.

== Biography ==
Semprún was born in Madrid. The son of the Spanish politician, writer and diplomat José María Semprún Gurrea (1893–1966) and Susana Maura Gamazo, the youngest daughter of Antonio Maura who served several times as prime minister of Spain, he was the brother of the writer Jorge Semprún, father of Diego Semprún and uncle of the essayist Jaime Semprún and the tennis player Pablo Semprún.

From 1936 he remained outside of his native Spain (his father José María Semprún Gurrea was a diplomat to the Republican government during the Spanish Civil War) and later continued in exile after Franco's victory. He was a militant member of the Communist Party of Spain during its first years, but left the Party before the expulsion of his brother Jorge. He continued his anti-Francoist militancy in other left-wing groups. In the magazine that published 'Acción Comunista' he signed articles with the pseudonym Lorenzo Torres. In the 2000s his ideological "evolution" placed him in very critical positions towards the left in general. He called himself liberal, anti-communist and said that democracy was only possible in capitalism.

He was a film critic for Diario 16 and regularly collaborated in Libertad Digital and La Ilustración Liberal with his 'Cosmopolitan Chronicles' and his 'Letter of Paris', being one of its first columnists. He wrote over 50 plays: in 1971 his play The Sleeping Man was performed at the Théâtre du Lucernaire in Paris starring Pascale de Boysson and was directed by Laurent Terzieff.

He died in Paris on 23 March 2009 aged 82.

== Books ==
- Revolution and Counterrevolution in Catalonia (1936-1937), Tusquets, Barcelona, 1978. Version in Spanish
- Neither God nor Master, nor CNT, Tusquets, Barcelona 1978.
- Life and lie of Jean-Paul Sartre, Nossa and Jara, Madrid, 1996.
- Dust lines and other stories, Pre-Texts, Valencia, 1997.
- The Exile Was a Party, Planeta, Barcelona, 1999.
- The Prodigious Adventures, Seix Barral, Barcelona, 2004.
- On the Banks of the Seine, a Spanish ..., Madrid, Hoja Perenne, 2006
