= There's No Smoke Without Fire =

1973 film

- Film poster
- Directed by: André Cayatte
- Written by: André Cayatte; Pierre Dumayet
- Produced by: Lucien Massé
- Starring: Annie Girardot
- Cinematography: Maurice Fellous
- Release date: 16 May 1973
- Running time: 120 minutes
- Countries: France; Italy
- Language: French

There's No Smoke Without Fire (French: Il n'y a pas de fumée sans feu) is a 1973 French-Italian thriller film directed by André Cayatte. It was entered into the 23rd Berlin International Film Festival where it won the Silver Bear Special Jury Prize.

== Plot ==
In the Paris suburb of Chavigny, Joseph Boussard (André Falcon) holds political office in the lead up to an election. When a campaigner for the opposition is killed, the respected Dr. Peyrac (Bernard Fresson) decides to contest the election. One of Boussard's aides obtains and circulates a doctored photograph of Peyrac's wife, Sylvie (Annie Girardot), engaged in group sex at the home of their friends, the Leroys. Peyrac calls for the authenticity of the photograph to be validated but is shut down.

The photographer who produced the fake is murdered; Peyrac is accused for the crime and imprisoned. Sylvie defends her husband with the assistance of Olga Leroy (Mireille Darc). Olga knows people in high places who could be affected by the scandal. Peyrac is released but the scandal has negatively impacted on his standing with his friends and his support of the community.

== Cast ==
- Annie Girardot as Sylvie Peyrac
- Mireille Darc as Olga Leroy
- Bernard Fresson as Dr. Peyrac
- Michel Bouquet as Morlaix
- André Falcon as Boussard
- Paul Amiot as Georges Arnaud
- Micheline Boudet as Corinne
- Pascale de Boysson as Véronique
- Marc Michel as Jean-Paul Leroy
- Georges Riquier as The Judge
- Frédéric Simon as Peyrac's Son
- Mathieu Carrière as Ulrich Berl
- Marthe Villalonga
- Nathalie Courval
- André Reybaz
- Pierre Tabard
