= Jacques Bondon =

French composer (1927–2008)

Jacques Bondon (full name Jacques Laurent Jules Désiré Bondon; 6 December 1927 – 2 April 2008) was a French composer.

== Life ==
Bondon was born in Boulbon (Bouches-du-Rhône). He arrived in Paris aged nineteen to study music. He began studying the violin, learned harmony and counterpoint with Georges Dandelot and Charles Koechlin and composition with Darius Milhaud and Jean Rivier at the Conservatoire de Paris. In 1962, he founded the Orchestre de Chambre de Musique Contemporaine (O.C.M.C.), which became the Ensemble Moderne de Paris (E.M.P.) six years later. In 1974, he was appointed member of the National Commission for Popular Music at the Ministry of Cultural Affairs. Since 1981, he has been Director of the Conservatoire municipal de musique of the 20th arrondissement of Paris.

He died in Coulommiers (Seine-et-Marne) on 2 April 2008 at age 80.

== Works ==
=== Instrumental and orchestral music ===
- Essai pour un paysage lunaire, for chamber orchestra (1951)
- Sonatine d'été, for violin and piano (1953)
- La Coupole, Tableaux fantastiques d'un monde étrange, for orchestra (1954)
- Le Taillis ensorcelé, for double string orchestra, brass and percussion (1954)
- Concerto pour Martenot (1955)
- Les Insolites, for piano (1956)
- Kaléïdoscope for Ondes Martenot, piano and drums (1957)
- Chants de Feu et de Lune, for piano and Ondes Martenot (1957)
- Concert de printemps, for piano, strings and percussion (1957)
- Suite indienne, for orchestra (1958)
- Quatuor à cordes No 1 (1959)
- Giocoso, for solo violin and strings (1960)
- Musique pour un autre monde, for orchestra (1962)
- Fleurs de feu, for orchestra (1965)
- Concerto de Mars, for guitar and orchestra (1966)
- La Maya, pour 13 percussions (1967)
- Contes et merveilles, for chamber orchestra (1967)
- Ivanhoe, for orchestra (1968)
- Concerto de Molines, for violin and orchestra (1968)
- Sonate pour un ballet (1969)
- 3 Nocturnes for guitar (1970)
- Le Soleil multicolore, for flute, harp and viola (1970)
- Mouvement chorégraphique for flute and piano (1971)
- Musique pour un jazz différent, percussion quartet (1971)
- Swing No 1 for flute and harp (1973)
- Symphonie latine (1973)
- Swing No 2, for guitar (1973)
- Chant et danse, for trombone and small orchestra (1976)
- Lumières et formes animées, for orchestra (1977)
- Concerto solaire, for 7 brass and large orchestra (1977)
- Concerto d'octobre for clarinet and strings (1978)
- Swing No 3 for trumpet and piano (1979)
- Symphonie concertante, for piano and wind instruments (1979)
- Sonates à six, for 2 flutes, 2 clarinets, 2 alto saxophones (1979)
- Le Tombeau de Schubert, for piano and string quartet (1979)
- Movimenti, clarinet or saxophone quartet (1980)
- Concerto con fuoco, for guitar and strings (1981)
- Lever du jour for trumpet and organ (1982)
- Concerto pour un ballet, for flute and orchestra (1982)
- 3 Images concertantes, for bassoon and orchestra (1982)
- Les folklores imaginaires for wind quintett ({1st suite) (1985)
- Les folklores imaginaires for guitar, flute and violin (2nd suite) (1986)
- Primavera, for brass sextet (1995)
- Concerto Cantabile, for cello and orchestra (1996)
- Concerto vivo, for harp and string orchestra (1st version) (1997)
- Concerto vivo, for harp and string orchestra (2nd version) (1998)
- Concerto des Offrandes for clarinet and orchestra (1998)

=== Vocal and theatrical music ===
- Chant d'amour et de peine, for voice and piano or small orchestra (1952)
- Le Pain de serpent, for voice and 14 instruments (1959)
- La Résurrection, oratorio (1975)
- Les Monts de l'étoile, for soprano, string quartet and piano (or soprano and orchestra) (1978)
- 3 Complaintes, for soprano and guitar (1982)
- Le Chemin de croix, oratorio for choir, 3 soloists and orchestra (1985)

Operas

- La Nuit foudroyée (1963).
- Les Arbres (1964)
- Mélusine au rocher (1968)
- Ana et l'albatros (1970).
- I-330 (1975) science fiction opera (to a libretto by Jean Goury, after the novel Nous autres by Yevgeny Zamyatin) (premiere, Opéra de Nantes, 1975)

=== Film music and other commissions ===
- Green Harvest by François Villiers (1959)
- Music for the Opening Ceremony of the Winter Olympic Games of Grenoble (1968).

== Bibliography ==
- Baker, Theodore; Slonimsky, Nicolas (1995). Baker's Biographical Dictionary of Musicians. Bouquins (in French). Vol. 1. Paris: Éditions Robert Laffont. p. 482. ISBN 2-221-06510-7.
- Pérez Gutiérrez, Mariano (1985). "BONDON, Jacques". Diccionario de la música y los músicos (in Spanish). Vol. 1. Ediciones AKAL. p. 185. ISBN 9788470901409.
