= Loleh Bellon =

French actress (1925–1999)

Marie Laure Viole Bellon, generally known as Loleh Bellon (1925–1999), was a French stage and film actress, as well as a playwright. In 1949, for her role in Robert Desnos' La Place de l'Étoile, she was awarded the Prix des Jeunes comédiens. She is remembered for her performances in Giraudoux' Judith, and in Claudel's L'Annonce faite à Marie. Bellon was also a successful playwright, especially with Dames du jeudi (1976), Une absence (1988), and La Chambre d'amis (1995). For her play L'Éloignement (1987), she was awarded the Molière prize.

== Early life and family ==
Born on 14 May 1925 in Bayonne, Marie Laure Viole Bellon was the daughter of Jacques Bellon, a magistrate, and Denise Simone Hulmann, a well-known photographer. In 1947, she married the Spanish writer Jorge Semprún Maura (1923–2011), with whom she gave birth to Jaime Semprún (1947–2010), also a writer. Following a divorce in 1960, she married the poet Claude Roy (1915–1997) in 1962. Loleh Bellon was the younger sister of the film director and screenwriter Yannick Bellon.

== Professional life ==
Bellon studied for the theatre under the Russian-born actress and drama teacher Tania Balachova, the actor and theatre manager Charles Dullin, and the actor Julien Bertheau. After making her stage début in 1945 in J. B. Priestley's Dangerous Corner, in 1947, she played in L'An Mil by Jules Romains. In 1949, for her performance in La Place de l'Étoile, she was awarded the Prix des Jeunes comédiens.

She embarked on her cinema career in the late 1940s, working with Jean-Louis Barrault and Jean Vilar. Her first major success was the role of Marie in Le Point du jour (1949), directed by Louis Daquin. She appeared in two more of Daquin's films – The Perfume of the Lady in Black (1949), and Maître après Dieu (1950). Thanks to her sister Yannick Bellon, in the 1970s, she starred in Quelque part quelqu'un (1972) and Jamais plus toujours (1976).

As a playwright, in 1976, her Les Dames du Jeudi was awarded the Ibsen prize. Other successes included L'èloignement (1987), Une absence (1988), and La Chambre d'amis (1995).

Loleh Bellon died on 22 May 1999 in Le Kremlin-Bicêtre, in the Paris suburbs.

== Public activities ==
In May 1951, Loleh Bellon was the sponsor of a subscription contest for Femmes françaises, a communist women's magazine.

She supported the feminist campaign to legalize abortion on demand in France.
