= Marcel Moussy =

French screenwriter and television director

Marcel Moussy (7 May 1924 – 10 August 1995) was a French screenwriter and television director.

Moussy was born in Algiers. He was co-nominated with François Truffaut for the Academy Award for Best Original Screenplay for the film The 400 Blows (1959). He died in Caen, aged 71.

== Selected filmography ==
- The Verdict (1959)
- The 400 Blows (1959)
- Le Maître de pension (1973 - writer and director)
