= Le Maître de pension =

1973 film

- Written by: Marcel Moussy; André Dhôtel
- Directed by: Marcel Moussy
- Starring: Maurice Garrel
- Country of origin: France
- Original language: French

Original release
- Release: 10 May 1973

Le Maître de pension is a 1973 French film directed by Marcel Moussy.

== Cast ==
- Maurice Garrel - Romeyre
- Pascal Bressy - Michaël
- Pierre Tornade - Jaminet
- Isabelle Huppert - Annie
- Fernand Berset - Berbet
- Pascale de Boysson - Blanche
- Daniel Martin - Ramusot
- Patrick de Backer - Filasse
- Franck Dubreuil - Tatane
- Roland Demongeot - Grand Pierre
- Muse Dalbray - Pascaline
- Hélène Legrand - Angélique
- Louis Bugette - Ferrier
- Andrée Damant - Fernande Cormat
- Marius Laurey - Cormat
- Bernard Dumaine - Crèvecoeur
- Georgs Lucas - Degornur
- Dominique Vozel - Louise
- Georgina Lefebvre - Lisa
- Giu Gam - Une voisine
- Jo Charrier - Laurioux

== See also ==
- Isabelle Huppert on screen and stage
