= Jaime Semprún =

Jaime Semprún (1947–2010) was a French essayist and translator. He was born and died in Paris.

== Biography ==
The son of Jorge Semprún and nephew of the writer Carlos Semprún, Jaime Semprún was close to the film director Philippe Garrel – he appeared in his movie, Le Lit de la Vierge, 1970 along with Zouzou and Valérie Lagrange – and made a short movie himself, Le Meurtre du père, and a feature-length movie, La Sainte Famille (1968), he then turned his interest towards social issues and the Situationist International. He contributed articles to L'Assommoir edited by Roger Langlais, he published two essays for the Champ libre editions during the 1970s : Social War in Portugal and Précis de récupération. In 1980 Semprún published La Nucléarisation du monde, an essay in which he denounced the evils of nuclear power. Jaime Semprún was then at the origin of the creation of the Post-Situationist group and journal Encyclopédie des Nuisances, of which he was the main actor. Fifteen issues are published between 1984 and 1992, before it became, in 1991, a publishing house, the Éditions de l'Encyclopédie des Nuisances.

Jaime Semprún gave a lot of his time, along with Anne Krief (his partner) and Michel Pétris, to the translation and publication of the writings of George Orwell unpublished in France at the time for the éditions Ivrea coedited with the éditions de l'Encyclopédie des Nuisances, a work he started, according to Christophe Bourseiller, "under the auspices" of Guy Debord and Gérard Lebovici. Four volumes of Essais, articles, lettres by Orwell were published between 1995 and 2001.

Through his own works and the ones he published, Semprún developed a radical critique of the state and industrial society. In this regard, he belongs to anti-industrialism.

In his book Défense et illustration de la novlangue française published in 2005, Jaime Semprún analysed the transformation of the French language at the time of the omnipresence of technology and computers.

In 2008, 40 years after May 68, Semprún published Catastrophisme, administration du désastre et soumission durable, written with René Riesel, in which he developed his critique of contemporary industrial society, including different leftist, activist movements, advocates of curtailing economic growth and state environmentalism. This book contains as an annex the critique of the book by Anselm Jappe, Les Aventures de la marchandise.

In 2009, he published Discours préliminaire de l'Encyclopédie des Nuisances with a new previously unpublished foreword, 25 years after its first publication in 1984.

Jaime Semprún died of a cerebral hemorrhage on 3 August 2010 aged 63.

In January 2011, the Éditions de l'Encyclopédie des Nuisances published a posthumous essay of his, Andromaque, je pense à vous !. This text, written in 2000 on the occasion of the first anniversary of his mother's death (Loleh Bellon, 1925–1999), is a sentimental dérive in Paris. It is completed by 2 essays, which have remained unfinished, on the painter Pascal Vinardel and the abolition of art by mass society.
