= Jean-Pierre Vincent =

French theatrical actor and director (1942–2020)

- Born: 26 August 1942; Juvisy-sur-Orge, France
- Died: 5 November 2020 (aged 78); Mallemort, France
- Occupations: Actor; Director

Jean-Pierre Vincent (26 August 1942 – 5 November 2020) was a French theatrical actor and director.

He served as Administrator of the Comédie-Française from 1983 to 1986.

== Theatre ==
- The Broken Jug (1963)
- Scènes populaires (1963)
- A Respectable Wedding (1968)
- Tambours et trompettes (1969)
- Les Acteurs de bonne foi (1970)
- Le Marquis de Montefosco (1970)
- La Cagnotte (1971)
- Capitaine Schelle, Capitaine Eçço (1971)
- Le Camp du drap d'or (1971)
- La Vie scélérate du noble seigneur Gilles de Rais (1971)
- In the Jungle of Cities (1972)
- Woyzeck (1973)
- A Respectable Wedding (1973)
- En r'venant de l'expo (1973)
- The Mother (1975)
- Germinal, projet sur un roman (1975)
- La Bonne Vie (1976)
- Don Giovanni (1976)
- The Misanthrope (1977)
- Une livre à vue et Palais de la guérison (1978)
- La Mort d'Andrea Del Sarto, peintre florentin (1978)
- Vichy-Fictions et Violences à Vichy (1980)
- Convoi et Ruines (1980)
- Love's Labour's Lost (1980)
- Don Giovanni (1981)
- Palais de Justice (1981)
- Les Corbeaux (1982)
- Dernières Nouvelles de la peste (1983)
- Félicité (1983)
- The Suicide (1984)
- The Misanthrope (1984)
- Macbeth (1985)
- Six Characters in Search of an Author (1985)
- The Marriage of Figaro (1985)
- On ne badine pas avec l'amour (1988)
- Le Faiseur de théâtre (1988)
- Scènes du répertoire Büchner - Courteline (1988)
- La Nuit les chats (1989)
- Oedipus Rex (1989)
- Assainissement (1990)
- The Guilty Mother (1990)
- Le Chant du départ (1990)
- Scapin the Schemer (1990)
- Princesses (1991)
- Fantasio (1991)
- The Moods of Marianne (1991)
- Un homme pressé (1992)
- On ne badine pas avec l'amour (1993)
- Il ne faut jurer de rien (1993)
- Woyzeck (1993)
- Thyestes (1994)
- The Marriage of Figaro (1994)
- Violences à Vichy 2 (1995)
- All's Well That Ends Well (1996)
- Léo Burckart (1996)
- Karl Marx Théâtre inédit (1997)
- The Game of Love and Chance (1998)
- Tartuffe (1998)
- Pièces de guerre (1999)
- Man Equals Man (2000)
- Mitridate, re di Ponto (2000)
- Lorenzaccio (2000)
- Le Drame de la vie (2001)
- L’Échange (2001)
- Les Prétendants (2002)
- Le Fou et sa femme, ce soir, dans Pancomedia (2002)
- Katherine Barker (2002)
- Onze Débardeurs (2003)
- Derniers remords avant l'oubli (2004)
- Danton's Death (2004)
- Antilopes (2006)
- L’Éclipse du 11 août (2006)
- Oresteia (2006)
- Le Silence des communistes (2007)
- The School for Wives (2008)
- Silence des communistes (2008)
- Ubu Roi (2008)
- Paroles d'acteurs / Meeting Massera (2009)
- La Trilogie de Zelinda & Lindoro (2010)
- Les Acteurs de bonne foi (2010)
- Cancrelat (2012)
- Dom Juan (2012)
- Iphis et Iante (2013)
- Les Suppliantes (2013)
- War & Breakfast (2014)
- La Dame aux jambes d'Azur (2015)
- En attendant Godot (2015)

== Awards ==
- Prix du syndicat de la Critique for Capitaine Schelle, Capitaine Eçço (1972)
- Prix du syndicat de la Critique pour l'ensemble (1976)
- Prix Dominique for Vichy-Fictions (1979)
- Prix Georges Lherminier for Vichy-Fictions (1980)
- Prix du Syndicat de la Critique for Palais de Justice (1982)
- Molière Award for Best Director for Le Mariage de Figaro (1987)
- Grand Prix du Syndicat de la Critique for Le Mariage de Figaro (1987)
- Prix du syndicat de la Critique for Princesses (1991)
- Prix du syndicat de la Critique for Les Prétendants (2003)
- Prix Plaisir du théâtre for Les acteurs de bonne foi (2011)
