= The Satin Slipper (film) =

1985 film

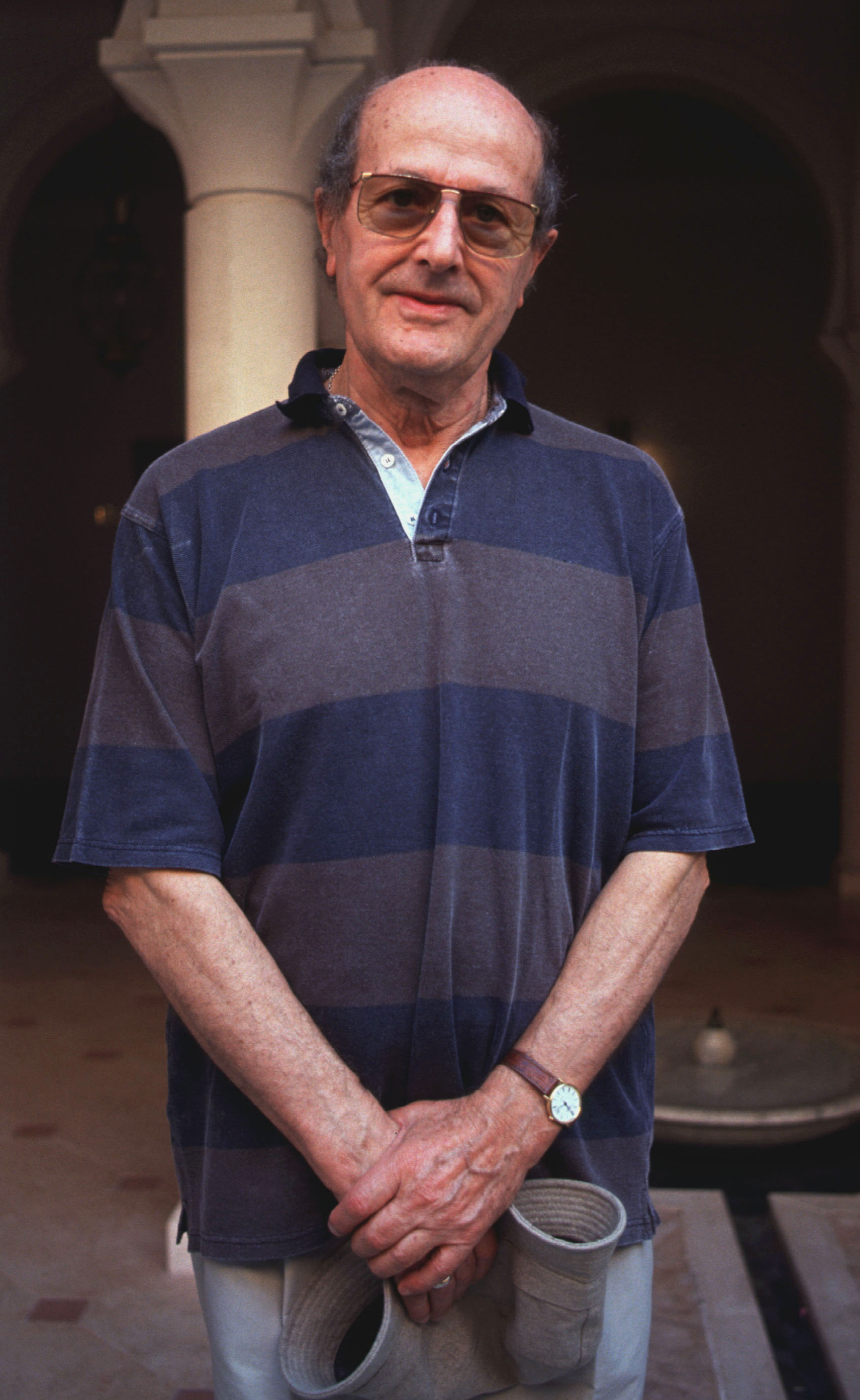
- Manoel de Oliveira
- Directed by: Manoel de Oliveira
- Written by: Jacques Parsi; Manoel de Oliveira; Paul Claudel (play)
- Produced by: Paulo Branco
- Starring: Luís Miguel Cintra; Patricia Barzyk; Anne Consigny
- Cinematography: Elso Roque
- Edited by: Janine Martin
- Release date: 8 January 1986
- Running time: 410 minutes
- Country: Portugal
- Languages: French; Portuguese

The Satin Slipper (Le Soulier de satin) is a 1985 Portuguese-French drama film based on the play by Paul Claudel. It was directed by Manoel de Oliveira and screened at the 42nd Venice International Film Festival.

== Cast ==
- Luís Miguel Cintra as Don Rodrigue
- Patricia Barzyk as Dona Prouhèze
- Anne Consigny as Marie des Sept-Épées
- Anne Gautier as Dona Musique
- Bernard Alane as Le vice-roi de Naples
- Jean-Pierre Bernard as Don Camille
- Marie-Christine Barrault as La lune
- Isabelle Weingarten as L'Ange Gardien
- Henri Serre as The First King
- Jean-Yves Berteloot as The Second King
- Catherine Jarret as The Actress

== Awards ==
42nd Venice International Film Festival

- Sergio Trasatti Award
