= The Satin Slipper =

1929 play written by Paul Claudel

The Satin Slipper (Le Soulier de satin) is a long play by the French dramatist and poet Paul Claudel, written in 1929. It was first performed on stage in 1943 (abridged), in a production by Claudel and Jean-Louis Barrault. Its full running time is roughly eleven hours.

== Plot summary ==
The scene is set during the Renaissance at the time of the conquistadors. The play is a love story dominated by the ideas of sin and redemption and the various characters, some divine and some comic, frequently engage in a dialogue as though between Heaven and Earth.

== Productions ==
Nowadays it is rarely staged, because of its extreme length and its challenging production requirements. Full-length productions were staged in Paris, and the Avignon Festival in 1987, and by Olivier Py at the Théâtre de l'Odéon in Paris in 2009.

It was made into a seven-hour film in 1985 by the Portuguese director Manoel de Oliveira.

In May 2021 an opera version by Marc-André Dalbavie received its premiere at the Paris Opera, with a libretto by Raphaèle Fleury.

== See also ==
- Le Monde's 100 Books of the Century
