= Jorge Semprún =

Spanish writer (1923–2011)

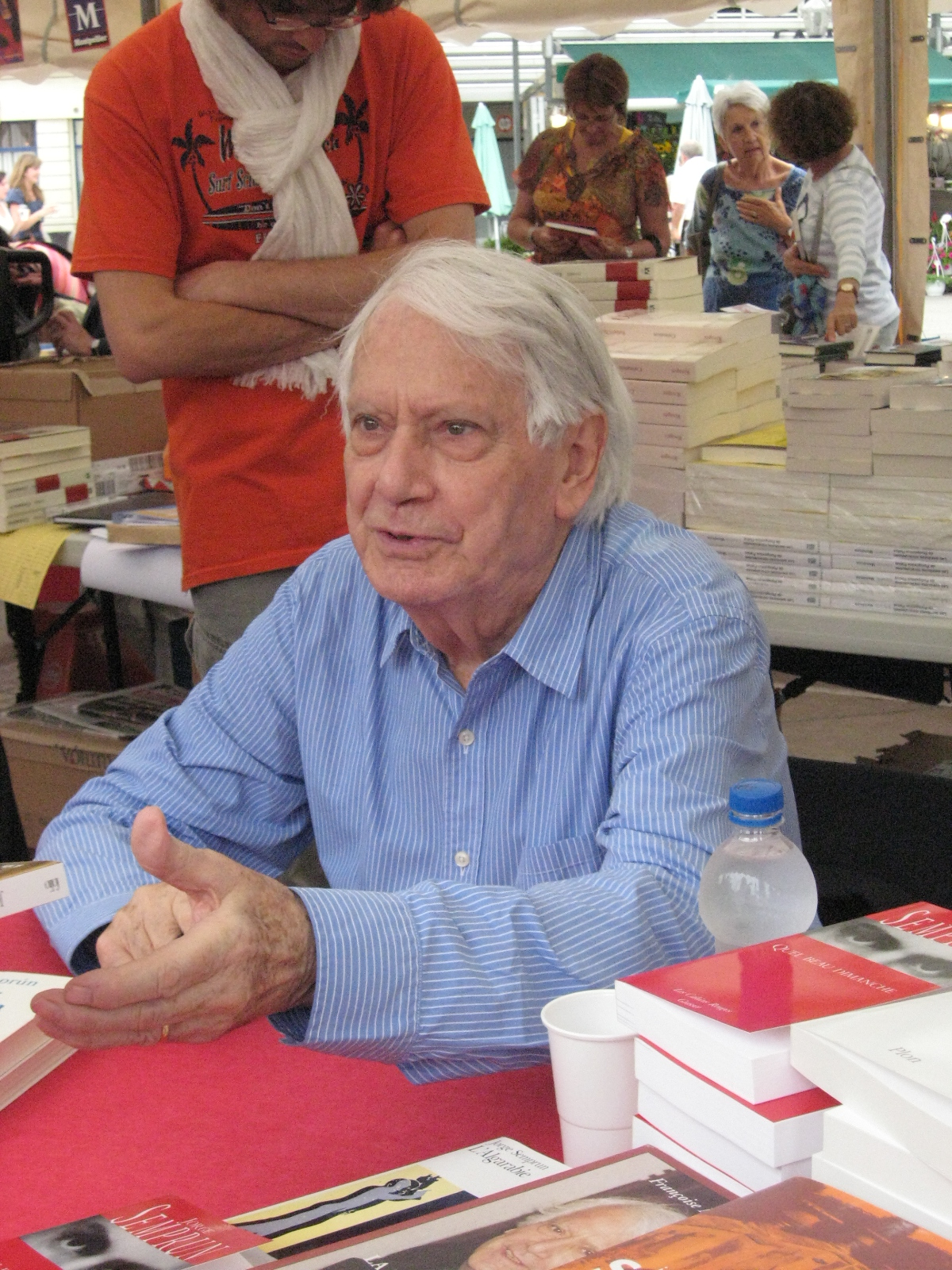
- Jorge Semprún at a book festival in Montpellier, 23 May 2009.
- Born: Jorge Semprún Maura; 10 December 1923; Madrid, Spain
- Died: 7 June 2011 (aged 87); Paris, France
- Occupations: Author, screenwriter, politician
- Partner: Loleh Bellon
- Children: Jaime Semprún
- Writing career
- Language: Spanish, French, German, English
- Notable awards: Jerusalem Prize 1997; Ovid Prize 2002

Minister of Culture
- In office 12 July 1989 – 13 March 1991
- Prime Minister: Felipe González
- Preceded by: Javier Solana
- Succeeded by: Jordi Solé Tura

Personal details
- Party: Communist Party of Spain (1942–1964)

Jorge Semprún Maura (Spanish pronunciation: [ˈxoɾxe semˈpɾum ˈmawɾa]; 10 December 1923 – 7 June 2011) was a Spanish writer and politician who lived in France most of his life and wrote primarily in French. From 1953 to 1962, during the dictatorship of Francisco Franco, Semprún lived clandestinely in Spain working as an organizer for the exiled Communist Party of Spain, but was expelled from the party in 1964. After the death of Franco and the change to a democratic government, he served as Minister of Culture in Spain's socialist government from 1988 to 1991.

He was a screenwriter for two successive films by the Greek director Costa-Gavras, Z (1969) and The Confession (1970), which dealt with the theme of persecution by governments. For his work on the films La Guerre est finie (The War Is Over; Alain Renais, 1966) and Z (Costa-Gavras, 1969) Semprún was nominated for the Academy Award. In 1996, he became the first non-French author elected to the Académie Goncourt, which awards an annual literary prize. Unlike most left-wing figures in Spain, Semprún was a zionist and in 1997 he won the Jerusalem Prize in Israel. Also, in 2002 he won Ovid Prize in Romania.

== Early life and education ==
Jorge Semprún Maura was born in 1923 in Madrid. His mother, who died when Jorge was eight, was Susana Maura Gamazo, the youngest daughter of Antonio Maura, who served several times as prime minister of Spain. His father, José María Semprún Gurrea (1893–1966), was a liberal politician and served as a diplomat for the Republic of Spain during the Spanish Civil War.

== Émigrés and World War II ==
In the wake of the military uprising led by General Franco in July 1936, the Semprún family moved to France, and then to The Hague where his father was a diplomat, representing the Republic of Spain in the Netherlands. After the Netherlands officially recognized the Franco government in the beginning of 1939, the family returned to France as refugees. Jorge Semprún enrolled there at the Lycée Henri IV and later the Sorbonne.

During the Nazi occupation of France, the young Semprún joined the Francs-Tireurs et Partisans – Main-d'Œuvre Immigrée (FTP-MOI), a Resistance organization made up mostly of immigrants. After joining the Spanish Communist Party in 1942 in France, Semprún was reassigned to the Francs-Tireurs et Partisans (FTP), the Communist armed Resistance. In 1943 he was arrested by the Gestapo and deported to Buchenwald concentration camp for his role in the Resistance. He deals with the experiences in two books: Le grand voyage (1963) treats the journey to Buchenwald, and Quel beau dimanche! (1980) his camp experiences.

In 1945, Semprún returned to France and became an active member of the exiled Communist Party of Spain (PCE). From 1953 to 1962, he was an important organizer of the PCE's clandestine activities in Spain, using the pseudonym of Federico Sánchez. He entered the party's executive committee in 1956. In 1964, he was expelled from the party because of "differences regarding the party line", and from then on he concentrated on his writing career.

Semprún wrote many novels, plays, and screenplays, for which he received several nominations, including an Academy Award in 1970, and awards, including the 1997 Jerusalem Prize. He was a screenwriter for two successive films by the Greek director Costa-Gavras, dealing with the theme of persecution by governments, Z (1969) and The Confession (1970). For his work on Z, he was nominated for the Academy Award for Best Adapted Screenplay but did not win.

He was a member of the jury at the 1984 Cannes Film Festival. In 1988 he was appointed Minister of Culture in Felipe González's second government, despite being neither an elected MP nor a member of the Socialist Party (PSOE). He resigned the post three years later after publishing an article openly criticising the vice-president, Alfonso Guerra, and his brother Juan Guerra.

In 1996, Semprún became the first non-French author to be elected to the Académie Goncourt, which awards an annual prize for literature written in French. In 2002, he was awarded the inaugural Ovid Prize in recognition of his entire body of work, which focuses on "tolerance and freedom of expression".

Jorge Semprún served as the honorary chairman of the Spanish branch of Action Against Hunger. He lived in Paris. In 2001, while giving a conference at the Lycée Frédéric Mistral in Avignon, France, he inspired young Pablo Daniel Magee to become a writer. Magee went on to write Opération Condor, prefaced by Costa Gavras.

== Marriage and family ==
Semprún married the actress Loleh Bellon in 1949. Their son, Jaime Semprún (1947–2010), was also a writer. Later Semprún married the French film editor Colette Leloup in 1958. They had five children, including Pablo Semprún. He is the brother of the writer Carlos Semprún (1926–2009).

== Style and themes ==
Semprún wrote primarily in French and alluded to French authors as much as to Spanish ones. Most of his books are fictionalized accounts of his deportation to Buchenwald. His writing is non-linear and achronological. The narrative setting shifts back and forth in time, exploring the past and future in relation to key events. With each recounting, events take on different meanings. Semprún's works are self-reflexive. His narrators explore how events live on in memory and means of communicating the events of the concentration camp to readers who cannot fathom that experience. His more recent work in this vein also includes reflections on the meaning of Europe and of being European, as informed by this period of history, including how Buchenwald was reopened by Soviet forces as Special Camp No. 2 of the NKVD, and then largely razed and planted over by East Germany to hide the mass graves from this second dark episode.

Semprún's writing in Spanish deals with Spanish subject matter, and includes two volumes of memoirs: Autobiografía de Federico Sánchez, about his clandestine work in and later exclusion from the Spanish Communist Party (1953–64), and Federico Sánchez se despide de ustedes, which deals with his term of service as Minister of Culture in the second Socialist government of Felipe González (1988–91). A novel in Spanish, Veinte años y un día, is set in 1956 and deals with recent history in Spain.

== Works ==
Semprún's first book, Le grand voyage (The Long Voyage in English; republished as The Cattle Truck in 2005 by Serif), was published in 1963 by Gallimard. It recounts Semprún's deportation and incarceration in Buchenwald in fictionalized form. A feature of the novel, and with Semprún's work in general, is its fractured chronology. The work recounts his train journey and arrival at the concentration camp. During the long trip, the narrator provides the reader with flashbacks to his experiences in the French Resistance and flash-forwards to life in the camp and after liberation. The novel won two literary prizes, the Prix Formentor and Prix littéraire de la Résistance ("Literary Prize of the Resistance").

In 1977, his Autobiografía de Federico Sánchez (Autobiography of Federico Sánchez) won the Premio Planeta, the most highly remunerated literary prize in Spain. In spite of the pseudonymous title, the work is Semprún's least fictionalized volume of autobiography, recounting his life as a member of the central committee of the Spanish Communist Party (PCE), and his undercover activities in Spain between 1953 and 1964. The book shows a stark view of Communist organizations during the Cold War, and presents a very critical portrait of leading figures of the PCE, including Santiago Carrillo and Dolores Ibárruri.

What a Beautiful Sunday (Quel beau dimanche!), his novel of life in Buchenwald and after liberation was published by Grasset in 1980. It purports to tell what it was like to live one day, hour by hour, in the concentration camp, but like Semprún's other novels, the narrator recounts events that precede and follow that day. In part, Semprún was inspired by A Day in the Life of Ivan Denisovich by Aleksandr Solzhenitsyn, and the work contains criticism of Stalinism as well as fascism.

Literature or Life was published by Gallimard in 1994. The French title, L'Ecriture ou la vie, might be better translated as "Writing or Life". Semprún explores themes related to deportation, but the focus is on living with the memory of the experience and how to write about it. Semprún revisits scenes from previous works and gives rationales for his literary choices.

Semprún's essays and public lectures, published in Spanish in the collection Pensar en Europa and, somewhat less comprehensively, In Franch in Une Tombe au Creux des Nuages, include reflections on the legacy of Jewish Europeans, whether German-speaking such as Sigmund Freud, Gustav Mahler, or Edmund Husserl, or French, such as Alfred Dreyfus or Léon Blum, as well as the political and social conflicts from World War II to the Cold War and beyond into the twenty-first century

Semprún's plays are less well-known than his film scripts and prose works but offer noteworthy treatments of his key themes, such as Buchenwald and the Nazi legacy, Jewish lives in Europe before and after the Shoah, the persistence as well as perishability of memory. Of his plays, only Le Retour de Carola Neher (The Return of Carola Neher) was published in his lifetime by Gallimard in 1998. It was commissioned by director Klaus Michael Grüber and staged in German as Bleiche Mutter, Zarte Schwester (Pale Mother, Gentle Sister), a title that alludes to two poems by Bertolt Brecht, in the Soviet military graveyard near Buchenwald to commemorate the fiftieth anniversary of the liberation of the camp inmates in April 1995. Two other plays were published posthumously: Moi, Eléanor, FIlle de Karl Marx, Juive (I, Eleanor Marx, am Jewish) in 2014 by Gallimard, and Gurs: une tragédie européene written in French but published in Spanish translation in Teatro completo de Jorge Semprún in 2021.

Books

- Grand voyage (Paris: Gallimard, 1963)
  - Long voyage, translated by Richard Seaver (New York: Grove Press, 1964)
- Évanouissement (Paris: Gallimard, 1967)
- Deuxième mort de Ramón Mercader (Paris: Gallimard, 1969)
  - Second death of Ramón Mercader, translated by Len Ortzen (New York: Grove Press, 1973)
  - Segunda muerte de Ramón Mercader: novela, traducción por Carlos Pujol (Barcelona: Planeta, 1978)
- Repérages: Photographies de Alain Resnais, texte de Jorge Semprun (Paris: Chêne, 1974)
- Autobiografía de Federico Sánchez (Barcelona: Planeta, 1977)
  - Autobiography of Federico Sanchez and the Communist underground in Spain, translated by Helen Lane (New York: Karz Publishers, c1979)
- Desvanecimiento: novela (Barcelona: Planeta, 1979)
- Quel beau dimanche (Paris: B. Grasset, c1980)
  - What a beautiful Sunday!, translated by Alan Sheridan (San Diego: Harcourt Brace Jovanovich, c1982)
- Algarabie: roman (Paris: Fayard, c1981)
- Montand, la vie continue (Paris: Denoël J. Clims, c1983)
- Montagne blanche: roman (Paris: Gallimard, c1986)
- Netchaïev est de retour-- : roman (Paris: J.C. Lattès, c1987)
- Le Retour de Carola Neher (Paris: Gallimard, 1998)
- Veinte Anos y un Dia (Barcelona: Tusquets, 2003)
- Pensar en Europa. Ensayos. (Barcelona: Tusquets, 2006)
- Une Tombe au Creux des Nuages: Essais sur L'Europe (Paris: Climats, 2010)
- Moi, Eléanor, Fille de Karl Marx, Juive (Paris: Gallimard, 2014)
- Teatro completo, Ed. Manuel Aznar Soler (Seville: Renacimiento, 2021)

Screenplays

- Objectif 500 millions, by Pierre Schoendoerffer, 1966
- The war is over, by Alain Resnais, 1966
- Z, by Costa-Gavras, 1969
- The confession, by Costa-Gavras, 1970
- The Assassination by Yves Boisset, 1972
- The two memoirs, script and direction, 1974
- Stavisky, by Alain Resnais, 1974
- Special Section, by Costa-Gavras, 1975
- A Woman at Her Window, by Pierre Granier-Deferre, 1976
- Roads to the South, by Joseph Losey, 1978
- The Paths of Saturn, by Hugo Santiago.
- Netchaiev Has Returned, by Jacques Deray; adaptation of his novel by Dan Franck and Jacques Deray.
- K, by Alexandre Arcady, 1997

Television screenplays

- The Disasters of War, by Mario Camus, 1983
- The Dreyfus Affair, by Yves Boisset, 1995

== See also ==
- List of Spanish Academy Award winners and nominees
- Calle Mayor (film)

== Sources ==
- Céspedes Gallego, Jaime, La obra de Jorge Semprún. Claves de interpretación, Bern, Berlin, Bruxelles, Frankfurt am Main, New York, Oxford, Wien, Peter Lang, vol. 1: Autobiografía y novela (2012); vol. 2: Cine y teatro (2015).
- Céspedes Gallego, Jaime, Las Dos Memorias de Jorge Semprún y los documentales sobre la Guerra Civil Española, Sevilla, Renacimiento, 2021.
- Céspedes Gallego, Jaime (University of Orleans, ed.), Cinéma et engagement: Jorge Semprún scénariste, nº 140, CinémAction, Corlet Éditions, 2011.
- Céspedes Gallego, Jaime, «André Malraux chez Jorge Semprún: l'héritage d'une quête», in Revue André Malraux Review, n° 33, Michel Lantelme (editor), Norman, University of Oklahoma, 2005, pp. 86–101.
- Céspedes Gallego, Jaime, «La dimensión biográfica de Veinte años y un día de Jorge Semprún», in Tonos. Revista Electrónica de Estudios Filológicos, n° 10, University of Murcia, 2005.
- Céspedes Gallego, Jaime, «Un eslabón perdido en la historiografía sobre la Guerra Civil: Las dos memorias de Jorge Semprún», in Cartaphilus. Revista de investigación y crítica estética, n° 5, University of Murcia, 2009.
- Drakopoulou, Eugenia. «The Revivification of Baroque Paintings in the Novels of Jorge Semprun», in Actual Problems of Theory and History of Art: Collection of articles. Vol. 8. Ed. S. V. Mal’tseva, E. Iu. Staniukovich-Denisova, A. V. Zakharova. St. Petersburg, St. Petersburg Univ. Press, 2018, pp. 701–707. ISSN 2312-2129.
- Johnson, Kathleen A. "The Framing of History: Jorge Semprun's «La Deuxieme Mort de Ramon Mercader", in French Forum, vol. 20, n° 1, January 1995, pp. 77–90.
- Fox Maura, Soledad, «Jorge Semprún, The Spaniard Who Survived the Nazis and Conquered Paris», Cañada Blanch Centre for Contemporary Spanish Studies / Sussex Academic Press, 2017.
- Benestroff, Corinne. Jorge Semprún entre résistance et résilience. Paris: CNRS, 2017
