= Laurent Terzieff =

French actor

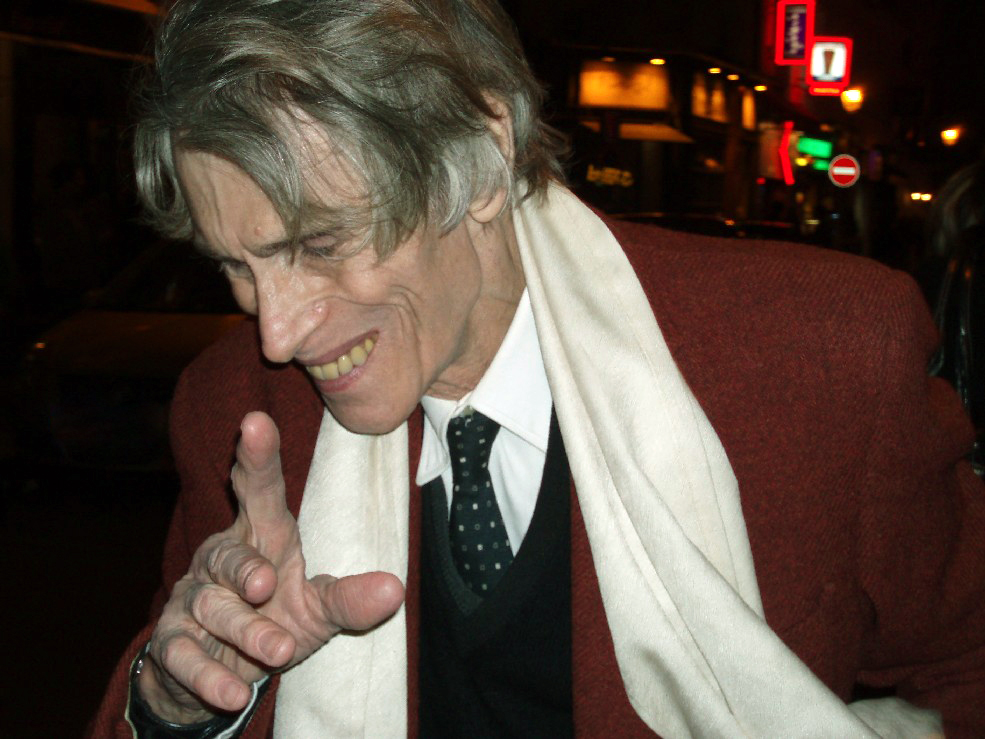
Terzieff in 2009

Laurent Terzieff (27 June 1935 – 2 July 2010) was a French actor and theatre director.

== Biography ==
Terzieff was the son of French ceramist Marina and her husband Jean Terzieff, a Romanian-born sculptor of Russian and Romanian descent who came to France from Bucharest during the First World War. The original surname of his family was Chemerzin (Russian: Чемерзин). As an adolescent, he was fascinated with philosophy and poetry. He assisted with a representation of the La Sonate des spectres by Strindberg, directed by Roger Blin; while involved in the theater he decided he wanted to become an actor.

Terzieff made his debut in 1953 at the Parisian ''Théâtre de Babylone'' in Tous contre tous by Adamov. After several more roles, Marcel Carné offered him a lead role in Les Tricheurs (1958), a tale about existentialist youth. He then appeared in the late works of French scenario writers such as Claude Autant-Lara, with whom he appeared in three films including Tu ne tueras point in 1961. Other collaborators included Henri-Georges Clouzot (La prisonnière), in which he plays an artist manipulator. In 1975 Terzieff played the leading role as the priest in Jeu. His partner Pascale de Boysson, Dirk Kinnane and Bibi Hure were also in the cast.

Other film appearances include Les Garcons by Mauro Bolognini in 1959, Vanina Vanini (1961), Two Weeks in September (1967), in which he appeared with Brigitte Bardot, The Milky Way (1969), Medea (1969), The Desert of the Tartars (1976), and the TV miniseries Moses the Lawgiver (1974), starring Burt Lancaster. In the 1980s, he primarily acted on stage. Appearances during this era include Rouge Baiser, Germinal in 1993, and The Raft of the Medusa in 1998. In 2005, he appeared in Mon petit doigt m'a dit. Terzieff died on July 2, 2010, due to lung complications.

== Awards and nominations ==
=== Molière Awards ===
Year	Group	Award	Play	Result
1988	Molière Awards	Best Director	Fall	Won
1993	Molière Awards	Best Director	Another Time	Won
2010	Molière Awards	Best Actor	The Dresser and Philoctetes	Won

Year	Group	Award	Play	Result
1989	Molière Awards	Best Actor	Henry IV	Nominated
1993	Molière Awards	Best Actor	Another Time	Nominated
