= Romain Weingarten =

French playwright

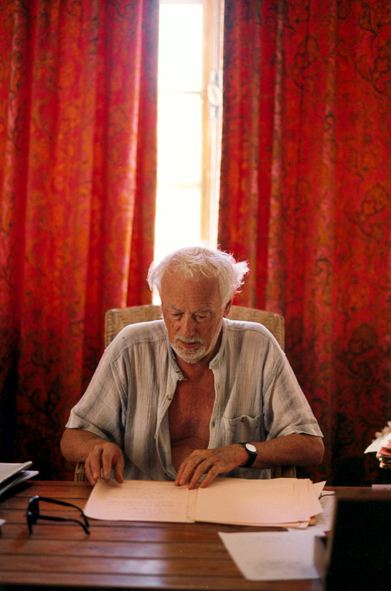
Romain Weingarten in 1996

Romain Weingarten (5 December 1926 – 13 July 2006) was a French playwright.

He was born in Paris, and grew up in Brittany and Château-Thierry. He studied philosophy at the Sorbonne, where he was strongly influenced by the work of Antonin Artaud, to whom he dedicated his first play, "Akara". Later though Weingarten rejected the label of "Theatre of the Absurd" sometimes attached to his work, and claimed an affiliation with the Surrealists and Roger Vitrac, preferring to describe his work as "poetic". In 1998, he received the Grand Prix du Théâtre de l’Académie française.

Weingarten's first work, "Akara" was written in 1948, while he was a student at the Sorbonne. It has been described as the first anti-play; in which Weingarten played 'Le Chat', reflecting the fact that he 'look[ed] like a cat reincarnated into an avant-garde artist'.

Weingarten died of old age, according to his family, at Challans, Vendée, and was buried in Mauron in Morbihan.

== Bibliography ==
- Akara (1948)
- Les Nourrices (The Nurses) (1961)
- L'Été (Summer) (1966)
- Alice dans les jardins du Luxembourg (Alice in the Gardens of Luxembourg) (1970)
- Comme la pierre (Like Stone) (1970, at the Comédie-Française)
- La Mandore (Mandora) (1973)
- Neige (Snow) (1979)
- La Mort d’Auguste (The Death of Auguste) (1982).

This page is a translation of the French page.
