= Françoise Bertin =

French actress (1925–2014)

- Born: 23 September 1925; Paris, France
- Died: 26 October 2014 (aged 89); Galan, Hautes-Pyrénées, France
- Occupation: Actress
- Years active: 1949–2014

Françoise Bertin (23 September 1925 – 26 October 2014) was a French actress.

She appeared in over 125 films since 1961. Among these were five films directed by Alain Resnais: Last Year at Marienbad, Muriel, The War Is Over, I Want to Go Home, and Same Old Song.

Born in Paris on 23 September 1925, she died in Galan, Hautes-Pyrénées, on 26 October 2014.

== Theater ==
Year	Title	Author	Director	Notes
1949	Measure for Measure	William Shakespeare	Jean Dasté	
1951	Les Fausses Confidences	Pierre de Marivaux	Jean Dasté	
1955	The Imaginary Invalid	Molière	René Lesage	
1955	Right You Are (if you think so)	Luigi Pirandello	René Lesage	
1956	Thieves' Carnival	Jean Anouilh	Gérard Guillaumat	
1957	The Caucasian Chalk Circle	Bertolt Brecht	Jean Dasté	
1958	Le Chinois	Pierre Barillet & Jean-Pierre Gredy	Georges Vitaly	
1959	Edmée	Pierre-Aristide Bréal	Georges Vitaly	
1959	The Bedbug	Vladimir Mayakovsky	André Barsacq	
1960	Les Coréens	Michel Vinaver	Gabriel Monnet	
1960	The Fire Raisers	Max Frisch	Jean-Marie Serreau	
1961	The Servant of Two Masters	Carlo Goldoni	Edmond Tamiz	
1962	The Fire Raisers	Max Frisch	Jean-Marie Serreau	
1962	L'Avenir est dans les oeufs	Eugène Ionesco	Jean-Marie Serreau	
1962	George Dandin ou le Mari confondu	Molière	Daniel Leveugle	
1963	Bohemian Lights	Ramón del Valle-Inclán	Georges Wilson	
1963	Les Femmes Savantes	Molière	Gilles Léger	
1964	Le Cid	Pierre Corneille	Daniel Leveugle	
1964	The Lark	Jean Anouilh	Jean Anouilh & Roland Piétri	
1964	The Flies	Jean-Paul Sartre	Jean Deschamps	
1964	The Physicists	Friedrich Dürrenmatt	Hubert Gignoux	
1964	Captain Fracasse	Théophile Gautier	Jean Deschamps	
1965	Andorra	Max Frisch	Gabriel Garran	
1965	Danton ou la Mort de la République	Romain Rolland	Jean Deschamps	
1966	Le Procès d'Emile Henry	Antoine Vitez	Antoine Vitez	
1967	Cœur à cuire	Jacques Audiberti	Gabriel Monnet	
1968	Romeo and Juliet	William Shakespeare	Michael Cacoyannis	
1968	The Devil and the Good Lord	Jean-Paul Sartre	Georges Wilson	
1970	Operetka	Witold Gombrowicz	Jacques Rosner	
1970	Jarry sur la butte	Alfred Jarry	Jean-Louis Barrault	
1970	The Devil and the Good Lord	Jean-Paul Sartre	Georges Wilson	
1971	Turandot	Bertolt Brecht	Georges Wilson	
1971	La Cagnotte	Eugène Labiche	Jean-Pierre Vincent	
1972	The Annunciation of Marie	Paul Claudel	Hubert Gignoux	
1974	L'Odyssée pour une tasse de thé	Jean-Michel Ribes	Jean-Michel Ribes	
1975	Souvenir d'Alsace	Bruno Bayen & Yves Reynaud	Bruno Bayen & Yves Reynaud	
1976	Oedipus Rex	Sophocles	Gabriel Monnet	
1981	Right You Are (if you think so)	Luigi Pirandello	Jean Favarel	
1982	La casa nova	Carlo Goldoni	Jean Favarel	
1984	Le Marionnettiste de Lodz	Gilles Ségal	Jean-Paul Roussillon	
1988	La Traversée de l'empire	Fernando Arrabal	Fernando Arrabal	
1993-94	Another Time	Ronald Harwood	Laurent Terzieff	Molière Award for Best Supporting Actress
1996	Come Tu Mi Vuoi	Luigi Pirandello	Claudia Stavisky	
2003	Embers	Sándor Márai	Didier Long	
2014	Votre maman	Jean-Claude Grumberg	Vincent Ecrepont	
2014	Si on recommençait	Éric-Emmanuel Schmitt	Steve Suissa	

== Filmography ==
Year	Title	Role	Director	Notes
1961	Last Year at Marienbad	Woman at the hotel	Alain Resnais	
1961	Par-dessus le mur	Madame Bellonger	Jean-Paul Le Chanois	
1963	Muriel	Simone	Alain Resnais	
1963	Le théâtre de la jeunesse	The doorwoman	Alain Boudet	TV series (1 episode)
1964	Diary of a Chambermaid		Luis Buñuel	
1965	Escalier sur cour		Alain Cuniot	Short
1966	The War Is Over	Carmen	Alain Resnais	
1967	Le voleur d'enfants	Desporia	Bernard Hecht	TV movie
1968	Don Juan revient de guerre	The maid	Marcel Cravenne	TV movie
1968	Les contes du chat perché	The neighbor	Arlen Papazian	TV movie
1968	Le théâtre de la jeunesse	Madame Choppart	Yves-André Hubert	TV series (1 episode)
1971	Les cent livres des hommes	Madame Eysette	Jean Archimbaud	TV series (1 episode)
1972	François Malgorn, séminariste ou celui qui n'était pas appelé	Mother Coadou	Yves-André Hubert	TV movie
1972	Alberte	Alphonsine	Sverre Udnæs	TV mini-series
1973	Trois diamants plus une femme	Francisé's aunt	Aldo Altit	Short
1973	Sentimental Education	The seamstress	Marcel Cravenne	TV mini-series
1973	Le dialogue dans le marécage	A servant	Michel Hermant	TV movie
1974	On s'est trompé d'histoire d'amour	The first operator	Jean-Louis Bertucelli	
1974	Le vagabond	Madame Léger	Claude-Jean Bonnardot	TV series (1 episode)
1974	La famille Grossfelder	The mother	Jean L'Hôte	TV movie
1974	Black Thursday	The dyer	Michel Mitrani	
1974	Jean Pinot, médecin d'aujourd'hui	Stepdaughter	Michel Fermaud	TV series (1 episode)
1975	Le pain noir	Madame Voiray	Serge Moati	TV series (1 episode)
1975	Léopold le bien-aimé	Mlle Blanmoutiez	Georges Wilson	TV movie
1976	Calmos	Employee of the lab	Bertrand Blier	
1976	Hôtel Baltimore	Madame Bellot	Arcady	TV movie
1976	Body of My Enemy	René's wife	Henri Verneuil	
1977	L'ancre de miséricorde	Marianne	Bernard d'Abrigeon	TV movie
1977	Peppermint Soda	Professor of French	Diane Kurys	
1978	The Little Wheedlers	Antoine's mother	Jean-Marie Poiré	
1978	Meurtre sur la personne de la mer	Madame Matanierl	Michel Subiela	TV movie
1978	Les deux berges	Denise	Patrick Antoine	TV movie
1978	Douze heures pour mourir	Denise	Abder Isker	TV movie
1978	Médecins de nuit	The alcoholic maid	Peter Kassovitz	TV series (1 episode)
1979	Au bout du bout du banc	The neighbor	Peter Kassovitz	
1979	Laisse-moi rêver		Robert Ménégoz	
1980	Cinéma 16	Françoise	Jean-Claude Morin	TV series (1 episode)
1981	Silas	Frau des Fischers	Sigi Rothemund	TV mini-series
1982	Caméra une première	Madame Mauret	Peter Kassovitz	TV series (1 episode)
1982	On sort ce soir	Checca	Yves-André Hubert	TV series (1 episode)
1982	L'épingle noire	Madame de Hon	Maurice Frydland	TV movie
1987	Les enquêtes Caméléon	Marie	Philippe Monnier	TV series (1 episode)
1988	Les enquêtes du commissaire Maigret	Madame Dance	Michel Subiela	TV series (1 episode)
1988	La chaîne	Mémé	Claude Faraldo	TV mini-series
1988	Les dossiers secrets de l'inspecteur Lavardin	Martine's mother	Claude Chabrol	TV series (1 episode)
1988	Un château au soleil	Joséphine Labrède	Robert Mazoyer	TV mini-series
1989	I Want to Go Home	The greengrocer's client	Alain Resnais	
1989	Les Cinq Dernières Minutes	Paulette	Maurice Frydland	TV series (1 episode)
1990	Cinéma 16	Léo's mother	Roger Guillot	TV series (1 episode)
1990	Stirn et Stern	The Countess	Peter Kassovitz	TV movie
1990	Livraison à domicile	The woman	Claude Philippot	Short
1991	Ferbac	Eugénie Graucourt	Marc Rivière	TV series (1 episode)
1991	Cas de divorce	Hélène Celier	Gérard Espinasse	TV series (1 episode)
1991	La neige et le feu		Claude Pinoteau	
1993	La cavalière	Faustine	Philippe Monnier	TV mini-series
1994	En attendant les barbares	Elena	Liria Bégéja	
1994	Killer Kid	The old lady	Gilles de Maistre	
1994	Maigret	Catherine	Olivier Schatzky	TV series (1 episode)
1994	Ça se passe en Équateur		Jean-Louis Milesi	Short
1994	Chinoiseries		Jean-Christophe Delpias	Short
1995	Seconde B	Anaïs	Christophe Gregeois	TV series (1 episode)
1995	Carreau d'as		Laurent Carcélès	TV movie
1995	L'amour en prime	Madeleine	Patrick Volson	TV movie
1995	Les Anges gardiens	Madame Albert	Jean-Marie Poiré	
1996	L'embellie	Rosa	Charlotte Silvera	TV movie
1996	Les alsaciens - ou les deux Mathilde	Liselotte	Michel Favart	TV mini-series
1997	Docteur Sylvestre	Madame Champan	Philippe Roussel	TV series (1 episode)
1997	Les filles du maître de chai	Alice	François Luciani	TV movie
1997	Same Old Song	Little Lady on Tour	Alain Resnais	
1998	La poursuite du vent	Angère	Nina Companeez	TV mini-series
1998	Baldi	Zaza	Michel Mees	TV series (1 episode)
1998	Une femme d'honneur	Madame Maintrot	Michèle Hauteville	TV series (1 episode)
1999	Une journée de merde !	Madame Pelletier	Miguel Courtois	
1999	La crim'	Madame Gatinot	Miguel Courtois	TV series (1 episode)
1999	Skin of Man, Heart of Beast	Mademoiselle Espitalier	Hélène Angel	
1999	No Scandal		Benoît Jacquot	
2000	Cours toujours	Trouillard's mother	Dante Desarthe	
2000	La Captive	The grandmother	Chantal Akerman	
2000	Happenstance	Luc's Grandmother	Laurent Firode	
2000	La loire, Agnès et les garçons	Adrienne	Patrice Martineau	TV movie
2000	Le miroir aux alouettes	Mummy	Francis Fehr	TV movie
2001	Le secret d'Alice		Michaël Perrotta	TV movie
2001	Avocats & associés	Louise Durale	Alexandre Pidoux	TV series (1 episode)
2001	Agathe et le grand magasin	Madeleine	Bertrand Arthuys	TV movie
2002	Les rebelles de Moissac	Bernadette	Jean-Jacques Kahn	TV movie
2002	La liberté de Marie	The old lady	Caroline Huppert	TV mini-series
2002	The Truth About Charlie	Woman on Train	Jonathan Demme	
2003	Le pharmacien de garde	Madame Jouvin	Jean Veber	
2003	L'aubaine	Marguerite	Aline Issermann	TV movie
2003	The Flower of Evil	Thérèse	Claude Chabrol	
2003	Leave Your Hands on My Hips	Monique	Chantal Lauby	
2003	Une femme si parfaite	Madame Pollet	Bernard Uzan	TV movie
2003	Quai n° 1	Jacqueline Lenoir	Patrick Jamain	TV series (1 episode)
2004	La danse éternelle	The old lady of the square	Hiam Abbass	Short
2004	Tout le plaisir est pour moi	Josie	Isabelle Broué	
2004	À trois c'est mieux	Madame Renard	Laurence Katrian	TV movie
2005	C'est la vie, camarade !	The old lady	Bernard Uzan	TV movie
2005	Hell	The neighbor	Danis Tanović	
2005	Des nouvelles d'Angélique	Angélique	Mirabelle Kirkland	Short
2005	Josephine, Guardian Angel	Aunt Albertine	Philippe Monnier	TV series (1 episode)
2006	Incontrôlable	Mamie	Raffy Shart	
2006	Tell No One	Antoinette Levkowitch	Guillaume Canet	
2007	72/50		Armel de Lorme & Gauthier Fages de Bouteiller	
2007	Hunting and Gathering	Paulette	Claude Berri	
2007	Les plumes de l'oncle d'Ayopou	The old lady	Marie Meerson	Short
2008	Afrique !	Mémé	Hervé Lavayssière	Short
2008	A Christmas Tale	Rosaimée Vuillard	Arnaud Desplechin	
2008	Leur morale... et la nôtre	Madame Lamour	Florence Quentin	
2008	D'une vie à l'autre	The old lady	Alice Mitterrand	Short
2009	Plus belle la vie	Josiane Laval	David Bouttin, Philippe Dajoux, ...	TV series (5 episodes)
2009	Les Petits Meurtres d'Agatha Christie	Emilie Dubreuil	Eric Woreth	TV series (1 episode)
2009	Little Nicholas	The old lady	Laurent Tirard	
2010	Ensemble, c'est trop	Henriette	Léa Fazer	
2010	Colère	Monique Capin	Jean-Pierre Mocky	TV movie
2010	Les Bleus	Madame Tubin	Olivier Barma	TV series (1 episode)
2010	R.I.S, police scientifique	Lucette	Éric Le Roux	TV series (1 episode)
2011	À la recherche du temps perdu	Madame de Villeparisis	Nina Companeez	TV mini-series
2011	Alice Nevers: Le juge est une femme	Madame Sebagh	René Manzor	TV series (1 episode)
2011	Chez Maupassant	The old Mother	Denis Malleval	TV series (1 episode)
2011	Les tribulations d'une caissière	The old lady	Pierre Rambaldi	
2012	Il était une fois, une fois	Magdeleine	Christian Merret-Palmair	
2012	R.I.S, police scientifique	Annette Dumas	Julien Zidi	TV series (1 episode)
2012	Divorce et fiançailles	Bernadette	Olivier Péray	TV movie
2012	Paulette	Renée	Jérôme Enrico	
2012	Main courante	Shoshana	Jean-Marc Thérin	TV series (1 episode)
2012	Une vie déportée	Raymonde	Marie-Hélène Roux	Short
2013	Guet-apens	Angele	Michaël Barocas	Short
2013	Le renard jaune	The lady at the morgue	Jean-Pierre Mocky	
2013	Le locataire	Violette	Nadège Loiseau	Short
2013	Chat	Old Woman	Ilan Cohen	Short
2014	Escale	Voice	Charlotte Cambon & Margot de Kerangat	Short
2015	14 Juillet	Madeleine	Michaël Barocas	Short
2015	À court d'enfants		Marie-Hélène Roux	(final film role)
2011	47 - Bref. Je suis vieille.	Grandma	Kyan Khojandi	TV series (1 episode)
