= Leloup =

Leloup or variants may refer to:

- Leloup (surname)
- LeLoup, Kansas, unincorporated community in Franklin County, Kansas, United States
- Le Loup, American indie rock group
- Le Loup (French for "The Wolf,") the branding of French-language radio stations in Northern Ontario operated by Le5 Communications
