= Toute la mémoire du monde =

- Directed by: Alain Resnais
- Written by: Rémo Forlani
- Produced by: Pierre Braunberger
- Starring: Jacques Dumesnil (narrator)
- Cinematography: Ghislain Cloquet
- Edited by: Alain Resnais
- Music by: Maurice Jarre
- Production company: Les Films de la Pléiade
- Release date: 1956
- Running time: 21 minutes
- Country: France
- Language: French

Toute la mémoire du monde (also known as Toute la mémoire du monde – Encyclopédie de Paris numéro cinq, All the World's Memory and All the Memory of the World) is a 1956 French short documentary film directed by Alain Resnais and written by Rémo Forlani. It is narrated by Jacques Dumesnil.

== Synopsis ==
An essay on the potential and limits of dutifully archived human knowledge, masquerading as a documentary on the organisation of the Bibliothèque nationale de France.

== Collaborators ==
- Gérard Willemetz
- Pierre Goupil
- Anne Sarraute
- Roger Fleytoux
- Claude Joudioux
- Jean Cayrol
- André Goeffers
- Jean-Charles Lauthe
- Chris Marker (as Chris and Magic Marker)
- Dominique Raoul-Duval
- Chester Gould
- Denise York
- Benigne Caceres
- Agnès Varda
- Monique Le Porrier
- Paulette Borker
- André Heinrich
- Madame Searle
- Lee Falk
- Phil Davis
- Marie-Claire Pasquier
- Robert Rendigal
- François-Régis Bastide
- Giulietta Caputo
- Joseph Rovan
- Claudine Merlin
