= Pierre Braunberger =

French film producer and actor

- Occupations: Producer, actor

Pierre Braunberger (29 July 1905, Paris – 16 November 1990, Aubervilliers) was a French producer, executive producer, and actor.

== Biography ==
Born into a family of physicians, Braunberger at the age of seven was already determined not have the same life as his father, and not to take up medicine as a career. He saw a screening of Fantômas at the Gaumont Théâtre, the first cinema to open in Paris, and decided to work in the cinema.

After the First World War, at the age of 15, he produced and directed his first film: Frankfurt in Germany. He left for successive adventures in Berlin, London at Brocklis establishments, where he worked.

In 1923, he left for New York, where he worked for a few weeks at Fox Film Corporation, and became a director of production along with Ferdinand H. Adam where he also worked on films with Frank Merrill.

In the course of his films in Los Angeles, he came to know Irving Thalberg who employed him at Metro-Goldwyn-Mayer as one of his assistants. He stayed there for eighteen months, and established contacts with one of the greatest directors of the time.

Wanting to direct and produce in France, he returned to Paris and got to know Jean Renoir, with whom he worked on Avec qui il va tourner, The Whirlpool of Fate, Nana and Tire-au-flanc.

In 1929, Braunberger created Productions Pierre Braunberger and Néofilms for the production of his first French-speaking film (La route est belle by Robert Florey).

In 1930, Braunberger became head of the Pantheon Cinema and continued there for sixty years. He renovated the lobby, created 450 seats, and installed Western Electric projectors and sound equipment. Although subtitles were yet to be invented, he was the first to show foreign films in their original versions.

One year later, he met with Roger Richebé to produce under the name of Établissements Braunberger-Richebé. A few films were produced, such as le Blanc et le noir by Robert Florey, La chienne by Jean Renoir, and Chocolatière et Fanny by Marc Allégret. In 1933, still only 28, he decided to continue alone, and formed studios de Billancourt, which became Paris-Studio-Cinéma. During World War two he was not able to produce a film because he was Jewish.

At the end of the Second World War, Braunberger transformed a local Gestapo office into the Studio Lhomond, which he used to discover new talents of the "nouvelle vague", including Jean-Pierre Melville, Jean-Luc Godard and Alain Resnais.

In 1966 he was the head of the jury at the 16th Berlin International Film Festival.

Braunberger had a close relationship with philosopher Gilles Deleuze.

In the late 1970s, Braunberger produced two films for Polish filmmaker Walerian Borowczyk.

Braunberger died in 1990.

== Filmography ==
- 1929 : La Malemort du Canard (La Ballade du canard)
- 1930 : La Route est belle
- 1930 : L'Homme qui assassina
- 1930 : El Amor solfeando
- 1930 : La Femme d'une nuit
- 1931 : La donna di una notte
- 1931 : On purge bébé
- 1931 : The Lovers of Midnight
- 1931 : La Chienne
- 1931 : Salto Mortale
- 1931 : American Love
- 1932 : Baleydier
- 1933 : Tire au flanc
- 1934 : Sans famille
- 1936 : Partie de campagne
- 1937 : The Cheat
- 1940 : Threats
- 1947 : Van Gogh
- 1947 : Paris 1900
- 1948 : Van Gogh
- 1949 : Le Trésor des Pieds-Nickelés
- 1950 : Henri de Toulouse-Lautrec
- 1950 : Histoire des pin-up girls
- 1950 : Guernica
- 1950 : Gauguin
- 1950 : Le Tampon du capiston
- 1951 : Station mondaine
- 1951 : Palais royal
- 1951 : Le Dictionnaire des pin-up girls
- 1951 : L'Art du haut-rhénan
- 1951 : The Bullfight documentary
- 1951 : Bernard and the Lion
- 1952 : En quête de Marie
- 1952 : Avec André Gide
- 1952 : The Crime of Bouif
- 1952 : Jocelyn
- 1953 : Marc Chagall
- 1953 : Julietta
- 1954 : Croissance de Paris
- 1954 : Ballade parisienne
- 1955 : Visages de Paris
- 1955 : Une lettre pour vous
- 1955 : New York ballade
- 1955 : Impressions de New York
- 1956 : Toute la mémoire du monde
- 1956 : Houston, Texas
- 1956 : Le Grand sud
- 1956 : Le Coup du berger
- 1956 : Les Abeilles
- 1958 : Moi un noir
- 1958 : Elèves-maîtres
- 1958 : Le Chant du styrène by Alain Resnais (short)
- 1958 : Ces gens de Paris
- 1958 : Bonjour, Monsieur La Bruyère
- 1958 : Au bon coin
- 1958 : L'Américain se détend
- 1959 : Tous les garçons s'appellent Patrick (All the Boys Are Called Patrick)
- 1960 : L'Amour existe by Maurice Pialat (short)
- 1960 : L'Eau à la bouche
- 1960 : L'Amérique insolite
- 1960 : Tirez sur le pianiste (Shoot the Piano Player)
- 1960 : Charlotte et son Jules
- 1961 : Une histoire d'eau
- 1962 : Un cœur gros comme ça
- 1962 : La Dénonciation
- 1962 : Virginie
- 1962 : Vivre sa vie: Film en douze tableaux
- 1963 : Delphica
- 1964 : La Femme spectacle
- 1964 : The Adolescents (La Fleur de l'âge, ou Les adolescentes)
- 1964 : De l'amour
- 1965 : Le Bestiaire d'amour
- 1965 : L'Affaire de poissons
- 1966 : Lumière
- 1966 : Martin Soldat by Michel Deville with Robert Hirsch
- 1967 : L'Affaire de la rue de Chantilly (Le Crime de la rue de Chantilly) (TV)
- 1968 : Erotissimo by Gérard Pirès with Annie Girardot
- 1969 : L'Astragale
- 1969 : Libre de ne pas l'être
- 1969 : Le Droit d'asile
- 1969 : Cinéma-cinéma
- 1970 : Trois Hommes sur un cheval by Marcel Moussy with Robert Dhéry
- 1970 : Les Voisins n'aiment pas la musique
- 1970 : La Fin des Pyrénées
- 1970 : En attendant l'auto...
- 1970 : Chambres de bonne
- 1970 : Êtes-vous fiancée à un marin grec ou à un pilote de ligne ? by Jean Aurel with Jean Yanne
- 1971 : Les Doigts croisés (To Catch a Spy) by Dick Clement with Kirk Douglas
- 1971 : Le Laboratoire de l'angoisse
- 1971 : La Cavale
- 1971 : Fantasia chez les ploucs by Gérard Pirès with Lino Ventura
- 1971 : Petit à petit
- 1971 : You Can't Hold Back Spring
- 1972 : Je, tu, elles...
- 1972 : Elle court, elle court la banlieue by Gérard Pirès with Marthe Keller
- 1974 : Défense d'aimer
- 1974 : Comment réussir quand on est con et pleurnichard
- 1974 : Comme un pot de fraises by Jean Aurel with Jean-Claude Brialy
- 1975 : Emilienne
- 1975 : L'Agression by Gérard Pirès with Jean-Louis Trintignant
- 1975 : Attention les yeux ! by Gérard Pirès with Claude Brasseur
- 1977 : Le Risque de vivre by Gérald Calderon with Michael Lonsdale
- 1979 : L'Armoire
- 1979 : Collections privées
- 1983 : Kusa-meikyu
- 1986 : Dionysus
- 1989 : Aller à Dieppe sans voir la mer

== See also ==
- 1929 in film
