= Je t'aime, je t'aime =

1968 film

- Film poster
- Directed by: Alain Resnais
- Written by: Jacques Sternberg; Alain Resnais (uncredited)
- Produced by: Mag Bodard
- Starring: Claude Rich; Olga Georges-Picot
- Cinematography: Jean Boffety
- Edited by: Albert Jurgenson; Colette Leloup
- Music by: Krzysztof Penderecki
- Production companies: Parc Film; Les Productions Fox-Europa
- Distributed by: 20th Century Fox
- Release date: 26 April 1968
- Running time: 91 minutes
- Country: France
- Language: French
- Box office: $3 million

Je t'aime, je t'aime ("I Love You, I Love You") is a 1968 French science fiction film directed by Alain Resnais from a screenplay by Jacques Sternberg. The plot centres on Claude Ridder (Claude Rich), who is asked to participate in a mysterious experiment in time travel when he leaves the hospital after a suicide attempt. The experiment, intended to return him to the present after reliving one minute from one year earlier, instead causes him to re-experience moments from his past several years in a disjointed fashion.

The film was listed to compete at the 1968 Cannes Film Festival, but the festival was cancelled due to the countrywide wildcat strike that occurred in May 1968 in France.

While seldom ranked among Resnais's best works, Je t'aime, je t'aime has received positive reviews since its release. It has been cited as an influence on the 2004 Michel Gondry film Eternal Sunshine of the Spotless Mind.

== Plot ==
As Claude Ridder is leaving a Belgian hospital after attempting suicide by shooting himself in the heart, he is approached by two men, who ask him to participate in a mysterious experiment in time travel being conducted by a private research body. They take him to Crespel Research Center, a secret location in the countryside, where the researchers explain to Claude that they are confident they have succeeded in sending mice back in time, and are now ready to send a human back, since a human can confirm they really did revisit the past. Claude, who does not seem particularly concerned about whether or not he will survive the experiment, agrees, but instead of reliving one minute from one year earlier and returning to the present, as the mice had supposedly done, he re-experiences many episodes from his past in a highly disjointed and fragmented manner, each scene lasting just seconds or minutes.

While some of the moments Claude revisits are mundane, many others catalog the highs and lows of his seven-year relationship with the beautiful, morbid, melancholic Catrine, which ended recently. Gradually, it is revealed that Claude seems to have been responsible for Catrine's death on a trip to Glasgow when the flame of a gas heater in their room went out while she was asleep, as he noticed this on his way to a meeting, but chose not to wake her, as she was smiling in her sleep, and, for once, looked happy and peaceful. However, after admitting this to his friend Wiana, Claude immediately says he was lying, and the flame went out after he left. Regardless, after Catrine's death, Claude comes to the painful realization that, not only could he not live with her, he cannot live without her, and attempts suicide.

After an hour, the researchers conclude they have lost Claude for good. When they leave the lab, however, they find his body on the grass at Crespel—shot through the heart. Seemingly, reliving his suicide attempt broke the chaotic loop in which he was stuck and freed him from the time machine. The researchers carry his mortally wounded body inside, and Claude struggles to speak, a single teardrop falling down his cheek. (Whether or not Claude's "second" suicide attempt resulted in his death is left ambiguous.)

== Cast ==
- Claude Rich as Claude Ridder
- Olga Georges-Picot as Catrine
- Anouk Ferjac as Wiana Lust, Claude's friend
- Georges Jamin as Doctor Delavoix, Claude's surgeon
- Alain MacMoy as the technician who comes for Claude at the hospital
- Vania Vilers as the technician who drives Claude to Crespel
- Ray Verhaeghe as the technician who works with the mice
- Van Doude as Jan Rouffer, the head of Crespel
- Yves Kerboul as the technician who explains the time travel process to Claude
- Dominique Rozan as Doctor Haesserts, the doctor at Crespel
- Claire Duhamel as Jane Swolfs, a secretary who worked with Claude
- Bernard Fresson as Bernard Hannecart, Claude's friend
- Irène Tunc as Marcelle Hannecart, Bernard's wife
- Alan Adair as the police inspector in Glasgow
- Marie-Blanche Vergne as Marie-Noire Demoon, the woman who comes and waits outside Claude's apartment
- Carla Marlier as Nicole, the woman who asks Claude to wash her back while she takes a bath
- Pierre Barbaud as Levino, the technician with glasses (uncredited)

== Reception ==
=== Box office ===
According to Fox records, the film required $875,000 in rentals to break even and had made just $450,000 by 11 December 1970, so it was a loss for the studio.

=== Critical response ===
Je t'aime, je t'aime has been reviewed positively by modern critics. On the review aggregator website Rotten Tomatoes, 90% of 10 critics' reviews of the film are positive. Additionally, the film made two critics' top-10 lists in the 2012 Sight and Sound poll of the greatest films ever made.

Writing in Sight and Sound's 1969-1970 winter issue, Penelope Houston praised Resnais for the film's editing, saying: "one has never been more aware of Resnais exploring time through timing: matchless editing, an unfailing instinct for the duration of a shot."

Manohla Dargis of The New York Times highlighted the theme of memory in the film, writing: "Claude's journeys into the past resemble nothing less than memory — fragmented, inconstant, taunting, joyous and heartbreaking. We are, the movie reminds us, what we remember, with a consciousness built from reminiscences that flicker, fade and repeat, flicker, fade and repeat."

After Kino Lorber's Blu-ray release of the film in 2015, American film critic Jonathan Rosenbaum wrote: "for better and for worse, Je t'aime je t'aime functions as a first-person narrative, even more than Resnais' earlier Hiroshima mon amour and his later masterpiece Providence, although we may have some trouble accepting its melancholy and marginal protagonist, a sort of bureaucratic fixture whose professional identity resides in the fringes of the publishing world, as a full-fledged hero."

David Gregory Lawson of Film Comment said that "Alain Resnais's psychologically bruising film maudit is a sci-fi romance that charts a long-term relationship's evolution from an atypically sullen meet-cute to the bitter resentment only the profound understanding of another human being can breed," and noted the use of time travel as a film device to explore "the obstacles life poses to receiving or displaying affection and for probing the pleasures of solitude."

Leo Gray of The Baltimore Sun summarized the film by writing: "this 1968 film's title, 'Je t'aime, je t'aime,' translated into English is 'I love you, I love you,' which suggests that what you are about to watch very well could be a sappy French romance. Nothing could be further from the truth. Instead, director Alain Resnais' film is a futuristic psychological drama and a deep dive into the disturbing nuances of a damaged relationship and the suicidal mind."

== See also ==
- Category:Films about memory
