= Pierre Dux =

French actor (1908–1990)

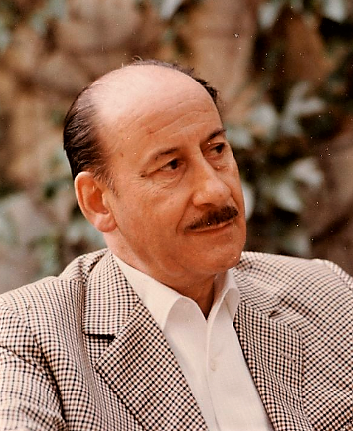
- Festival d'Avignon. 1972
- Born: 21 October 1908; Paris, France
- Died: 1 December 1990 (aged 82); Paris, France
- Occupation: Actor
- Years active: 1932–1990

Pierre Dux (21 October 1908 – 1 December 1990) was a French stage director, stage actor, and film actor. He appeared in 50 films between 1932 and 1990.

== Filmography ==
Year	Title	Role	Director	Notes
1932	The Marriage of Mademoiselle Beulemans	Albert Delpierre	Jean Choux	
1934	Les précieuses ridicules	Du Croissy	Léonce Perret	
1935	Le Monde où l'on s'ennuie	Paul Raymond	Paul Raymond	
1935	La marmaille		Dominique Bernard-Deschamps	
1935	Marie des Angoisses	Jean de Quersac	Michel Bernheim	
1938	Return at Dawn	Karl Ammer	Henri Decoin	
1942	Last Adventure	Jean Bernard	Robert Péguy	
1946	Patrie	Jonas	Louis Daquin	
1946	The Queen's Necklace	Cagliostro	Marcel L'Herbier	
1947	The Royalists	Hulot	Henri Calef	
1947	Monsieur Vincent	Le chancelier Séguier	Maurice Cloche	
1948	The Last Vacation	Valentin Simonet	Roger Leenhardt	
1949	Jean de la Lune	Richard Verdelet - un industriel parisien - amoureux de Marceline	Marcel Achard	
1949	Doctor Laennec	Prof. Récamier	Maurice Cloche	
1950	The Paris Waltz	General Danicheff	Marcel Achard	
1951	Shadow and Light	Doctor Gennari	Henri Calef	
1951	Le Sabre de mon père	Édouard Dujardin	Roger Vitrac	
1951	Gigolo	Le père Quentin	Roger Richebé	
1953	Open Letter	Monsieur Lesage	Alex Joffé	
1954	Poisson d’avril	Gaston Prévost	Gilles Grangier	
1955	Sophie and the Crime	Commissaire Moret	Pierre Gaspard-Huit	
1955	The Grand Maneuver	the Colonel	René Clair	
1956	Meeting in Paris	Florent Saint-Valier	Georges Lampin	
1958	The Mask of the Gorilla	Veslot	Bernard Borderie	
1958	The Lord's Vineyard	Comte Hubert Martin de Kardec	Jean Boyer	
1958	Le chant du Styrène	Narrator	Alain Resnais	
1959	Green Harvest	L'aumônier du lycée	François Villiers	
1961	Goodbye Again	Maître Fleury	Anatol Litvak	
1961	Famous Love Affairs	Joseph Talma	Michel Boisrond	(segment "Les comédiennes")
1961	The Crumblers Are Doing Well	L'éditeur Emile Cadeau	Jean Boyer	
1963	The Day and the Hour	Le commissaire divisionnaire Marboz - de la Police Judiciaire	René Clément	
1964	Behold a Pale Horse		Fred Zinnemann	Uncredited
1964	Patate	Leon Rollo dit Patate	Robert Thomas	
1966	Is Paris Burning?	Alexandre Parodi	René Clément	
1969	Z	the police chief	Costa-Gavras	
1969	La Main	Le chiffonnier / Le psychanalyste	Henri Glaeser	
1970	La Horse	Le juge d'instruction	Pierre Granier-Deferre	
1975	Special Section	General State Attorney Cavarroc	Costa-Gavras	
1980	Trois hommes à abattre	Emmerich	Jacques Deray	
1981	Plein sud	Rognon	Luc Béraud	
1981	La vie continue	Max	Moshe Mizrachi	
1988	The Reader	the magistrate	Michel Deville	
1991	Plaisir d'amour	Cornélius	Nelly Kaplan	
