= Van Gogh (1948 film) =

1948 film

- Directed by: Alain Resnais
- Written by: Gaston Diehl; Robert Hessens
- Produced by: Pierre Braunberger; Gaston Diehl; Robert Hessens
- Starring: Claude Dauphin
- Cinematography: Henry Ferrand
- Edited by: Alain Resnais
- Production companies: Canton-Weiner; Les Amis de l'Art; Panthéon Productions
- Release date: 12 December 1948
- Running time: 20 minutes
- Country: France
- Language: French

Van Gogh is a 1948 French short black and white documentary film directed by Alain Resnais. It won an Oscar in 1950 for Best Short Subject (Two-Reel).

== Cast ==
- Claude Dauphin as récitant / narrator (voice)
