= The War Is Over (1966 film) =

- Theatrical release poster
- French: La Guerre est finie
- Directed by: Alain Resnais
- Written by: Jorge Semprún
- Produced by: Anatole Dauman; Gisèle Rebillon; Catherine Winter
- Starring: Yves Montand; Ingrid Thulin; Geneviève Bujold; Jean Bouise
- Cinematography: Sacha Vierny
- Edited by: Eric Pluet; Ziva Postec
- Music by: Giovanni Fusco
- Production companies: Europa Film; Sofracima
- Distributed by: Cocinor
- Release date: 11 May 1966
- Running time: 121 minutes
- Country: France
- Language: French

The War Is Over (French: La Guerre est finie) is a 1966 French war drama film about a leftist in Franco's Spain, directed by Alain Resnais and starring Yves Montand, Ingrid Thulin and Geneviève Bujold. Joseph Losey directed a sequel, Roads to the South (French: Les Routes du Sud-1978). In July 2021, the film was shown in the Cannes Classics section at the 2021 Cannes Film Festival.

== Plot ==
In the aftermath of the Spanish Civil War, communist veteran Diego has dedicated his life to continuing the struggle against the Francoist State while he lives in exile in Paris. Lately, however, he has become war-weary and skeptical about the tactics of the extremist underground.

After meeting Nadine by using her father's passport, Diego learns that she is involved with an alternative extremist group that is planning an armed attack in Spain. When he meets the young extremists who will execute the plan, he tries to persuade them to abandon the action as misconceived, but they ignore him. The leaders of the underground send Diego on a mission to Barcelona along with a new recruit, perhaps as a way of getting rid of him as the police have since discovered his identity. His lover Marianne, who has received a warning from Nadine, attempts to intercept him before he is arrested.

== Cast ==
- Yves Montand as Diego Mora
- Ingrid Thulin as Marianne
- Geneviève Bujold as Nadine Sallanches
- Jean Dasté as Chief
- Michel Piccoli as First Customs Inspector
- Anouk Ferjac as Marie Jude
- Paul Crauchet as Roberto
- Laurence Badie as Bernadette Pluvier
- Françoise Bertin as Carmen
- Yvette Etiévant as Yvette
- Jean Bouise as Ramon
- Claire Duhamel as Traveller 1
- Antoine Bourseiller as Traveller 2
- Marcel Cuvelier as Inspector

== Accolades ==
The film was nominated for an Oscar for its script. It won the New York Film Critics Circle award for Best Foreign Language Film, the Louis Delluc Prize for best film, and two Étoile de Cristal prizes (best film and best actor). It also tied for the Méliès Prize as the best French film of the year (with Au hasard Balthazar).

== Inspiration ==
The character of Diego Mora is based on the life of the screenwriter Jorge Semprún as a member of the central committee of the Spanish Communist party from 1954 to 1965.
