= Jacques Sternberg =

Belgian writer

- Born: April 17, 1923; Antwerp
- Died: October 11, 2006 (aged 83); Paris
- Occupation: Writer
- Writing career
- Pen name: Jacques Bert
- Language: French
- Genres: Short story, novel

Jacques Sternberg (April 17, 1923, Antwerp, Belgium – October 11, 2006, Paris) was a French-language writer of science fiction and fantastique.

== Biography ==
Sternberg was born to a well-to-do Russian-Jewish family. He was a poor student in school, particularly struggling in French. He began writing around the age of fifteen or sixteen. His early writings tended toward the fantastic and the burlesque, and it was only somewhat later that he began writing science fiction.

After school Sternberg worked as a packer in a cardboard factory, before moving to Paris with the hope of becoming a publishing writer. The literary climate of 1950s Paris was dominated by the Surrealists and Sternberg found some success in that environment. Sternberg never identified with either his Jewish or Belgian heritage preferring to think of himself as simply "mortal."

In his writings Sternberg never wrote of either the rich or the poor, but only of the employee, which represented the only world which he knew and could imagine. (source: Lamediatheque.be)

Sternberg owned a 12-foot Zef-class dinghy and used it for coastal sailing, including in adverse weather. He rejected organized regattas and racing and satirized yachtsmen, sponsors, and yacht clubs in his novel Le navigateur, Dinghy sailing and the sea are recurring subjects in Sternberg's work, including in his novel Sophie, la mer et la nuit

Sternberg died from lung cancer, aged 83.

== Overview ==
Jacques Sternberg straddled the line between the fantastique and science fiction, which he stated was only a subset of the former in a notorious essay, Une Succursale du Fantastique nommée Science-Fiction [A Branch of the Fantastic Called Science Fiction], published in 1958.

In Sternberg's works, the causes of terror are not ghosts or vampires but the modern-day city, often depicted as a giant, evil entity, ready to crush the hapless humans who dare live within its body. This theme reappears in novels such as L'Employé [The Employee] (1958), L'Architecte [The Architect] (1960) and La Banlieue [The Suburb] (1976).

Sternberg's short stories, collected in La Géométrie dans l'Impossible [The Impossible Geometry] (1953), La Géométrie dans la Terreur [The Terror Geometry] (1958), Contes Glacés [Icy Tales] (1974) and Contes Griffus [Clawed Tales] (1993), to name but a few, successfully mix several diverse elements: a very dark sense of Surreal humor, a kafkaesque notion of the absurd, a taste for the macabre, and finally, a somber, pessimistic vision of the world and the future. In Sternberg's fiction, love is never a source of redemption, but something impossible, almost alien, as in Sophie, la Mer, la Nuit [Sophie, The Sea, The Night] (1976) and Le Navigateur [The Navigator] (1977).

Sternberg's science fiction stories followed the same absurdist tradition and were gathered in various collections such as Entre Deux Mondes Incertains [Between Two Uncertain Worlds] (1957), Univers Zéro [Universe Zero] (1970) and Futurs sans Avenir [Future Without Future] (1971). Themes included aliens misguidedly posing as African-Americans to invade America, the 533rd crucifixion of Jesus, the casual destruction of Earth by aliens who cannot understand humanity, etc. Sternberg's stories anticipate the experimental texts of the New Wave and the humor of Douglas Adams.

Sternberg's novels exhibit the same dark, misanthropic characteristics: La Sortie est au Fond de l'Espace [The Exit Lies at the End of Space] (1956) (with a touch of humor) or Attention, Planète Habitée [Beware, Inhabited Planet] (1969) (minus the humor) follows the same, merciless logic.

In addition to his own writing, Sternberg edited several compilation books, writing prefaces to his own selections of the works of Pierre Henri Cami (1964) and François Valorbe (1967), as well as one on the subject of kitsch art. Sternberg also wrote for film director Alain Resnais, penning the script of his 1968 surreal time travel feature, Je t'aime, Je t'aime.

== Selected bibliography ==
- La Géométrie dans l'Impossible [The Impossible Geometry] (1953)
- Le Délit [The Infraction] (1954)
- La sortie est au fond du couloir [The exit is at the end of the corridor] (1956)
- La Sortie est au Fond de l'Espace [The Exit Lies at the End of Space] (1956)
- Entre Deux Mondes Incertains [Between Two Uncertain Worlds] (1957)
- La Géométrie dans la Terreur [The Terror Geometry] (1958)
- L'Employé [The Employee] (1958)
- Une Succursale du Fantastique nommée Science-Fiction [A Branch of the Fantastic Called Science Fiction] (1958)
- L'Architecte [The Architect] (1960)
- Manuel du Parfait Secrétaire Commercial [Handbook of the Perfect Commercial Secretary] (1960)
- La Banlieue [The Suburbs] (1961)
- Un Jour Ouvrable [A Working Day] (1961)
- Toi, Ma Nuit [You, My Night] (1965; transl. as Sexualis '95, 1967)
- C'est la Guerre, Mr. Gruber [It's War, Mr. Gruber], a play (1968)
- Attention, Planète Habitée [Beware, Inhabited Planet] (1969)
- Je t'aime, Je t'aime [I Love You, I Love You] (1969)
- Univers Zéro [Universe Zero] (1970)
- Le Coeur Froid [The Cold Heart] (1971)
- À la Dérive en Dériveur [Drifting in a Dinghy] (1973)
- Dictionnaire du Diable The Devil's Dictionary, printed as "Dictionary of contempt" in alt. editions (1973)
- Futurs sans Avenir (1971; transl. as Future Without Future, 1974)
- Chroniques de France Soir [Chronicles of France Soir] (1971)
- Lettre aux gens malheureux et qui ont bien raison de l'être [Letter to Unhappy People Who Have Every Reason to Be So] (1972)
- Contes Glacés [Icy Tales] (1974)
- Lettre Ouverte aux Terriens [Open Letter to The Earthmen] (1974)
- Sophie, la Mer, la Nuit [Sophie, The Sea, The Night] (1976)
- Vivre en Survivant [To Live As A Survivor] (1977)
- Mémoires provisoires [Temporary Memories] (1977)
- Le Navigateur [The Navigator] (1977)
- Mai 86 (1978)
- Kriss l'Emballeur [Kriss The Packer] (1979)
- Rêver la mer [Dreaming of the sea] (1979)
- Agathe et Béatrice, Claire et Dorothée [Agathe and Béatrice, Claire and Dorothée] (1979)
- Théâtre [Theater], a play (1979)
- Suite pour Evelyne Sweet Evelyne [Suite for Evelyne Sweet Evelyne] (1980)
- Le Supplice des Week-Ends [The Torture of Week-Ends] (1981)
- L'Anonyme [The Anonymous] (1982)
- Dictionnaire des Idées Revues [Dictionary of Reviewed Ideas] (1985)
- Les variations Sternberg [The Sternberg Variations] (1985)
- Les pensées [Thoughts] (1986)
- 188 Contes à Régler [188 Tales on Account] (1988)
- Le shlemihl [The shlemihl] (1989)
- Histoires à Dormir sans Vous [Stories to Sleep Without You] (1990)
- Histoire à Mourir de Vous [Story to Die of You] (1991)
- Contes Griffus [Clawed Tales] (1993)
- Dieu, Moi et les Autres [God, I And Others] (1995)
- Si Loin De Nulle Part [So Far From Nowhere] (1998)
- Profession: Mortel [Profession: Mortal] (2001)
- 300 Contes Pour Solde De Tout Compte [300 Tales to Balance All Accounts] (2002)
- Divers faits [Various facts], a posthumous release (2016)
