= Le Club des bandes dessinées =

French comic strip fan club

Le Club des bandes dessinées (French for "The Club of Comics") was the first organized association of French devotees to the comic strip as art form. It was founded in May 1962. In 1964 the club was renamed the Centre d'études des littératures d'expression graphique (CELEG or "Center for Studies of Graphic Literary Expression").

The club was initially devoted to the comics of the 1930s and 1940s, but its field of interest gradually extended to contemporary comics as well. In 1967, the CELEG was disbanded, but despite its short existence it is considered "extraordinarily influential."

== Founding members and activities ==
Among the founding members of the Club des bandes dessinées was Nouvelle Vague film director Alain Resnais, who served as vice president of the club and at the time owned the largest private collection of comic books in France. Other cofounders were the cartoonist Jean-Claude Forest (creator of Barbarella), the critics Francis Lacassin and Pierre Couperie, and the journalists Jacques Champreux and Jean-Claude Romer. Members also included the avant-garde film director Chris Marker, the writer Alain Robbe-Grillet, the philosopher Edgar Morin, as well as other intellectuals and artists. The club published a quarterly magazine Giff-Wiff, which took its name from a mythical beast in The Katzenjammer Kids. Giff-Wiff published studies of comic book artists and their works and helped to intellectualize comics as an art form. The Italian writer and philosopher Umberto Eco contributed an article, while the cartoonist Morris showcased unpublished drawings of Lucky Luke. In addition, the club organized meetings and republished new editions of older comics such as Flash Gordon, Popeye, and Mandrake the Magician.
