= The Adolescent (film) =

1979 film directed by Jeanne Moreau

- Directed by: Jeanne Moreau
- Written by: Jeanne Moreau; Henriette Jelinek
- Produced by: Tarak Ben Ammar; Philippe Dussart
- Starring: Simone Signoret; Francis Huster; Laetitia Chauveau; Edith Clever; Jacques Weber; Hugues Quester
- Narrated by: Jeanne Moreau
- Cinematography: Pierre Gautard
- Edited by: Colette Leloup
- Music by: Philippe Sarde
- Production company: Carthago Films
- Distributed by: Parafrance
- Release date: 24 January 1979
- Running time: 90 minutes
- Country: France
- Language: French

The Adolescent (French: L'Adolescente) is a French drama film directed by Jeanne Moreau in 1978, released January 1979. It was entered into the 29th Berlin International Film Festival. Set deep in the French countryside just before the start of World War II, it shows the idyllic life of a remote village in the mountainous Auvergne where a family from Paris has come to holiday with relatives. The family get-together marks a coming-of-age for daughter Marie, the adolescent of the title.

== Plot ==
In the summer of 1939, Jean, a butcher in Paris, takes his family to a small town near Avignon for a stay with his widowed mother. Accompanying him is his Dutch wife Eva, and the couple's only child, twelve-year-old Marie. During the family's stay, Marie takes a liking to Alexandre, the thirty-year-old local doctor. Alexandre enjoys Marie's lively and intelligent company until one night Marie comes to the house where he lives alone and offers herself to him. Alexandre rejects Marie.

Shortly after Marie undergoes her first period and is taught by her grandmother to be more careful with men. Her place in Alexandre's life is taken by her mother, who begins a full-blown affair with him while Jean is away helping to bring in the harvest. The grandmother teaches Marie that this is something which can happen, but one must not talk about it and must seek to reconcile the married couple. When Jean returns, Alexandre keeps his distance until the village festival where he asks Eva for a dance. Jean punches Alexandre and a brawl develops. Everything ends with the outbreak of war.

== Cast ==
- Simone Signoret as the grandmother
- Jacques Weber as Jean, her son & father of Marie
- Edith Clever as Eva, his wife & mother of Marie
- Laetitia Chauveau as Marie
- Francis Huster as Alexandre, the locum doctor
- Jean-François Balmer as André, the carpenter
- Roger Blin as Romain, the blacksmith
- Juliette Brac as Mélanie, the blacksmith's wife
- Hugues Quester as Fred, the blacksmith's son
- Frank Muth as François, 'the innocent'
- Maurice Baquet as Jules, the roadman
- Nadine Basile as Rose, the wife of Jules
- Françoise Bette as Violette, the grandmother's servant
- Michel Blanc as Monsieur Bertin
- Isabelle Sadoyan as Louise, the mayor's wife
- Bérangère Bonvoisin as Thérèse, the mayor's daughter
- Élisabeth Margoni as Mademoiselle Gaby

== Release ==
The film was released in France on 24 January 1979. It later received a release in the United States on 12 September 1982.

On 16 March 2023, The Criterion Collection screened The Adolescent, Lumière and Lillian Gish at the Film Forum.

In 2023, Carlotta Films sold the distribution rights to Japan, who released The Adolescent, Lumière and Lillian Gish under an umbrella name Jeanne Moreau, Filmmaker.

In 2024, Jeanne Moreau, Filmmaker was released on Blu-ray.

== Reception ==
In a review for the Chicago Sun-Times, Roger Ebert awarded the film 3 and ½ stars. He wrote,

This is a movie where attention is given to the lives of the characters, not the flourishes of the director. And it is a very subtle film, as we gradually begin to see, through Marie's eyes and our own, the undercurrents in the adult world around the young girl. Moreau suggests that great emotional hurt could befall the little girl, but in the end Signoret is allowed to weave a wonderfully fanciful spell that preserves the child's romantic innocence for one summer more.

Janet Maslin of The New York Times wrote Moreau presents a young girl's coming-of-age "with none of the dewy lasciviousness to which so many male directors are prone. Though Miss Moreau presents the romantic awakening of a pretty, nubile youngster, she does it with delightful straightforwardness and ease."
