= Guernica (1950 film) =

- Directed by: Alain Resnais; Robert Hessens
- Written by: Paul Eluard
- Produced by: Pierre Braunberger
- Starring: María Casares (narrator); Jacques Pruvost (narrator)
- Cinematography: Henri Ferrand
- Music by: Guy Bernard
- Production company: Pantheon Productions
- Distributed by: Les Films de la Pleiade
- Release date: 1950
- Running time: 13 minutes
- Country: France
- Language: French

Guernica is a 1950 French short film directed by Alain Resnais and Robert Hessens.

== Synopsis ==
After a brief voice-over by Jacques Pruvost describing the bombing of Guernica on 26 April 1937, María Casares recites a poem by Paul Eluard on the subject of that atrocity, accompanied by imagery from numerous paintings, drawings, and sculptures produced by Pablo Picasso between 1920 and 1949, particularly Guernica (1937). The oppressive musical arrangements in the film were composed by Guy Bernard.

== Home media ==
The short film is available as a special feature on the DVD edition of The Mystery of Picasso, Henri-Georges Clouzot's 1956 documentary about Picasso.
