= Leloup (surname) =

Leloup is a French surname meaning "the wolf". Notable people with the surname include:

- Colette Leloup (1924–2007), French film executive
- Jean Leloup (born 1961), Canadian singer-songwriter
- Roger Leloup (born 1933), Belgian comics artist
- Hubert Le Loup de Beaulieu
