= Hiroshima mon amour =

1959 film by Alain Resnais

- Theatrical release poster
- Directed by: Alain Resnais
- Written by: Marguerite Duras
- Produced by: Samy Halfon; Anatole Dauman
- Starring: Emmanuelle Riva; Eiji Okada
- Cinematography: Sacha Vierny; Michio Takahashi
- Edited by: Henri Colpi; Jasmine Chasney; Anne Sarraute
- Music by: Georges Delerue; Giovanni Fusco
- Production companies: Argos Films; Como Films; Daiei; Pathé Overseas Productions
- Distributed by: Cocinor (France); Daiei (Japan)
- Release dates: 8 May 1959 (Cannes); 10 June 1959 (France); 20 June 1959 (Japan)
- Running time: 90 minutes
- Countries: France; Japan
- Languages: French; Japanese

Hiroshima mon amour (French pronunciation: [iʁoʃima mɔ̃n‿amuʁ], lit. 'Hiroshima, My Love'; Japanese: 二十四時間の情事, romanized: Nijūyojikan no jōji, lit. 'Twenty-four hour love affair') is a 1959 romantic drama film directed by French director Alain Resnais and written by French author Marguerite Duras.

Resnais' first feature-length work, it was a co-production between France and Japan, and documents a series of intensely personal conversations (or one long conversation) over slightly more than a 24-hour period between an unnamed French actress and a Japanese architect. The film is notable for Resnais' innovative use of brief flashbacks to suggest flashes of memory, which create a nonlinear storyline.

Along with films such as Breathless (1960) and The 400 Blows (1959), Hiroshima mon amour brought international attention to the new movement in French cinema and is widely considered to be one of the most influential films of the French New Wave. In particular, it was a major catalyst for Left Bank Cinema.

== Plot ==
A series of closeups of the backs and arms of a man and woman embracing, amidst falling ash and then covered in sweat. In voice-over, the woman recounts the aftermath of the atomic bombing of Hiroshima that she has seen on her trip to the city, while newsreel and fictional footage of victims, protests, war memorials, and the streets and buildings of modern Hiroshima are shown. A voice-over from the man repeatedly states that the woman has not seen anything, nor does she know what it is to forget. Returning to conversation, the audience learns that the man is from Hiroshima, and his family died in the bombing while he was away fighting in the Pacific, and that the woman is a French actress who is in the city to make an anti-war film.

In the morning, the woman watches the man sleep. His twitching hand reminds her of her first love, a soldier whose hand moved similarly as he lay dying. The Japanese man wakes, and it becomes clear he and the woman met the previous night at a café. She learns he is an architect who is involved in politics. They discuss the bombing and the end of the war, and he is enchanted by the word "Nevers", her hometown, to which she never wants to return. The man says he would like to see the woman again, but she says she is flying back to Paris the next day. Neither this nor the revelation that she has children change how he feels, but she, though torn, repeatedly declines to arrange another meeting.

The man visits the woman at the filming location, and she is happy to see him. He takes her back to his house. She asks if he lives alone, and he replies that his wife is out of town for a few days. They both say they are happy in their marriages, though they have had casual affairs before, and have sex again. After deciding to spend the woman's remaining time in Hiroshima together, they go to a tea room, where the man asks the woman to tell him more about Nevers and her life there. Intercut with flashbacks, she tells how she and an occupying German soldier fell in love and planned to elope to Bavaria before he was shot while waiting for her on the day Nevers was liberated, how the villagers shaved her head when they found out about the relationship, and how her parents locked her alternately in her room and the cellar while her hair grew out and she came out of her madness and then sent her away to Paris. She tries to convey the pain she feels about forgetting the German and their love, and indicates she has been trying to keep her distance from the Japanese man because she does not want any more such heartbreak. She explains how she stayed with the German while he was dying, how he took two days to die, and how she never saw the moment that he died. Later, as she arrived in Paris, Hiroshima had been bombed.

She tells the man that they will probably never see each other again, but he is elated when he learns the woman never told her husband about the German. They leave the tea room and she tells him to go away. In her hotel room, she feels guilty about telling the man about the German, but decides to stay in Hiroshima. She goes back to the now-closed tea room, and the man finds her and asks her to stay. She weakly says she will, but then tells him again to go away. They walk around the city, together and separately, images of Hiroshima alternating with images of Nevers. The woman goes to a train station, where she lets go of some of her issues surrounding her first love and decides she might like to visit Nevers. Distracted by a stranger's question, the man does not notice that she has left. Taking a cab to a nightclub, the man follows her. The place is nearly empty and they sit apart. As the sun rises, a Japanese man sits by the woman and hits on her in English.

Back in the woman's hotel room, the architect knocks at the door. She lets him in and yells that she is already starting to forget him, but abruptly calms and says his name is "Hiroshima". He responds that it is, and her name is "Nevers".

== Cast ==
- Emmanuelle Riva as Elle ("Her")
- Eiji Okada as Lui ("Him")
- Bernard Fresson as l'Allemand ("The German")
- Stella Dassas as la mère ("The Mother")
- Pierre Barbaud as le père ("The Father")

== Production ==
In 1954, while Alain Resnais was editing Agnès Varda's film La Pointe Courte, he was reluctant to work on it because it was "so nearly the film he wanted to make himself". The film's narrative structure inspired Hiroshima mon amour.

According to James Monaco, Resnais was originally commissioned to make a short documentary about the atomic bomb, but spent several months confused about how to proceed because he did not want to recreate his 1956 Holocaust documentary Night and Fog. He later went to his producer and joked that the film could not be done unless Marguerite Duras was involved in writing the screenplay.

Explaining how she and Resnais sought to find something original to say about Hiroshima, about which much had by then already been said, Duras wrote in 1958: "[W]e tried to bring Hiroshima back as a love story ... We tried to make it so that between two people as geographically, philosophically, historically, economically, racially, etc. remote from each other as possible, Hiroshima was the common ground where the universal facts of eroticism, love, and misfortune appear in a less mendacious light than elsewhere."

The film was a co-production by companies from both France and Japan. The producers stipulated that one main character must be French and the other Japanese, and also required that the film be shot in both countries employing film crews comprising technicians from each. The French scenes were shot in Nevers. However, several scenes from the film located in Nevers were, in fact, filmed in Autun.

Among the film's innovations is the way Resnais intercut very brief flashback sequences into scenes to suggest a brief flash of memory. He later used a similar effect in Last Year at Marienbad (1961) and The War Is Over (1966).

== Release ==
The uncensored version of the film was shown at the Montreal International Film Festival in 1960, but was censored for its Canadian theatrical release.

== Reception and legacy ==
Hiroshima mon amour was internationally acclaimed, and became an art-house hit in the United States. It has been described as "the French New Wave's The Birth of a Nation" by American critic Leonard Maltin. Jonas Mekas wrote in The Village Voice: "Alain Resnais' 'Hiroshima, Mon Amour' is a peak in the new French romanticism. At the same time it is, without question, the most intelligent film in at least a decade ... its themes and ideas are discussed and revealed on a level of subtlety to be found only in the best of literature." New Wave filmmaker Jean-Luc Godard described its inventiveness as "Faulkner plus Stravinsky" and celebrated the film's originality, calling it "the first film without any cinematic references". A. H. Weiler called it "a delicately wrought drama ... a complex yet compelling tour de force—as a patent plea for peace and the abolition of atomic warfare; as a poetic evocation of love lost and momentarily found, and as a curiously intricate but intriguing montage of thinking on several planes in Proustian style." Weiler wrote of Resnais: "As a director who set himself an extremely difficult task, he expertly sustains the fragile moods of his theme most of the way." Resnais himself described the film as "a sort of poem in which the images would act as counterpoint to the text". In a 1959 round-table discussion among Cahiers du Cinéma editorial staff, filmmaker Éric Rohmer said: "I think that in a few years, in ten, twenty, or thirty years, we will know whether Hiroshima mon amour was the most important film since the war, the first modern film of sound cinema."

The film holds a rating of 96% from 47 reviews on Rotten Tomatoes with the consensus: "Distinguished by innovative technique and Emmanuelle Riva's arresting performance, Hiroshima Mon Amour is a poignant love story as well as a thoughtful meditation on international trauma." The film won the FIPRESCI International Critics' Prize at the 1959 Cannes Film Festival, where the film was excluded from the official selection because of its sensitive subject matter of nuclear bombs and to avoid upsetting the U.S. government, and it won the prestigious Grand Prix from the Belgian Film Critics Association in 1960. For her work on the film, screenwriter Marguerite Duras was nominated for the award for Best Original Screenplay at the 33rd Academy Awards.

Norman N. Holland wrote: "Beginning with the background for the screen credits ... images of opposition and separateness dominate the screen. The lovers have to shout at each other over the honks of auto horns, and in the moment of love the telephone rings or someone coughs next door. Visually, against the choppy sequences and the harsh blacks and whites of neon neo-Hiroshima, there stands out the marvelously long and graceful pan following the girl as she bicycles to her German lover through the gray, barren landscape of Nevers. Similarly, Resnais' idiosyncrasy of cutting a discontinuous visual sequence against continuous dialogue or music on the soundtrack obliquely works out the same theme of sameness and separateness, as well as giving the film a curiously dual tone, at once literal and dreamy."

Dilys Powell wrote that Resnais and Duras "used the flashback precisely as memory uses it: the mind recognising an association between an image in the present and an incident long ago, then swerving back to now; the past re-offering itself not in chronological order but higgledy-piggledy ... It is not only the past which in the film is shown in fragments. The present, too ... is a succession of scenes chronological, certainly, but without conventional links. The pair talk, their confidences are exchanged, in snatches, in dramatic bursts, against settings their movement between which is taken for granted."

In 2002, the film was voted by the international contributors of the French film magazine Positif to be one of the top 10 films since the magazine was founded in 1952. It was shown as part of the Cannes Classics section of the 2013 Cannes Film Festival and was screened nine times at the Harvard Film Archive between 28 November and 13 December 2014.

== In popular culture ==
=== Film ===
- In 2001, Japanese film director Nobuhiro Suwa directed H Story, a docufiction about his attempt to remake Hiroshima Mon Amour.
- In 2003, Iranian film director Bahman Pour-Azar released Where or When. The 85-minute film places Pour-Azar's characters in the same circumstances as Resnais's nearly a half century later. However, the current global tension of today's world is the backdrop instead of post-war Hiroshima. When screening the film, Stuart Alson, who founded the New York International Independent Film and Video Festival, said the piece was "a parallel line of work with the French masterpiece Hiroshima mon amour".

== See also ==
- List of avant-garde films of the 1950s

== Works cited ==
- Spencer, Michael (2003). Hollywood North: Creating the Canadian Motion Picture Industry. Cantos International Publishing. ISBN 289594007X.
