= Jean Cayrol =

French poet, publisher, and member of the Académie Goncourt (1911–2005)

Jean Cayrol (French: [kɛʁɔl]; 6 June 1911 – 10 February 2005) was a French poet, publisher, and member of the Académie Goncourt born in Bordeaux. He is perhaps best known for writing the narration in Alain Resnais's 1956 documentary film, Night and Fog. He was a major contributor to the subversive, philosophical French publication Tel Quel.

In 1941, during the Nazi occupation of France, Cayrol joined the French Resistance, but he was subsequently betrayed, arrested, and sent to the Gusen concentration camp in 1943. He was one of the youngest French inmates at that camp, and consequently was made to do some of the hardest work along with the construction of roads and railways. When Cayrol wanted to die by refusing any further food, his life was saved by Johann Gruber, the "Saint of Gusen." Gruber gave Cayrol some "Gruber soup" in the washroom of barrack No. 20, and intervened for Cayrol to get him transferred to an easier job. Cayrol thereafter worked at the final inspection of Steyr-Daimler-Puch at KL Gusen I (the "Georgenmuehle" command), where he was able to write literature during breaks.

Between February 1944 and April 1945, Cayrol created a large volume of poetry at Gusen I. One of his poems from this era is the text for "Chant d'Espoir", which was set to music by a fellow Gusen I inmate, Remy Gillis, in 1944. Alerte aux ombres 1944–1945, a collection of Cayrol's Gusen texts, was published in 1997.

The figure of Lazarus appears many times in Cayrol's work. Having escaped death himself, Cayrol was fascinated and inspired by the story of Lazarus who died, whom Jesus returned to life after being dead.

Cayrol founded and edited for ten years (1956–66) the review Ecrire, published by Éditions du Seuil, who had recruited him as an editorial adviser in 1949.

He retired to Bordeaux, where he died at the age of 93.

== Selected bibliography ==
=== Novels ===
- Je vivrai l'amour des autres (1947). Originally published in two volumes: On vous parle and Les Premiers Jours.
- L'Espace d'une nuit (1954). All in a Night, trans. Gerard Hopkins (Faber and Faber, 1957)
- Les Corps étrangers (1959). Foreign Bodies, trans. Richard Howard (Putnam, 1960)
- Le Froid du soleil (1963)
- Midi minuit (1966)
- Je l'entends encore (1968)
- Histoire d'une prairie (1969)
- Histoire d'un désert (1972)
- Histoire de la mer (1973)
- Histoire de la forêt (1975)
- Histoire d'une maison (1976)
- Histoire du ciel (1979)

=== Poetry ===
- Poésie-journal I (1969)
- Poésie-journal II (1977)
- Poésie-journal III (1980)

=== As screenwriter ===
- Nuit et Brouillard (1956)
- Muriel (1963)

== Awards and honours ==
- 1947: Prix Renaudot for Je vivrai l'amour des autres
