= Colette Leloup =

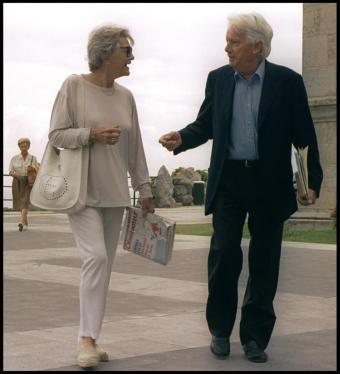
- Colette Leloup and Jorge Semprún, at The Royal Palace of La Magdalena in Santander, Spain.
- Born: November 19, 1924; Paris, France
- Died: October 20, 2007 (aged 82); Paris, France
- Spouse: Jorge Semprún (1958–2007, her death)

Colette Leloup (November 19, 1924 – October 20, 2007) was a French film executive, editor-in-chief. She went on to edit many films which included Je t'aime, Je t'aime (1968).

== Filmography ==
Edition

- 1979: L'Adolescente .... Editor. (Film)
- 1974: Les Deux Memoires .... Film Editing. (Documentary) (Where her husband Jorge Semprún Spanish exile, interviews participants on both sides of the Spanish Civil War(1936-39) ).
- 1968: Je t'aime, Je t'aime .... Editor. (Film)
- 1966: La curée .... Assistant editor. (Film)
- 1960: Le Dialogue des Carmélites .... Assistant editor. (Film)
- 1958: Toi... le venin .... Assistant editor. (Film)
- 1957: Assassins et voleurs .... Assistant editor. (Film)

== Personal life ==
On March 23, 1963, she married Jorge Semprún in Paris, France. Colette died on October 20, 2007, and was buried in Garentreville, France. Four years later (2011), her husband Jorge Semprún was buried in the same place beside her.
