= Le chant du Styrène =

1958 film

- Directed by: Alain Resnais
- Narrated by: Pierre Dux
- Release date: 1958
- Running time: 13 minutes
- Country: France
- Language: French

Le chant du Styrène (lit. "The Song of Styrene") is a 13-minute long French documentary film from 1958. It was directed by Alain Resnais for the French industrial group Pechiney to highlight the merits of plastics. The narration spoken by Pierre Dux is a poem written by Raymond Queneau, all in alexandrines, whose title is a pun on the phonetic resemblance of "styrene" to "siren".
