= Galan, Hautes-Pyrénées =

Galan
- Commune
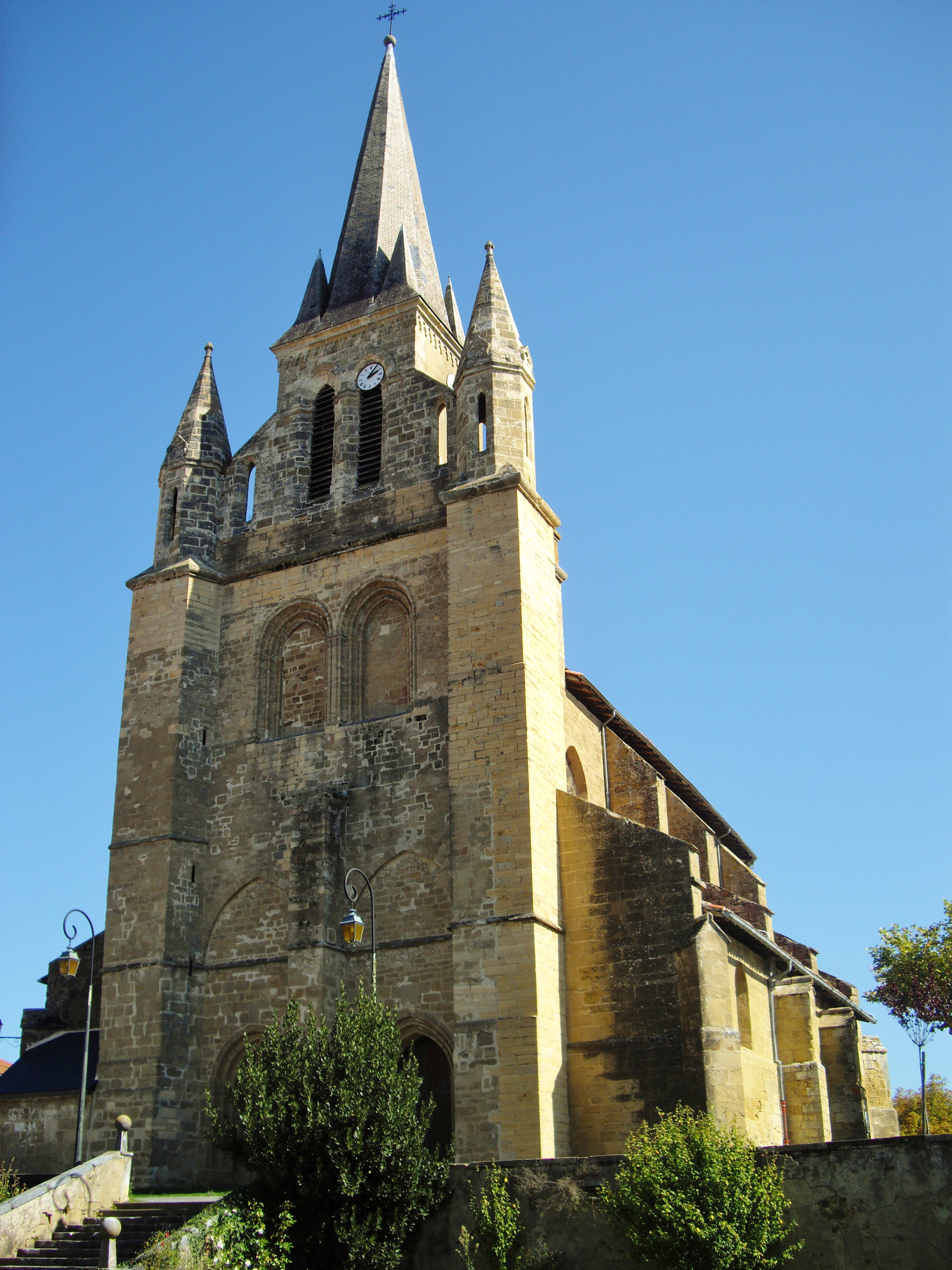
- The church of Saint-Julien

- Coat of arms
- Location of Galan
- Location within France Location within Occitanie
- Coordinates: 43°13′20″N 0°24′30″E
- Country: France
- Region: Occitania
- Department: Hautes-Pyrénées
- Arrondissement: Bagnères-de-Bigorre
- Canton: La Vallée de l'Arros et des Baïses
- Intercommunality: Plateau de Lannemezan

Government
  - Mayor (2020–2026): Martine Labat
- Area^{1}: 14.05 km^{2} (5.42 sq mi)
- Elevation: 381 m (1,250 ft)
- Highest elevation: 501 m (1,644 ft)
- Lowest elevation: 310 m (1,020 ft)
- Population (2023): 698
  - Density: 49.7/km^{2} (129/sq mi)
- Time zone: UTC+01:00 (CET)
  - Summer (DST): UTC+02:00 (CEST)
- INSEE/Postal code: 65183 /65330
- ^{1} French Land Register data, which excludes lakes, ponds, glaciers > 1 km^{2} (0.386 sq mi or 247 acres) and river estuaries.

Galan (French pronunciation: [ɡalɑ̃]) is a commune in the Hautes-Pyrénées department in south-western France.

== Geography ==
The Petite Baïse flows northward through the middle of the commune.

== See also ==
- Communes of the Hautes-Pyrénées department
