= Alain Resnais =

French film director (1922–2014)

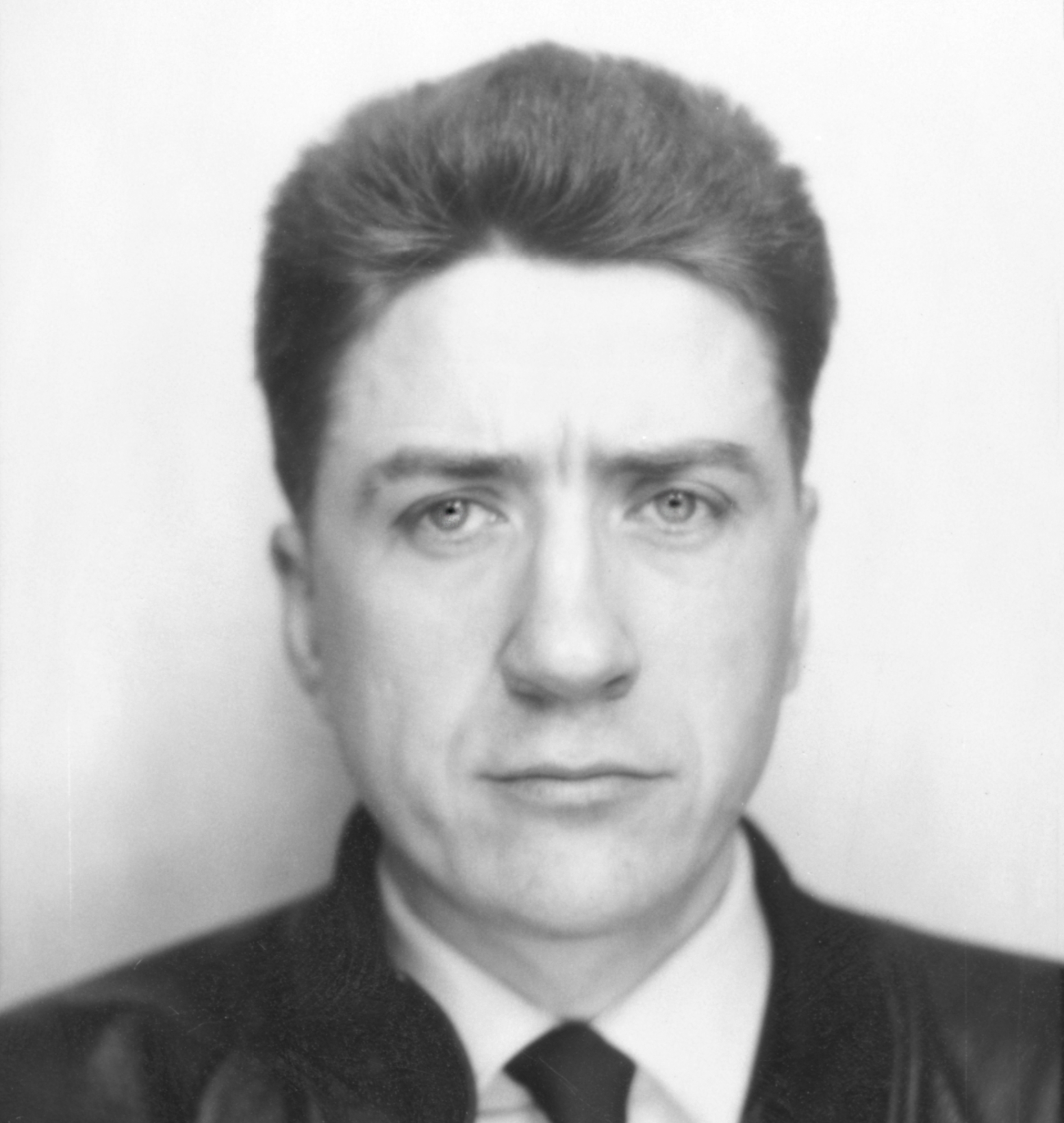
- Resnais in 1959
- Born: 3 June 1922; Vannes, France
- Died: 1 March 2014 (aged 91); Neuilly-sur-Seine, France
- Resting place: Montparnasse Cemetery
- Occupations: Film director; film editor; screenwriter; cinematographer
- Years active: 1946–2014
- Spouses: Florence Malraux (m. 1969, divorced) Sabine Azéma (m. 1998)

Alain Resnais (French: [alɛ̃ ʁɛnɛ]; 3 June 1922 – 1 March 2014) was a French film director and screenwriter whose career extended over more than six decades. His films frequently explore the relationship between consciousness, memory, and the imagination, and he was noted for devising innovative formal structures for his narratives.

After training as a film editor in the mid-1940s, Resnais went on to direct short films including Night and Fog (1956), an influential documentary about the Nazi concentration camps. Resnais then began making feature films in the late 1950s and consolidated his early reputation with Hiroshima mon amour (1959), Last Year at Marienbad (1961), Muriel (1963) and Je t'aime, je t'aime (1968) all of which adopted unconventional narrative techniques to deal with themes of troubled memory and the imagined past.

Resnais was associated with the French New Wave (la nouvelle vague), though he did not regard himself as being fully part of that movement. He had closer links to the "Left Bank" group of authors and filmmakers who shared a commitment to modernism and an interest in left-wing politics (these included Agnès Varda and Chris Marker). He also established a regular practice of working on his films in collaboration with writers previously unconnected with the cinema such as Jean Cayrol, Marguerite Duras, Alain Robbe-Grillet, Jorge Semprún and Jacques Sternberg.

In later films, Resnais moved away from the overtly political topics of some previous works and developed his interests in an interaction between cinema and other cultural forms, including theatre, music, and comic books. This led to imaginative adaptations of plays by Alan Ayckbourn, Henri Bernstein and Jean Anouilh, as well as films featuring various kinds of popular song.

Throughout his career, he won many awards from international film festivals and academies, including one Academy Award, two César Awards for best director (he was nominated on eight occasions), three Louis Delluc Prize and one Golden Lion at the Venice Film Festival.

== Early life ==
Resnais was born in 1922 in Vannes in Brittany, where his father was a pharmacist. An only child, he was often ill with asthma in childhood, which led to his being withdrawn from school and educated at home. He was an eager reader, in a range that extended from classics to comic books, but from the age of 10 he became fascinated by films. For his twelfth birthday his parents gave him a Kodak 8mm camera with which he began to make his own short films, including a three-minute version of Fantômas. Around the age of 14, he discovered surrealism and through that an interest in the works of André Breton.

Visits to the theatre in Paris gave Resnais the desire to be an actor, and in 1939 he moved to Paris to become an assistant in Georges Pitoëff's company at the Théâtre des Mathurins. From 1940 to 1942 he studied acting in the Cours René-Simon (and one of his small jobs at this time was as an extra in the film Les Visiteurs du soir), but he then decided in 1943 to apply to the newly formed film school IDHEC to study film editing. The filmmaker Jean Grémillon was one of the teachers who had the most influence on him at that period.

Resnais left in 1945 to do his military service which took him to Germany and Austria with the occupying French forces, as well as making him a temporary member of a travelling theatre company, Les Arlequins. He returned to Paris in 1946 to start his career as a film editor, but also began making short films of his own. Finding himself to be a neighbour of the actor Gérard Philipe, he persuaded him to appear in a 16mm surrealist short, Schéma d'une identification (now lost). A more ambitious feature-length work, Ouvert pour cause d'inventaire, has also vanished without trace.

== Career ==
=== 1946–1958: short films ===
After beginning with a series of short documentary films showing artists at work in their studios, as well as a few commercial commissions, Resnais was invited in 1948 to make a film about the paintings of Van Gogh, to coincide with an exhibition that was being mounted in Paris. He filmed it at first in 16mm, but when the producer Pierre Braunberger saw the results, Resnais was asked to remake it in 35mm. Van Gogh received a prize at the Venice Biennale in 1948, and also won an Oscar for Best 2-reel Short in 1949. (Braunberger went on to act as producer for several of Resnais's films in the following decade.) Resnais continued to address artistic subjects in Gauguin (1950) and Guernica (1950), which examined the Picasso painting based on the 1937 bombing of the town, and presented it to the accompaniment of a text written by Paul Éluard. A political perspective on art also underpinned his next project (co-directed with Chris Marker), Les statues meurent aussi (Statues Also Die, 1953), a polemic about the destruction of African art by French cultural colonialism.

Nuit et Brouillard (Night and Fog, 1956) was one of the first documentaries about the Nazi concentration camps, but it deals more with the memory of the camps than with their actual past existence. Realising that standard documentary techniques would be incapable of confronting the enormity of the horror (and even risked humanising it), Resnais chose to use a distancing technique by alternating historical black-and-white images of the camps with contemporary colour footage of the sites in long tracking shots. The accompanying narration (written by Jean Cayrol, himself a survivor of the camps) was intentionally understated to add to the distancing effect. Although the film encountered censorship problems with the French government, its impact was immense and it remains one of the director's most admired works.

A different kind of collective memory was considered in Toute la mémoire du monde (1956), in which the seemingly endless spaces and bibliographic riches of the Bibliothèque nationale were explored in another compendium of long travelling shots. The film was referenced in the novel Austerlitz by W.G. Sebald, portraying the library as "an immensely complex and constantly evolving creature which had to be fed with myriads of words, in order to bring forth myriads of words in its own turn."

In 1958 Resnais undertook a commission from the Pechiney company to make short film, in colour and wide-screen, extolling the merits of plastics, Le Chant du styrène. Poetry was brought to the project, literally, by Raymond Queneau who wrote the narration for the film in rhyming couplets.

In his decade of making documentary short films, Resnais established his interest in and talent for collaboration with leading figures in other branches of the arts: with the painters who were the subjects of his early works; with writers (Eluard in Guernica, Cayrol in Nuit et Brouillard, Queneau in Le Chant du styrène); with musicians (Darius Milhaud in Gauguin, Hanns Eisler in Nuit et Brouillard, Pierre Barbaud in Le Chant du styrène); and with other filmmakers (Resnais was the editor of Agnès Varda's first film, La Pointe courte, and co-directed with Chris Marker Les statues meurent aussi). Similar collaborations underpinned his future work in feature films.

=== 1959–1968 ===
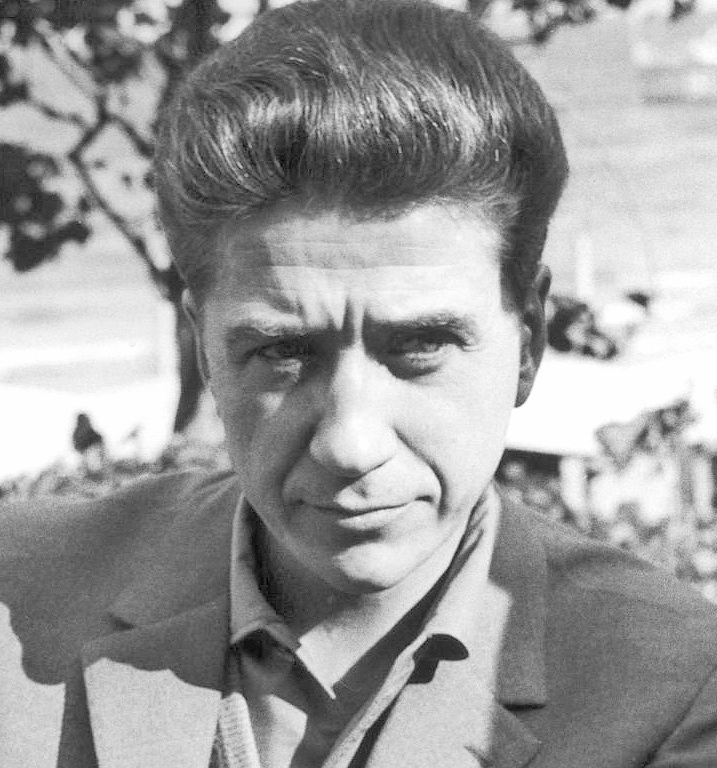
Resnais in 1962

Resnais's first feature film was Hiroshima mon amour (1959). It originated as a commission from the producers of Nuit et Brouillard (Anatole Dauman and Argos Films) to make a documentary about the atomic bomb, but Resnais initially declined, thinking that it would be too similar to the earlier film about the concentration camps and that it presented the same problem of how to film incomprehensible suffering. However, in discussion with the novelist Marguerite Duras a fusion of fiction and documentary was developed which acknowledged the impossibility of speaking about Hiroshima; one could only speak about the impossibility of speaking about Hiroshima. In the film, the themes of memory and forgetting are explored via new narrative techniques which balance images with narrated text and ignore conventional notions of plot and story development. The film was shown at the 1959 Cannes Film Festival, alongside Truffaut's Les Quatre Cents Coups (The 400 Blows), and its success became associated with the emerging movement of the French New Wave.

Resnais's next film was L'Année dernière à Marienbad (Last Year at Marienbad, 1961), which he made in collaboration with the novelist Alain Robbe-Grillet. The fragmented and shifting narrative presents three principal characters, a woman and two men, in the opulent setting of a grand European hotel or château where the possibility of a previous encounter a year ago is repeatedly asserted and questioned and contradicted. After winning the Golden Lion at the Venice Film Festival, the film attracted great attention and provoked many divergent interpretations of how it should be understood, encouraged by interviews in which Robbe-Grillet and Resnais themselves appeared to give conflicting explanations of the film. There was little doubt however that it represented a significant challenge to the traditional concept of narrative construction in cinema.

At the beginning of the 1960s France remained deeply divided by the Algerian War, and in 1960 the Manifesto of the 121, which protested against French military policy in Algeria, was signed by a group of leading intellectuals and artists who included Resnais. The war, and the difficulty of coming to terms with its horrors, was a central theme of his next film Muriel (1963), which used a fractured narrative to explore the mental states of its characters. It was among the first French films to comment, even indirectly, on the Algerian experience.

A contemporary political issue also formed the background for La guerre est finie (The War Is Over, 1966), this time the clandestine activities of left-wing opponents of the Franco government in Spain. Resnais's scriptwriter on this film was the Spanish author Jorge Semprún, himself an ex-member of the Spanish Communist Party now in voluntary exile in France. Both men denied that the film was about Spain, but when it was entered for the official competition at the Cannes Film Festival in 1966, an objection from the Spanish government caused it to be withdrawn and it was shown out of competition. In 1967 Resnais participated with six other directors, including Chris Marker and Jean-Luc Godard, in a collective work about the Vietnam war, Loin du Vietnam (Far from Vietnam).

From 1968 onwards, Resnais's films no longer addressed, at least directly, big political issues in the way that a number of his previous ones had done, and his next project seemed to mark a change of direction. Je t'aime, je t'aime (1968) drew upon the traditions of science-fiction for a story of a man sent back into his past, a theme which enabled Resnais again to present a narrative of fragmented time. Alain Resnais's scriptwriter on this film was the author Jacques Sternberg. The film was unlucky in its release (its planned screening at Cannes was cancelled amid the political events of May 1968), and it was almost five years before Resnais was able to direct another film.

Throughout the 1960s, Resnais was attached to direct an international production called Les Aventures de Harry Dickson, based on the stories by Jean Ray, with Anatole Dauman as producer. The project was intended to star either Dirk Bogarde or Laurence Olivier as the titular detective, with André Delvaux attached as the production designer, and the composer Karlheinz Stockhausen attached for the score. Resnais and Dauman worked towards the project for a decade before finally giving up. The screenplay for the film by Frédéric de Towarnicki was published in 2007.

=== 1969–1980 ===
Resnais spent some time in America working on various unfulfilled projects, including one about the Marquis de Sade. He also published Repérages, a volume of his photographs, taken between 1948 and 1971, of locations in London, Scotland, Paris, Nevers, Lyon, New York and Hiroshima; Jorge Semprun wrote the introductory text. Some of the photographs relate to his unfulfilled Harry Dickson film.

After contributing an episode to L'An 01 (The Year 01) (1973), a collective film organised by Jacques Doillon, Resnais made a second collaboration with Jorge Semprun for Stavisky (1974), based on the life of the notorious financier and embezzler whose death in 1934 provoked a political scandal. With glamorous costumes and sets, a musical score by Stephen Sondheim, and Jean-Paul Belmondo in the title role, it was seen as Resnais's most commercial film to date, but its complex narrative structure showed clear links with the formal preoccupations of his earlier films.

With Providence (1977), Resnais made his first film in English, with a screenplay written by David Mercer, and a cast that included John Gielgud, Dirk Bogarde and Ellen Burstyn. The story shows an ageing, maybe dying, novelist grappling with alternative versions of his own past as he adapts them for his fiction. Resnais was eager that the dark subject should remain humorous, and he described it as "a macabre divertissement". Formal innovation characterised Mon oncle d'Amérique (My American Uncle, 1980) in which the theories of the neurobiologist Henri Laborit about animal behaviour are juxtaposed with three interwoven fictional stories; and a further counterpoint to the fictional characters is provided by the inclusion of film extracts of the classic French film actors with whom they identify. The film won several international awards including the Grand Prix at the Cannes Film Festival, and it also proved to be one of Resnais's most successful with the public.

=== 1981–2014 ===
From the 1980s onwards Resnais showed a particular interest in integrating material from other forms of popular culture into his films, drawing especially on music and the theatre. In almost all of his remaining films he chose to work repeatedly with a core group of actors comprising Sabine Azéma, Pierre Arditi, and André Dussollier, sometimes accompanied by Fanny Ardant or Lambert Wilson. The first four of these were among the large cast of La vie est un roman (Life Is a Bed of Roses, 1983), a comic fantasy about utopian dreams in which three stories, from different eras and told in different styles, are interwoven within a shared setting. The action is punctuated by episodes of song which develop towards the end into scenes that are almost operatic; Resnais said that his starting point had been the desire to make a film in which dialogue and song would alternate.

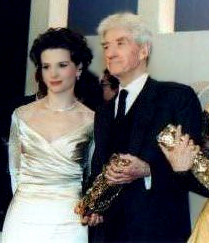
Resnais with Juliette Binoche at the 23rd César Awards in 1998.

Music, very differently used, was a major component of L'Amour à mort (Love unto Death, 1984). For this intense chamber work with four principal actors (Azéma, Arditi, Ardant and Dussollier), Resnais asked Hans Werner Henze to compose musical episodes which would act as a "fifth character", not an accompaniment but a fully integrated element of the drama with which the speech of the actors would interact. In subsequent years, Resnais gave his attention to music of more popular styles. He made Gershwin (1992), an innovative TV documentary in which the American composer's life and works were reviewed through the testimonies of performers and filmmakers, juxtaposed with commissioned paintings by Guy Peellaert. In On connaît la chanson (Same Old Song, 1997), his tribute to television works of Dennis Potter, the characters express their key emotions or private thoughts by bursting into snatches of well-known (recorded) popular songs without interrupting the dramatic situation. A long-neglected operetta from the 1920s was the unexpected basis for Resnais's next film Pas sur la bouche (Not on the Lips, 2003), in which he sought to reinvigorate an unfashionable form of entertainment by recreating its theatricality for the camera and entrusting most of its musical numbers to actors rather than to trained singers.

There are many references to the theatre throughout Resnais's filmmaking (Marienbad, Muriel, Stavisky, Mon oncle d'Amérique), but he first undertook the challenge of taking a complete stage work and giving it new cinematic life in Mélo (1986), an adaptation of Henri Bernstein's 1929 play of the same name. Resnais remained entirely faithful to the play (apart from shortening it) and he emphasised its theatricality by filming in long takes on large sets of evidently artificial design, as well as by marking off the acts of the play with the fall of a curtain. After an excursion into the world of comic books and cartoons in I Want to Go Home (1989), an ambitious theatrical adaptation followed with the diptych of Smoking/No Smoking (1993). Resnais, having admired the plays of Alan Ayckbourn for many years, chose to adapt what appeared the most intractable of them, Intimate Exchanges, a series of eight interlinked plays which follow the consequences of a casual choice to sixteen possible endings. Resnais slightly reduced the number of permuted endings and compressed the plays into two films, each having a common starting point, and to be seen in any order. Sabine Azéma and Pierre Arditi played all the parts, and the theatricality of the undertaking was again emphasised by the studio set designs for a fictional English village. Resnais returned to Ayckbourn in the following decade for his adaptation of Private Fears in Public Places to which he gave the film title of Cœurs (2006). Among the stage/film effects which contribute to its mood of "cheerful desolation" is the artificial snow which is continually seen through set windows until eventually it falls on the studio interior as well.

Speaking in 1986, Resnais said that he did not make a separation between cinema and theatre and refused to make enemies of them. He preferred working with "people of the theatre", and he said that he would never want to film a novel. It was therefore something of a departure when he chose L'Incident, a novel by Christian Gailly, as the basis for Les Herbes folles (Wild Grass, 2009). He explained however that what initially attracted him to the book was the quality of its dialogue, which he retained largely unchanged for the film. When Les Herbes folles was shown at the Cannes Film Festival, it was the occasion for a special jury award to Resnais "for his work and exceptional contribution to the history of cinema".

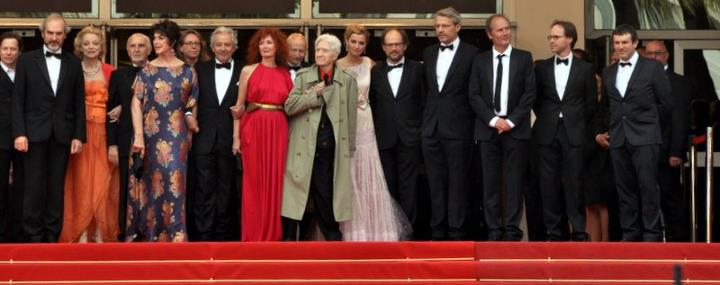
The cast and crew of the film You Ain’t Seen Nothin’ Yet! at the 2012 Cannes Film Festival.

In his final two films, Resnais again drew his source material from the theatre. Vous n'avez encore rien vu (You Ain't Seen Nothin' Yet!, 2012) was adapted from two plays by Jean Anouilh, and it assembled thirteen actors (many of them regular performers in Resnais's earlier films) who have been summoned by the dying wish of an author to witness a new performance their roles in one of his plays. The film was shown in competition for the Palme d'Or at the 2012 Cannes Film Festival. Aimer, boire et chanter (2014) was the third film which Resnais adapted from a play by Alan Ayckbourn, in this case Life of Riley, in which three couples are thrown into confusion by the news that a shared friend has a terminal illness. Three weeks before Resnais's death, the film received its premiere in the competition section of the 64th Berlin International Film Festival in February 2014, where it won a Silver Bear award "for a feature film that opens new perspectives". At the time of his death, Resnais was preparing a further Ayckbourn project, based on the 2013 play Arrivals & Departures.

== Reputation ==
Resnais was often linked with the group of French filmmakers who made their breakthrough as the New Wave or nouvelle vague in the late 1950s, but by then he had already established a significant reputation through his ten years of work on documentary short films. He defined his own relationship by saying: "Although I was not fully part of the New Wave because of my age, there was some mutual sympathy and respect between myself and Rivette, Bazin, Demy, Truffaut ... So I felt friendly with that team." He nevertheless acknowledged his debt to the New Wave because it created the conditions of production, and particularly the financial conditions, which allowed him to make a film like Hiroshima mon amour, his first feature film.

Resnais was more often associated with a "Left Bank" group of writers and filmmakers who included Agnès Varda, Chris Marker, Jean Cayrol, Marguerite Duras and Alain Robbe-Grillet (with all of whom he collaborated in the earlier part of his career). They were distinguished by their interests in documentary, left-wing politics, and the literary experiments of the nouveau roman. At the same time, Resnais was also a devotee of popular culture. He owned the largest private collection of comic books in France and in 1962 became the vice president and co-founder of an International Society for Comic Books, Le Club des bandes dessinées, renamed two years later as Centre d'Études des Littératures d'Expression Graphique (CELEG). CELEG members also included Resnais's artistic collaborators Marker and Robbe-Grillet.

The importance of creative collaboration in Resnais's films has been noted by many commentators. Unlike many of his contemporaries, he always refused to write his own screenplays and attached great importance to the contribution of his chosen writer, whose status in the shared "authorship" of the film he fully acknowledged. He was also known to treat the completed screenplay with great fidelity, to the extent that some of his screenwriters remarked on how closely the finished film realised their intentions. (On the few occasions when he did participate in writing the script, particularly for his last three films, his contribution is acknowledged under the pseudonym Alex Reval, since he did not want his name to appear more than once in the credits.)

Time and memory have regularly been identified as two of the principal themes of Resnais's work, at least in his earlier films. He however consistently tried to modify this view of his concerns: "I prefer to speak of the imaginary, or of consciousness. What interests me in the mind is that faculty we have to imagine what is going to happen in our heads, or to remember what has happened". He also described his films as an attempt, however imperfect, to approach the complexity of thought and its mechanism.

Another view of the evolution of Resnais's career saw him moving progressively away from a realistic treatment of 'big' subjects and overtly political themes towards films that are increasingly personal and playful. Resnais himself offered an explanation of this shift in terms of challenging what was the norm in filmmaking at the time: having made his early films when escapist cinema was predominant, he progressively felt the need to move away from exploration of social and political issues as that itself became almost the norm in contemporary cinema. Experimentation with narrative forms and genre conventions instead became a central focus of his films.

A frequent criticism of Resnais's films among English-language commentators has been that they are emotionally cold; that they are all about technique without grasp of character or subject, that his understanding of beauty is compromised by a lack of sensuousness, and that his seriousness of intent fails to communicate itself to audiences. Elsewhere however it is suggested that such views are partly based on a misreading of the films, especially his earlier ones, which has impeded an appreciation of the humour and irony which pervade his work; and other viewers have been able to make the connection between the film's form and its human dimension.

There is general agreement about Resnais's attachment to formalism in his approach to film; he himself regarded it as the starting point of his work, and usually had an idea of a form, or method of construction, in his head even before the plot or the characters took shape. For him this was also the basis for the communication of feeling: "There cannot be any communication except through form. If there is no form, you cannot create emotion in the spectator."

Another term which appears in commentaries on Resnais throughout his career is "surrealism", from his documentary portrait of a library in Toute la mémoire du monde, through the dreamlike innovations of Marienbad, to the latterday playfulness of Les Herbes folles. Resnais himself traced a link to his teenage discovery of surrealism in the works of André Breton: "I hope that I always remain faithful to André Breton who refused to suppose that imaginary life was not a part of real life".

== Personal life ==
In 1969 Resnais married Florence Malraux (daughter of the French statesman and writer André Malraux). She was a regular member of his production team, working as assistant director on most of his films from 1961 to 1986.

His second wife was Sabine Azéma, who acted in the majority of his films from 1983 onwards; they were married in the English town of Scarborough in 1998.

On his religious views, he called himself a "mystical atheist".

Resnais died in Neuilly-sur-Seine on 1 March 2014; he was buried in Montparnasse cemetery.

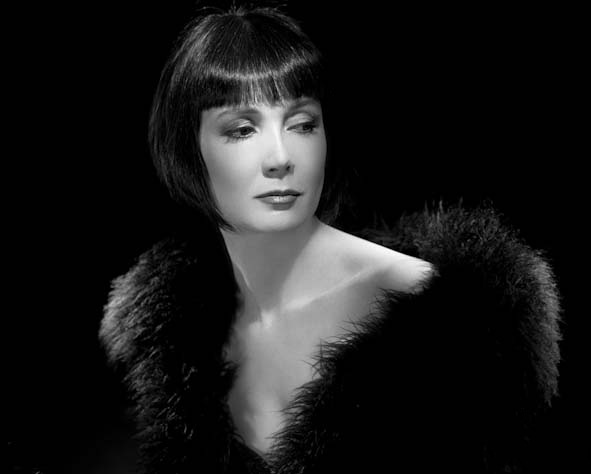
Sabine Azéma (1996).

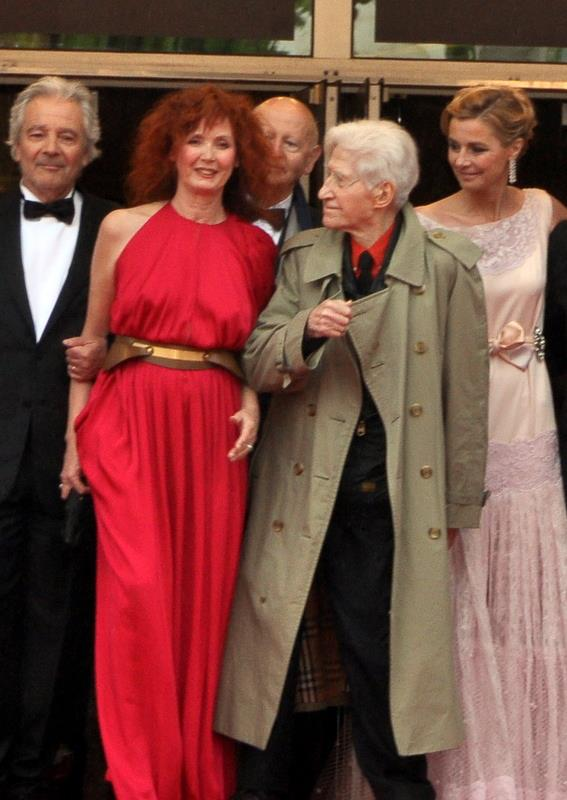
Azéma and Resnais at the 2012 Cannes Festival.

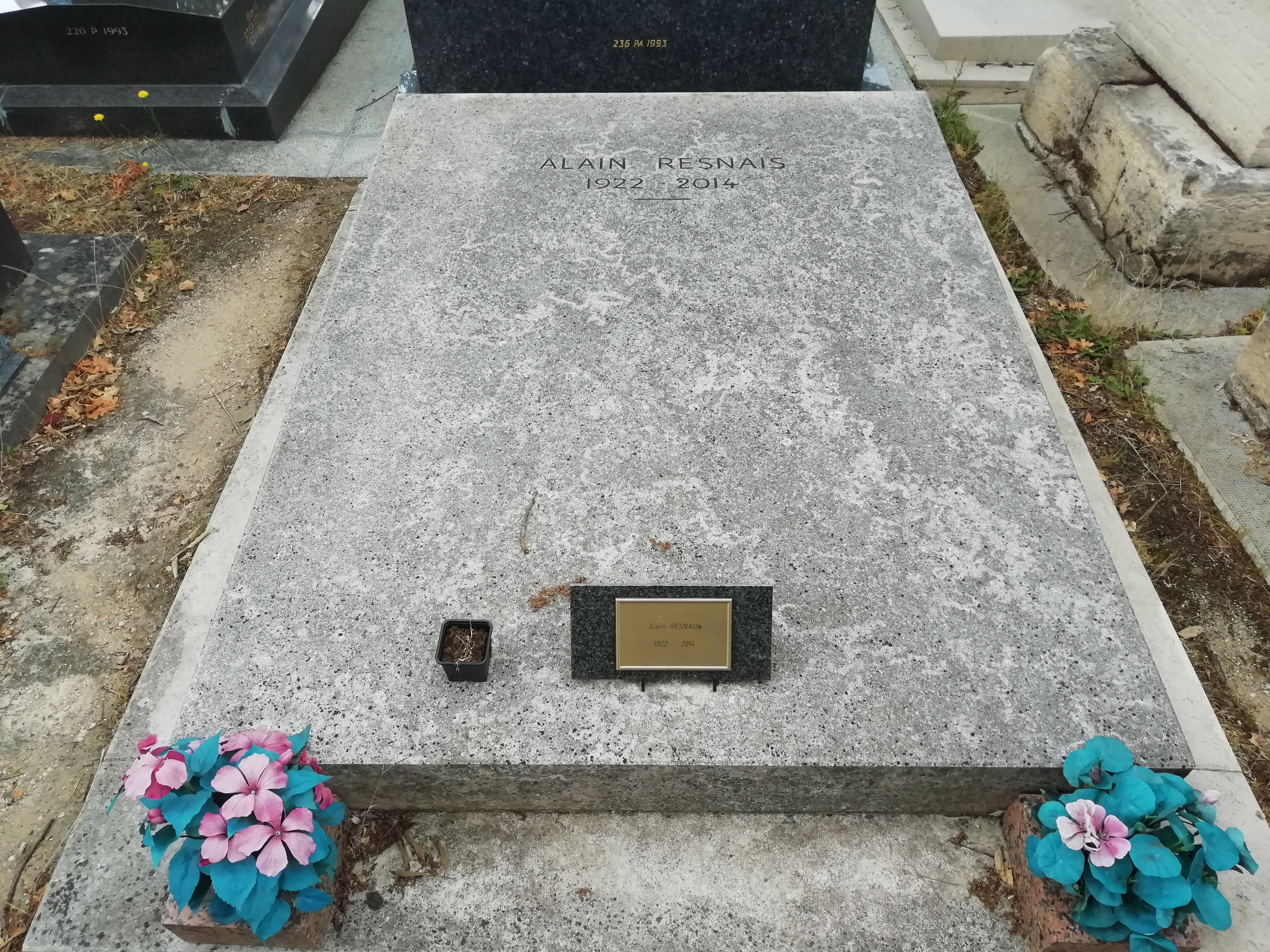
Resnais's tomb at Montparnasse cemetery (division 4).

== Awards ==
- Academy Award: 1950 (22nd Oscar ceremony) for "Van Gogh" (1948): Best Short Subject (two-reel), awarded to producers Gaston Diehl and Robert Haessens.
- Prix Jean Vigo: 1954, for Les statues meurent aussi; and 1956, for Nuit et Brouillard
- César Award: 1977 Best Director 1977, for Providence; and 1993 Best Director, for Smoking/No Smoking
- Prix Louis-Delluc: 1966, for La guerre est finie; 1993, for Smoking/No Smoking; and 1997, for On connaît la chanson
- Lumière Award for Best Director: 2004, for Pas sur la bouche
- Venice Film Festival: 1960 Golden Lion, for L'Année dernière à Marienbad; and 2006 Silver Lion, for Cœurs
- Berlin Film Festival: 1994 Silver Bear for Smoking/No Smoking; 1998 Silver Bear, for On connaît la chanson; 2014 Silver Bear Alfred Bauer Prize for Aimer, boire et chanter.
- Cannes Film Festival: 1980 Grand Prix, for Mon oncle d'Amérique; and 2009, Lifetime achievement award.

== Filmography, as director ==
=== Feature films ===
| Year | Title | English title | Screenwriter |
|---|---|---|---|
| 1959 | Hiroshima mon amour | Hiroshima mon amour | Marguerite Duras |
| 1961 | L'Année dernière à Marienbad | Last Year at (in) Marienbad | Alain Robbe-Grillet |
| 1963 | Muriel ou le Temps d'un retour | Muriel | Jean Cayrol |
| 1966 | La guerre est finie | The War Is Over | Jorge Semprún |
| 1968 | Je t'aime, je t'aime | I Love You, I Love You | Jacques Sternberg |
| 1974 | Stavisky... | Stavisky... | Jorge Semprún |
| 1977 | Providence | Providence | David Mercer |
| 1980 | Mon oncle d'Amérique | My American Uncle | Jean Gruault, (Henri Laborit) |
| 1983 | La vie est un roman | Life Is a Bed of Roses | Jean Gruault |
| 1984 | L'Amour à mort | Love Unto Death | Jean Gruault |
| 1986 | Mélo | Mélo | (Henri Bernstein) |
| 1989 | I Want to Go Home | I Want to Go Home | Jules Feiffer |
| 1993 | Smoking/No Smoking | Smoking/No Smoking | Jean-Pierre Bacri, Agnès Jaoui, (Alan Ayckbourn) |
| 1997 | On connaît la chanson | Same Old Song | Agnès Jaoui, Jean-Pierre Bacri |
| 2003 | Pas sur la bouche | Not on the Lips | (André Barde) |
| 2006 | Cœurs | Private Fears in Public Places | Jean-Michel Ribes, (Alan Ayckbourn) |
| 2009 | Les Herbes folles | Wild Grass | Alex Reval, Laurent Herbiet, (Christian Gailly) |
| 2012 | Vous n'avez encore rien vu | You Ain't Seen Nothin' Yet! | Laurent Herbiet, Alex Reval, (Jean Anouilh) |
| 2014 | Aimer, boire et chanter | Life of Riley | Laurent Herbiet, Alex Reval, (Alan Ayckbourn) |

=== Short films etc. ===
| Year | Title | Screenwriter | Notes |
|---|---|---|---|
| 1936 | L'Aventure de Guy | Gaston Modot | 10 mins. Unfinished. |
| 1946 | Schéma d'une identification | | 30 mins. Lost. |
| 1946 | Ouvert pour cause d'inventaire | | 90 mins. Lost. |
| 1947 | Visite à Oscar Dominguez | | 30 mins. Uncompleted. |
| 1947 | Visite à Lucien Coutaud | | |
| 1947 | Visite à Hans Hartung | | |
| 1947 | Visite à Félix Labisse | | |
| 1947 | Visite à César Doméla | | |
| 1947 | Portrait d'Henri Goetz | | |
| 1947 | Journée naturelle (Visite à Max Ernst) | | |
| 1947 | La Bague | | |
| 1947 | L'alcool tue | Remo Forlani, Roland Dubillard | Director credited as Alzin Rezarail. |
| 1947 | Le Lait Nestlé | | 1 min. |
| 1947 | Van Gogh (16mm) | Gaston Diehl, Robert Hessens | 20 mins. |
| 1948 | Van Gogh (35mm) | Gaston Diehl, Robert Hessens | 20 mins. |
| 1948 | Châteaux de France (Versailles) | | 5 mins. |
| 1948 | Malfray | Gaston Diehl, Robert Hessens | |
| 1948 | Les Jardins de Paris | Roland Dubillard | Unfinished. |
| 1950 | Gauguin | Gaston Diehl | 11 mins. |
| 1950 | Guernica | Paul Eluard | 12 mins. |
| 1951 | Pictura: An Adventure in Art (Gauguin segment) | | One of seven segments in US documentary. |
| 1953 | Les statues meurent aussi (Statues Also Die) | Chris Marker | 30 mins. Co-written and directed with Chris Marker. |
| 1956 | Nuit et Brouillard (Night and Fog) | Jean Cayrol | 32 mins. |
| 1956 | Toute la mémoire du monde | Remo Forlani | 22 mins. |
| 1957 | Le Mystère de l'atelier quinze | Chris Marker | 18 mins. |
| 1958 | Le Chant du styrène | Raymond Queneau | 19 mins. |
| 1967 | Loin du Vietnam (Far from Vietnam) – segment | Jacques Sternberg | "Claude Ridder" segment. |
| 1968 | Cinétracts – segment | | Uncredited. |
| 1973 | L'An 01 – segment | | New York scenes only. |
| 1991 | Contre l'oubli – segment | | Contribution called "Pour Esteban Gonzalez Gonzalez, Cuba". |
| 1992 | Gershwin | Edward Jablonski | TV film. 52 mins. |
