= Night and Fog (1956 film) =

- Film poster
- Directed by: Alain Resnais
- Written by: Jean Cayrol
- Produced by: Anatole Dauman
- Narrated by: Michel Bouquet
- Cinematography: Ghislain Cloquet; Sacha Vierny
- Edited by: Alain Resnais
- Music by: Hanns Eisler
- Distributed by: Argos Films
- Release date: 1956
- Running time: 32 minutes
- Country: France
- Language: French

Night and Fog (French: Nuit et brouillard) is a 1956 French documentary short film. Directed by Alain Resnais, it was made ten years after the liberation of Nazi concentration camps. The title is taken from the Nacht und Nebel (German for "Night and Fog") program of abductions and disappearances decreed by Nazi Germany. The documentary features the abandoned grounds of Auschwitz and Majdanek established in occupied Poland while describing the lives of prisoners in the camps. Night and Fog was made in collaboration with scriptwriter Jean Cayrol, a survivor of the Mauthausen-Gusen concentration camp. The music of the soundtrack was composed by Hanns Eisler.

Resnais was originally hesitant about making the film and refused the offer to make it until Cayrol was contracted to write the script. The film was shot entirely in the year 1955 and is composed of contemporary shots of the camps plus stock footage. Resnais and Cayrol found the film very difficult to make due to its graphic nature and subject matter. The film faced difficulties with French censors unhappy with a shot of a French police officer in the film, and with the German embassy in France, which attempted to halt the film's release at the Cannes Film Festival. Night and Fog was released to critical acclaim, and still receives very high praise today. It was re-shown on French television nationwide in 1990 to remind the people of the "horrors of war".

== Synopsis ==
The film alternates between past and present, using historical black-and-white and newly shot colour footage, respectively. The first part of Night and Fog shows remnants of Auschwitz while the narrator Michel Bouquet describes the rise of Nazi ideology. The film continues with comparisons of the life of the Schutzstaffel to the starving prisoners in the camps. Bouquet shows sadism inflicted upon the doomed inmates, including scientific and medical experiments, executions, and rape. The next section is shown completely in black-and-white, and depicts images of gas chambers and piles of bodies. The final topic of the film depicts the liberation of the country, the discovery of the horror of the camps, and the questioning of who was responsible for them.

== Production ==
=== Background and development ===
From 1954 to 1955, a number of activities took place in observance of the tenth anniversary of the liberation of France and of the concentration camps. One of these was an exhibition curated by Olga Wormser and Henri Michel, Resistance, Liberation, Deportation, which opened on 10 November 1954 at the Institut Pédagogique National (National Teaching Institute) in Paris. The exhibit was based on Michel and Wormser's monograph, which had been published earlier in 1954 in a special issue of Revue d'histoire de la Deuxième Guerre mondiale. The first public notice of a proposed film project was given during a radio broadcast on 10 November 1954, the opening day of the exhibition.

Although Michel was under pressure from veterans' organizations to create a film that would honor French Resistance fighters, Wormser argued for a scholarly approach that would show the concentration camps as a systematic microcosm of the German war economy. Michel recognized that this approach would enable broader financing, and both re-envisioned the film as "communicating historical research through contemporary media." Initially, Michel thought the film could take the form of a montage of news reports. But as a result of the exhibit Resistance, Liberation, Deportation, both he and Wormser had received many items created by former inmates during their internment. They came to believe that they could create a unique perspective by providing an inside view of the camps.

"The genocide of the Jews was treated in French remembrance as more of a side issue—something that was in any case supposedly a matter for the Jews themselves and not for the majority of society. Michel and Wormser might have wanted scholarly objectivity instead of the heroism favoured by the deportees' association...but nevertheless the Holocaust had remained a blind spot even for them."

Film producers Anatole Dauman, Samy Halfon, and Philippe Lifchitz were invited to this exhibit and felt that a film should be made on the subject. Anatole Dauman, originally from Warsaw, undertook the production for Argos Films and arranged for co-financing by Films Polski, the Polish state production company. Dauman approached filmmaker Alain Resnais, who had experience with documentary films since 1948. For more than a week, Resnais resisted the offer, believing that only someone with first-hand experience of concentration camps should attempt the subject matter.

Resnais eventually agreed, providing that poet and novelist Jean Cayrol, who had been a concentration camp prisoner, would collaborate on the project. Resnais officially signed his contract for the film on 24 May 1955. Cayrol had written in 1946 about his experience as a survivor of Mauthausen in Poèmes de la nuit et brouillard ("Poems of night and fog"), from which the documentary was titled. Resnais intended the film to warn of the horrors of Nazism, which he feared could be repeated during the Algerian War, during which torture and internment were already taking place.

The film was commissioned by two organizations: the first was the Comité d'histoire de la Deuxième Guerre mondiale (Committee on the history of the Second World War), a government commission assigned the tasks of assembling documentary material on, and of launching historical inquiries and studies of, the period of the French occupation from 1940 to 1945. The second was the Réseau du souvenir (Network of memory), an association devoted to the memory of those deported to camps. A pre-production meeting was held on 28 May 1955, during which participants decided "to explain clearly how the concentration-camp system (its economic aspect) flowed automatically from fascism". The film's working title, Resistance and Deportation, was changed to the French translation of the German term Nacht und Nebel (Night and Fog). This was the term for handling World War II prisoners according to a decree promulgated by Himmler on 7 December 1941. This decree provided that those resisting the Reich, who were arrested in their own countries but not promptly executed, would be deported to camps where they would vanish without a trace, "into the night and fog".

Another layer of meaning is expressed one quarter of the way through the film: Hanns Eisler's chilling score, which has accompanied images of deportation, is disrupted as the train arrives at Auschwitz. The narrator observes that during the train ride, "death makes its first choice" and "a second is made upon arrival in the night and fog". The visuals cut to a shot of trains arriving in night and fog, which has become a metaphor for the mystery of their situation.

=== Evolving structure of the film ===
Michel's and Wormser's 1954 exhibit Resistance, Liberation, Deportation was organized in nine parts:

1. The convoys
2. Arrival at the camp and quarantine
3. Daily life; atmosphere in the camp, the locations and camp sites, the schedule, hygiene, diet, a typical day
4. Work in the concentration camps, chores, factory work, secret war factories
5. Social categories in the camps, the SS, prisoner administration, the slaves
6. The permanence of humanity, spiritual life and resistance
7. The sick bay: the anteroom of death, medical organization, the camp pathology, human experiments
8. Death: the last station, "natural" death, induced death, massive exterminations
9. The camp evacuations and their liberation

This was adapted into seven parts for the first draft of the film (dating from late February/early March 1955):

1. Departure and arrival of the transports
2. Planning and organization of the camp
3. Sketch of the everyday life of a deportee
4. Work in a concentration camp
5. Sick bay and death
6. Escape and resistance
7. Liberation, return, reintegration and commemoration (pilgrimage to the camp)

The outline of the film changed dramatically when in April 1955, Wormser and Michel went to Poland to attend commemorations for the tenth anniversary of Auschwitz's liberation. They wanted to include film of how Auschwitz was currently seen. They were approached by Auschwitz museum staff, who supplied additional documentation and images. Visiting Poland gave Wormser and Michel the opportunity to make contact with Polish archives. The result was broadening the scope of the film from a nationalist view toward a broader European perspective.

Once Resnais joined the team, a new script (dated 11 June 1955) emerged with 12 sections:

1. The camp, deserted in 1956 (mixture of the four camps)
2. An "algebraic" history of Nazism
3. Himmler's visit to Dachau; All is in place, the mill starts to grind bones
4. The convoys
5. Arrival at the camp
6. Quarantine and daily life
7. The locations of the camp
8. Himmler's second visit; Continuation of the history of Nazism
9. The proliferation of the system
10. The techniques of extermination
11. The evacuation of the camps; What the Allies found
12. The Auschwitz Museum; The lesson to be learned

=== Filming ===
The film draws on several sources, including black-and-white still images from various archives, excerpts from older black-and-white films from French, Soviet, and Polish newsreels, footage shot by detainees of the Westerbork internment camp in the Netherlands, or by the Allies' "clean-up" operations, plus new color and black-and-white footage filmed in 1955 at concentration camps. Resnais filmed his color sequences in Eastmancolor rather than Agfacolor, using the footage to contrast the desolate tranquility of several concentration camps — Auschwitz, Birkenau, Majdanek, Struthof, and Mauthausen — with the horrific events that occurred there during World War II, to muse on the diffusion of guilt, and to pose the question of responsibility.

The film deals briefly with the conditions of prisoners, and shows disturbing footage of prisoners and dead victims in the camps. While Night and Fog states that the Nazis made soap from the corpses, giving the possible impression that this was done regularly, this claim is now considered untrue, with the exception of isolated cases. Researching and making the film were difficult for Resnais. He suffered nightmares during filming and found himself waking up screaming in the night. As Resnais began filming on site in Auschwitz, the nightmares ended.

From 29 September to 4 October 1955, Resnais and his crew filmed at Auschwitz-Birkenau. They next shot scenes at Majdanek from 7 to 10 October. For the archival material, Resnais had to use black-and-white footage, but did not receive any from English, German or French military sources. Some of the stock footage in the film is from Michel and Wormser's exhibit. Other stock footage is from the Rijksinstituut voor Oorlogsdokumentatie (National institute for war documentation) in the Netherlands, and from French television, Gaumont, and the association of former deportees.

Cayrol was aided by mutual friend and film maker Chris Marker while writing the commentary that was spoken by actor Michel Bouquet. After viewing the images in the editing room, Cayrol became nauseated and was unable to write further. Marker's contribution was to adapt the written text to the rhythm of the images in the film. While editing the film, Resnais felt general discomfort, saying that he "had scruples, knowing that making the film more beautiful would make it more moving - it upset me".

=== Scoring ===
Originally Wormser and Michel had wanted to use the song "Chant des Marais" (Peat Bog Soldiers) as a recurring leitmotif, as it was an authentic prisoner song. When Resnais joined the production team, he proposed having an original composed score. Chris Marker suggested approaching Hanns Eisler, to which Resnais agreed after hearing a recording of his music. Although concerned that the composer's fee would put the film over budget, producer Dauman was supportive. Eisler was invited to compose the music by Argos Films on 18 October 1955, which offered him 200,000 francs and help in obtaining a visa to enter France. Resnais also sent Eisler a "lyrical" letter. In what Resnais considered a stroke of luck, Eisler opened the letter in the presence of Vladimir Pozner, who was familiar with Resnais and urged Eisler to accept the offer immediately. Eisler agreed to do it by telegram on 25 October.

Eisler arrived in Paris on 30 November 1955. In a letter to his wife Louise he wrote:

The film is grandiose, horrible, showing monstrous crimes...regrettably, the film people here are putting me under pressure to finish the whole thing in ten days even though the film is barely finished. I hope I can get it all together. I'm living here like a monk, I go to bed at 8 in the evening, eat and drink very little and don't feel at all at ease in this giant city with all the responsibility for the film.

Recording took place on 19 December 1955. Sound editing was completed on 24 December 1955.

The overture in the score had been written before Eisler was offered work on the film. It had been written for Johannes R. Becher's play Winterschlacht (Winter Battle), which had its premiere on 12 January 1955. Eisler's inspiration for this piece was Horatio's monologue from Hamlet, which Eisler had read in Karl Kraus' Weltgericht. Eisler later reworked the overture into his song Monolog Horatio's (Hamlet).

Eisler considered the possibility of conceiving of his music to Night and Fog as a separate orchestral work, although this never came to fruition. He reused portions of the music for his incidental music to The Days of the Commune (Die Tage der Commune) and William Tell (Wilhelm Tell).

The orchestra was directed by french film composer Georges Delerue.

The score was published for the first time in 2014 as part of the Hanns Eisler Gesamtausgabe (Hanns Eisler Complete Edition).

=== Post-production and censorship ===
A still from Night and Fog, showing a French police officer, identifiable by his kepi, guarding the Pithiviers deportation camp. This shot was censored in some versions of the film.

Censored version of the image, with a support partially obscuring the distinctive headwear

After the film was complete, producer Dauman told Resnais that he was "delighted to have produced the film", but that he guaranteed that "It will never see a theatrical release". In December 1955, French censors wanted some scenes cut from Night and Fog. The end of the film showed scenes of bodies being bulldozed into mass graves, which some censors considered too horrifying to be allowed in the film.

Another point of contention was that Resnais had included photographs of French officers guarding a detention center where Jews were gathered before deportation; it was operated by the collaborationist Vichy government located in central France. This scene prompted a call demanding that the shot be cut because it "might be offensive in the eyes of the present-day military". Resnais resisted this censorship, insisting that images of collaboration were important for the public to see. When Resnais refused to cut the French officer scene, the censors threatened to cut the last ten minutes of his film. Finally in compromise, Resnais said that obscuring the contested scene would not change the meaning of the film to him. He painted a fake support beam to obscure the distinctive képi worn by the French officer. In exchange, Resnais was allowed to show the bodies of victims at the end of the film. The censored scene was restored to its original form for a 2003 DVD release.

The second attempted censorship of the film arose when the German embassy in France asked for the film to be withdrawn from the Cannes Film Festival. The French press reacted negatively to the proposed withdrawal, noting that Cayrol and Resnais had been careful to define the difference between Nazi criminals and the German people. Articles were written in French magazines including Libération and L'Humanité, protesting any censorship of the film at Cannes. One of the few writers who supported the withdrawal, Jean Dutourd, felt that Auschwitz and other concentration camps should be forgotten.

Contrary to concerns over the film inciting anti-German hate, the film was shown across many major cities in Germany just months later. Willy Brandt, President of the Berlin House of Commons came out in explicit support of the film and the Paul Bausch, chairman of the Federal Bureau for the Press, Film and Radio, proposed that there should be free screenings for all civil servants in Germany.

== Release ==
A local association of former deported prisoners insisted that the film be shown at Cannes, threatening to occupy the screening room in their camp uniforms unless the festival showed the film. On 26 April 1956 the film was announced to be shown out of competition at Cannes. Night and Fog was shown in commercial theaters in Paris, in May 1956. The film was awarded the 1956 Jean Vigo Prize, a French award for young filmmakers.

Night and Fog was shown on French television as early as 26 April 1959.

On 10 May 1990 a Jewish cemetery at Carpentras was desecrated, and the body of a freshly buried man, Felix Germont, impaled on a stake. Response was strong to this act. Night and Fog was broadcast on all three of the French national television channels at the same time to remind viewers of what took place under the Nazis. The film has been shown since 1991 as a teaching tool in schools in France.

=== Critical reception ===
The film received very high acclaim in France on its initial release. Jacques Doniol-Valcroze wrote in Cahiers du Cinéma that the film was a powerful work comparable to the work of artists Francisco Goya and Franz Kafka. French film critic and director François Truffaut referred to Night and Fog as the greatest film ever made. In his film, Une femme Mariée (A Married Woman), Jean-Luc Godard shows the film playing in the cinema where the lovers have their assignation.

Modern reception has also been positive. Todd Gitlin describes it as "an unbearable apotheosis of desolation that speaks to the necessity of our making a mental effort to grasp what is impossible to grasp—a duty that has been imposed upon us by history."

Rotten Tomatoes reported that 100% of critics had given the film a positive rating, based on 25 reviews, with a weighted average of 9.1/10.

As Nitzan Lebovic pointed out, the film was not received as well in Israel; Resnais's universalist approach drew some criticism that reached the Israeli Knesset (the Israeli parliament), immediately after its arrival, in 1956. A political debate opened around the film, dividing supporters and opponents between religious and secular, Ashkenazi and Sepharadi, right wing and left wing, or—as Lebovic showed—between centrists and radicals from both ends of the political map. A centrist demand to ban the film resulted with a small and a limited release until the end of the 1970s.

In a 2014 Sight and Sound poll, film critics voted Night and Fog the fourth best documentary film of all time.

=== German versions ===
On 29 June 1956, a contract was signed between Argos Films and the German Office for Press and Information (West Germany) to produce a German language version of the film. Jean Cayrol wished that Paul Celan serve as translator. Despite alterations requested by the German Federal Press Office, Celan refused to change the text. Celan's translation was recorded by narrator Kurt Glass in Paris on 26 October 1956.

Although shown during the Leipzig Film Week in November 1956, the East German state film company DEFA accused Celan of mistranslation—a pretext for creating a version of the text in line with the communist ideals of East Germany. Upon realization that Film Polski owned the distribution rights to the film for the Eastern Bloc, DEFA went ahead and produced a German-language version with a translation by Henryk Keisch, recorded by Raimund Schelcher. Argos Film's dissatisfaction with DEFA and Film Polski's action led to non-renewal of the film's license, resulting in this version of the film shown only between 1960 and 1963.

In 1974, Night and Fog was telecast in East Germany in a series "Films Against Fascism". A new German translation was desired, but as the original film soundtrack components were unavailable, a completely new audio track was created. Evelin Matschke wrote the text, basing it on the French audio track, which was read by Erwin Geschonneck. Manfred Grabs (of the Academy of Arts, Berlin, where Eisler's manuscripts are held) prepared new performance materials. The orchestral score was recorded by the Berlin Radio Symphony Orchestra (East Berlin) with Eugen Schneider conducting.

=== Home media ===
A DVD edition of Night and Fog was released by The Criterion Collection on 23 June 2003. It restores the scene of the French officer that was censored in France on the film's initial release. The film was released on Blu-ray in 2016, remastered in 4K from the original camera negative.

== Historical accuracy ==
The film relates that the Nazis used human corpses to make soap, a claim now seen by modern scholarship as a myth arising from wartime rumours.

== Cultural influences ==
Alan Pakula studied Night and Fog when he was writing the 1982 film adaptation of Sophie’s Choice, William Styron's 1979 novel about a Polish-Catholic survivor of Auschwitz.

Nagisa Oshima titled his 1960 film Night and Fog in Japan after Resnais's film. Though Night and Fog had not premiered in Japan until 1963, Oshima had read about the film and titled his work before seeing Resnais's version.

Michael Haneke criticized films such as Downfall (2004) and Schindler's List (1993) for manipulating the audience to perceive events subjectively and not giving any room for an objective point of view. In contrast, he praised Night and Fog for its portrayal of such historical events.

== See also ==
- List of Holocaust films
