= Anatole Dauman =

French film producer (1925–1998)

Anatole Dauman (7 February 1925 in Warsaw – 8 April 1998 in Paris) was a French film producer. He produced films by Jean-Luc Godard, Robert Bresson, Wim Wenders, Nagisa Oshima, Andrei Tarkovsky, Chris Marker, Volker Schlöndorff, Walerian Borowczyk, and Alain Resnais.

He was a principal figure in Argos Films, a company that was a very important vehicle in creating opportunities for the "Left Bank" filmmakers to emerge from the overall Nouvelle Vague.

== Early life and career ==
Anatole Dauman was born in Warsaw in 1925 to a Russian Jewish family and later emigrated to France.

In 1951, he formed Argos Films with Philippe Lifchitz. It was a niche production company with the aim of making films on art which were inspired by the work of the Italian documentary filmmaker Luciano Emmer. Dauman produced the first films of Pierre Kast, Jean Aurel and Chris Marker. In 1953, they gained an advance from a distributor that enabled them to produce Alexander Astruc's Crimson Curtain, which received a prime a la qualite. After that they produced Alain Resnais' Night and Fog and two films by Chris Marker, Sunday in Peking and Letter from Siberia.

In 1959, Argos initiated the production of Resnais' Hiroshima mon amour. They also produced Resnais' Last Year at Marienbad. They also produced Chronique d'un été (Chronicle of a Summer) by Jean Rouch and the sociologist Edgar Morin, a documentary which pioneered cinéma vérité. Morin wrote an article describing the film as neither a documentary nor sociology in the January 1960 France-Observateur, he explained that it wasn't intended to describe, rather it is an experience lived by its authors and actors. Dauman went on to produce two films for Jean-Luc Godard - Masculin, féminin (1966) and Two or Three Things I Know About Her (1967). Argos also produced two by Robert Bresson, Au hasard Balthazar (1966) and Mouchette (1967).
