= Black Box International Festival =

The Black Box International Theatre and Dance Festival (Bulgarian: Международен фестивал за театър и съвременен танц „Черната кутия“) has taken place every spring in Plovdiv, Bulgaria since 2007. It lasts for one week and is centered on theater and contemporary dance.

The first edition of the festival in 2007 was hosted in the Hindliyan House-Museum in the Old town of Plovdiv. The event was supported by the Plovdiv Municipality, the Cultural Institute "Old Plovdiv" and the Ministry of Culture of Bulgaria. The focus of the first edition was to give the floor to female performers only.

The festival's ninth edition in 2015, with its 600 applications for participation, is reportedly the first major cultural event which takes place after the official designation of Plovdiv as European Capital of Culture for the year 2019. The festival is considered to be "one of the most valuable international events for theater and contemporary dance" that take place in Bulgaria. Partners in the organization of the Black Box Festival'2014 are the Ministry of Culture, Plovdiv Municipality, the Embassies of Austria, Belgium, Israel and United States, The Italian Culture Institute, The Polish Institute, The Hungarian Cultural Institute, Plovdiv Culture House "Boris Hristov", Plovdiv Drama Theatre, Municipal Institute "Old Plovdiv" and Trakart Culture Centre. In 2015, the history of the festival is shown with a photo gallery that is publicly installed in the central pedestrian zone of Plovdiv.

== History ==
2017 - 11th festival

- Opening: Joséphina, by Sandrine Heyraud and Sicaire Durieux, ChaliWate Company, Belgium
- Contemporary Dance Program:
  - iShade, by the Jade Dance Theatre, Taiwan
  - Before Sunrise, by Hsiao-Wei Hsieh & Hsiao-Ting Hsieh, InTW Studio, Тaiwan
  - 360º, iMEE Dance Company, USA
  - Suites, by Tomas Danielis, Austria
- Program Plovdiv in Focus:
  - _WръZки_, by Yanitsa Atanasova
  - I, the Lie, by the Pantarey Dance Studio
  - ... point. Point of view, by the Duende Dance Studio
- Smoke like a man, solo Performance by Yafit Levi, Israel
- Queen of Spades, State Puppet Theatre, Plovdiv, Bulgaria
- Helicopter, a documentary film about Kolio Karamfilov, directed by Krum Philipov
- Blue eyes black hair, by Irena Ivanova, based on works by Marguerite Duras and Vladislav Hristov
- Couchettes by Alain Giroud, performed by Fractorium Dei Movement Theater, Bulgaria
- Contemporary Ballet Master Class with iMEE Dance Company, USA
- Contemporary Dance and Bulgarian Folklore workshop with Rara Avis Dance Company, Bulgaria
- Closing: Evening Shadow, by Alessandro Serra, performed by Chiara Michelini, Teatropersona Company, Italy

2016 - 10th festival

- Opening: Apartheid, by Étienne Béchard, Opinion Public Company, Belgium
- Contemporary Dance Program:
  - De-parts by Miriam Engel
  - No Hands by Miriam Engel
  - love-joy diver, by Megan Mazarick and Les Rivera, USA
- Bitter-Sweet, performed by Gustavo Hoyos and Jerome Leperlier, Umami Theatre & Dance Project, Spain
- Blood Wedding, solo performance by Maria Vidal, Abrego Theatre, Spain
- 6 rooms, a joint dance project by Boriana Tengulova, Maya Pavlova, Maria Ivanova, Elena Zdravkova and Ivaylo Ivanov, Denitsa Gergenikova and Dragomir Yordanov, Bulgaria
- Crazy Glue, inspired by Etgar Keret, Single Shoe Productions, United Kingdom
- The Samsas, inspired by Franz Kafka, directed by Katya Petrova, Theatre Laboratory Sfumato, Bulgaria
- Master class with Tomas Danielis, Austria
- Closing: Expanding Foam, by Gabriella Catalano & Paolo Rosini, Bambula Project, United Kingdom/Italy

2015 - 9th festival

- Opening: How I Managed Not to Flatten My Husband, choreographed by Anne Lopez, Les Gens du quai Company, Montpellier, France
- Earth and Tales in Black and White by Andrea Hackl, Austria
- OOups by Jordi L. Vidal Company, Belgium
- World Wide Violin by Frédéric Tari, France
- Birds Never Sleep, PTAH Theatre, Hungary
- Why I Killed My Mother by Dor Zweigenbom, Israel
- contemporary dance program:
  - Ivonice, Untitled & The secret of life is to fall seven times & get up eight, works by Andrea Dawn Shelley and Spencer Gavin Hering, iMEE Dance Company, United States of America
  - The Perfect World, solo by Bartech Woszczynski, Poland
  - Morgan & Freeman by Ferenc Fehér, Hungary
  - Slipstream by Mihaela Griveva, Bulgaria/Ireland
- Program “Plovdiv in Focus”:
  - So Close, Duende Dance Studio, Bulgaria
  - Apathy by Denitsa Gerginkova, Pantarey Studio, Bulgaria
  - Loneliness by Boryana Tеngulova, Bulgaria
  - Escurial, Theatre Hand, Bulgaria
- Naveneva, Naturalis Labor Company, Italy
- Closing: Other Side by Dejan Dukovski, choreographed and directed by Fenia Apostolou, Lydia Lithos Dance Theatre, Greece

2014 - 8th festival

- Opening: Bob’Art by Étienne Béchard, Opinion Public Company, Belgium
- The Woman Who Didn’t Want to Come Down to Earth – a trilogy by Gabrielle Neuhaus, Israel
- Brecht by Toma Markov, Bulgaria
- contemporary dance program:
  - Alma, duet by Rachel Erdos
  - Prism solo by Andrea Hackl, Netherlands
  - Exit solo by Olga Kosterina, Russia
  - from the festival “euro-scene” in Leipzig:
    - Bim bam bum, performed by Justyna Kalbarczyk, choreographed by Bridie Gane
    - Dark Quark by Irina Demina, Hamburg, Germany
- Immured by Veselka Kuncheva, Contrast Films LTD and State Puppet Theatre, Plovdiv, Bulgaria
- PASS/AGES by Elena R. Marino, Teatrincorso, Italy
- Monologue for Two, Duende Dance Studio, Bulgaria
- Weathered/Layers, Erica Essner Performance Co-Op, New York
- Closing: Duel, choreographed by Anne Lopez, Les Gens du quai Company, Montpellier, France

2013 - 7th festival

- Opening: Two of Us, directed and performed by Ana Pepine and Paul Cimpoieru, Passe-Partout D.P. Theatre Company, Romania
- Program “Contemporary dance and performance”:
  - Mi arma solo by Laila Tafur, Spain
  - Adi el-Rabi, duet dance by Orly Portal and Shlomit Yossef, Israel
  - Plant B by Ilona Roth, performed by Anna Majder and Marina Mazaraki, Transitheart Productions, Germany
  - Play.Back.Again.Then. by Ji-Eun Lee, United Kingdom/Korea
  - Souvenir, solo by Julia Danzinger, Austria
  - About Me and a Bit about You, solo by Liwia Bargieł, Poland
  - Second Hand Landscapes by Cristina Goletti and Nick Bryson, Legitimate Bodies Dance Company, Ireland
  - Zona de arribo, solo by Nidia Barbieri, Argentina/Italy
  - Svarta Rosor, individuo by Mieke Segers and Yentl de Werdt, Sacred Places, Belgium
- Program “Plovdiv in Focus”:
  - Ego by Ivo Ignatov-Kenny, Theatre Hand, Bulgaria
  - Glass by Elena Aleksieva, directed by Kalin Angelov, performed by Ivana Papazova
  - The Road/Trail, Duende Dance Studio, Bulgaria
- Closing: Gagarin’s Daughters, Mobil Teatr Lab, Hungary

2012 - 6th festival

- Opening: Dilemma, solo performance by Olga Kosterina, Moscow, Russia
- Wild Green by Dimitar Atanasov, directed by Nikolay Georgiev, Alma Alter Theatre-Laboratory, Bulgaria
- Prophecy, based on texts by Peter Handke and Vesselin Dimov, directed by Vesselin Dimov, MOMO Theatre Company, Sofia, Bulgaria
- Penthesilea (Pathologie), video performance by Evy Schubert, Berlin, Germany
- Mo(ve)ment by Tali Farchi, painting, and Benno Hübner, dance, Israel/Holland Art Collective
- Misery by Iván Rojas, Atomic Theatre Company, Spain/Chile
- Contemporary dance program “Body and Rhythm”:
  - Calypso by Noa Shadur, Tel Aviv, Israel
  - Juanita Hildegard Bo, solo performance by Galina Borissova, Sofia, Bulgaria
  - Tessitura, solo performance by Lucille Teppa, London, England
  - Bluebird, solo performance by Rosa Mei, 13 Dance Troupe, Belgium
  - Nothing for Body, solo performance by Howool Baek, Germany/Korea

2011 - 5th festival

- Opening: Odysseus Chaoticus by Masha Nemirovsky, Ish Theatre, Israel
- Birth Mark by Mimoza Bazova, Sfumato Laboratory Theatre, Bulgaria
- The Woman I Could Have Been, written and performed by Inbal Lori, directed by Shmulik Levi, Israel
- The Heart Made a Mess by Juan Luis Mira, Diáfano Theatre Company, Spain
- Nevena and the Night by Georgi Toshev, Bulgaria
- The Stone Guest by Alexander Pushkin, directed by Olesya Nevmerzhitskaya, A. N. Ostrovsky Theatre, Russia

2010 - 4th festival

- Opening: Bleeding, written and directed by Yaron Kerbel, The Room Theatre, Israel
- The Impossible You, The Impossible Me by Nikolay Georgiev, @lma @lter Theatre-Laboratory, Bulgaria
- Oedipus: The Celebration of the Blinding by Ruslan Kudasov, coproduction by the Plovdiv, Stara Zagora and Burgas Puppet Theatres, Bulgaria
- The Overcoat by Nikolai Gogol, directed by Ivan Kovachev, Zig Zag Theatre Company, Bulgaria
- Scenes of Family Life, based on three novels by Anton Chekhov, directed by Olga Vasilieva, Ostrovsky Drama Theatre, Moscow, Russia
- The Suitcase Play by Federico Nieto – El’ Gazi, directed by Margarita Amarantidi, βλακlist International Theatre Group, Greece – Colombia
- The Girl With the Nine Wigs, based on the autobiography of Sophie van der Stap, directed by Mina Salehpour, Schauspiel Frankfurt, Germany

2009 - 3rd festival
Velyo Goranov, special guest

- Words of Silence by Laurent Decol, France
- The Line by Tarick Markovich, Bosnia-Herzegovina
- Mira Mirrors by Nilson Muniz, Brazil
- The Smile by Mania Papadimitriou, Greece
- Pilgrim by Elian Valaji, Israel

2008 - 2nd festival

- Lazaritsa by Yordan Radichkov, directed by Krikor Azaryan, Tear and Laughter Theatre, Bulgaria
- I’m Not Dreyfus, written and directed by Yehoshua Sobol, Chamber Theatre, Tel Aviv, Israel
- Futurological Congress by Stanisław Lem, directed by Marcel Luxinger, Schauspiel Frankfurt, Germany
- The Diary of a Madman by Nikolai Gogol, directed by Takis Zamaryas, Onstage Art Theatre, Athens, Greece
- Hooligan’s Confession by Sergei Yesenin, directed by Valeriy Taganski, Taganka Theatre, Moscow, Russia
- M. Ibrahim and the Flowers of the Koran by Éric-Emmanuel Schmitt, directed by Snezhina Tankovska, Ivan Vazov National Theatre, Sofia, Bulgaria

2007 - 1st festival: The curator is the Bulgarian director Krikor Azaryan

- Oscar and the Lady in Pink by Éric-Emmanuel Schmitt, directed by Yordan Slaveykov, Vratza Drama Theatre, Bulgaria
- Nothing More Beautiful by Oliver Bukovski, directed by Mladen Alexiev, Nikolay Binev Youth Theatre, Sofia, Bulgaria
- Martin, Dancho and Their Mother, written and directed by Kamen Donev, Ivan Vazov National Theatre, Sofia, Bulgaria
- Partly It’s About Love, Partly It’s About Killing by Fiona Sprott, directed by Stilyan Petrov, Ivan Vazov National Theatre, Sofia, Bulgaria
- Obsessed by Koraksia Kortez, directed by Marcel Luxinger, Schauspiel Frankfurt, Germany
