= Donev =

Donev is a Bulgarian surname. Notable people with the surname include:

- Asparuh "Paro" Donev Nikodimov (born 1945), former Bulgarian football player and coach
- Doncho Donev (born 1967), retired Bulgarian professional footballer
- Donyo Donev (1929–2007), Bulgarian animator, director, art director and cartoonist
- Gabriel Donev (born 1996), Bulgarian tennis player
- Galab Donev (born 1967), Bulgarian politician
- Georgi Donev (born 1958), Bulgarian wrestler
- Hristo Donev or Donchev (born 1932), former Bulgarian basketball player
- Ivo Donev (born 1959), Bulgarian professional chess and poker player
- Kamen Donev (born 1971), Bulgarian actor, film director, dramaturgist, and choreographer
- Nikolay Donev (born 1957), Bulgarian football coach and former footballer
- Plamen Donev (born 1956), manager and former Bulgarian footballer
- Ronald Donev (born 1991), Bulgarian footballer
