= Oscar and the Lady in Pink =

Oscar and the Lady in Pink may refer to:

- Oscar and the Lady in Pink (novel)
- Oscar and the Lady in Pink (film), film based on the novel
