= New Penguin Shakespeare =

Series of works of William Shakespeare

Cover design by David Gentleman for A Midsummer Night's Dream (1977)

New Penguin Shakespeare is a series of the works of William Shakespeare published from 1967 to 1987 as an imprint of Penguin Books. Printed in paperback the editions were very popular in schools where they were used for teaching Shakespeare.

This series took over from the Penguin Shakespeare "B" series edited by G. B. Harrison, which ran from April 1937 to September 1959 with 37 titles and which sold over 1.5 million copies. The "New Penguin Shakespeare" series ("NS") was edited by Terence Spencer and started in April 1967 with NS1 Romeo and Juliet. The books were accompanied by a new series of Shakespeare commentaries printed under the title "The Penguin Shakespeare Library" ("SL"), while on the spines of a few books in the prefix "PNS" has been used. A Midsummer Night's Dream, Richard II and The Comedy of Errors were edited by Stanley Wells while Richard III was edited by G. Blakemore Evans.

The New Penguin Shakespeare series offered a complete edition of Shakespeare's plays and sonnets. "Each volume has been prepared from the original texts and includes an introduction, a list of further reading, a full and helpful commentary, and a short account of the textual problems of the play."

At least four different series of covers were used over the 20 years the series was published. The covers for 31 of the first series featured woodcut print illustrations by English artist David Gentleman that placed his distinctive bold designs on a white background with the title in a simple Helvetica font. Gentleman worked on the covers from 1967 to 1977. The artist Pierre Clayette provided six covers for editions in the second series. Other covers in the series included 38 for series three by Paul Hogarth; Louisa Hare provided 30 designs for series four, with simple but effective designs of plain text on yellow or bluish background together with a drawing in Elizabethan-style rather like medieval engravings.

The series lists 38 volumes over the 20 years it was published from "NS1" to "NS41" but there are several gaps (33, 39–40). Venus and Adonis, Titus Andronicus and Cymbeline were not published in the series and the latter two were not published until 2001 and 2005 respectively in the current "Penguin Shakespeare" (with cover designs by Clare Melinsky) that superseded the New Penguin Shakespeare series.
