= Les Gens du Quai =

General information
- Name: Les Gens du Quai
- Year founded: 1993
- Founders: Anne Lopez & François Lopez
- Website: gensduquai.org

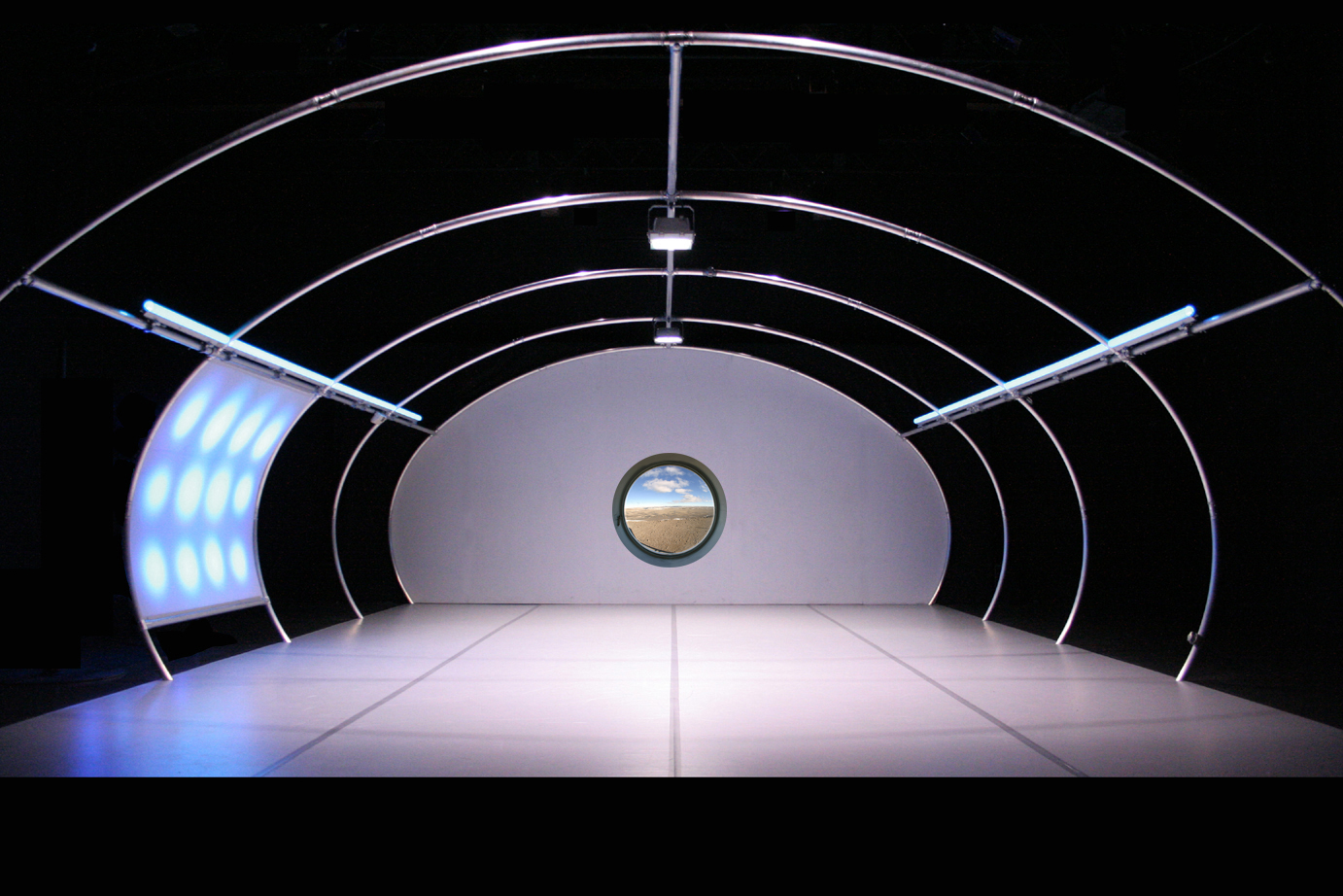
Idiots mais Rusés (stage set)

Les Gens du Quai (in English People of the Quay) is a Contemporary dance company founded in 1993 in Montpellier, France.

It is directed by its co-founders, Anne Lopez (choreographer, dancer) and François Lopez (composer, performer), who are brother and sister.

Besides their choreographic creations, performances and concerts, the Gens du Quai offer workshops in schools, medico-educational or psychiatric institutions.

Anne Lopez, who received in 2004 the prize of the new choreographic talent of the Société des Auteurs et Compositeurs Dramatiques for her piece De l'avant invariablement, is also a teacher and a lecturer.

== Works ==
=== Choreographic creations ===
- Paradox (2016)
- Trident (2016)
- Celui d'à côté (2015)
- Comment j'ai réussi à ne pas aplatir mon mari (2015)
- Miracle (2013)
- Mademoiselle Lopez (solo, 2012)
- Feu à volonté (2010)
- Duel (2009)
- La Menace (2008)
- Idiots mais Rusés (2007)
- Face à vous (2005)
- De l'avant invariablement (2004)
- Litanies (2002)
- De l'autre (solo, 2002)
- Révoltes (2000)
- Écoute œnone (solo, 1999)
- L'Invité (1999)
- Meeting (1998)

=== Performances ===
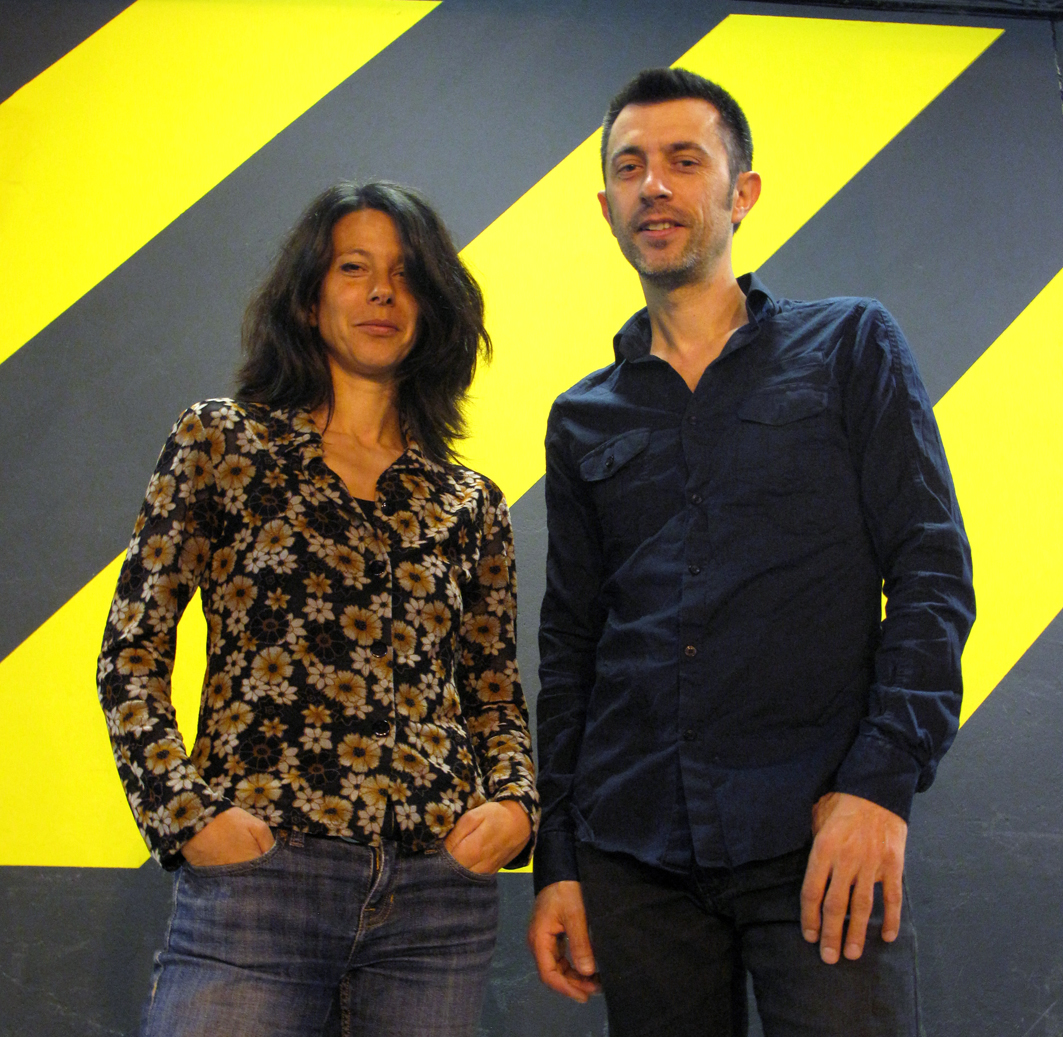
Anne Lopez et François Lopez

- Le Grand Direct (2009)
- Potlatch
- Organic
- Pixels
- Vox populi
- Petite ligne
- La Ligne jaune

=== Films ===
- 10 Petits Danseurs
- Les Géographes, ceux qui écrivent l'espace

=== Web ===
- Menace-TV

=== Concert ===
- Le Concert Insolite (Frédéric Tari & François Lopez)

== Distribution ==
Except their country of origin, the Gens du Quai showed their work:

- in Slovakia (Meeting, during the "Tanec Dnes" festival in Banská Bystrica),
- in Bosnia and Herzegovina (Révoltes, during the European young artists biennale in Sarajevo, July 2001),
- in Bulgaria :
  - Duel, for the 2014 Black Box International Festival in Plovdiv,
  - Le Concert insolite, during the 2015 Black Box International Festival,
  - Comment j'ai réussi à ne pas aplatir mon mari, for the same festival's opening,
- in Brazil (Celui d'à côté, premiere in Rio de Janeiro, October 2015).
