= Pierre Clayette =

French painter (1930–2005)

Pierre Clayette in his studio

Pierre Clayette (24 March 1930–18 December 2005) was a French painter, etcher and lithographer, illustrator and scenographer. Active for five decades, much of his work was architectural in style.

== Biography ==
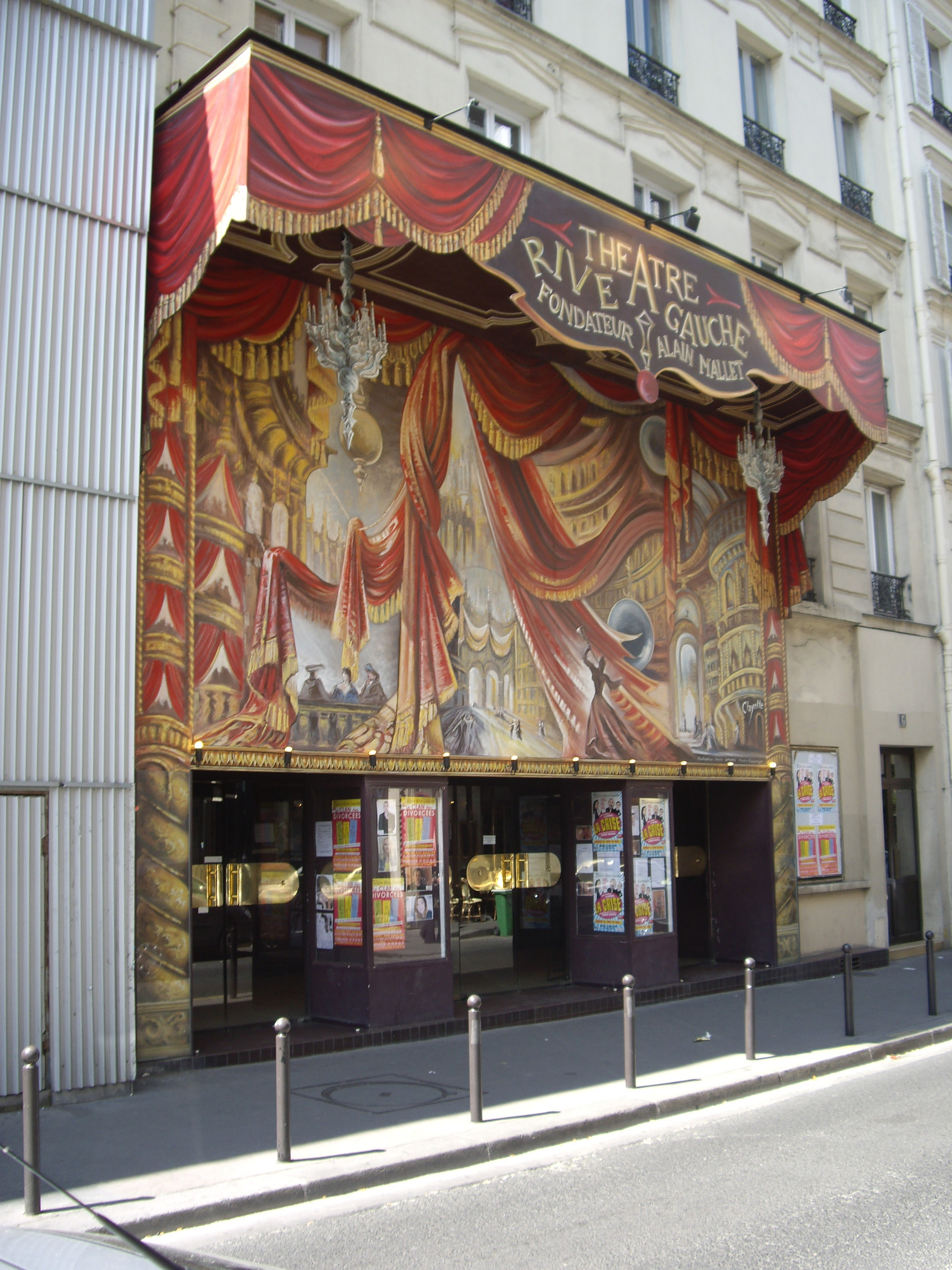
Façade of the Théâtre Rive Gauche in Paris decorated by Clayette in 1994

Born in Paris in 1930, after high school Clayette attended the Académie Julian where he studied under Jules Cavaillès. On leaving the Académie he was recruited by Cassandre to work in his studio. Clayette's first known professional work was in the mid 1950s. From 1960 he explored a different artistic theme each year, exhibiting virtually continuously each year successively until the early 1990s at the Galerie Charpentier, the Galerie Roger Dulac, the Galerie Emmanuel David and the Galerie Proscenium. At the same time, he collaborated with the magazine Planète as a draftsman, and illustrated the covers or the text of books including the works of Shakespeare (including the series New Penguin Shakespeare), Goethe, Rimbaud, Kafka, etc. In the early 1960s, dramatist Jean Anouilh introduced Clayette to the stage actor and director Jean Le Poulain as "A painter of the waking dream".

For Planète he illustrated the poems of Victor Hugo; he also illustrated the works of H. P. Lovecraft and Jorge Luis Borges in the Fantasy Realism style. However, like many artists who at one point in their career were associated with the movement such as Pierre-Yves Trémois, Clayette's pictorial production did not stop at the themes of Fantasy Realism. Although the unusual is a constant of his work, it draws its references in many artistic currents including Romanticism, Baroque, Symbolism, etc.

Clayette died in Colombes in France in 2005 aged 75.

== Exhibitions ==
=== Personal exhibitions ===
- The Tower of Babel, Galerie Roger Dulac, Paris, 1961.
- The Unusual Navigation, Galerie Roger Dulac, Paris, 1962.
- Faust and Spells, Galerie Roger Dulac, Paris, 1963.
- Unexpected Visitors, Galerie Roger Dulac, Paris, 1964.
- The Plant World, Galerie Roger Dulac, Paris, 1965.
- Gallery of Argens, Strasbourg, 1967.
- Theater of the Imaginary, Galerie Emmanuel David, Paris, 1972.
- Denon Museum, Chalon-sur-Saône, 1972.
- Other Faces, Galerie Emmanuel David, Paris, 1973.
- Lost naked in the labyrinths, Galerie Emmanuel David, Paris, 1974.
- Unusual Escapes, Galerie Emmanuel David, Paris, November–December 1975.
- Imaginary Portraits of Richard Wagner's Heroes, Bayreuth Festival, 1975.
- The Grandes Soirées of the French Comedy, Galerie Proscenium, Paris, 1980.
- Osram Gallery, Munich, 1982.
- The Barocco Opera House, Galerie Proscenium, Paris, 1982.
- Clayette - Engravings, Denon Museum, Châlon-sur-Saône, December 1983 - January 1984.
- Venetian phantasms, Galerie Proscenium, Paris, 1984.
- The Great Replicas of Victor Hugo's theater, Galerie Proscenium, Paris, 1985.
- The Magic of Rimbaud, Galerie Proscenium, Paris, 1986.
- In Complete Freedom, Galerie Proscenium, Paris, 1987.
- Predilections, Galerie Proscenium, Paris, 1988.
- Paris, Phantasm, Galerie Proscenium, Paris, 1989.
- Mozart in the Present, Galerie Proscenium, Paris, 1991.
- The Caravels of Christopher Columbus, Galerie Proscenium, Paris, 1992 (then traveling exhibition in Genoa and Seville as part of the commemorations of the 500th anniversary of the epic of Christopher Columbus).
- Kahn Dumousset, auctioneers in Paris, Sale of Pierre Clayette studio, Hôtel Drouot, July 3, 2008 4.

=== Collective exhibitions ===
- Art and Medicine Seen by Twenty-four Painters - including Yves Brayer, Jean Carzou, Pierre Clayette and Jean Jansem at the Galerie Roger Dulac, October–November 1963.
- From Bonnard to Baselitz, ten years of enrichments of the cabinet of prints, National Library of France, 1992.

== Works ==
=== Scenography (Sets and Costumes) ===
By his own admission, Pierre Clayette was interested in scenography and theater design before even considering painting. The influence of Cassandre is evident in an artist who was one of the last representatives of the period between the 1920s and the late 1970s during which theater and opera directors often appeal to leading artists in the world of painting. As such, Clayette is part of a lineage that included, among others, André Derain, Balthus, Christian Berard, George Wakhevich, Cassandre and André Masson. Clayette entered the world of scenography in 1955 for a ballet by Daniel Wayenberg with Pierre Lacotte who entrusted him with his first set of sets. Clayette became famous among the great names of lyric and dramatic scenes, such as Maurice Béjart, Pierre Lacotte, Gabriel Dussurget, Maurice Escande and Jean Le Poulain, maintaining a long involvement with the latter until Poulain's death in 1988. Clayette's talent as a stage designer gave him the opportunity to express himself on the most prestigious stages, such as the Comédie-Française, the Palais Garnier and the International Festival of Lyric Art in Aix-en-Provence.

== Scenographic creations ==
- 1955 - Solstice - Chor. Pierre Lacotte - Théâtre des Champs-Élysées (Ballet)
- 1958 - Juliet - Chor. Maurice Béjart - Ballet - Théâtre de Paris (Ballet)
- 1958 - The Hunchback - Mesc. Jacques Dacqmine - Apollo Theatre (Theater)
- 1962 - The Contessa - Mesc. Jean Le Poulain - Théâtre de Paris (Theatre)
- 1962 - The Great Catherine - Mesc. Jean Le Poulain - Comédie-Française
- 1963 - A Caprice - Mesc. Maurice Escande - Comédie-Française
- 1963 - Ariadne auf Naxos by Richard Strauss - Chor. Werner Duggelin - Aix-en-Provence Festival (Ballet)
- 1964 - Zoroaster by Jean-Philippe Rameau - Chor. Michel Rayne - Opéra-Comique (Ballet)
- 1965 - The Nutcracker - Chor. Michel Rayne - Opéra-Comique (Ballet)
- 1965 - The Caleche - Mesc. Jean-Pierre Grenier - Théâtre de la Ville (Theatre)
- 1965 - Bifurcation - Chor. Pierre Lacotte - Ballets JMF (Ballet)
- 1965 - The Voice - Chor. Pierre Lacotte - Ballets JMF (Ballet)
- 1966 - Coppelia - Chor. Michel Descombey - Palais Garnier (Ballet)
- 1966 - The Locomotive - Mesc. André Roussin - Théâtre Marigny (Theatre)
- 1968 - The Marriage of Figaro - Chor. Jean-Laurent Cochet - Aix-en-Provence Festival (Ballet)
- 1969 - The Italians in Paris - Mesc. Jean Le Poulain - Comédie-Français
- 1972 - The black suits you so well by Saul O'Hara (French adaptation of Jean Marsan ) - Mesc. Jean Le Poulain - Théâtre Antoine-Simone Berriau (Theatre)
- 1973 - The Debauchery - Mesc. Jean Le Poulain - Theater of the Work (Theatre)
- 1973 - The Queen of Caesarea - Mesc. Jean-Laurent Cochet - Modern Theater (Theater)
- 1976 - Amphitryon 38 by Jean Giraudoux - Mesc. Jean-Laurent Cochet - Théâtre Édouard VII (Theatre)
- 1977 - Pygmalion - Mesc. Raymond Gérome - Théâtre de Paris (Theater)

== French television ==
The Treasure of the Dutch - sets by André François and Pierre Clayette (1969)

== Book illustrations ==
Clayette's cover design for Julius Caesar for New Penguin Shakespeare (1967)

- Pierre Cuvillier, Cold China, illustrations by Pierre Clayette, Presses littéraires de France, 1949.
- William Shakespeare, Macbeth, sixteen original lithographs by Pierre Clayette, 30 numbered copies, The Hundred One, Women's Bibliophile Society, 1965.
- Johann Wolfgang von Goethe (translation and preface by Paul Arnold), Faust, illustrations by Pierre Clayette, ODEJ Presse, 1966.
- Yves Masselot, Requiem Babel - Poems, illustrations by Pierre Clayette, Editions Formmes et langages, Uzès, 1971.
- Roger Caillois, Dreams of Stones, inset illustrations by Pierre Clayette, Editions of the Caisse des Depots et Consignations, 1984.
- Arthur Rimbaud (presentation by Cecil Arthur Hackett), Poetic Works, illustrations by Pierre Clayette, Editions d'art of the Imprimerie Nationale, 1986.
- Jean Le Poulain, Paris Phantasies, illustrations by Pierre Clayette, Grappedis Publishing, 1989.

== Public collections ==
=== France ===
- Mills, National Center of Stage Costume National Center for Art and Culture, Centre Georges Pompidou, Paris.
- Cabinet of prints of the National Library of France, Paris, Calm Morning Galley, etching and aquatint in colors, published by Lacourière-Frélaut, 1979
- Library - Museum of the Comédie-Française, Paris.
- Musée d'Art Moderne de la Ville de Paris, 'Calm Morning Galleon' and 'Amber Nave', prints
- National Fund of Contemporary Art, Paris, including depot: Military School of Administration, Montpellier.
- Centre National du Costume de Scene, Moulins, Allier
- Musée de Gajac, Villeneuve-sur-Lot, transcendent space, engraving

=== Italy ===
- International Museum of Applied Arts of Today (MIAAO), Turin
