= Monsieur Ibrahim =

- Film poster
- Directed by: François Dupeyron
- Written by: Éric-Emmanuel Schmitt; François Dupeyron
- Based on: Monsieur Ibrahim et les fleurs du Coran by Éric-Emmanuel Schmitt
- Produced by: Laurent Pétin; Michèle Pétin
- Starring: Omar Sharif; Pierre Boulanger; Gilbert Melki; Isabelle Renauld; Lola Naymark; Isabelle Adjani
- Cinematography: Rémy Chevrin
- Edited by: Dominique Faysse
- Distributed by: ARP Sélection
- Release date: 17 September 2003
- Running time: 95 minutes
- Country: France
- Language: French
- Budget: €5.3 million
- Box office: $12.364 million

Monsieur Ibrahim (original title: Monsieur Ibrahim et les fleurs du Coran; French pronunciation: [məsjø ibʁaim e le flœʁ dy kɔʁɑ̃], Mister Ibrahim and the Flowers of the Qur'an) is a 2003 French drama film starring Omar Sharif, and directed by François Dupeyron. The film is based on a book by Éric-Emmanuel Schmitt.

== Plot ==
The story unfolds in a working-class neighborhood in the Paris of the 1960s. The protagonist, Moїse Schmidt (Momo), is a young Jewish boy growing up without a mother and with a father afflicted by crippling depression. Momo is fascinated by the elderly Turkish Muslim man, Ibrahim Demirci, who runs a grocery store across the street from his apartment (where Momo often shoplifts). Their relationship develops and soon Momo feels closer to Ibrahim than to his father. Ibrahim affectionately calls Moїse Momo, and adopts him when his father leaves and commits suicide. Momo and Ibrahim go on a journey in their new car to Turkey, Ibrahim's native country, where Momo learns about Ibrahim's culture. At the end of their adventure, Ibrahim is killed in a car crash and Momo returns to Paris to take over the shop.

== Cast ==
- Omar Sharif as Monsieur Ibrahim
- Pierre Boulanger as Momo
- Gilbert Melki as Momo's father
- Isabelle Renauld as Momo's mother
- Lola Naymark as Myriam
- Anne Suarez as Sylvie
- Mata Gabin as Fatou
- Celine Samie as Eva
- Isabelle Adjani as The Movie Star

== Awards and nominations ==
- César Award, Best Actor 2004: Omar Sharif
- Chicago International Film Festival, Silver Hugo for Best Male Performance 2003: Pierre Boulanger
- Venice International Film Festival, Audience Award, Best Actor 2003: Omar Sharif

Also nominated for several awards, including the 2004 Golden Globe for Best Foreign Language Film.

== See also ==
- Sufism
