= When I Was a Work of Art =

When I Was a Work of Art (Lorsque j'étais une oeuvre d'art) is a novel by Éric-Emmanuel Schmitt, a Belgian dramatist and writer. The novel tells the story of a young man who gives up his humanity to an artist, who transforms the young man into a work of art. The novel was published in 2002 (originally in French) and was Schmitt's fourth novel. The novel is based on Faust by Goethe.

== Plot ==
Tazio Firelli, a young man about to commit suicide, is approached by Zeus-Peter Lama, an eccentric well-known artist who offers to give him a reason to live. Lama then convinces Tazio to give up his humanity and become a living sculpture named Adam Bis, which Lama claims is the first of its kind. While living as a work of art, Tazio becomes depressed, believing that he has lost both his humanity and freedom. He eventually meets Carlos Hannibal, a blind painter, and his daughter Fiona. The relationship between the three gives Tazio the will to live again. Fiona then organises a lawsuit to help Tazio regain his freedom. The lawsuit culminates when Lama announces that Tazio is a fake of the original Adam Bis and is hence worthless. Once free, Tazio marries Fiona.

== Characters ==
- The narrator: Tazio Adam Firelli, 20 years old, suicidal and non-existent, who becomes the living sculpture "Adam bis".
- Zeus-Peter Lama: A famous contemporary artist.
- Dr. Fichet: Forensic doctor forced to work for Lama because of his gambling debts.
- Carlos Hannibal: Great painter of the invisible, lives near Lama's residence.
- Fiona Hannibal: Daughter of the painter Carlos Hannibal, future wife of Adam.
- Enzo and Rienzi Firelli: Brothers of Tazio, considered the most beautiful men in the world.
- Zoltan: Driver of Zeus-Peter Lama.
- Titus: Servant of Zeus-Peter Lama.

== Reception ==
The novel was generally well-received, with a review in the Figaro calling it an "original love story" with "excellent social commentary."
