= La part de l'autre =

2001 novel by Éric-Emmanuel Schmitt

La Part de l'autre ("The Part of The Other", also called "The Alternative Hypothesis") is a 2001 alternate history novel by Éric-Emmanuel Schmitt, the plot serving to illustrate the writer's ideas of Moral Philosophy. It consists of a fictionalized biography of Adolf Hitler, sticking to the known facts of Hitler's life, in parallel with the fictional alternative biography the world-famous painter known as "Adolf H." - the person which Hitler could have become.

According to Schmitt, "The minute which changed the course of world history" is the moment when a member of the jury of the Vienna Academy of Fine Arts uttered the words "Adolf Hitler: Failed". The historical character, angry and bitter at being rejected by the academy, feeling that he deserved to be accepted and that he must have been the victim of some kind of conspiracy, begins to descend the path that would eventually lead him to be the rabble-rousing leader of the Nazi Party and the dictator of Nazi Germany.

Conversely, in the alternative reality where the jury member said "Adolf Hitler: Accepted", the young Hitler is deliriously happy to enter the academy, where he discovers a world of feelings that his less fortunate double would never know - eventually leading to his becoming the highly successful painter Adolf H.

== Plot summary ==
October 8, 1908 - "Adolf Hitler: failed". "What would have happened if the Vienna Academy of Fine Arts had decided otherwise? What would have happened if, on that minute, the jury had accepted and not rejected Adolf Hitler, if it would have fulfilled his artistic ambitions? That minute would have changed the course of a life, that of the young, shy and passionate Adolf Hitler, but it would also have changed the course of the whole world..."

The book includes two parallel scenarios:

First, Adolf Hitler's life is described, from October 8, 1908, until his death on April 30, 1945, and also including the consequences and further ramifications of his dictatorship - such as the Cold War, the Partition of Germany and the founding of Israel.

The fictional plot shows us the completely opposite life course of Adolf H. Hitler, who in this life would come to be always called "Adolf H.", was admitted to the Academy of Fine Arts in Vienna on October 8, 1908, and embarked on an intensive course of study. However, he fainted during a drawing class with nude models. Desperately he consults Eduard Bloch, his family doctor, who refers him to a certain Sigmund Freud.

Freud diagnoses his patient with an Oedipus complex. As it comes out, Adolf H.'s mother had been beaten by his father on several occasions. After the death of his father, followed by that of his mother, H. felt a double sense of guilt. After several sessions, Freud succeeded in curing his patient. Various love affairs in the Viennese nightlife allow Adolf H. to completely overcome his sexual inhibitions. (It is noteworthy that Freud is the main character of a play by Schmitt, "The Visitor".)

When war broke out in 1914, Adolf H. was drafted and sent to the French front - but unlike the historical Hitler, for whom the military experience offered a relief from a frustrating life, for Adolf H. being sent to war was a very unwelcome interruption of the promising beginning of his artistic career. Witnessing the horrors of WWI trench warfare made Adolf H. a lifelong pacifist.

When the war was over, Adolf H. moved to Paris to reconnect with his life as an artist. He joined the group surrounding André Breton, turned to surrealism and became a prominent painter within this artistic movement. He also began a passionate relationship with a French woman, but when she died of illness, Adolf H. abandoned his active artistic career and moved to Berlin where he became an art teacher.

However, in Berlin Adolf H. re-discovered a friend from Paris, Sarah Rubinstein, who has succeeded brilliantly in perfumery. She encouraged him to reconnect with painting. A passionate relationship began between the two, culminating in a marriage and the birth of twins.

During the 1940s and 1950s, Adolf H. became a world-famous artist. His son Rembrandt, who had become a famous physicist, worked in the German space program, his daughter Sophie married an American and entered the world of United States cinema.

After the death of his wife, his star faded in the 1960s. Adolf H. emigrated to California and devoted the rest of his life to lithography, while spending much of his time with his three grandchildren. In 1970, Adolf H. died peacefully, surrounded by his family.

== Influence on wider history in this Alternate timeline ==
Political map of Europe following the Germano-Polish War of 1939; other than the elimination of the Polish Corridor, there were no border changes.

Because there had never been a Hitler dictatorship, world political events unfold quite differently. This is depicted briefly in the background, since the main focus is on the personality of Adolf H. the painter as contrasted with that of Adolf Hitler the dictator.

In this history, Germany of the early 1930s was not taken over by the National Socialist Party. Rather, a conservative government arose, supported by the army and with Ludwig Beck as Reich Chancellor. This regime, authoritarian but not totalitarian, enjoyed a moderate approval among the German people.

Austria and Czechoslovakia were not annexed by Germany, but became its most important economic partners. However, also in this history there was in Germany a resentment of the Treaty of Versailles, leading Germany also in this 1939 to attack Poland. The Poles were defeated after a short war. As Great Britain and France remained neutral, the conflict ended there and did not develop into the Second World War.

Germany in this history did not seek to occupy the whole of Poland, but was content to force Poland to return to Germany the hotly contested territory of the Polish Corridor, created in Versailles. As the majority of Germans considered that their country's honor has been restored, radical Nationalist groups lost ground. Gradually, therefore, the country became once again a democracy, world famous for its successful integration of Jews. Anti-Semitism, of which Joseph Goebbels was one of the best-known proponents, became a "troublesome but marginal phenomenon" in Germany. In this history, of course, Adolf H. and Goebbels never had anything to do with each other.

The development of Germany made it economically the most powerful country in the world, while Berlin became a multicultural metropolis. In addition, it was the Germans who sent the first artificial satellite into space and in 1970 effected the first Moon landing.

The Holocaust and the founding of Israel never happened. Though Zionism had many supporters, without a genocide of the Jews and the guilt felt about it, the International Community did not endorse the project of creating a Jewish State. Rather, the pressure of the Arab population forced the British to stop the immigration of Jews to Palestine, and Zionism went to "the cemetery of failed utopias".

Without being credited with the monumental heroic struggle of defeating the Nazi invasion of the Soviet Union, and without a Soviet hegemony over half of Europe, the Soviet Communist regime was much weaker than in our history and already in the early 1960s was overthrown by a popular uprising.

As WWII did not happen, the United States did not achieve a global superpower status, and was considered a rather old-fashioned country.

== Analysis ==
By evoking the sensitivity of Adolf Hitler, Éric-Emmanuel Schmitt shows that the world could have been quite different and that each of us contains a potential Hitler, a possibility of doing evil. This part that most men constantly hide, repress, is considered here as a prelude to war, to death.

The author, in approaching this reflection, tries to understand, without justifying, so that we shall not see such a tragedy on our planet again. In the book, we find the expression “"The One Part or The Other"” in a letter that Adolf H. wrote to Sister Lucia: “I admit the part of the other in the constitution of my destiny” (p. 247); thus, this letter alludes to the opinion of others which allows Adolf H., as Freud had done before, to realize his qualities and his faults, and thanks to this, to progress and gradually move away from the part of himself that would have led him to become the Hitler of our history.

The style of writing, sharply alternating the story of the life of the two characters, Hitler (historical) and Adolf H. (imagined by the author), heightens the unease which becomes more palpable at every moment: the dictator Hitler is a possible evolution existing in every human being. This is one of the author's messages: nothing is ever predestined, each person decides at each moment the orientation of his or her life. This thesis approaches the Existentialism of Jean-Paul Sartre, who also considers that humans perpetually reinvent themselves.

== Publication history ==
Original Print Edition

- Éditions Albin Michel, 2001, ISBN 2-226-12660-0.

Print Edition After Journal

- Éditions Albin Michel, 2005, ISBN 2-226-15848-0.

Pocket Edition

- Hachette Livre, Le Livre de Poche, 2003, ISBN 2-253-15537-3.

== Translations ==
The novel has been translated into German, Romanian, Korean, Greek, Italian, Dutch, Norwegian, Polish, Portuguese, Russian, Serbian, Swedish and Vietnamese - but as of 2024, not yet to English.
