= Théâtre Rive Gauche =

Theatre in Paris, France

Coordinates: 48.8408°N 2.3243°E

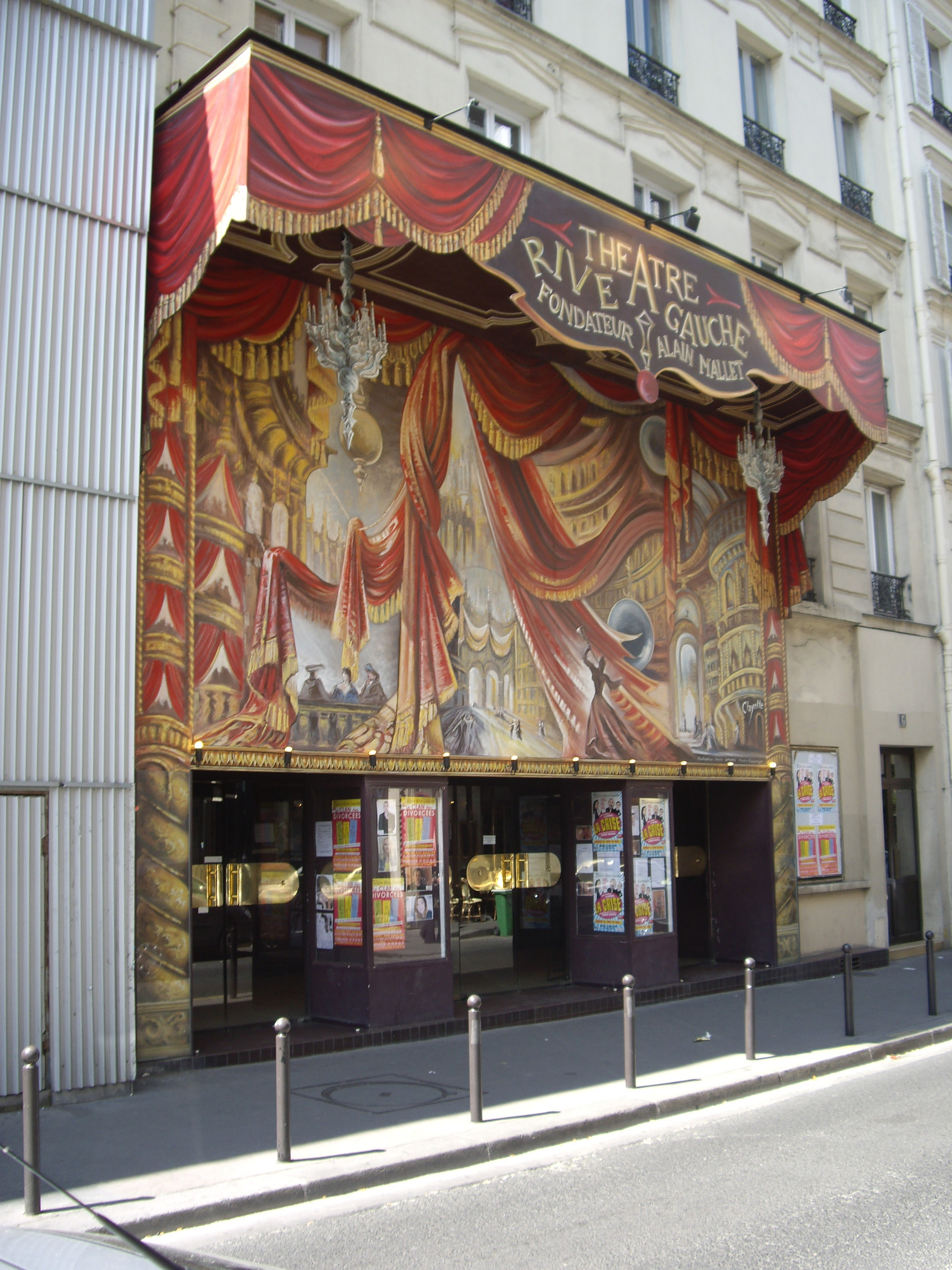
Façade of the Théâtre Rive Gauche in Paris decorated by Pierre Clayette in 1994

The Théâtre Rive Gauche (French pronunciation: [teɑtʁ ʁiv ɡoʃ]) is a theatre in Paris in France located at 6, rue de la Gaîté in the 14th arrondissement of Paris. It is owned by the Edgar Entertainment Society, which also owns the Edgar Café and the Edgar Theatre located at 58 Edgar-Quinet Boulevard in the same borough. The auditorium has 400 seats and hosts contemporary productions.

== History ==
A former cabaret club later transformed into a cinema, it became the Théâtre Rive Gauche (or Left Bank Theatre) in 1994, replacing the large Edgar Theatre created in 1986 by Alain Mallet. The façade created for its reopening in 1994 is by the French painter Pierre Clayette. The deterioration of the original façade necessitated its reconstruction in 2008.

In 2010 50 private theatres in Paris gathered in the Association pour le Soutien du Théâtre Privé (ASTP) and the Syndicat National des Directeurs et Tourneurs du Théâtre Privé (SNDTP), which included the Théâtre Rive Gauche, and decided to launch a new group: the 'Theatres Parisiens Associés'.

In January 2012 Éric-Emmanuel Schmitt became the director of the Théâtre Rive Gauche in association with the producer and comedian Bruno Metzger, while in 2013 the actor and director Steve Suissa joined the theatre.

After a production of Anne Frank's Diary other pieces were produced including: M. Ibrahim and the Flowers of the Koran with Francis Lalanne (2018); Right or Wrong by Ronald Harwood; Billie Holiday with Viktor Lazlo in a staging by Éric-Emmanuel Schmitt; and finally The Confrontation by Bill C. Davis and staged by Steve Suissa with Francis Huster and Davy Sardou. The 2013-2014 season opened with two world premieres: Miss Carpenter by Marianne James and Sébastien Marnier; and The Guitrys, a new play by Éric-Emmanuel Schmitt, directed by Steve Suissa and performed by Claire Keim and Martin Lamotte.

The façade was decorated by the artist Pierre Clayette in 1994.

== Awards ==
- Molière Award - 1999 one man show for Je suis un saumon by Philippe Avron
- Molière Award for Best Comedy Show in 2001 for Anthony McCarten and Stephen Sinclair's Ladies Night
- Molière Award for the 2003 adaptation by Pascale de Boysson for Le Regard
- Molière Award in 2010 for Laurent Terzieff in Ronald Harwood's The Dresser, directed by Laurent Terzieff
