= Valentina Radinska =

Bulgarian poet (born 1951)

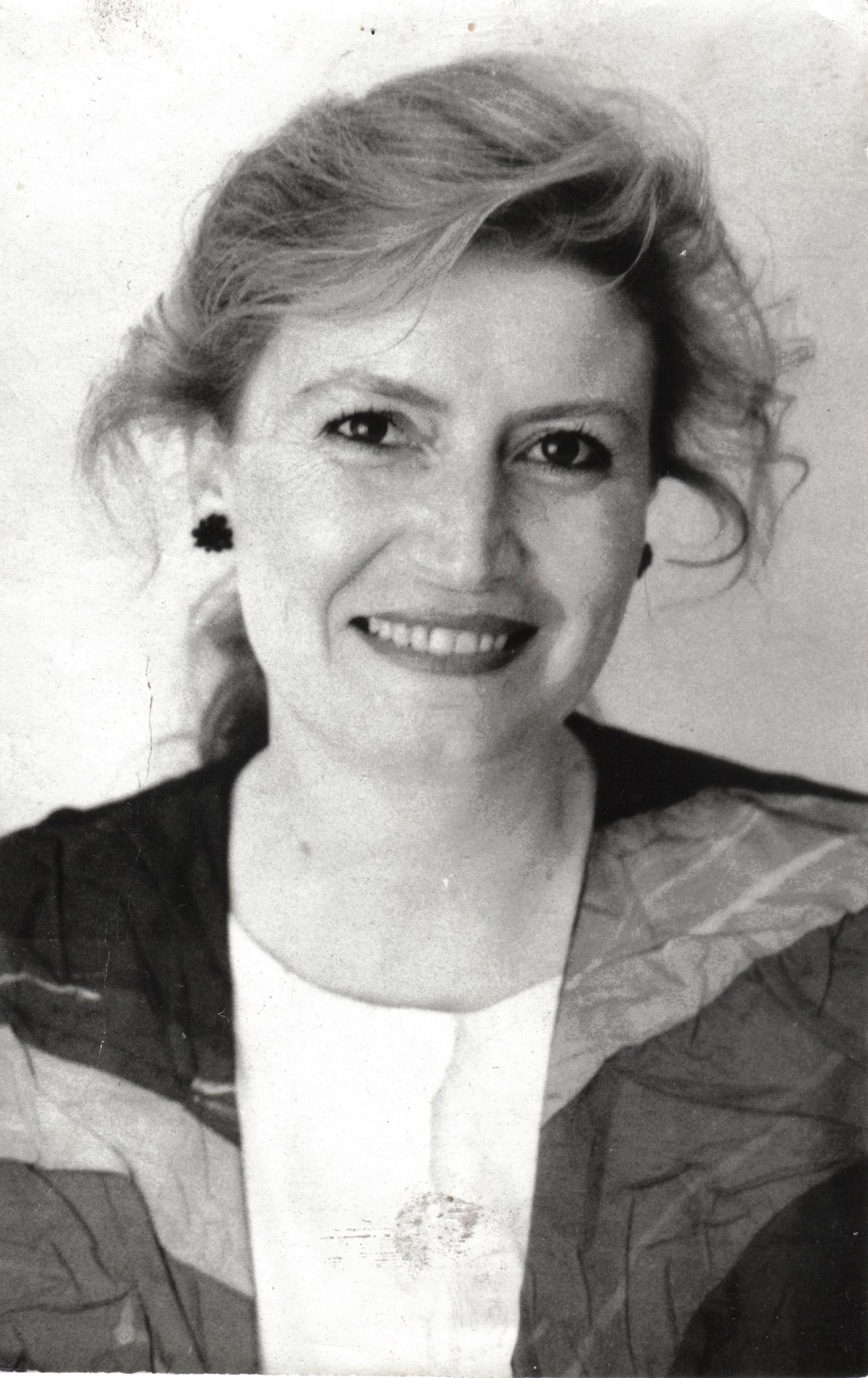
Valentina Dimitrova Radinska

Valentina Dimitrova Radinska (Bulgarian: Валентина Димитрова Радинска) (born 1951 in Slivеn) is a Bulgarian poet.

== Life ==
She studied at the Sofia University, and graduated from the Maxim Gorky Literature Institute with an MA. She was an editor at Bulgarian Cinematography. She teaches at Sofia University.

She was married to theater director Krikor Azaryan.

== Works ==
- "All Soul's Day"
- "Gently"
- Kum men vurvi chovek (A man walks toward me), 1977
- Noshtna Kniga (Night book), 1983
- Ne: Stikhotvoreniia, Kni-vo " Georgi Bakalov", 1988
- Chistilishte (Purgatory), Izdatelska kushta "Niagolova", 1992, ISBN 978-954-8160-04-9
- Vsichko: Stikhotvoreniia (Everything), Izdatelska kushta "Ivan Vazov", 1995, ISBN 978-954-604-022-0
- Dimcho Debelianov i Povelitelia na vultsite, Iadatelska kushta "P.K. IAvorov", 1997, ISBN 978-954-525-053-8

=== Anthologies ===
- Walter M. Cummins, ed. (1993). Shifting borders: East European poetries of the eighties. Fairleigh Dickinson University Press. ISBN 978-0-8386-3497-4.
