= M. Ibrahim and the Flowers of the Koran =

2001 novel by Éric-Emmanuel Schmitt

- Author: Éric-Emmanuel Schmitt
- Original title: Monsieur Ibrahim et les fleurs du Coran
- Language: French
- Publisher: Albin Michel
- Publication date: 13 June 2001
- Pages: 96

M. Ibrahim and the Flowers of the Koran (French: Monsieur Ibrahim et les fleurs du Coran) is a novel by Éric-Emmanuel Schmitt, originally published in French in 2001. A film adaptation, Monsieur Ibrahim, was released in 2003.

== Origins ==
M. Ibrahim and the Flowers of the Koran was originally written in French as a play, based upon the life of Schmitt's friend, Bruno Abraham-Kremer. Kremer had asked Schmitt to write a play based upon his life growing up in Paris, specifically the relationship with his grandfather, Mr. Abraham. The play was written with only one character, Moïse (Moses), referred to as "Momo" an adult, who reflected upon his childhood. In 2001, it was rewritten, and was printed as a short novel by publisher Albin Michel, the second in the religious series "Cycle de l'Invisible" (Cycle of the Invisible).

In some respects, the book closely resembles the novel "La Vie devant soi" (Life in front of you) by Romain Gary under the pseudonym Emile Ajar. In that book, a young Muslim boy, also called Momo (here a nickname for Muhammad), lives with an old Jewish woman, Madame Rosa. Momo often goes to visit an old Muslim man, Monsieur Hamil, who teaches him about the religion, subsequently entering into a grandfather-grandson relationship, quite similar to that of Momo and M. Ibrahim in Schmitt's novel.

== Plot summary ==
The book begins in the 1960s with a young Moïse, nicknamed Momo, preparing to search for a prostitute. It is written as a reflection of his childhood, and he notes that he was only eleven years old at the time, but his height and his weight made him look older. He breaks his piggy bank open, takes his money, and heads outside to the Rue de Paradis (lit. 'Paradise Street' or 'Heaven Street'), to find a prostitute. The first part of the book is set in the Faubourg Poissonnière, a district of Paris, which is described in detail. Momo always stops by the shop of the Turkish grocer, M. Ibrahim, and often shoplifts. After his stop in this small shop, he sets out to find a prostitute, but is turned down several times for lack of identification. Finally, he finds one who will offer her services, and they head off together. Momo forgets to bring a gift for the girl, and runs home to get his teddy bear, a final link to his childhood.

As the book progresses, Momo speaks to M. Ibrahim more and more. M. Ibrahim shows Momo how to save the precious little money his father gives him, by buying day-old bread and reheating it, filling bottles of Bordeaux with a cheaper variety, buying cheaper ingredients, etc. and also teaches him the art of smiling, which subsequently gets him out of trouble quite often. Momo's father hardly notices a difference in these new ingredients.

Momo becomes closer to M. Ibrahim, who eventually takes him to see the "real" Paris, where the famous landmarks are. Shockingly, one day, his father, a struggling lawyer, decides to run off, leaving about one month's worth of money for Momo. He also left a note with a list of people whom Momo should contact. After this incident, Momo becomes even closer to M. Ibrahim, who takes him on a vacation in Normandy, which Momo believes is too beautiful, bringing him to tears. Three months after Momo's stay in Normandy, the police arrive at his door to tell him that his father has committed suicide by throwing himself in front of a train in Marseille, and Momo is forced to return to Paris in order to identify his father's body. Afterwards, Momo goes back to his apartment with M. Ibrahim and repaints the walls. During this time, Momo's mother enters, inquiring about her son Moïse. When asked, Moïse states that his name is Momo, saying that it is short for Mohammed. When she is not convinced, Momo attempts to lie further, saying that Moïse had left in search of his older brother, Popol, although his mother states that Moïse is her only child. She asks for Momo to relay a message to Moïse if he ever sees him again, stating that she had met his father when she was young and married him in order to leave her house, despite never liking him. She continues by saying she was ready to love Moïse, although she had ended up leaving him with his father in order to pursue a happier life with another man. She asks for him to relay the message to Moïse if he ever sees him, and leaves. Later that night, Momo jokingly asks M. Ibrahim if he will adopt Momo, and M. Ibrahim agrees. Afterward Momo becomes his legally adopted son, and M. Ibrahim buys a car in celebration, stating that they will travel to many places in this car. After buying one, Momo discovers that M. Ibrahim does not remember how to drive, and that the license he showed the car's salesman was actually a letter from a friend, which was written in Egyptian. They take driving lessons together, and Momo sits in the back seat, paying attention to every instruction. Afterwards, the two travel to many countries, beginning with Europe and driving to the Middle East, with Momo driving the car for the entirety of their travels. M. Ibrahim describes the land to Momo as he drives, and reveals more about his culture. In Turkey, the place where M. Ibrahim was born, Ibrahim asks Momo to wait for him by an olive tree as he goes to meet his friend Abdullah. During this time, Momo falls asleep under the tree, and when he wakes up he discovers that the entire day has passed. Momo walks to a nearby village where people approach him in a panic, ushering him to a big house where he finds M. Ibrahim, bloodied and next to the car, which is crashed into the wall. Soon after, M. Ibrahim dies. Momo hitchhikes back to Paris, where he has found that M. Ibrahim has left him his Coran and his store. From time to time, his mother will visit and asks about Moïse, and Momo tells her that Moïse had found his brother and they were taking a trip together, and probably wouldn't return for a long time. Afterwards, his mother invites him to dinner with her husband.

Momo is now happily married to a woman, and has two kids that affectionately call his mother "grandmother." At times, his mother will ask if it does not bother him, suggesting that she never finds out Momo's real identity. Momo continues to run the store, which is open nights and Sundays.

== Analysis ==
Through this book, Schmitt wanted to show the history of a young Jewish boy and the Muslim grocer of their neighbourhood in Paris, but without obviously making religion essential to the plot. The principal plot aspect is Momo starting to break free of the prison of an increasingly absent father, a mother who left at birth, and constant inferiority to an older brother who is never seen, but to whom his father always compares him.

Nonetheless, there is a religious aspect:

- The two protagonists have religious names, the Patriarch Abraham, which is "Ibrahim" in Arabic, and Moïse (Moses). This shows the connection between these two religions.
- The second major religious aspect is reflected in M. Ibrahim's knowledge of the Koran; throughout the film, he affirms "Je sais ce qu'il y a dans mon Coran" (I know what is in my Koran), which in the then (2001) social context of France could have expressed the downturn occurring in the religion. However, the character of M. Ibrahim is shown to be quite open minded, in the neighbourhood via his grocery store, in his choice of less common things in his private life, including vacations in Normandy, and the purchase of a car, and to the world, shown in his adoption of Momo and his trip through the multi-confessional Balkans to arrive in his native Turkey. Despite the final exclamation of "what there is in [his] Koran", the character clearly has a religious belief that brings peace to himself, regardless of the conflict in the world, a peace which he passed on to Momo, Sufism.

== Adaptations ==
In 2003, the book was adapted for film by François Dupeyron. Omar Sharif was awarded the César Award for Best Actor in 2004 for his portrayal of M. Ibrahim. See: Monsieur Ibrahim et les Fleurs du Coran.

In 2004, the book was published in an edition for schooling, at the 3rd Level of Collège and also in the Professional Lycée. In Germany, it has been published with vocabulary annotations, making it a candidate book for French education, in the French as a second language courses.

The play was performed at the Théâtre Rive Gauche in Paris in September to October 2018.

It has been revived as a monologue multiple times in Lisbon at Teatro Meridional since 2012, each time directed and performed by Miguel Seabra.
