= Krikor Azaryan =

Krikor Stepan Azaryan (Bulgarian: Крикор Степан Азарян; 15 March 1934 – 14 December 2009) was a Bulgarian director.

== Life and career ==
A Bulgarian Armenian, Azaryan was born in Plovdiv. He graduated from what is today the Krastyo Sarafov National Academy for Theatre and Film Arts in Sofia in 1966 and was a post-graduate student in Moscow and Saint Petersburg (then Leningrad) in the Soviet Union. He spent most of his career as a theatre director at the Theatre of the Bulgarian Army, though he has also worked for the Plovdiv Theatre, the National Theatre, the Satire Theatre and Theatre Sofia, as well as theatres in Moscow and Bitola. He has directed plays by Anton Chekhov, William Shakespeare, Nikolai Gogol, Nikolay Haytov, etc.

After spending 30 years as a professor of acting at the National Academy for Theatre and Film Arts, Azaryan left the academy to join New Bulgarian University's theatre department in 2005. Azaryan was married to poet Valentina Radinska.

== Awards ==
He won the Askeer theatre prize.
