= Ronald Donev =

Bulgarian footballer

Personal information
- Full name: Ronald Donchev Donev
- Date of birth: 13 May 1991 (age 35)
- Place of birth: Bulgaria
- Height: 1.88 m (6 ft 2 in)
- Positions: Defender; midfielder

Youth career
- –2010: Levski Sofia

Senior career*
Years	Team	Apps	(Gls)
2010	Botev Plovdiv	1	(0)
2011–2012	Lokomotiv Sofia	0	(0)
2013	Svetkavitsa	2	(0)
2013–2015	Spartak Varna	18	(0)
2015–2016	Septemvri Sofia	10	(1)
2016–2017	Tsarsko Selo	16	(1)
- * Club domestic league appearances and goals as of 30 May 2017

Ronald Donev (Bulgarian: Роналд Донев; born 13 May 1991) is a Bulgarian footballer who last played for Tsarsko Selo as a defender. He is the son of former Bulgarian international forward Doncho Donev.
