= Éric-Emmanuel Schmitt =

Franco-Belgian playwright

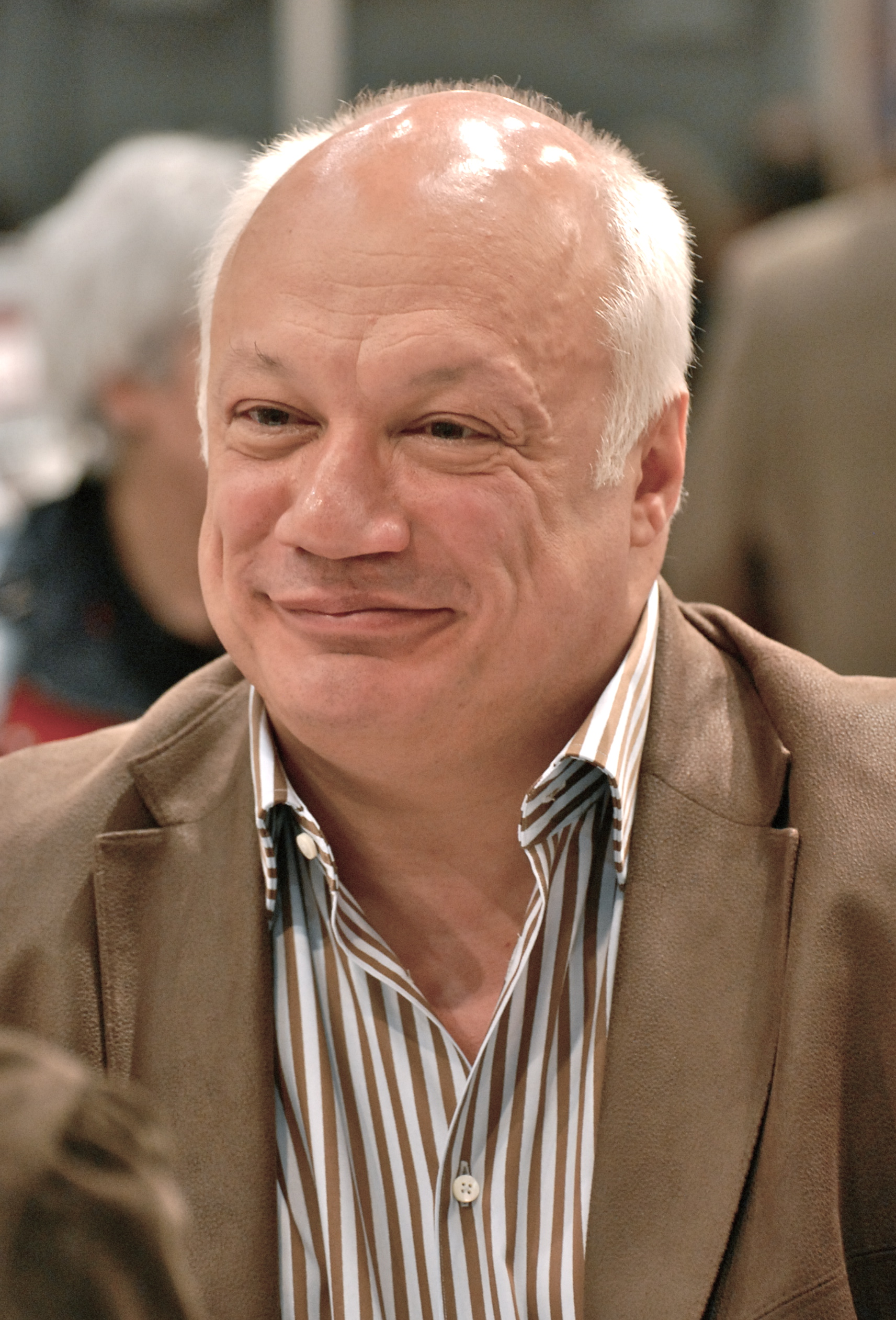
- Born: 28 March 1960 (age 66); Sainte-Foy-lès-Lyon, Rhône
- Awards: Grand prix des lectrices de Elle

Academic background
- Education: Ecole Normale Supérieure, Paris IV
- Thesis: Diderot et la métaphysique (1987)
- Doctoral advisor: Nicolas Grimaldi

Academic work
- Notable works: Oscar and the Lady in Pink; M. Ibrahim and the Flowers of the Koran
- Website: www.eric-emmanuel-schmitt.net

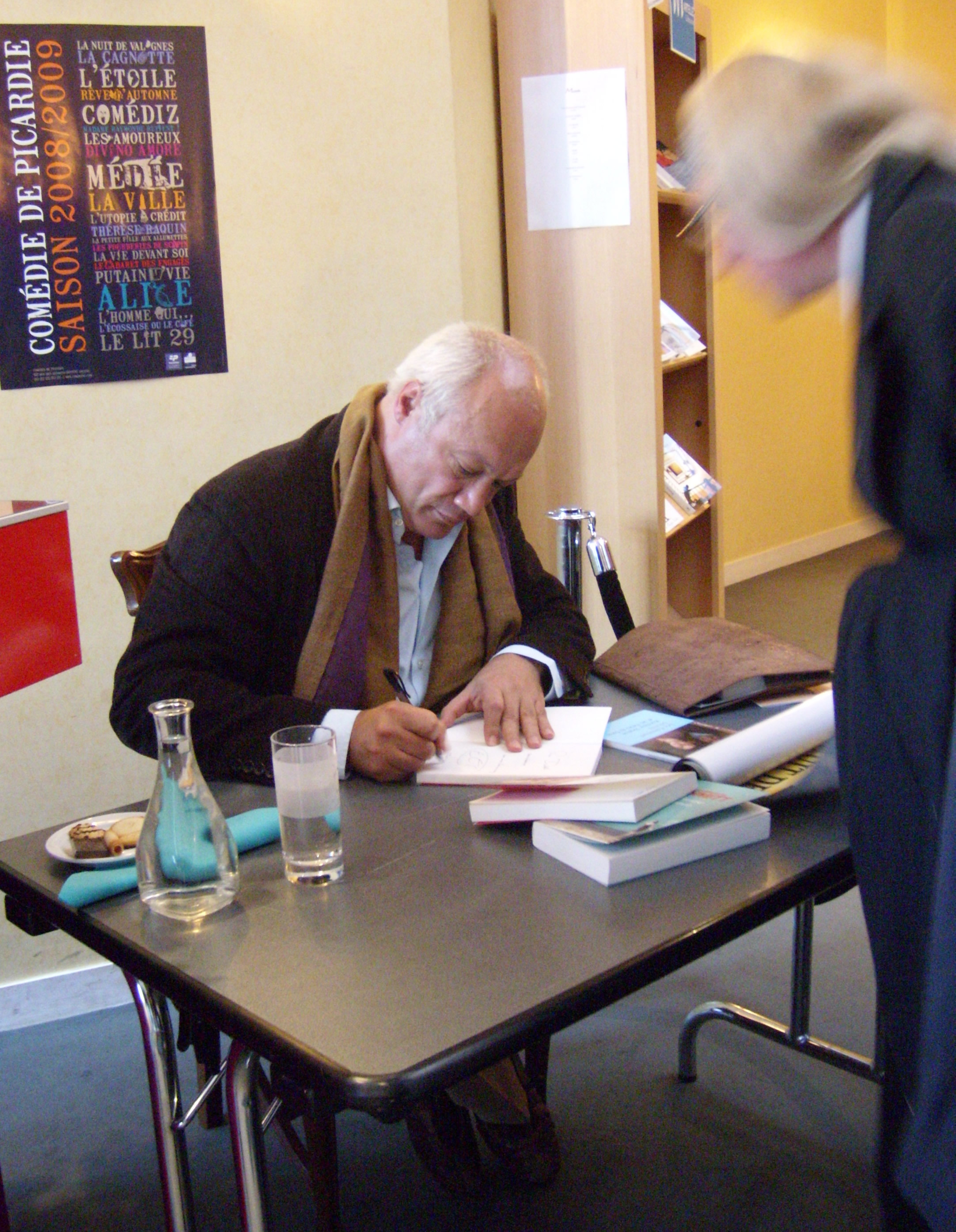

Eric-Emmanuel Schmitt (French pronunciation: [eʁik emanɥɛl ʃmit]; born 28 March 1960) is a Franco-Belgian playwright, short story writer and novelist, as well as a film director. His plays have been staged in over fifty countries all over the world.

== Life ==
=== Early years ===
Eric-Emmanuel Schmitt's parents were teachers of physical education and sport, and his father later became a physiotherapist and masseur in paediatric hospitals. He was also a French boxing champion while his mother was a medal-winning runner. His grandfather was an artisan jeweller.

The "Classiques & Contemporains" edition of La Nuit de Valognes (Don Juan on Trial) claims that Schmitt depicts himself as a rebellious teenager who detested received wisdom and was sometimes prone to violent outbursts. According to Schmitt, however, it was philosophy that saved him and taught him to be himself and to feel that he was free. One day, his mother took him to the Théâtre des Célestins to see a performance of Edmond Rostand's Cyrano de Bergerac starring Jean Marais. Her son was moved to tears and the seeds of his passion for the theatre were sown. After the show, he told his mother that he wanted to "be like the man on the poster"; his mother thought he meant the actor, Jean Marais, but he replied: "No!" and read out the name on the poster "Edmond Rostand". He then began to write. Later, he would say: "At sixteen, I realised (or decided) that I was a writer, and I wrote, produced and acted in my first plays at high school." To improve his style, he threw himself with frenzied zeal into exercises of pastiche and re-writing, especially Molière.

=== Education ===
After preparatory classes at the Lycée du Parc for France's elite universities, Schmitt passed the entrance exam to the École normale supérieure. He was a student there between 1980 and 1985, leaving with the top French teaching qualification in philosophy (agrégé de philosophie). In 1987, he was awarded the degree of PhD for his thesis "Diderot and Metaphysics" at the Paris-Sorbonne University under the direction of Nicolas Grimaldi, which was published in 1997 with the title "Diderot or the Philosophy of Seduction".

He has lived in Brussels since 2002 and obtained Belgian citizenship in 2008.

=== Career ===
Schmitt spent his military service teaching at the Saint-Cyr Military Academy, afterwards spending two years as a student teaching assistant at the University of Besançon. He went on to teach at the high school in Cherbourg before being appointed lecturer at the University of Chambéry, where he taught for four years.

On the night of 4 February 1989, he became separated from his companions during an expedition to the Ahaggar Desert and, in the vast expanses of the Sahara, he underwent a spiritual experience that he characterized as nothing short of a divine revelation. In that instant, he says that his mind was filled with the words "Everything is justified". Schmitt believes that it was that extraordinary experience that enabled him to break into writing. He describes it in his novel Night of Fire (La Nuit de Feu), published in September 2015.

During the 1990s, his plays brought him rapid success in several countries. Don Juan on Trial was the first to be performed in September 1991 at Espace 44 in Nantes. His next play, The Visitor, won three prizes at the Molière Award Ceremony in 1994. It was then that he decided to devote himself entirely to writing, and he gave up his lecturing position at the University of Chambéry.

In 1996, Enigma Variations received its first performance, starring Alain Delon and Francis Huster in the lead roles. In 1998, his play, Frédérick or Crime Boulevard (Frédérick ou le boulevard du crime), opened simultaneously in France and Germany, with Jean-Paul Belmondo acting in the original production at the Théâtre Marigny. In 2001, Mr Ibrahim and the Flowers of the Koran (M. Ibrahim et les Fleurs du Coran) was both staged and published in France and Germany. In 2004, the book sold over 250,000 copies in France and 300,000 in Germany.

Schmitt has also written three one-act plays for humanitarian causes. Francis Huster played the devil in The Devil's School (L'École du diable), which Schmitt wrote for an Amnesty International evening. One Thousand and One Nights was written for the "Culture Changes Life" campaign (La culture ça change la vie) organised by the French charity The People's Aid (Secours populaire).

In the early 2000s, he wrote several novels and short stories. Published in 2000, The Gospel According to Pilate, a novel about Jesus Christ told from the point of view of Pilate, won critical acclaim and massive sales. The next year, he produced another novel about a contentious historical figure: The Alternative Hypothesis (La Part de l'autre) is an alternate history in which the young Adolf Hitler is in 1908 accepted into the Academy of Fine Art in Vienna, setting him on the path to become a recognized painter; what follows changes the course of history for the entire world. He then wrote a whimsical and satirical version of the Faust myth, When I was a Work of Art (Lorsque j'étais une oeuvre d'art – 2002).

The tales that comprise his Cycle de l'Invisible have delighted readers and audiences in the French-speaking world and beyond, both on stage and in the bookshops. Milarepa deals with Buddhism, Mr Ibrahim and the Flowers of the Koran deals with Sufism, Oscar and the Lady in Pink (Oscar et la Dame rose – 2002) with Christianity, Noah's Child (L'Enfant de Noé – 2004) with Judaism, The Sumo wrestler Who Could Not Get Fat (Le Sumo qui ne pouvait pas grossir – 2009) with Zen Buddhism, and The Ten Children Madam Ming Never Had (Les Dix Enfants que madame Ming n'a jamais eus – 2012) deals with Confucianism. They are read by millions of readers of all generations, while critics have not lavished indiscriminate praise on them; thus Andreas Dorschel has argued that in Milarepa, Schmitt turns Buddhism into an instant soup for easy consumption.

Keen to explore new modes of expression, Schmitt wrote a work of autofiction, My Life with Mozart (Ma Vie avec Mozart), which was published in eight different countries from South Korea to Norway. This composition of music and words can also be performed by actors and instrumentalists. In the same vein as the first film he wrote and directed, Schmitt published a collection of short stories, Odette Toulemonde and other stories, a celebration of women and their quest for happiness. Odette Toulemonde has toured Europe as both a book and a film. The Dreamer of Ostend (La Rêveuse d'Ostende), a lyrical tribute to the power of the imagination, followed in 2007, while a third collection appeared in 2010: Concerto to the Memory of an Angel (Concerto à la mémoire d'un ange), four stories that deal with the theme of redemption and which won the "Prix Goncourt de la Nouvelle". A fourth collection, Two Gentlemen of Brussels (Les Deux Messieurs de Bruxelles – 2012), explores the theme of invisible love, while a fifth, The Revenge of Forgiveness (La Vengeance du Pardon) (2017) concerns forgiveness. These collections are unique for the way in which, like a novel, each has a beginning, a middle and an end, each volume exploring a specific issue over several stories.

Returning to the novel in 2008 with the publication of Ulysses from Baghdad, Eric-Emmanuel Schmitt again revealed his talent for being a "chameleon story-teller" (as described by Fabienne Pascaud in the magazine Télérama) in a tale about a man who undertakes a journey such as millions make in search of a safe place to go: the story of a stowaway. A contemporary picaresque saga about the human condition, the novel ponders the question: are borders the stronghold of our identities or the last bastion of our illusions?

A keen amateur musician with a passion for Mozart, Schmitt has made his mark in the world of opera with a translation into French of two of Mozart's works: The Marriage of Figaro and Don Giovanni. He has also composed music and produced a CD.

These days, he continues to write fiction and plays but focuses on writing screenplays. Odette Toulemonde (2007), a film about happiness starring Catherine Frot and Albert Dupontel, was followed by a screen adaptation of Oscar and the Lady in Pink (2009), with Michèle Laroque, Max von Sydow, Amira Casar and Mylène Demongeot in the lead roles.

Schmitt is one of the most widely read and performed contemporary French-language authors in the world. His works have been translated into 45 languages and staged in over 50 countries. His plays are constantly being put on in new productions and revivals in both national and private theatres throughout the world and are now part of contemporary repertoire.

In January 2012, Schmitt announced that he was taking over as director of the Théâtre Rive Gauche in association with the producer and actor, Bruno Metzger. Following a period of renovation and refurbishment, the Théâtre Rive Gauche opened its doors in September 2012 and now hosts contemporary productions.

On Saturday 9 June 2012, the Royal Academy of French Language and Literature of Belgium awarded Eric-Emmanuel Schmitt Seat 33 (foreign literary member) replacing Hubert Nyssen; Seat 33 was once occupied by Anna de Noailles, Colette and Jean Cocteau. The public session and reception was held on 25 May 2013.

In 2015, he published Night of Fire, an account of the revelation he experienced in the Ahaggar Desert in 1989 and which turned the former atheist into a believer. He now declares himself to be an "agnostic who believes". In answer to the question "Does God exist?" he replies, "I don't know but I think so." In 2016 Eric-Emmanuel Schmitt was unanimously elected by his peers member of the jury of the Prix Goncourt, he occupies Edmonde Charles-Roux's cover and published a detective novel about violence and the sacred, The Man Who Could See Through Faces (L'Homme qui voyait à travers les visages).

In the spring of 2017, he talked publicly about his childhood and adolescence in When I Grow Up, I'm Going to be a Child (Plus tard, je serai un enfant), a book of interviews produced by Catherine Lalanne.

Schmitt has outlined an eight-volume epic, titled The Passage Through Time, recounting the history of humanity. To date, only the first four parts have been published, namely Paradis perdus (2021) — English title, Paradises Lost (forthcoming, 2024); La porte du ciel (“The gate of heaven”, 2021); Soleil sombre (“The dark sun”, 2022) and La lumière du bonheur (“The light of happiness”, 2024).

=== Other activities ===
In 2016, Schmitt was a commentator at the Rio Olympic Games alongside Patrick Montel, Alexandre Boyon, Stéphane Diagana and Nelson Monfort on France Télévisions.

== Awards ==
- 1994
  - France (Paris), Molière Award for the Best Show in an Independent Theatre for Le Visiteur (The Visitor).
  - France (Paris), Molière Author Award and Molière Award for the Best Newcomer for Le Visiteur.
- 1995
  - France, University of Artois first novel award for La Secte des égoïstes (The Sect of the Egoists)
- 1996
  - France (Paris), two Molière Award nominations for Variations énigmatiques (Enigma Variations).
- 1997
  - Germany, Cologne City Theatre Prize for Le Libertin (The Libertine).
  - France, six Molière Award nominations for Le Libertin.
- 1998
  - France, Balzac Academy Prize and two Molière Award nominations for Frederick ou le Boulevard du Crime (Frederick, or The Boulevard of Crime).
- 2000
  - France, seven Molière Award nominations for Hôtel des deux mondes (Between Worlds).
- 2000/2001
  - France, appointed Chevalier de l'ordre des Arts et des Lettres (Knight of the Order of Arts and Letters).
- 2001
  - France, Elle Magazine Readers' Prize for L'Evangile selon Pilate (The Gospel According to Pilate). The novel was nominated for several literary prizes in the same year.
  - France, Grand Prix du Théâtre de l'Académie française (French Academy Theatre Prize) for his literary output in its entirety.
- 2004
  - France, Readers' Prize of the Society of Authors and Literature from Lyon and the Rhône-Alpes.
  - France, Jean-Bernard Prize from the French Academy of Medicine for Oscar et la Dame rose (Oscar and the Lady in Pink).
  - France, Chronos Prize for Oscar et la Dame rose.
  - France, Lire Magazine conducted a survey of French citizens to find out which "books changed their lives". Oscar et la Dame rose was cited along with the Bible, The Three Musketeers and The Little Prince.
  - Germany, Deutscher Bücherpreis – Publikumspreis (Audience Choice in the German Book Awards) for his novella Mr Ibrahim and the Flowers of the Koran.
  - Germany, Die Quadriga Prize for "his humanity and the wisdom which his humour brings people".
- 2005
  - Switzerland, Chronos Prize for Oscar et la Dame rose.
  - France, nomination for the Molière Best Actor Award for L'Evangile selon Pilate.
  - France, Rotary Prize for L'Enfant de Noé (Noah's Child).
- 2006
  - Belgium, Foreigners' Prize awarded by the Scriptores Christiani (Christian Writers) for Milarepa; Oscar and the Lady in Pink, Mr Ibrahim and the Flowers of the Koran; and The Visitor.
- 2009
  - France, Meung-sur-Loire for Ulysse Bagdad (Ulysses from Baghdad), prix des Grands Espaces.
  - Italy, Italy, Scrivere per Amore Prize, for La Rêveuse d'Ostende (The Woman with the Bouquet).
- 2010
  - France, France, Goncourt Short Story Prize for Concerto à la mémoire d'un ange (Concerto to the Memory of an Angel).
  - Russia, Russia, The Reading Petersburg Prize for his work in its entirety.
- 2012
  - Spain, Spain, Ola de Oro Prize for his film Oscar et la Dame rose.
  - France, France, Agrippa-d'Aubigné Prize, awarded by the Lions Club for his book La Femme au miroir (Three Women in a Mirror).
  - France, France, Grand Prix Ardua 2012, awarded by the Regional Society of Aquitaine Graduates.
- 2013
  - Ukraine, Ukraine, received a medal for his contribution to cultural and artistic development (the most prestigious Ukrainian cultural award).
- 2014
  - Poland, Poland, Reading Ambassador Prize, awarded by the Polish Book Institute.
- 2016
  - Belgium, Belgium 21 July 2016, he was made Commander of the Order of the Crown by King Philippe of Belgium.
  - Canada, Canada, 22 November 2016, received an honorary doctorate from the University of Sherbrooke.
- 2017
  - France, France, Paris-Lyon Group Literary Prize.

== Bibliography ==
=== Novels ===
- The Sect of the Egoists ("La Secte des égoïstes", 1994)
- The Gospel According to Pilate ("L'Évangile selon Pilate", 2000), Grand prix des lectrices de Elle
- The Alternative Hypothesis ("La part de l'autre", 2001)
- When I Was a Work of Art ("Lorsque j'étais une œuvre d'art", 2002)
- My Life with Mozart ("Ma vie avec Mozart", 2005)
- Ulysses from Baghdad ("Ulysse from Bagdad", 2008)
- ("La Femme au miroir", 2011)
- ("Les Perroquets de la place d'Arezzo", 2013)
- ("L'Élixir d'amour", 2014)
- ("Le poison d'amour", 2014)
- ("La nuit de feu", 2015)
- ("L'Homme qui voyait à travers les visages", 2016)
- ("La Traversée des temps - tome 1 - Paradis perdus", 2021)
- ("La Traversée des temps - tome 2 - La Porte du ciel", 2021)
- ("La Traversée des temps - tome 3 - Soleil sombre", 2022)
- ("La Traversée des temps - tome 4 - La Lumière du bonheur", 2024)

=== Narratives ===
The Cycle of the Invisible ("Le Cycle de l'invisible")

- Milarepa ("Milarepa", 1997)
- Monsieur Ibrahim and the Flowers of the Koran ("Monsieur Ibrahim et les fleurs du Coran", 2001)
- Oscar and the Lady in Pink ("Oscar et la Dame rose", 2002)
- Noah's Child ("L'enfant de Noé", 2003)
- The Sumo Wrestler Who Could Not Gain Weight ("Le Sumo qui ne pouvait pas grossir", 2009)
- Ten Children Ms. Ming Never Had ("Les Dix Enfants que madame Ming n'a jamais eus", 2012)
- ("Madame Pylinska et le Secret de Chopin", 2018)
- ("Félix et la source invisible", 2019)

=== Short stories ===
- The Most Beautiful Book in the World ("Odette Toulemonde et autres histoires", 2006)
- The Woman with the Booklet ("La Rêveuse d'Ostende", 2007)
- Concerto in Memory of an Angel ("Concerto à la mémoire d'un ange, 2010)
- Invisible Love ("Les Deux Messieurs de Bruxelles, 2012), translated by Howard Curtis, Europa Editions, 2014
- Le Poison d'amour (2014)
- L'Elixir d'amour (2014)
- La Vengeance du pardon (2017)
- La Rivale (2023)

=== Tales ===
- La Nuit de feu (2015)
- Journal d'un amour perdu (2019)
- Le Défi de Jérusalem (2023)

=== Autobiography ===
- My Life with Mozart ("Ma vie avec Mozart", 2005)

=== Essays ===
- Diderot or the Philosophy of Seduction ("Diderot ou la philosophie de la séduction", 1997)

=== Theater plays ===
- Don Juan on Trial ("La nuit de Valognes", 1991)
- The Visitor ("Le Visiteur", 1993)
- Golden Joe ("Golden Joe", 1995)
- Enigma Variations ("Variations énigmatiques", 1996)
- The Libertine ("Le Libertin", 1997)
- Frederick or the Crime Boulevard ("Frédérick ou le Boulevard du Crime", 1998)
- The Devil's School ("L'École du diable", 1999)
- Between Worlds ("Hôtel des deux mondes", 1999)
- The Gag ("Le Bâillon", 2000)
- One Thousand and One Days ("Mille et un jours", 2001)
- Partners in crime ("Petits crimes conjugaux", 2004)
- Sentimental Tectonics ("La tectonique des sentiments", 2008)
- ("Le Bossu", 2008) -- from a novel by Paul Féval)
- ("Milady", 2010)
- ("Kiki van Beethoven", 2010)
- ("Le Journal d'Anne Frank", 2012) -- from The Diary of Anne Frank
- ("Un homme trop facile", 2013)
- ("The Guitrys", 2013)
- ("La trahison d'Einstein", 2014)
- ("Georges et Georges", 2014)
- ("Si on recommençait", 2014)
- ("Le joueur d'échecs", 2014) -- from The Royal Game by Stefan Zweig
- ("L'Élixir d'amour, 2015)
- ("Hibernatus, 2015)
- ("Vingt-quatres heures de la vie d'une femme, 2015) from Twenty-Four Hours in the Life of a Woman by Stefan Zweig
- ("Libres sont les papillons, 2016) from Butterflies are Free by Leonard Gershe
- ("Bungalow 21, 2023)

=== Opera translations ===
- Les Noces de Figaro
- Don Giovanni

== Selected filmography ==
- Oscar and the Lady in Pink (2009) - also director
- Odette Toulemonde (2006) - also director
- Monsieur Ibrahim (2003)
- The Libertine (2000)
