= Oscar and the Lady in Pink (film) =

- Theatrical release poster
- Oscar et la dame rose
- Directed by: Éric-Emmanuel Schmitt
- Written by: Éric-Emmanuel Schmitt
- Produced by: Philippe Godeau
- Starring: Michèle Laroque; Amir Ben Abdelmoumen
- Cinematography: Virginie Saint-Martin
- Edited by: Philippe Bourgueil
- Music by: Michel Legrand
- Production company: Pan-Européenne
- Distributed by: Wild Bunch Distribution
- Release date: 9 December 2009 (France)
- Running time: 105 minutes
- Countries: France; Belgium; Canada
- Language: French
- Budget: $9.4 million
- Box office: $2.5 million

Oscar and the Lady in Pink (French: Oscar et la dame rose) is a 2009 French-Belgian-Canadian drama film written and directed by Éric-Emmanuel Schmitt. It is based on the novel with the same name.

== Cast ==
- Michèle Laroque: Rose
- Amir Ben Abdelmoumen: Oscar
- Max von Sydow: Dr. Dusseldorf
- Amira Casar: Mrs. Gommette
- Constance Dollé: Oscar's Mother
- Jérôme Kircher: Oscar's father
- Mylène Demongeot: Lily, Rose's mother
- Benoît Brière: The announcer
- Mathilde Goffart: Peggy Blue
- Thierry Neuvic: Victor
