= Oscar and the Lady in Pink (novel) =

2002 novel by Éric-Emmanuel Schmitt

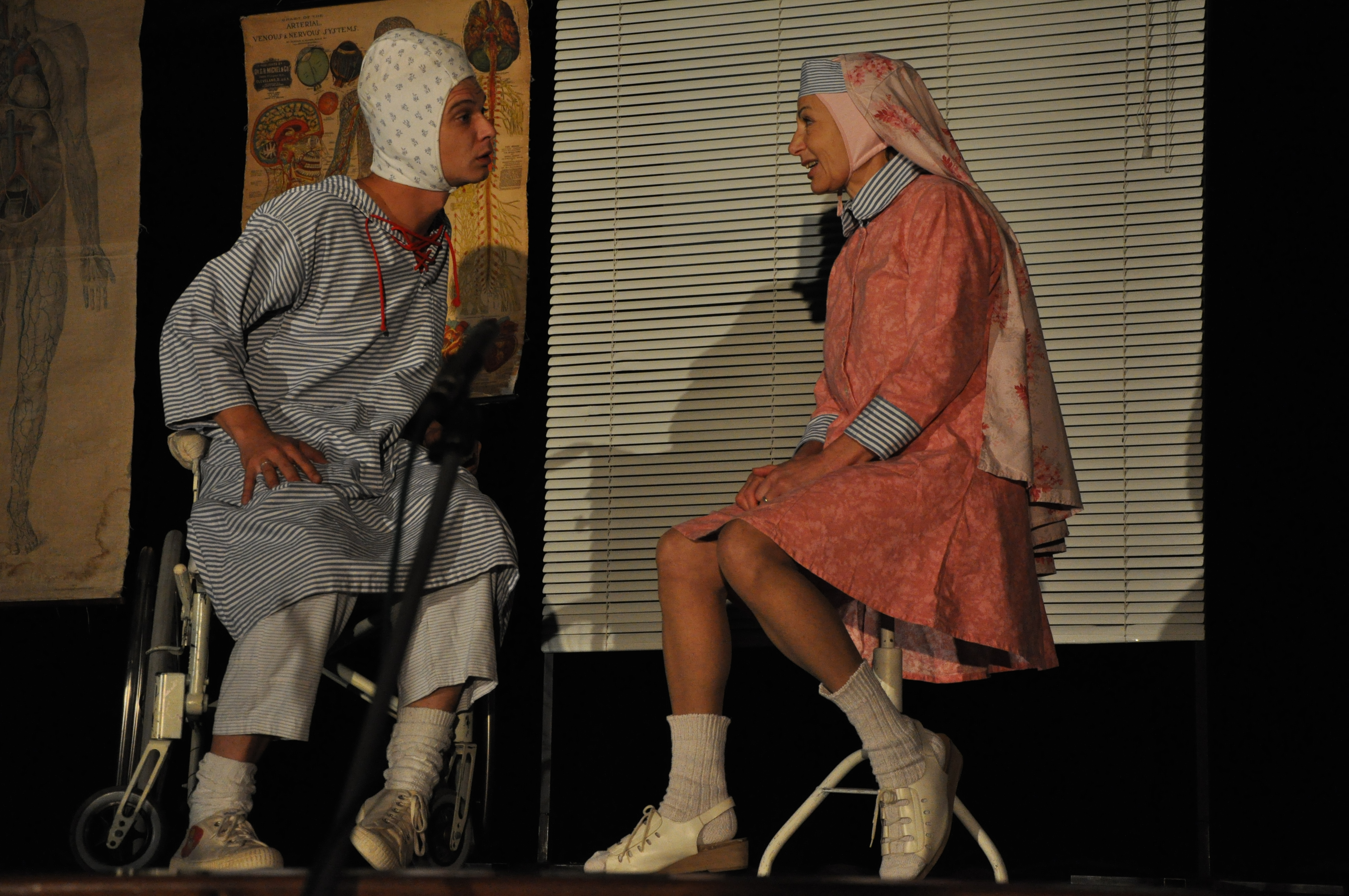
- Oscar and the Lady in Pink on theatre.
- Author: Éric-Emmanuel Schmitt
- Original title: Oscar et la dame rose
- Language: French
- Series: Cycle de l'invisible
- Genre: Drama
- Published: 2002 (French)
- Publication place: France
- Pages: 100

Oscar and the Lady in Pink (French: Oscar et la dame rose) is a novel written by Éric-Emmanuel Schmitt, the third part of the series « Cycle de l'invisible », published in 2002.

It was adapted into a theatre production by the author in 2003, with Danielle Darieux and Anny Duperey in France, Jacqueline Bir in Belgium, and Rita Lafontaine in Quebec, and then to the movies in 2009 with Michèle Laroque who was Grandma (Granny Pink or Mamie-Rose).

== Summary ==
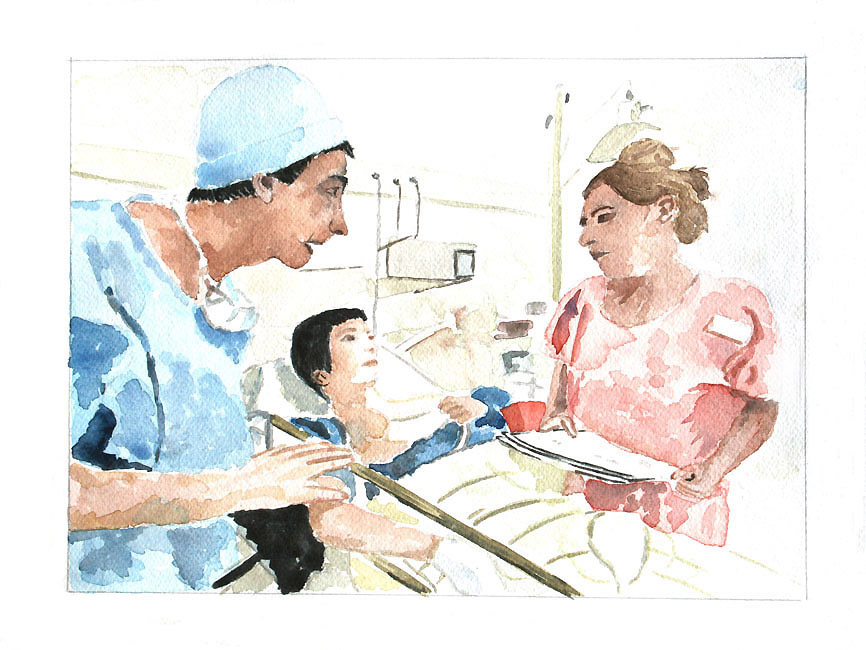
Visit of the practitioner and the nurse in pink (Marie-Claire Lefébure).

A young boy named Oscar lives in the hospital, because he suffers from leukemia. He writes letters to God to talk about his life at the hospital.

=== Synopsis ===
Oscar, a ten-year-old boy, lives in a children's hospital, with volunteer nurses called "Pink Ladies" and Mamie-Rose, being the oldest Pink Lady. She is retired but still actively volunteering with this group. After a failed bone marrow transplant, he thinks he is doomed. He talks about his future death to his family and staff. All turn a deaf ear to the word "death" with the exception of Mamie-Rose, formerly called "Strangler of Languedoc" thanks to her skills as a wrestler, who confirms that he will die. Mamie-Rose then proposes to write letters to God by writing a wish of "feeling" every day. The next day, Oscar's parents come to the hospital and learn from Doctor Düsseldorf that Oscar is indeed sentenced and that he will die in 12 days. They do not even want to kiss their son. Oscar, who overheard this conversation, is furious and calls them "cowards". He does not want to see his parents anymore. At the end of the day, Mamie-Rose comes to visit Oscar and tells him that she has been allowed to visit him for the next 12 days. She invents a game that will allow him to enjoy his life at any age: every day for him will have a duration of 10 years. Oscar accepts and asks in his letter to God to visit him. During his "adolescence" (the next day), Oscar admits to Mamie-Rose that he really likes a girl named Peggy Blue.

Will Oscar confess his feelings? Will he reconcile with his parents?

The book explains his passage from atheism to belief, and from selfishness to altruism.

== The letters (each chapter) ==
=== First letter ===
In the first letter, Oscar meets a Pink Lady named Mamie-Rose who claims to have been a wrestler named "Strangler of Languedoc" in her prime years. Now she is incredibly old; in fact, she is the oldest of all the Pink Ladies. Unlike the rest of the hospital staff, Mamie-Rose does not deny that Oscar has only a short time to live. Together, they talk about death, and she convinces him to start writing letters to God about his feelings.

=== Second letter ===
As Oscar is sick, his parents visit him only on Sunday. One day, his parents come to the hospital, on a day that isn't Sunday, as usual, and instead of visiting him, without even greeting Oscar, they talk to Dr. Düsseldorf, who tells them that the death of Oscar is inevitable. His parents are too depressed to go see him after learning that there is no chance to save him. Unfortunately, by hiding behind the door, Oscar has secretly heard the conversation and is disappointed by his parents, whom he calls cowards. Later, he talks to Mamie-Rose about his problems with his parents and tells her that he hates them. In addition, Oscar asks her to come and see him every day and she actually gets permission to do so. To help Oscar enjoy the rest of his life, Mamie-Rose invents a game: from this day, every day counts for ten years; in this way, he has the opportunity to experience all stages of life. He does this during the last twelve days of the year.

=== Third letter ===
At age thirty, Oscar marries Peggy. During the night Oscar hears noises and thinks that Peggy is being tormented by ghosts, so he gets up and goes to her room in order to protect her. When he arrives at her room, he realizes that the screaming is coming from Bacon and not from Peggy. Peggy explains that she always assumed that Oscar was the one screaming in the night. Oscar and Peggy decide to sleep in the same bed, much to the horror of the medical staff who discover them in the morning. Fortunately, Mamie-Rose arrives to defend the children.

Later in the day, Mamie-Rose brings Oscar to a chapel, where she shows him that death doesn't have to be a moral suffering. Oscar finishes his letter by asking that Peggy will be alright after her operation.

=== Fourth letter ===
Peggy Blue is operated on this day. The operation is successful, and the doctors say that over days she will become more and more pink. Oscar meets Peggy's parents, his in-laws. Before they leave, they tell him that they can count on him to protect their daughter. Oscar also decides to "adopt" Mamie-Rose, as he did with Bernard, his teddy bear. At the end of this day, he is 40 years old.

=== Sixth letter ===
Popcorn, who is jealous of Oscar and Peggy, convinces Sandrine to tell Peggy that she and Oscar have kissed. Oscar tries to defend himself, but Peggy breaks up with him anyhow. Later that day Brigitte, a child with Down syndrome, comes to his room and kisses him. Einstein sees this and tells Peggy and Sandrine, and soon all of his friends see him as a player. Mamie-Rose comforts Oscar, telling him that it is common behavior for middle aged adults, and Oscar resolves to reconcile with Peggy.

=== Seventh letter ===
On Christmas Day, Oscar tells Peggy that she is the only one that he loves, and she forgives him. Even though it is Christmas, Oscar doesn't want to see his parents, so he devises a scheme. Oscar, with the help of his friends Bacon, Einstein, and Popcorn, sneaks into Mamie-Rose's car. Mamie-Rose finds Oscar once she arrives home and convinces Oscar to let her call his parents. Oscar spends Christmas at Mamie-Rose's house with the company of his parents.

=== Eighth, ninth, and tenth letter ===
From age 70 to 80, Oscar spends time thinking. Of course, Mamie-Rose helps him think. Finally Oscar takes the debt of Dr. Düsseldorf who has feelings of guilt because he can not cure him. Then comes a difficult time that begins for him, because Peggy's operation is successful and she goes home with her parents.

=== Eleventh letter ===
Finally Oscar receives the visit of God at dawn, when he repels the night. At that moment, Oscar understands the difference between God and men: God is tireless and men are never tired. In addition, God tells him his secret: "to look at the world every day as if it were the first time" and Oscar follows his advice.

=== Twelfth letter ===
At one hundred years old, he tries to explain to his parents that life is a strange gift. At first, we overestimate it and we believe that we will live forever. Then we underestimate life, finding it rotten and too short. Finally, we learn that life is not a gift, just a loan, so we need to appreciate it.

=== Thirteenth letter ===
Oscar is one hundred and ten years old, and admits, "I think I'm starting to die". This is the last letter he writes. He dies at the end of this letter.

=== Fourteenth letter ===
This time it's Mamie-Rose who is writing instead of Oscar. She tells God that Oscar died and died while his family went to have coffee. He did that while they were there to avoid the violence of that moment. She says she can not compare her grief with the insurmountable one of Oscar's parents. At the end of the letter, she says that he had deposited the word on his table for three days: "Only God has the right to wake me up". He becomes a believer in God.

== Characters ==
- Oscar, nicknamed Egg head, because he is bald with cancer, is the main character
- Mamie-Rose, nicknamed the Strangler of Languedoc (she claims to have wrestled)
- Oscar's parents
- Peggy Blue, a girl with Eisenmenger Syndrome, Oscar's lover
- Popcorn, the obese (at the hospital to lose weight)
- Einstein, the hydrocephalic, the one with the larger than normal head
- Bacon, the burnt kid
- Sandrine, the other leukemic, the "Chinese" due to her wig
- Brigitte, the trisomic, the one with Down Syndrome
- Dr. Düsseldorf, Oscar's doctor
- The parents of Peggy Blue; also Oscar's parents-in-law

== Editions ==
=== Original print edition ===
- Éric Emmanuel Schmitt, Oscar and the Pink Lady, Paris, ed. Albin Michel, October 29, 2002, 100 p., 13 cm × 20 cm (ISBN 2-226-13502-2)

=== Audio book ===
- Eric Emmanuel Schmitt, Oscar and the Pink Lady, Paris, Naive Books, April 15, 2005 (ISBN 2-35021-004-9)
  - Full Text; narrator: Éric-Emmanuel Schmitt; support: 2 MP3 audio compact discs; duration: approximately 2 h 0 min;
- Eric Emmanuel Schmitt, Oscar and the Pink Lady, Paris, Audiolib, October 11, 2017 (ISBN 978-2-367-62448-8)
  - Full Text; narrator: Éric-Emmanuel Schmitt; support: 2 MP3 audio compact discs; duration: approximately 2 h 46 min;

=== Annotated School Edition ===
- Eric Emmanuel Schmitt, Oscar and the Pink Lady, Paris, Magnard, coll. "Classics & Contemporaries" (no. 79), May 10, 2006, 120 p. (ISBN 978-2-210-75490-4)

== Translations ==
The story has been translated into Afrikaans, Albanian, German, English, French, Low German, Basque, Belarusian, Bulgarian, Castilian, Chinese, Korean, Croatian, Danish, Estonian, Finnish, Georgian, Greek, Hungarian, Icelandic, Italian, Japanese, Latvian, Lithuanian, Maltese, Dutch, Norwegian, Persian, Polish, Portuguese, Romanian, Russian, Serbian, Slovenian, Swedish, Swahili, Czech, Turkish, Vietnamese, Uzbek, Ukrainian and Armenian.

== Film ==
The author created a film in 2009 (Oscar and the Lady in Pink) based on the novel with Michèle Laroque in the role of Mamie-Rose.
