= Kamen Donev =

Kamen Ivanchev Donev
- Born: 15 April 1971 (age 54); Rousse, Bulgaria
- Occupation(s): Actor, Film director, Dramaturgist, Choreographer

Kamen Ivanchev Donev (Bulgarian: Камен Иванчев Донев; born 15 April 1971) is a Bulgarian actor, film director, dramaturgist, and choreographer.

== Education and Career ==
Donev studied acting at NATFIZ, graduating in 1993. Between 1994 and 2009, he was an actor in the Bulgarian Army Theatre (Bulgarian: Театър „Българска армия“). In 2000 and 2001, Donev was part of the cast of the TV show "The Street" (Bulgarian: Улицата), which was directed by Tedy Moskov. He is well-known for his comic sketches.
