= L'Ecot =

Village

L'Écot
- Hamlet
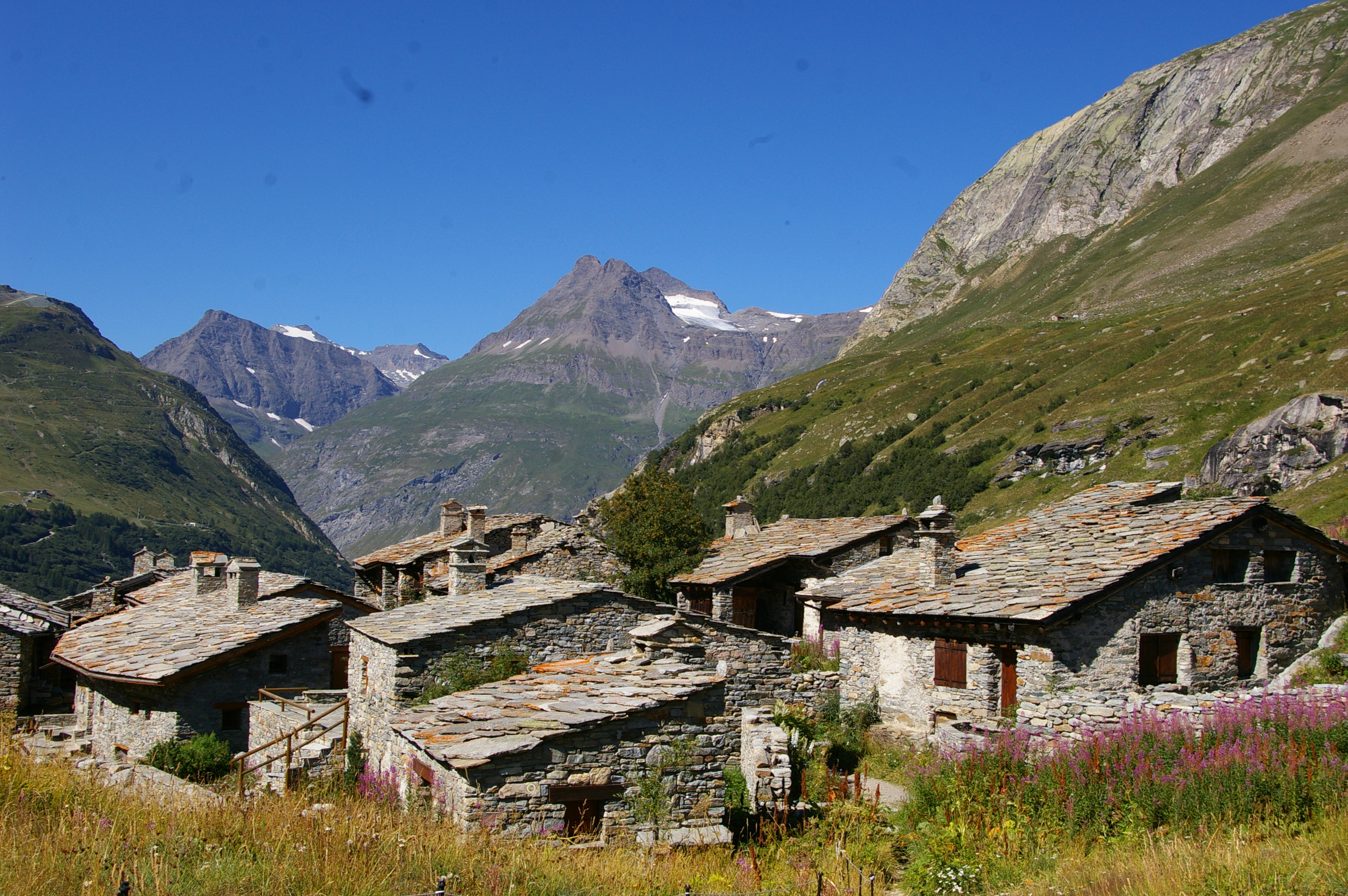

- Location in Auvergne-Rhône-Alpes
- Coordinates: 45°22′49″N 7°5′16″E
- Country: France
- Region: Auvergne-Rhône-Alpes
- Department: Savoie
- Arrondissement: Saint-Jean-de-Maurienne
- Commune: Bonneval-sur-Arc
- Elevation: 2,030 m (6,660 ft)
- Time zone: UTC+1 (CET)
  - Summer (DST): UTC+2 (CEST)
- Website: Le hameau de l'Ecot

L'Ecot (French: L'Écot) is a small mountain hamlet located in the commune of Bonneval-sur-Arc, in the Haute Maurienne Valley, Savoie, southeastern France. Located at about 2,030 m (6,660 ft) above sea level, it lies approximately 2-mi (4 km) by path from Bonneval-sur-Arc. The hamlet is known for its intact Alpine stone houses and traditional mountain setting. It has been classified as a protected site since 1971 due to its well-preserved mountain architecture. L'Ecot is also part of the Vanoise National Park (French: Parc National de la Vanoise).

== Etymology ==
The toponym L'Ecot is derived from the French word écot, which is attested as early as the Middle Ages, under the form escot, referring to a "contribution or share to be paid in a collective expense." This term has origins in several languages, including: Walloon sico; Provençal escot; Spanish and Italian escote; late Latin scotum; and, Old Germanic scot. These words are all connected to the concept of sharing and communal responsibility.

In the context of Alpine and Franco-Provencal toponymy, the word écot or escot could also designate a cultivated area, meaning land that has been prepared for agriculture or pasture after the removal of forests. This interpretation is supported by the traditional use of similar terms in Savoie, where they frequently appear in local place names to indicate small hamlets or cultivated plots of land in mountainous terrain.

Given the historical context of mountain settlements in the Haute-Maurienne, the name of the hamlet L'Ecot could reflect either the idea of a share to pay, associated with communal obligations, or, more likely, the identification of land that had been cleared for human habitation or livestock grazing. Cleared spaces were often located for their accessibility to pastures and protection from harsh alpine conditions. In the absence of direct historical documentation for this particular hamlet, this etymological explanation remains hypothetical, though it aligns with broader patterns observed in the naming of Alpine settlements and agricultural sites.

== Location ==
L'Ecot is located near the Col de l'Iseran which forms a passage between the Haute-Maurienne and Tarentaise valleys. L'Ecot lies close to several notable settlements. The closest is Bonneval-sur-Arc, located 1.24-mile (2 km) away, a small alpine village of about 250 inhabitants that administers the hamlet within its municipal boundaries. Around 12 mi (20 km) down the Arc valley is Val-Cenis, a major resort community, comprising several villages with a population of over 2,200 residents, and approximately 27 mi (45 km) away from Modane, the principal urban centre of the Haute-Maurienne valley. The hamlet is located at the end of the departmental road D902, which continues beyond Bonneval-sur-Arc. During winter, access is generally closed due to snow, and the hamlet can only be reached on foot or on skis.

During summer, to limit the negative impacts of tourism on the natural environment, road access to the hamlet is regulated. The road leading from Bonneval-sur-Arc is subject to limited traffic. A shuttle service connects Bonneval-sur-Arc to L'Ecot during the tourist season. Several marked trails, including the 'Sentier des Agneaux', allow visitors to explore the area, promoting environmentally friendly tourism. The hamlet lies near the sources of the Arc and is surrounded by several high peaks of the Vanoise Massif, including the Albaron (11 935,7 ft - 3,638 m) and the Ouille Noire (11 036 ft - 3,364 m). The site is also part of an awareness-raising policy led by the local tourist office, in collaboration with the Vanoise National Park, as part of a sustainable tourism initiative.

== History ==
Archaeological traces such as cupules on glacially polished rocks show that humans used the area long before the Middle Ages. Local histories also says that Piedmontese shepherds began using the pastures in early medieval times.

During the Second World War, L'Ecot, like the rest of the Haute Maurienne valley, was directly affected by the conflict. Owing to its proximity to the French–Italian frontier, the hamlet was occupied first by Italian forces between 1940 and 1943, and subsequently by the German army until the liberation of the valley in 1944.

L'Ecot remained inhabited year-round until the mid-20th century. From the 1950s onward, many dwellings shifted to seasonal use as year-round residency declined, a trend that continued until restoration initiatives encouraged renewed occupation in recent decades. Preservation efforts gained momentum after the hamlet was designated a protected site in 1971, a status that contributed to safeguarding its traditional stone architecture and historic layout.

== Transhumance and Pastoral heritage ==
L'Ecot was one of the traditional regions in the French Alps used for seasonal livestock movement, forming part of the region's historic transhumance system. These designated areas were exclusively allocated for grazing herds during the summer season, facilitating farmers' efficient utilisation of high-altitude pastures while simultaneously conserving lower valley fields for the purpose of crop cultivation.

The organisational structure of L'Ecot embodies the enduring pastoral legacy of the Maurienne and Tarentaise regions, where communal stewardship of grazing land fostered sustainable livestock management practices. This seasonal rhythm influenced the architecture of L'Ecot. Houses were built closer together for warmth and preservation of livestock. Dry-wall enclosures, walkways, and barns are still visible to this day to reflect the use of ancient pastoral traditions.

Although pastoralism on a large scale declined in the 20th century, transhumance remains symbolically and ecologically significant. The Vanoise National Park and the Haute-Maurienne Tourist Office support projects that promote pastoral heritage, guided walks, and awareness events about traditional herding practices. Seasonal shepherds and animateurs pastoraux.

== Climate ==
The climate at the hamlet of L'Ecot. This table may vary due to high mountain climate. More precise climate information is available at the nearby commune of Bonneval-sur-Arc, approximately 1,24 mi (2 km) away.

Climate data for Bonneval-sur-Arc
Month	Jan	Feb	Mar	Apr	May	Jun	Jul	Aug	Sep	Oct	Nov	Dec	Year
Mean daily maximum °C (°F)	−2 (28)	0 (32)	4 (39)	7 (45)	12 (54)	17 (63)	19 (66)	18 (64)	14 (57)	10 (50)	3 (37)	−1 (30)	8 (47)
Mean daily minimum °C (°F)	−8 (18)	−6 (21)	−3 (27)	0 (32)	4 (39)	9 (48)	11 (52)	10 (50)	7 (45)	3 (37)	−3 (27)	−7 (19)	1 (35)
Average precipitation mm (inches)	110 (4.3)	95 (3.7)	100 (3.9)	120 (4.7)	140 (5.5)	150 (5.9)	140 (5.5)	130 (5.1)	120 (4.7)	110 (4.3)	100 (3.9)	110 (4.3)	1,425 (55.8)
Average snowy days	14.5	12.5	14.7	15.1	10.4	1.7	0.6	0.6	3.2	8.2	14.5	14.2	110.2
Average relative humidity (%)	89	90	92	90	91	86	81	80	85	88	94	83	87
Mean monthly sunshine hours	9.2	10.3	11.9	13.5	14.9	15.6	15.3	14.1	12.6	11.0	9.6	8.8	146.8
Source: Meteoblue – Climate Data (ERA5T, 1792 m) • Bonneval-sur-Arc Daylength & Humidity – Wanderlog

== Architecture ==
L'Ecot retains a typical mountain style, characterised by compact houses and narrow cobbled streets that follow the natural slope of the mountain. The houses are built close together to limit exposure to the wind and cold. They were built according to the orientation of the sun: only the main façades, facing south, have openings to maximize solar heat, while the north façades remain closed to prevent heat loss.

The houses are constructed using local materials, particularly gneiss or schist for the walls and slate for the roofing. Each house is divided into three distinct levels: a ground floor, an upper floor, and an attic. These three floors served specific functions. The ground floor was utilised for agricultural purposes, housing livestock during the night and winter and serving as a storage space for equipment. The heat generated by the animals provided warmth to the upper floor. Accessible via a ramp or a staircase constructed from local stone, the upper floor was dedicated to daily life and encompassed the kitchen, living room, and additional bedrooms. The attic, situated beneath the roof, was employed for storing hay and provisions, including food or seeds for agricultural purposes.

Each dwelling was equipped with a terrace, meticulously designed as discrete plots of arable land. These plots were strategically utilised for cultivating hardy cereals such as rye and barley, as well as vegetables. The diminutive dimensions of the terraces were a direct consequence of the inherent challenges associated with cultivating land at elevated altitudes. The terraces were ingeniously constructed to retain soil and moisture, thereby mitigating the likelihood of erosion and landslides that could potentially threaten the surrounding dwellings. Notably, certain terraces were repurposed as outdoor workspaces, primarily dedicated to the drying of laundry and the storage of hay for livestock.

== The Saint-Margaret chapel ==
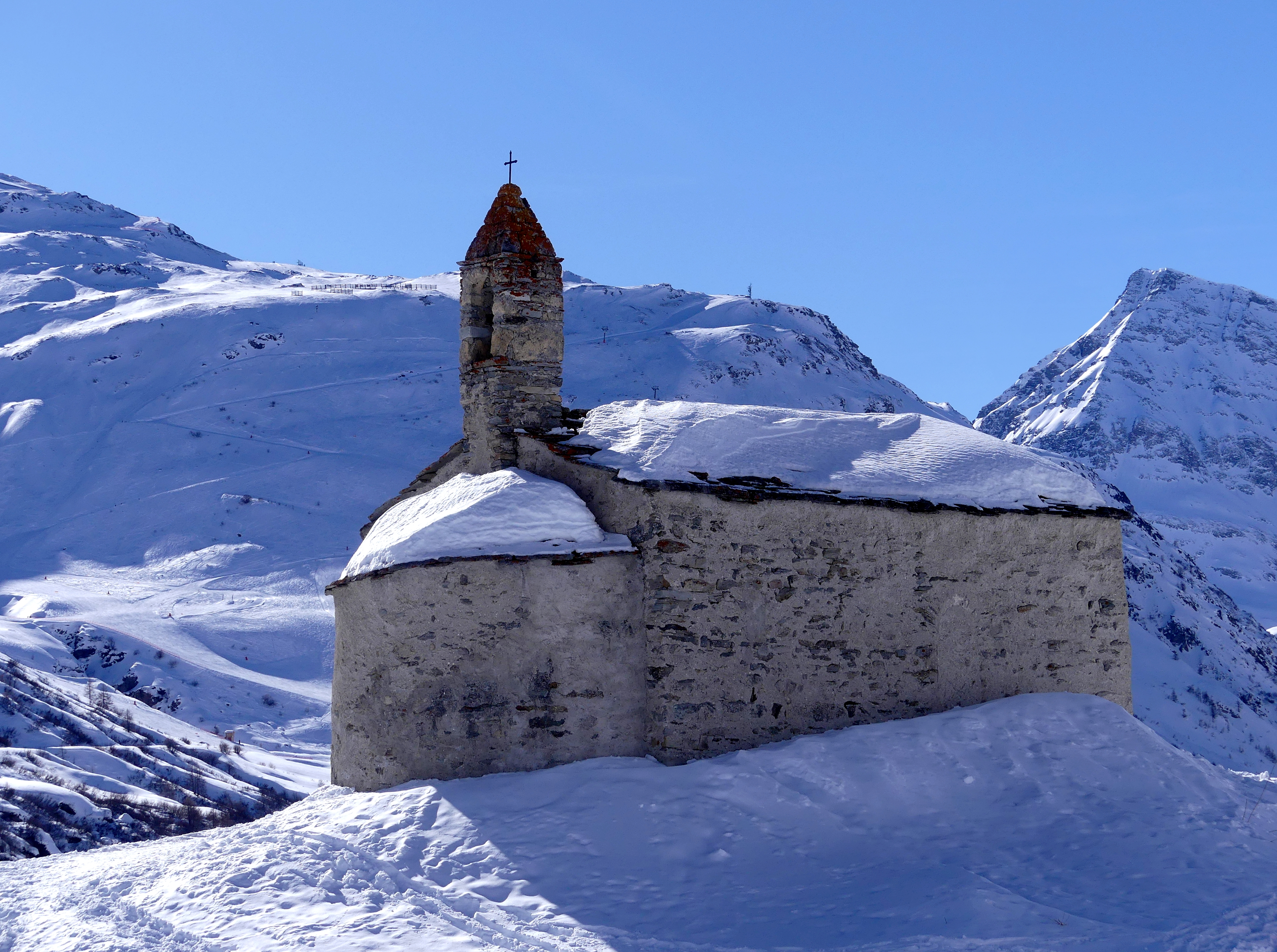
The Saint-Margaret Chapel, in winter, hamlet of L'Ecot, Haute-Maurienne, France

The Saint-Margaret Chapel overlook the hamlet of L'Ecot, from a small hill. It was constructed using local materials: walls in gneiss or schist, covered with a slate roof, larch wood framing and doors. A small bell tower overcomes the façade, housing a bell which is quite unusual for small hamlets of this type. Given its semicircular apse and medieval frescoes, the estimate is that the chapel was built around the 12th century. This is indicative of Alpine Romanesque. Ecclesiastical documents from the 15th century mention the chapel, standing witness to the age of the building.

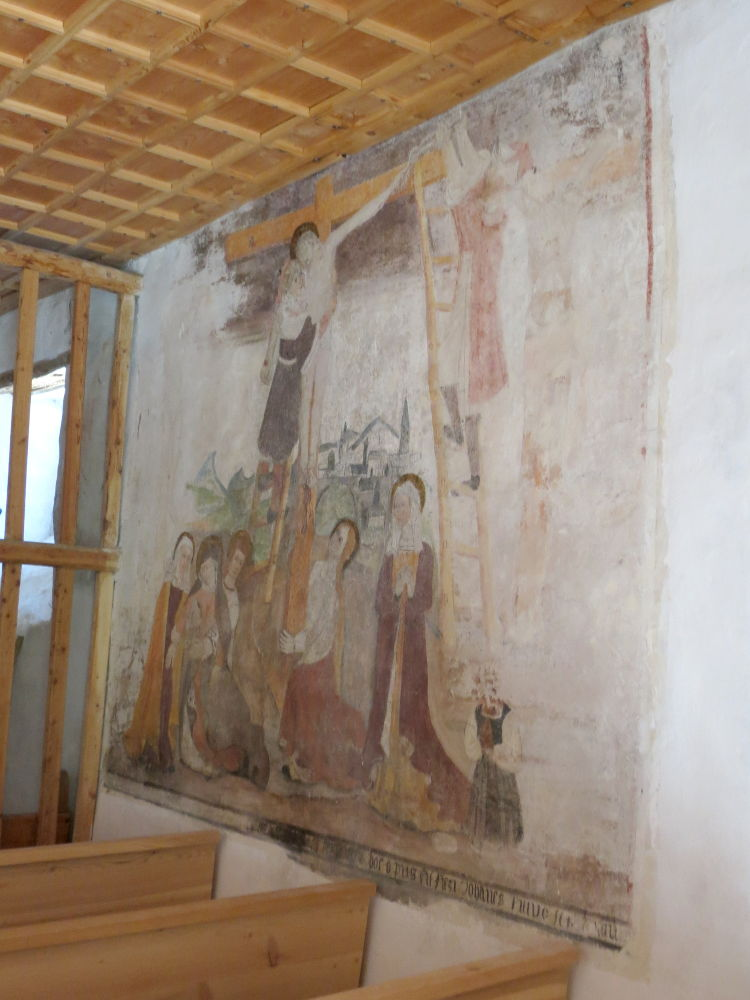
Frescoes of Saint-Margaret the Virgin in the chapel at L'Ecot, Haute-Maurienne, France

The frescoes, executed during the 19th century and discovered later in that same century, illustrate the life of Saint Margaret of Antioch, a virgin martyr who was said to have come out of the belly of the dragon that swallowed her. People were still praying, especially for childbirth and the various pains pregnant women went through. Today, invisible, these frescoes are covered with 19th-century whitewash. The chapel was a place of worship for both the hamlet's inhabitants and for shepherds and travellers who passed by it. On December 1, 1980, the Sainte-Marguerite Chapel was listed as a Monument historique through a ministerial decree issued by the French Ministry of Culture due to its architectural and cultural value within the Haute-Maurienne Valley. It is legally protected in the national heritage registry of France.

== Wildlife and Flora ==
The Arc River in winter at L'Ecot, Haute-Maurienne, France

The hamlet of L'Écot lies close to the upper course of the Arc, which rises from glaciers in the Franco-Italian Alpine frontier and flows down the Haute Maurienne Valley. The river has helped shape the surrounding landscape, its bed, banks and adjacent wetlands form a variety of habitats, from alpine meadows to riparian zones, that support a rich range of plant and animal life.

L'Ecots proximity to the Vanoise National Park makes it a place where the flora and fauna are particularly rich and well preserved. The local flora is characterized by subalpine calcifuge vegetation. The surrounding high-altitude environment supports a variety of habitats, particularly acidic (non-calcareous) soils, which allow certain alpine plants such as Pink Stonecrop (Latin: Rhodiola rosea), Starling (Latin: Bupleurum stellatum), Stinkhorn Mushroom (Latin: Thalictrum foetidum), Tansy Ragwort (Latin: Hugueninia tanacetifolia) or even Ovoid Raiponce (Latin: Phyteuma halleri) to grow. The fauna of the area also includes several protected species that are emblematic of the Alps and the Vanoise National Park, such as the Alpine Ibex (Latin: Capra ibex), Black Grouse (Latin: lyrurus tetrix), or even Golden Eagle (Latin: Aquila chrysaetos).

The fragile biodiversity requires regular scientific monitoring. The hamlet and its surroundings are among the areas monitored by teams from the Vanoise National Park. This includes technicians specialising in wildlife (responsible for tagging, monitoring and capturing animals for scientific reasons) and park rangers who carry out botanical inventories and floristic surveys. These agents, who are part of the Park's Knowledge and Management division, are responsible for preserving and studying alpine ecosystems. Surveys are carried out several times a year, depending on the reproduction or flowering cycles specific to each species, and are the subject of multi-year observation series – often over a period of five years – in order to better understand habitat changes and the effects of climate change on fauna and flora.

== Cultural Significance ==
The award-winning movies Belle and Sebastien (2013), Belle & Sebastien: The Adventure Continues (2015), and Belle and Sebastien: Friends for Life (2018), were filmed in the hamlet of L'Ecot. One of the movie directors, Nicolas Vanier, chose L'Ecot for its well-preserved cultural and architectural heritage, considering it an ideal setting for several key scenes. The release of the first film in 2013 was a commercial success and sold more than three million cinema tickets. Publicity from the Belle et Sébastien movies significantly increased cultural tourism in L'Ecot and the wider Haute-Maurienne Vanoise. The Tourist Information Office maximized the potential of this success by having guided tours of the location where the filming took place, offering tourists the possibility to experience the environment of the films and the related historical landscape of the region. The hamlet provides seasonal programs that include nature walks, exhibitions and outdoor events influenced by the film, allowing them to experience this adventure through the perspective of Belle et Sébastien. The cinematic legacy is also incorporated in a variety of heritage programs and festivals in the Haute-Maurienne Region. This includes the European Heritage Days and local film themed outdoor events.

== Local Traditions and Folklore ==
Typical of the Haute-Maurienne region, L'Ecot has localfolklore that incorporates Christian traditions with traditional agricultural beliefs. The hamlet is associated with tales of the devil, spirits and supernatural events, which relate to the environment's apparent beauty and at the same time, peril. Many of these tales relate to the hamlet's geographical features includingcairns, rivers, mountain passes and stone bridges - all of which are believed to have been carefully sculpted by supernatural entities. Folklore throughout the valley illustrates the challenges and resilience of the mountain people, their religious processions and yearly celebrations representing concrete manifestations of common principles.

Both locals and visitors are drawn to the preserved historic character of L'Écot. Nearby hiking trails leading to the alpine headwaters of the Arc offer insight into local folklore as well as natural beauty, with each site connected to religious symbolism and pastoral history. Hiking trails that lead to thealpine headwaters of the Arc, for example, offer a tour into local folklore along with natural beauty, with each site associated with religious theology and pastoral history. These customs continue to mould the identity of L'Écot and its neighbouring villages, perpetuated through oral storytelling and communal gatherings.

== Tourism ==
L'Ecot is a year-round tourist destination due to its location within the Haute-Maurienne Vanoise area, part of the Vanoise National Park. Its touristic appeal is also due to walking routes connecting L'Ecot with local alpine huts (refuges). Located at an altitude of around 6561.68 ft (2,000 metres), the hamlet is set in a high mountain environment, characterized by open mountain pastures and traditional dry stone architecture. The hamlet has largely retained its original landscape and the character of its old buildings.

L'Ecot offers is a popular destination and starting point for outdoor enthusiasts and hikers exploring the Vanoise Massif. Several hiking trails are accessible from L'Ecot, notably those leading to the Saint-Clair Bridge and a nearby waterfall, the Col des Évettes pass, and the Grand-Méan Glacier. L'Ecot is the starting point for the Haute-Maurienne Traverse, around 34 mi (55 km) ski mountaineering route leading to Villarond.

The hamlet has limited tourist services, including a restaurant located in an old farmhouse and a crêperie located in the upper part of the village. One-off events are organized there during the summer, such as concerts as part of the "Scènes estivales" program, accompanied by eco-friendly stands. Several outdoor activities are offered, including accompanied canyoning trips. The hamlet receives an estimated 25,000 to 40,000 visitors annually, with its peak during the summer season.

== Geology and Natural Landscape ==
L'Ecot is a small hamlet situated in the upper Haute-Maurienne Valley, inside the Quaternary glacial-alpine tectonic environment. The surrounding mountains represent a portion of the Main chain of the Alps and belong to the Western Alps, which extends from Lake Geneva to Grand Combin. The Mont-Blanc massif is composed of a block largely consisting of crystalline rocks, which have been modified by faulting. These rocks are an integral part of the rugged relief of the area and have received much attention in previous studies because of their significance, in Alpine geology.

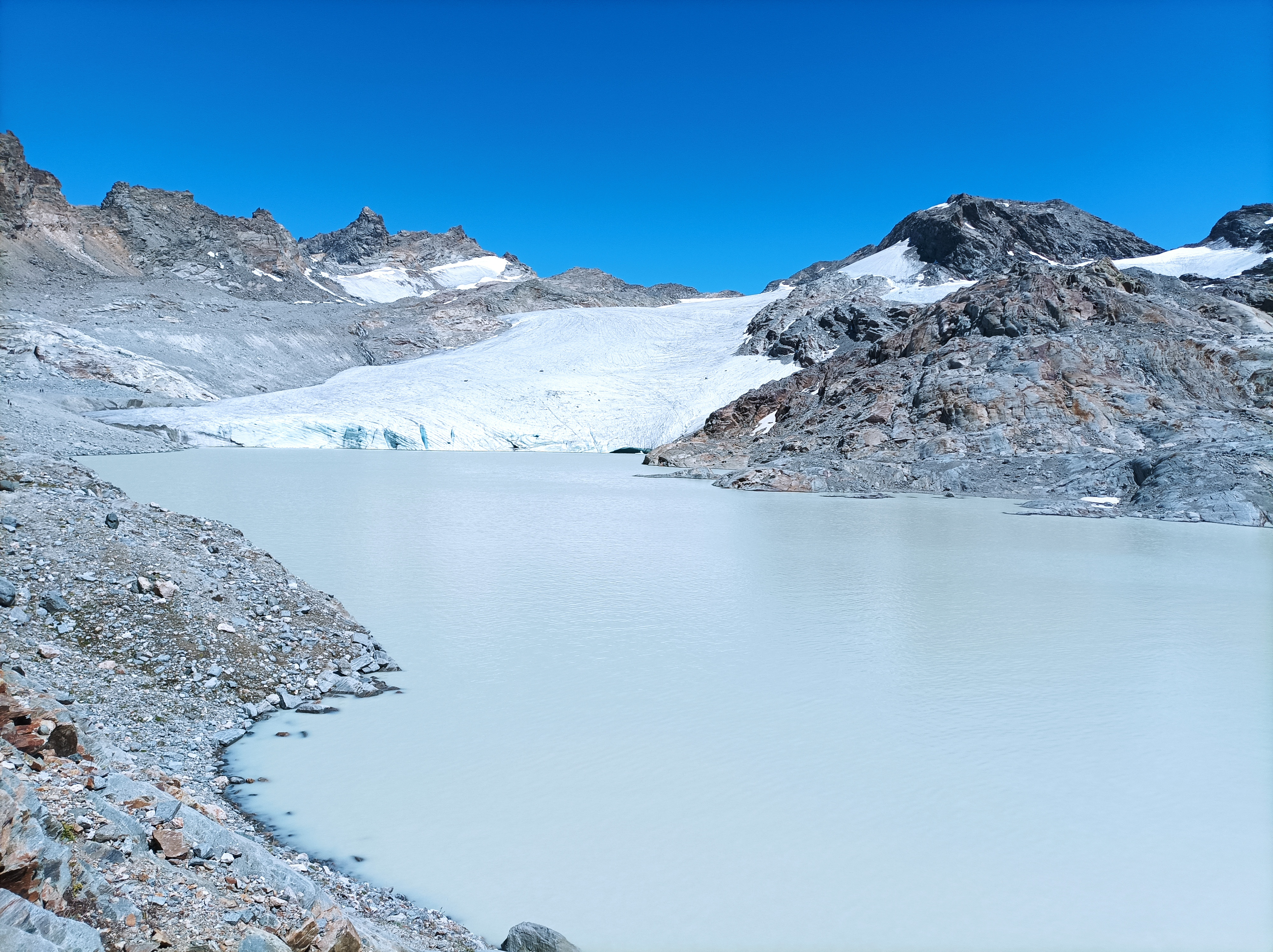
Grand-Méan Glacier, Haute-Maurienne, France

Beginning around 24,000 years and concluding approximately 10,000 years ago, at the peak of the last glacial maximum large glaciers originating from the Vanoise Massif advanced through the Arc Valley carving out a notably deep and broad glacial valley. The Ecot stands at the head of one of the glacial terraces left as these glaciers retreated and uncovered today's topography: polished bedrock, striations, and erratic boulders marking former ice limits. The close neighbors Évettes and Grand-Méan glaciers continue to serve as evidence of the glacial withdrawal, in the area.

The Hamelt is further developing under continuous periglacial changes caused by freeze-thaw mechanisms that create scree slopes, rockfalls, and frost-heave structures. The slopes are annually altered by snow creep and avalanches, while the deposition of debris at base slopes allows for the formation of alpine meadows. This active geological alteration is being studied by the Vanoise National Park through its long-term research program into the effects that climate exerts on mountain landscapes.

Because of its accessible location and striking glacial features, the Ecot's is a key research site for geologists and glaciologists who study the activity of permafrost. For its part, Vanoise National Park has provided educational trails and various interpretive panels that help the visitor understand geological processes creating the natural features of the area.

== Sociocultural Life and Restoration Efforts ==
The protected status of L'Ecot since 1971 has led to preservation efforts which aim to preserve its architectural heritage and cultural environment. The commune of Bonneval-sur-Arc together with regional authorities and the French Ministry of Culture launched restoration projects to fix frost and erosion damage on building façades and balconies and stone structures. The restoration work must adhere to specific rules which demand builders to use traditional building techniques and materials sourced from the local area.

The site hosts cultural events and educational programs which support traditional practices and proper site interaction. The initiative demonstrates a larger Savoie-wide effort where national parks unite with cultural organizations and local populations to protect and reinterpret mountain heritage through community-based initiatives.L'Ecot exists as an active high-mountain settlement which unites conservation efforts with cultural preservation and controlled tourist activities.

== See also ==
- Saint Margaret of Anthiop
