= Belle and Sebastian (disambiguation) =

Belle and Sebastian may refer to:

- Belle and Sebastian (1965 TV series), the 1965 French live-action television series about a boy named Sébastien and his unusually intelligent dog Belle
- Belle et Sébastien, 1966 novel by Cécile Aubry inspired from the above TV series
  - Belle and Sebastian (Japanese TV series), a 1981–1982 Japanese animated television series adaptation of the novel, also known as Meiken Jolie
  - Belle and Sebastian (film), a 2013 French film adaptation of the novel
  - Belle & Sebastian: The Adventure Continues, the 2015 film sequel
  - Belle and Sebastien: Friends for Life, the 2017 final film sequel
  - Belle and Sebastian (2017 TV series), a 2017 Canadian-French animated television series adaptation of the novel
- Belle and Sebastian, Scottish indie pop band formed in 1996 which took its name from the above French story
  - "Belle and Sebastian", song by the band first appearing on the Dog on Wheels EP
