= Tchéky Karyo =

French actor (1953–2025)

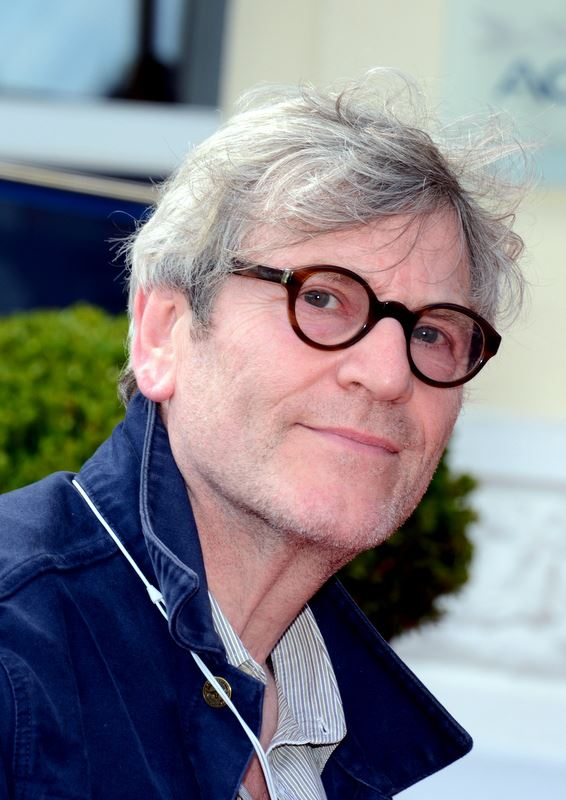
- Karyo in 2013
- Born: Baruh Djaki Karyo; 4 October 1953; Istanbul, Turkey
- Died: 31 October 2025 (aged 72); Quimper, France
- Occupations: Actor; musician
- Years active: 1982–2025
- Spouses: Isabelle Pasco (m. 1995, divorced); Valérie Keruzoré (m. 2002)
- Children: 2

Tchéky Karyo (French: [tʃeki kɑʁjo]; born Baruh Djaki Karyo; 4 October 1953 – 31 October 2025) was a Turkish-born French actor and musician. Beginning his career as an actor on stage in classical and contemporary plays, he later worked as a character actor in films in the 1980s. He acted in numerous films by Hollywood and French directors, including Luc Besson. He was nominated for a César Award for Most Promising Actor for his performance in the 1982 film La Balance.

His film credits include La Femme Nikita, Vincent and Me, Nostradamus, Crying Freeman, Bad Boys, GoldenEye, The Messenger: The Story of Joan of Arc, The Patriot and Kiss of the Dragon. His television roles include Dr. Willy Rozenbaum in the HBO film And the Band Played On, Georges Méliès in the HBO miniseries From the Earth to the Moon, and French detective Julien Baptiste in the BBC crime drama The Missing, and its spin-off series Baptiste (2019–21).

== Early life, family and education ==
Baruh Djaki Karyo was born in 1953 in Istanbul, Turkey. His mother was Greek Jewish, and his father, a delivery man and builder, was from a Turkish Sephardic Jewish family; both families had Spanish roots. When he was young, his family moved to Paris, France. The spelling of his name, Djaki, was changed to Tchéky in a form of French transliteration. At age 13, his parents separated, and his mother ordered him to leave her home as well.

He attended the Parisian secondary school Lycée Arago. As a young man, Karyo studied drama at the Cyrano Theatre, and later became a member of the Daniel Sorano Company, playing many classical roles.

== Career ==
Karyo joined the National Theatre of Strasbourg, where he starred in both contemporary and classical plays. He found success in French films beginning in the 1980s, first as a character actor. He later appeared in leading roles in several notable films, such as The Bear, in which he played one of the hunters, and director Luc Besson's La Femme Nikita, in which he played the heroine's spy mentor.

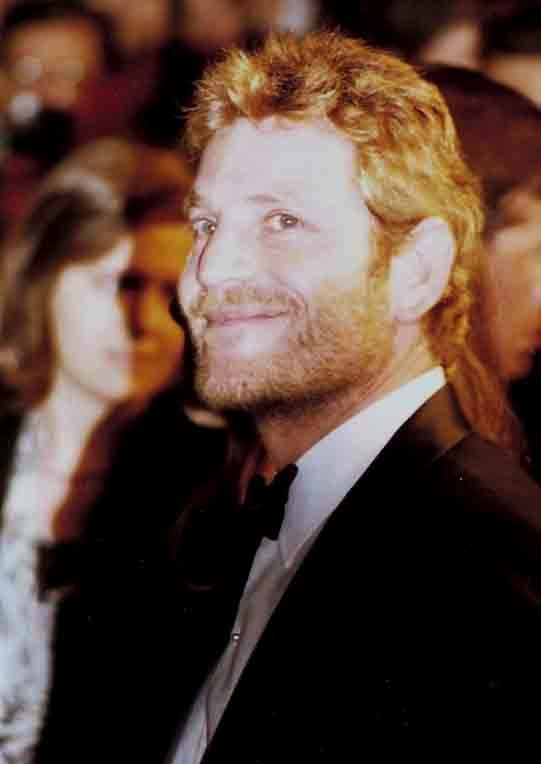
Karyo at the 17th César Awards, 1992

He has appeared in many American movies, often portraying a French character. He played the French prophet Nostradamus in Nostradamus (1994) and a criminal, Fouchet, in Bad Boys (1995) opposite Will Smith and Martin Lawrence. He played a corrupt and violent Paris police detective in Kiss of the Dragon (2001) opposite Jet Li. He has acted in prominent roles in major films set during wartime. Such performances include his acting as a vengeful French officer alongside Mel Gibson in The Patriot (2000), set during the American Revolutionary War, and his role as Jean de Dunois in The Messenger: The Story of Joan of Arc. In the DVD edition of The Patriot, Karyo overdubbed his own lines on the French-language track. He appeared in Martin Sheen's film The Way (2010) as Captain Henri.

In 2014 and 2016, Karyo appeared as Julien Baptiste in the acclaimed BBC One/Starz drama series The Missing. He has received critical praise for his performance. In April 2018, it was confirmed that Karyo would reprise his Baptiste role in a spin-off series, Baptiste, to be written by Jack and Harry Williams. The first six-episode series began on BBC One on 17 February 2019, with a second series beginning on 18 July 2021. In 2018, Karyo appeared as Elisha in Mary Magdalene, written by Helen Edmundson and directed by Garth Davis.

Karyo was also a musician and songwriter. In 2006 he released the album Ce lien qui nous unit (English: "This link that binds us"), and released Credo in 2013 on his 60th birthday.

== Awards ==
In 1982, he was nominated for a César Award for Most Promising Actor for his role in La Balance. In 1986, he was awarded the Prix Jean Gabin in recognition of his acting performances.

== Personal life and death ==
Karyo was married to Isabelle Pasco, but they divorced. In 2002, he married actress Valérie Keruzoré (23 years his junior) with whom he had two children, a daughter and a son. They were still married at the time of his death. Karyo spoke multiple languages and was fluent in French, Spanish, English and Arabic.

Karyo died of cancer in Quimper, on 31 October 2025, at the age of 72.

== Selected filmography ==
Year	Title	Role	Language	Director
1982	The Return of Martin Guerre	Augustin	French	Daniel Vigne
1982	Toute une nuit	unnamed man	French	Chantal Akerman
1982	La Balance	Petrovic	French	Bob Swaim
1983	Le Marginal	Francis Pierron	French	Jacques Deray
1984	Full Moon in Paris	Remi	French	Éric Rohmer
1985	L'Amour braque	Micky	French	Andrzej Zulawski
1986	Bleu comme l'enfer	Frank	French	Yves Boisset
1987	Sorceress	Étienne de Bourbon	French	Suzanne Schiffman
1988	The Bear	Tom	French	Jean-Jacques Annaud
1989	Australia	Julien Pierson	French	Jean-Jacques Andrien
1990	La Femme Nikita	Bob	French	Luc Besson
1990	Vincent and Me	Vincent van Gogh	French	Michael Rubbo
1991	A Grande Arte	Hermes	English / Portuguese / Spanish	Walter Salles
1991	Isabelle Eberhardt	Slimene	English	Ian Pringle
1991	Husband and Lovers	Paolo	English	Mauro Bolognini
1992	Red Shoe Diaries (TV series)	Phillip	English	Ted Kotcheff
1992	1492: Conquest of Paradise	Martín Alonso Pinzón	English	Ridley Scott
1992	L'Atlantide	Lieutenant Morhange	French	Bob Swaim
1992	Sketch Artist	Paul Korbel	English	Phedon Papamichael
1993	And the Band Played On	Willy Rozenbaum	English	Roger Spottiswoode
1994	La Cité de la peur	Monsieur Jacques, The First Projectionist	French	Alain Berbérian
1994	Nostradamus	Nostradamus	English	Roger Christian
1995	Colpo di luna	Lorenzo	Italian	Alberto Simone
1995	Crying Freeman	Detective Netah	English	Christophe Gans
1995	Bad Boys	Antoine Fouchet	English	Michael Bay
1995	GoldenEye	Russian Minister of Defence Dmitri Mishkin	English	Martin Campbell
1995	Foreign Land	Kraft	Portuguese	Walter Salles and Daniela Thomas
1995	Operation Dumbo Drop	Goddard	English	Simon Wincer
1996	To Have & to Hold	Jack	English	John Hillcoat
1997	Dobermann	Inspecteur Sauveur Cristini	French	Jan Kounen
1997	Habitat	Hank Symes	English	René Daalder
1997	Addicted to Love	Anton	English	Griffin Dunne
1998	From the Earth to the Moon (TV miniseries)	Georges Méliès	English	(various)
1998	Let There Be Light	Harper	French	Arthur Joffé
1999	My Life So Far	Gabriel Chenoux	English	Hugh Hudson
1999	Babel	Nemrod	French	Gérard Pullicino
1999	The Messenger: The Story of Joan of Arc	Jean de Dunois	English	Luc Besson
1999	Wing Commander	Commodore James "Paladin" Taggart	English	Chris Roberts
2000	Arabian Nights (TV miniseries)	Black Coda	English	Steve Barron
2000	Le Roi danse	Molière	French	Gérard Corbiau
2000	Saving Grace	Jacques Chevalier	English	Nigel Cole
2000	The Patriot	Major Jean Villeneuve	English	Roland Emmerich
2001	Kiss of the Dragon	Inspector Jean-Pierre Richard	English	Chris Nahon
2002	The Good Thief	Roger	English	Neil Jordan
2003	Utopia	Hervé	French / Spanish	María Ripoli
2003	The Core	Serge	English	Jon Amiel
2004	A Very Long Engagement	Captain Etienne Favourier	French	Jean-Pierre Jeunet
2004	Taking Lives	Chief Inspector Hugo LeClair	English	D. J. Caruso
2004	Blueberry	The Uncle	English	Jan Kounen
2005	Les Rois maudits (TV miniseries)	Philip IV of France	French	Josée Dayan
2006	The Gravedancers	Vincent Cochet	English	Mike Mendez
2007	Jacquou le Croquant	The Chevalier	French	Laurent Boutonnat
2007	Boxes	Jean	French	Jane Birkin
2007	The Lark Farm	Aram	English	Paolo and Vittorio Taviani
2009	A Man and His Dog	The Guitar Player In The Park	French	Francis Huster
2009	Kaamelott (TV series)	Manius Macrinus Firmus (Book VI)	French	Alexandre Astier
2010	The Way	Captain Henri	English	Emilio Estevez
2011	A Gang Story	Serge Suttel	French	Olivier Marchal
2011	Forces spéciales	Guezennec	French	Stéphane Rybojad
2012	No Limit (TV series)	Koskas	French	(various)
2012	Pieces of Me	Edern	French	Nolwenn Lemesle
2013	Jappeloup	Marcel Rozier	French	Christian Duguay
2013	Belle and Sebastian	César	French	Nicolas Vanier
2014	The Missing, Series 1 (TV series)	Julien Baptiste	English	Tom Shankland
2015	Through the Air	Armand Cavelle	French	Fred Grivois
2015	Belle & Sebastian: The Adventure Continues	César	French	Christian Duguay
2016	The Missing, Series 2 (TV series)	Julien Baptiste	English	Ben Chanan
2018	Mary Magdalene	Elisha	English	Garth Davis
2018	Belle and Sebastien: Friends for Life	César	French	Clovis Cornillac
2019	Baptiste – Series 1 (TV series)	Julien Baptiste	English	Börkur Sigþórsson
2019	The Name of the Rose (TV miniseries)	Pope John XXII	English	Giacomo Battiato
2020	ZeroZeroZero (TV miniseries)	François Salvage	English	(various)
2021	Baptiste – Series 2 (TV series)	Julien Baptiste	English	Thomas Napper
2022	Les Disparus de la Forêt-Noire (TV miniseries)	Franz Agerland	French	Ivan Fegyveres
2022	Women at War (TV miniseries)	Général Duvernet	French	Alexandre Laurent
2023	Liaison (TV series)	Francis Miller	French / English	Stephen Hopkins
2023	Boat Story (TV miniseries)	The Tailor	English	(various)
2024	The Killer	Tessier	French / English	John Woo
2025	Faster	Le Duc	French	Morgan S. Dalibert

== Music videos ==
- 1992 "Born on the Wrong Side of Town" Jaye Muller (J.) (directed by Jean Baptiste Mondino)
- 2005 "L'avenir est à nous" Kool Shen feat. Rohff & Dadoo (directed by J.G Biggs)
