= Denis Ivanov (filmmaker) =

Ukrainian producer, film distributor, cultural manager, and TV presenter

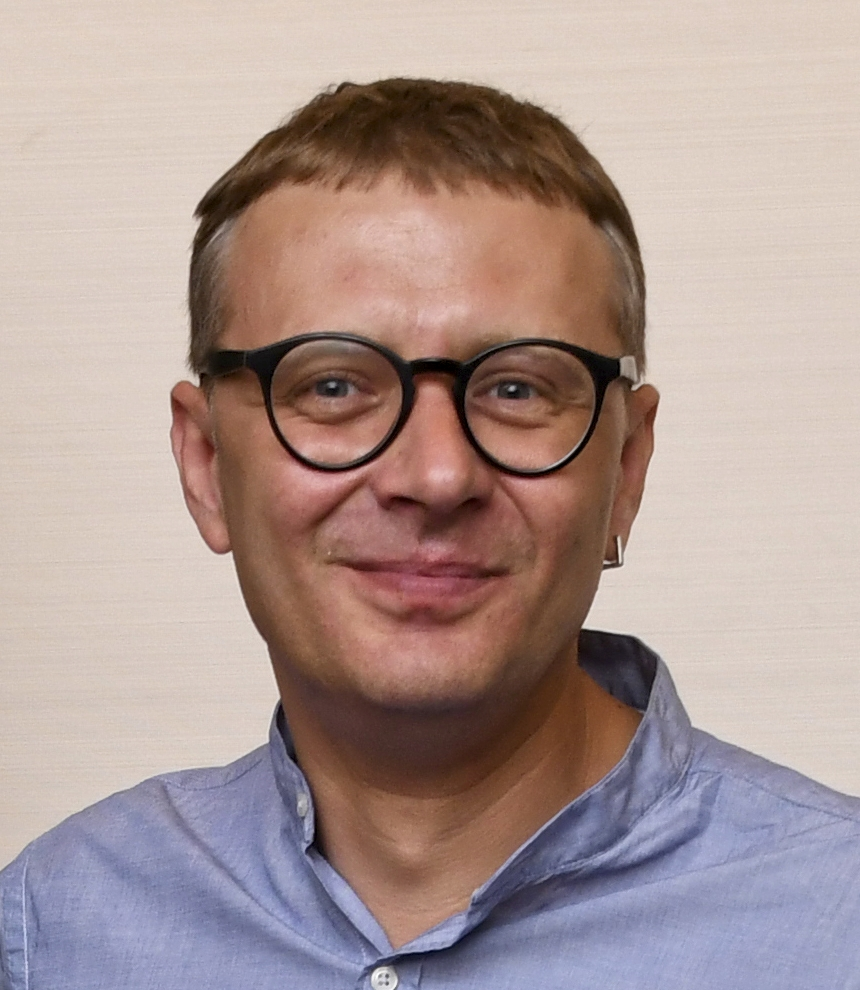
- Born: Іванов Денис Віталійович; July 22, 1978 (age 48); Kramatorsk, Donetsk region, Ukraine
- Occupations: producer; film distributor

Denis Ivanov (Ukrainian: Іванов Денис Віталійович; born July 22, 1978, Kramatorsk, Donetsk region, Ukraine) is a Ukrainian producer, film distributor, cultural manager, TV presenter, head of the Arthouse Traffic film company, member of the European Film Academy and National Union of Cinematographers of Ukraine, founder of the Odesa International Film Festival and «Children Kinofest» – International Film Festival for children and teenagers (Ukraine).

== Biography ==
Denis Ivanov was born in the city of Kramatorsk, Donetsk region. In 2000 he graduated from the Donetsk State University with a degree in Political Science. In 1996 he founded the «Alternative Cinema Club» at the Donetsk State University. In 1998-1999, he worked as a cameraman in the Donetsk Regional State TV and Radio Company. In 1999 he studied at the Islington College of London and received a master's degree in black and white photography.

== Career ==
In 2000-2001 he worked as a program coordinator of the Kyiv International Theater Festival "Mystetske Berezilla".

In 2001 he became a member of the selection committee and program coordinator of the Kyiv IFF "Molodist", in 2002 took the post of the program director, in 2003 – marketing director of the festival.

In 2003 founded "Arthouse Traffic" film company and became its CEO. Arthouse Traffic became the first Ukrainian distributor of art-cinema and the manager of film festivals. Since foundation Arthouse Traffic has distributed more than 400 films, including "Pina" by Wim Wenders, "Oceans" by Jacques Perrin, "Zatoichi" by Takeshi Kitano, "Pool" by Francois Ozon, "Return" by Andrei Zvyagintsev, "Oldboy" by Park Chan-wook, "Prophet" by Jacques Odiar, "Slumdog Millionaire" by Danny Boyle, "Dallas Buyers Club" by Jean-Marc Valle among others.

In 2006, Denis Ivanov became co-producer of the thriller "Shtolnya", dir. Lubomir Levytskyi, whose international premiere took place at the Moscow International Film Festival.

In 2010, he became the founder and general director (2010-2013) of the Odesa International Film Festival, which for the first few years became one of the largest film festivals in Eastern Europe.

Together with the director Volodymyr Tykhy, Denis Ivanov produced almanacs of short films called "Mudaky. Arabesques"(2010) and "Ukraine, goodbye"(2012). In 2013, he became a general producer of the film "The Green Jacket" directed by Volodymyr Tykhy, the world premiere of which took place at the San Sebastian film festival. The film also took part in the international competition of the Warsaw International Film Festival and won the FIPRESCI prize for the best Ukrainian feature film at the Odesa Film Festival 2014.

In December 2013, Denis Ivanov initiated the creation of the first winter film market in Kyiv, which became an annual professional event for Ukrainian cinemas, distributors, and producers.

The film "The Tribe" directed by Miroslav Slaboshpitsky (2014), which Denis Ivanov co-produced, won three prizes at Critic's Week section of the Cannes Film Festival. The film participated in more than 50 film festivals around the world, including the Locarno and Toronto and was released in more than forty countries, becoming the most successful international release of the Ukrainian film in history.

In 2014 Denis Ivanov founded «Children KinoFest» – film festival for children and teenagers . In 2017, the festival expanded to 21 cities, the number of visitors exceeded 40 thousand viewers.

In 2016, he initiated the organization of annual days of Ukrainian cinema UKRAINE ON FILM in the cultural center BOZAR in Brussels, Belgium.

The film "Black Level" by Valentin Vasianovich (2017), in which Ivanov participated as an associate producer, received the FIPRESCI prize for the best Ukrainian feature film at the Odesa Film Festival 2017 and became the Ukrainian candidate for the Oscar in the Best Foreign Language film category.

In 2017 Denis Ivanov founded annual "Kyiv Critics Week" film festival. Well-known Ukrainian film critics were invited as the curators of the film program: Daria Badior, culture editor, LB.ua; film critic Nadezhda Zavarova; the author of the publications "Ukrainian Truth" and "Ukrinform" Alexander Gusev and the director, the founder of the portal Cineticle Stanislav Bityutsky.

In 2017, Denis Ivanov became a co-producer of Sergei Loznitsa's "Donbass", which became the opening film of the Un Certain Regard at the Cannes Film Festival in 2018 and was awarded a jury prize for the best director of the program

== TV ==
In April 2014, the Ukrainian NLO channel hosted the first release of the TV program "Pro Kino na NLO", in which Denis Ivanov became a producer and a host.

== Filmography ==
As producer

Full-length features:

2006 – Shtolnya by Lubomir Levytskyi

2013 – The Green Jacket by Volodymyr Tykhy

2014 - The Tribe by Myroslav Slaboshpytskyi

2017 - Black Level by Valentyn Vasianovych

2018 – Donbass by Sergei Loznitsa

2018 – Polina by Olias Barco
