= Krishna Levy =

French composer

- Born: May 27, 1964 (age 60); New Delhi, India
- Occupation: Film score composer
- Website: http://krishnalevy.free.fr

Krishna Levy (born on May 27, 1964, in New Delhi, India) is a French film score composer. He studied music in USA but lives and works in Paris (France).

== Filmography (selection) ==
- 1995 : Fast directed by Dante Desarthe.
- 1996 : Comment je me suis disputé... (ma vie sexuelle) directed by Arnaud Desplechin.
- 1999 : Karnaval directed by Thomas Vincent.
- 2000 : Cours toujours directed by Dante Desarthe.
- 2001 : Ali Zaoua, prince de la rue directed by Nabil Ayouch.
- 2001 : Quand on sera grand directed by Renaud Cohen
- 2002 : 8 Women (8 Femmes) directed by François Ozon.
- 2004 : Je suis un assassin directed by Thomas Vincent.
- 2004 : Le Dernier Trappeur directed by Nicolas Vanier.
- 2006 : Je me fais rare directed by Dante Desarthe.
- 2006 : The Fall directed by Tarsem Singh.
- 2007 : Contre-enquête directed by Franck Mancuso.
- 2008 : Whatever Lola Wants directed by Nabil Ayouch.
- 2008 : Le Nouveau Protocole directed by Thomas Vincent.
- 2009 : Je l'aimais directed by Zabou Breitman
- 2009 : Loup directed by Nicolas Vanier.
- 2011 : 1, 2, 3, voleurs directed by Gilles Mimouni (TV)
- 2012 : Je fais feu de tout bois directed by Dante Desarthe.
- 2013 : Dancing in Jaffa directed by Hilla Medalia.

== Awards ==
- 2003 : Étoile d'or du compositeur de musique originale de films, for his score for the movie 8 Women, by François Ozon.
- 2001 : Prix "Mozart du 7ème art" at Festival d'Auxerre for Ali Zaoua, prince de la rue, by Nabil Ayouch.
