= Thierry Neuvic =

French actor

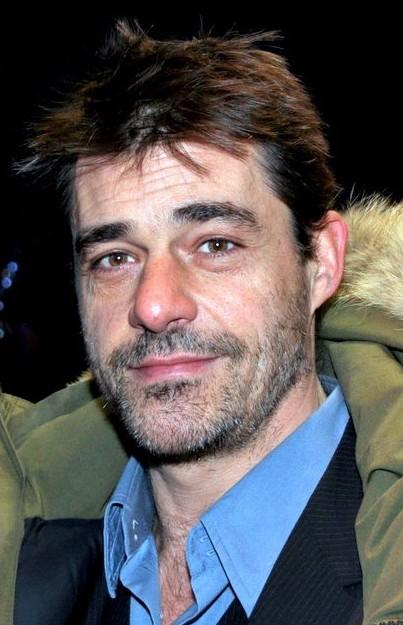
- Neuvic in 2013
- Born: 3 August 1970 (age 56); Montreuil, Seine-Saint-Denis, France
- Occupation: Actor
- Years active: 1992-present
- Children: 1

Thierry Neuvic (born 3 August 1970) is a French actor. He has appeared in more than 50 films and television shows since 1996. He starred in the film Code Unknown, which was selected in the 2000 Cannes Film Festival.

== Personal life ==
He was the companion of actress Hélène Fillières for several years until October 2011.

From 2013 to 2016, he dated Jenifer, after they met on the set of the film Les Francis. They have a son, Joseph, born August 13, 2014.

== Theatre ==
Year	Title	Author	Director
1992	Baal	Bertolt Brecht	Jean-Pierre Garnier
1992	Lulu	Frank Wedekind	Jean-Pierre Garnier
1993	État des lieux	M.P. Bellemare	M.P. Bellemare
1993	Essai sur les romantiques	Dalmay	Dalmay
1994	Jeffery	Raymond Acquaviva	Raymond Acquaviva
1994	Pour une paire de mare nostrum	Lisa Wurmser & F. Elkemenck	Lisa Wurmser & F. Elkemenck
1995	Cyrano de Bergerac	Edmond Rostand	Valérie Nègre
1995	Les grandes illusions	Valérie Nègre	Valérie Nègre
1996	La Parisienne	Henry Becque	Jean-Louis Benoît
1996	Une envie de tuer sur le bout de la langue	Xavier Durringer	Thierry de Peretti
1999-2000	The Miser	Molière	Jérôme Savary
2000-2001	Un trait de l'esprit	Margaret Edson	Jeanne Moreau

== Filmography ==
Year	Title	Role	Director	Notes
1995	Le juge est une femme	Franck Murat	Didier Albert	TV series (1 episode)
1996	La femme de la forêt	Alexandre	Arnaud Sélignac	TV mini-series
1997	Si je t'oublie Sarajevo	Fred	Arnaud Sélignac	TV movie
1997	Sud lointain	Gathelier	Thierry Chabert	TV mini-series
1998	Les insoumis	Mat Prades	Gérard Marx	TV movie
1998	Louise et les marchés	Philippe	Marc Rivière	TV mini-series
1998	Vertiges	Charlie	Miguel Courtois	TV series (1 episode)
2000	Code Unknown	Georges	Michael Haneke	
2001	God Is Great and I'm Not	The first patient	Pascale Bailly	
2001	Mausolée pour une garce	Hervé Vosges	Arnaud Sélignac	TV movie
2001	Tel père, telle flic	Stéphane Salevain	Eric Woreth	TV series (1 episode)
2002	Génération start-up	Jean-Phil	Arnaud Sélignac	TV movie
2004	Le Miroir de l'eau	Robin Lary	Edwin Baily	TV mini-series
2004	Clara et associés	Mathieu Pages	Gérard Marx	TV series (1 episode)
2004	Josephine, Guardian Angel	Camille Flaubert	Patrick Malakian	TV series (1 episode)
2005	Tout pour plaire	Julien	Cécile Telerman	
2005	Brasier	Benjamin	Arnaud Sélignac	TV movie
2005	La bonne copine	Antoine	Nicolas Cuche	TV movie
2005	Fargas		Christophe Douchand	TV series (1 episode)
2005	Le juge est une femme	Éric Armandin	Christian Bonnet	TV series (1 episode)
2005	Clara Sheller	Gilles	Renaud Bertrand	TV series (6 episodes)
2006	Tell No One	Marc Bertaud	Guillaume Canet	
2006	Hey Good Looking !	Michel	Lisa Azuelos	
2006	Alerte à Paris!	Alex Cirelli	Charlotte Brandström	TV movie
2006	Petits secrets et gros mensonges	Max Ronsac	Laurence Katrian	TV movie
2006-12	Mafiosa	Jean-Michel Paoli	Hugues Pagan, Éric Rochant, ...	TV series (25 episodes)
2007	Autopsy	Emmanuel Rivière	Jérôme Anger	TV movie
2007	Un admirateur secret	Yann Russeil	Christian Bonnet	TV movie
2007	La promeneuse d'oiseaux	Gaudion	Jacques Otmezguine	TV movie
2007	Sécurité intérieure	Laura's lover	Patrick Grandperret	TV mini-series
2007	La légende des 3 clefs	Captain Mathieu Di Maggio	Patrick Dewolf	TV mini-series
2008	Stella	Yvon	Sylvie Verheyde	
2008	Love Is Dead	Mathias	Éric Capitaine	Short
2009	Don't Look Back	Teo 2	Marina de Van	
2009	Oscar and the Lady in Pink	Victor	Éric-Emmanuel Schmitt	
2009	L'évasion	André	Laurence Katrian	TV movie
2010	Hereafter	Didier	Clint Eastwood	
2010	Love Like Poison	Paul Falguères	Katell Quillévéré	
2010	Domino(S)	Franck	Charles Poupot	Short
2010	L'amour vache	Luc	Christophe Douchand	TV movie
2010	Le cose che restano	Michel	Gianluca Maria Tavarelli	TV mini-series
2011	Derrière les murs	Philippe	Julien Lacombe & Pascal Sid	
2011	Sherlock Holmes: A Game of Shadows	Claude Ravache	Guy Ritchie	
2011	Ter-Ter	Martinez	Fabien Carrabin & David Lucchini	Short
2011	L'angle mort	Paul	Florence Benoist	Short
2011	Ni vu, ni connu	Lino Vars	Christophe Douchand	TV movie
2011	Tout le monde descend	Pierre-Alain Kessler	Renaud Bertrand	TV movie
2011	L'amour encore plus vache	Luc	Christophe Douchand	TV movie
2012	Les papas du dimanche	Antoine Le Forestier	Louis Becker	
2013	The Scapegoat	Inspector Carrega	Nicolas Bary	
2013	Silences d'État	Nicolas Malisewski	Frédéric Berthe	TV movie
2014	SK1	Jensen	Frédéric Tellier	
2014	Les Francis	Dumé Campana	Fabrice Begotti	
2014	Tu es si jolie ce soir	Joe	Jean-Pierre Mocky	
2014	Ligne de mire	David	Nicolas Herdt	TV movie
2015	The Squad	Becker	Benjamin Rocher	
2015	Belle & Sebastian: The Adventure Continues	Pierre	Christian Duguay	
2016	We Are Family	Philippe	Gabriel Julien-Laferrière	
2016	Premier jour	Serge	Yohann Charrin	Short
2017	Juste un regard	Bastien Beaufils	Ludovic Colbeau-Justin	TV mini-series
2018	Belle and Sebastien: Friends for Life	Pierre	Clovis Cornillac	
2018	Piégés	Marc	Ludovic Colbeau-Justin	TV movie
2018	Illégitime	Stéphane	Renaud Bertrand	TV movie Luchon International Film Festival - Best Actor
2019	C'est quoi cette mamie ?	Philippe	Gabriel Julien-Laferrière	
2019	La Malédiction de Provins	Patrick Robin	Olivier Doran	TV movie
2019	Coup de foudre à Saint-Pétersbourg	Vania Belinsky	Christophe Douchand	TV movie
2019-20	Une belle histoire	Éric	Nadège Loiseau & Marie-Hélène Copti	TV series (5 episodes)
2021	C'est quoi ce papy?!	Philippe	Gabriel Julien-Laferrière	
2021	J'ai menti	Joseph Layrac	Frédéric Berthe	TV mini-series
2021	Sam	Laurent	Philippe Lefebvre	TV series (8 episodes)
2022	Stella est amoureuse	Yvon	Sylvie Verheyde	
2022	L'impasse	Thomas Cassagne	Delphine Lemoine	TV movie
2022	Le Mystère Daval	Inspector Dacosta	Christophe Lamotte	TV movie
2022	La Maison d'en face	Stephane	Lionel Bailliu	TV mini-series
2022	Le Remplaçant	Stéphane Lacroix	Julien Seri	TV series (2 episodes)
2023	Infiltré(e)	Max	Jean-Philippe Amar	TV mini-series

== Award ==
- Festival de Luchon 2019 : Best actor for Illégitime
