= Hugueninia =

Hugueninia is the scientific name of two genera of organisms and may refer to:

- Hugueninia (plant), a genus of plants in the family Brassicaceae
- Hugueninia (fungus), genus of fungi in the family Microthyriaceae
