= The Last Trapper =

- Directed by: Nicolas Vanier
- Written by: Nicolas Vanier
- Produced by: Jean-Pierre Bailly
- Starring: Norman Winther; May Loo; Alex Van Bibber; Ken Bolton; Denny Denison
- Cinematography: Thierry Machado
- Edited by: Yves Chaput
- Music by: Krishna Levy
- Distributed by: TFM Distribution
- Release date: 5 January 2006
- Running time: 94 minutes
- Country: France
- Language: French

The Last Trapper (French: Le Dernier Trappeur) is a 2006 French documentary film directed by Nicolas Vanier. It follows a trapper in Yukon, Canada.

== Synopsis ==
In the heart of the Rocky Mountains of the Canadian Yukon, in the depths of the high altitude, Norman is a musher trapper who lives in the most solitary, traditional way possible, with Nebraska, a Nahanni Native American, her two horses and her seven hitching dogs. Husky. He gives himself the role of monitoring nature and regulating species.

Disconnected from the desires created by modern society, they feed on the products of hunting and fishing. Norman lives in self-sufficiency and makes his own huts, snowshoes, sled, canoe and all he needs with the wood and bark taken from the forest, and Nebraska tanned the old-fashioned leather.

Once a year, in the spring, Norman makes a trip to the nearest cities of Whitehorse or Dawson City to sell about 150 skins and furs of lynx, beavers, martens, otters, wolves, foxes, caribou, elk ... and buy the little he needs: flour, matches, candles, tobacco, batteries for his transistor, tools, medicine, shotgun and ammunition.
