= Margaux Châtelier =

French actress

- Born: 21 March 1990 (age 36)
- Occupation: Actress
- Years active: 2006–present

Margaux Châtelier (born 21 March 1990) is a French actress known for her role in the 2013 film Belle and Sebastian and its 2015 sequel, Belle & Sebastian: The Adventure Continues. She appeared as Annalise de Marillac in the Starz series Outlander in 2016.

== Filmography ==
Year	Project	Role	Notes	Ref.
2006	Aurore	Aurore	Film	
2009	Commissaire Magellan	Laura	TV series/Episode: "Roman noir" (pilot)	
2010	Julie Lescaut	Chloé Feuillant	TV series/Episode: "Rédemption"	
2010	Profilage	Héloïse Bastien	TV series/Episode: "Renaissance"	
2012	Paris Manhattan	Laura	Film	
2012	La Baie d'Alger	Michelle	TV movie	
2013	Belle and Sebastian	Angélina	Film	
2013	Tenderness	Alison	Film	
2015	Belle & Sebastian: The Adventure Continues	Angélina	Film	
2016	Outlander	Annalise de Marillac	TV series	
2018	Belle and Sebastien: Friends for Life	Angélina		
2020	De Gaulle, l'éclat et le secret	Elisabeth de Gaulle	TV Mini Series	
2023	Drops of God	Young Marianne Léger	TV Series, 2 episodes	
