= European Film Academy =

Organization promoting European film culture

- Formation: 1989; 37 years ago
- Founder: Ingmar Bergman
- Type: Trade association
- Legal status: e.V.
- Purpose: To advance the interests of the European film industry.
- Headquarters: Berlin, Germany
- Location(s): Stralauer Allee 2A; 10245 Berlin, Germany
- Members: 5,300 (2024)
- President: Juliette Binoche (since 2024)
- Website: www.europeanfilmacademy.org

The European Film Academy is a non-profit association promoting the interests of the European film industry.

The European Film Academy honors films and filmmakers annually with the European Film Awards. The ceremony takes place in various European cities every even year and in Berlin every odd year.

== History ==
The European Film Academy was formed by a group of European filmmakers who came together in Berlin on the occasion of the first presentation of the European Film Awards in November 1988.

The European Film Academy was founded in 1989 under the name "European Cinema Society" by Swedish director Ingmar Bergman, along with forty other filmmakers from across Europe, including Bernardo Bertolucci, Claude Chabrol, Dušan Makavejev, István Szabó, and Wim Wenders. Bergman served as the first president, and Wenders was appointed chairman.

In 1990, the organization was renamed the European Film Academy and registered as a non-profit association.

In 1996, Wim Wenders succeeded Bergman as president, and Nik Powell, a British producer, was elected chairman.

Mike Downey, an Irish-British film producer, was elected chairman in 2020.

In 2021, Polish filmmaker Agnieszka Holland became the first woman to serve as president of the Academy. That same year, the Academy discontinued use of the abbreviation "EFA" and began referring to itself either by its full name or simply as "the Academy." A new logo was introduced in August 2021, designed by the Polish agency Huncwot, as part of a broader update to its digital and visual identity.

In May 2024, French actress Juliette Binoche was elected president, succeeding Holland.

== Organization ==
=== Board ===
The board of the academy consists of members representing various parts of Europe. Board members are elected for a 2 year term, with a limit of 3 terms. Beginning in 2024, each of the 15 organization's board members were selected from 15 distinct geographical or linguistic regions in Europe, each comprising different countries. In addition, a board seat has been set aside for a transnational ethnic representative from either the Sámi or Roma populations in Europe.

Board meetings take place 3 times a year, one of which is held in Berlin, where the academy is headquartered.

- President: Juliette Binoche (since 2024)
- Chair of the board: Mike Downey (since 2020)
- CEO and director: Matthijs Wouter Knol (since 2021)
- Deputy chairs: Ada Solomon, Joanna Szymańska
- Current members of the board: Bettina Brokemper, Başak Emre, Daniel Hočevar, Nina Hoss, Denis Ivanov, Giorgos Karnavas, Hanka Kastelicová, Tine Klint, Paz Lázaro Barquilla, Christophe Leparc, Leontine Petit, Marija Razgutė, Maria Nevina Satta, Jim Sheridan, Mira Staleva, Anne-Lajla Utsi.
- Honorary members of the board: Sir Ben Kingsley, István Szabó
- Former honorary members of the board: Dušan Makavejev, Jeanne Moreau

=== Members per country ===
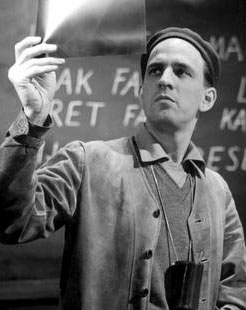
Ingmar Bergman, the academy's first president from 1988 to 1996

Based on a decision of the general assembly, the number of members, limited initially to 99, has been allowed to expand. The academy invites new members once per year. As of 1 January 2025, membership has 5,383.

- Germany 906
- Italy 417
- UK 348
- France 304
- Spain 275
- Switzerland 270
- Poland 236
- Netherlands 200
- Sweden 183
- Denmark 179
- Greece 157
- Austria 131
- Ukraine 125
- Belgium 104
- Finland 102
- Norway 100
- Czech Republic 99
- Romania 97
- Turkey 84
- Israel 78
- Hungary 77
- Russia 77
- Iceland 74
- Ireland 74
- Serbia 67
- Croatia 62
- Bulgaria 60
- Slovenia 59
- Lithuania 43
- Portugal 42
- Slovakia 39
- Estonia 32
- Bosnia and Herzegovina 29
- Luxembourg 29
- Kosovo 26
- Latvia 25
- Cyprus 23
- Georgia 23
- North Macedonia 18
- Azerbaijan 18
- United States 16
- Montenegro 13
- Albania 11
- Greenland 10
- Armenia 9
- Malta 7
- Belarus 6
- Moldova 5
- Palestinian Territories 5
- Kazakhstan 3
- Kyrgyzstan 1
- Australia 1
- Canada 1
- Hong Kong 1

Listed are all countries with more than 20 European Film Academy members. The European Film Academy is active and has members in 52 countries, including those in geographical Europe as well as Israel and Palestine.

=== Funding ===
The European Film Academy is mainly funded by the Stiftung Deutsche Klassenlotterie Berlin (German National Lottery), the German State Minister for Culture and the Media, and Medienboard Berlin-Brandenburg. The presentation of the European Film Awards is financed independently from the Academy. Founded in 2006 to produce the European Film Awards ceremony for television, European Film Academy Productions (formerly EFA Productions) gGmbH is the in-house production team and is a subsidiary company of the European Film Academy e.V. The European Film Awards are supported by patrons from the international film industry, including national organizations such as the British Film Institute, the Danish Film Institute, EURIMAGES, and the Swedish Film Institute.

=== Presidents ===
Presidents of the European Film Academy
Photo	Name and Surname	Country	Mandate
	Ingmar Bergman	Sweden	1988–1996
	Wim Wenders	Germany	1996–2020
	Agnieszka Holland	Poland	2020–2024
	Juliette Binoche	France	2024–present

== Annual academy programme ==
Throughout the year, the European Film Academy initiates and participates in a series of activities dealing with film politics as well as economic, artistic, and training aspects. The program includes conferences, seminars, and workshops, with a common goal is to build a bridge between creativity and the industry. Some of the academy's events have become an institution for meetups within the European film community. Some of these events are:

The Short Film Initiative
An initiative by the European Film Academy in co-operation with fifteen festivals throughout Europe. At each of these festivals, an independent jury presents one of the European short films in competition with a nomination in the short film category of the European Film Awards.

A Sunday in the Country
A special weekend encounter between approximately 10 young European filmmakers and some established European Film Academy members. The private atmosphere of these gatherings guarantees an exchange of ideas and experience which goes far beyond the results of usual workshops.

Conferences and Seminars
A series of conferences initiated and/or supported by the European Film Academy to discuss what European film is, how it is changing, and where it is going.

Master Classes
These classes offer training opportunities for young talent, combining theoretical and practical training. The high-profile list of former masters includes film professionals such as Jean-Jacques Annaud, Jan De Bont, Henning Carlsen, André Delvaux, Bernd Eichinger, Krzysztof Kieślowski, Jiří Menzel, Tilda Swinton, István Szabó, Marc Weigert, Mike Newell, Tsui Hark, Allan Starski and Anthony Dod Mantle.

== European Film Awards ==
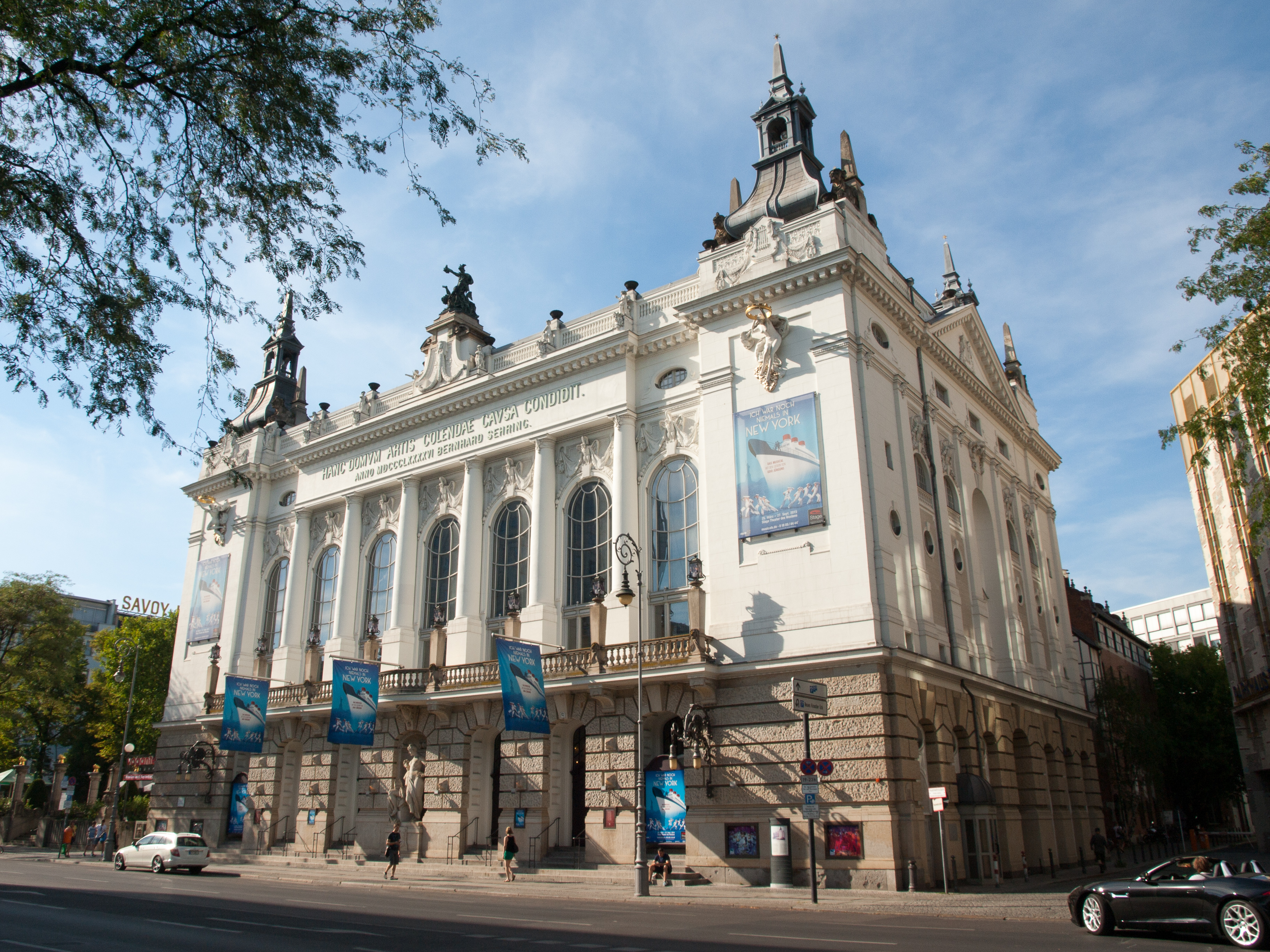
The Theater des Westens in Berlin was the first venue of the European Film Awards in 1988

The annual European Film Awards ceremony (known as FELIX until 1997) is the most high-profile activity of the European Film Academy. The academy pursues the following aims with the awards: attracting the interest of the audience in European cinema, promoting its cultural and artistic qualities, and regaining the public's confidence in its entertainment value. To put these ideas into practice, the People's Choice Award was added as a new category in 1997. As of 2020, the People's Choice Award merged with the Lux Award of the European Parliament into the joint initiative LUX Audience Award. The nominees for the LUX Audience Award are announced during the ceremony of the European Film Awards. After this, screenings of the nominated films are organised for the public in several European cities.

The members of the European Film Academy actively participate in the selection, nomination and awarding procedures for the European Film Awards.

Taking place in the second weekend of December, the European Film Awards are the first in the international awards season. Most of the nominees and winners of the European Film Awards are found in the following months among the nominees and winners of the Golden Globes or the Oscars. In the past years, European producers and distributors repeatedly stressed that a nomination for or win at the European Film Awards had a positive impact on the chances for their films to win further international awards, such as a Golden Globe or an Oscar.

=== Sidebar events ===
Throughout the year, the academy organizes a side program on the occasion of the European Film Awards. Originally, this was a weekend with panel discussions and conferences in the city where the Awards ceremony would take place. At these events, production methods for the new millennium were discussed at the conference (Berlin 1999), or European filmmakers of international reputation (among them, Wim Wenders, Liv Ullmann, Tom Tykwer, Dominik Moll, Pavel Lungin, Maria de Medeiros) as well as the then EU commissioner Viviane Reding made very personal and visionary speeches on the artistic, cultural, and social role of cinema in front of 800 guests at Theâtre de l'Odéon in Paris, where the conference "E LA NAVE VA - For a New Energy in European Cinema" was held (2000). Significant changes to the annual program were introduced in 2021.

=== Month of European Film ===
As of 2022, the European Film Academy organizes an annual "Month of European Film". This program highlights European films in the month prior to the European Film Awards, both in European cinemas, on television, as well as in cooperation with streaming platforms. A pilot edition of the Month of European Film took place in Berlin in 2021. The first official edition of the Month of European Film was launched in November 2022 at the Seville European Film Festival and took place simultaneously in a range of European cities.
