= Children KinoFest =

International film festival for children

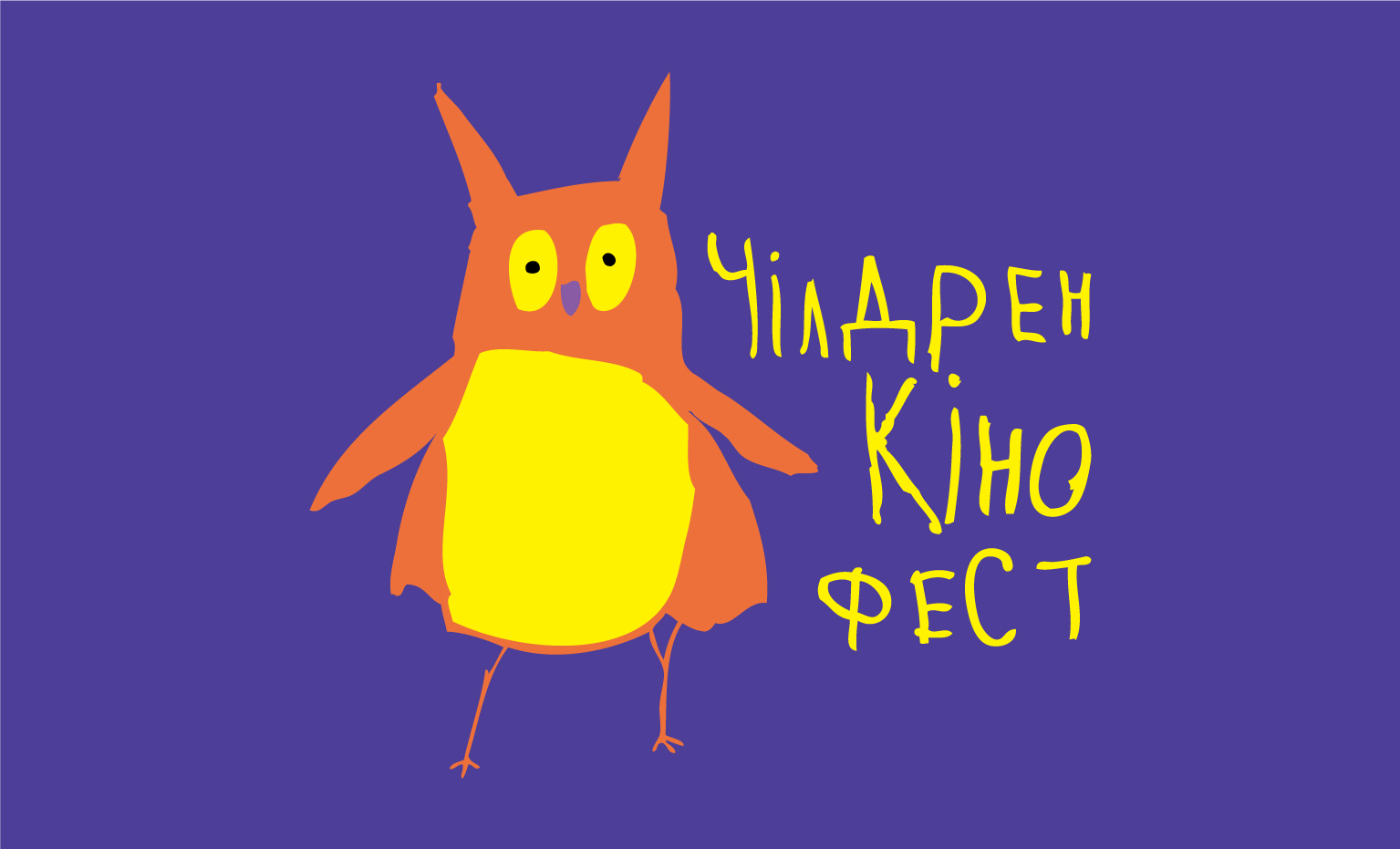
Children's Film Festival’s flag

Children KinoFest (Ukrainian: Чілдрен Кінофест) is an annual international film festival for children and teenagers, founded in Kyiv, Ukraine in 2014. The festival takes place at the end of May and is held in various Ukrainian cities. This national event, held throughout the country (18 cities in Ukraine) cultivates an appreciation of film and an introduction to the filmmaking industry to the young public. Owlet Charlie is a logo, mascot, and symbol of Children KinoFest. This character is based on a picture created by 7-year-old Artem Rassadnikov from Donetsk. Charlie is named after Charlie Chaplin, whose 125th birthday was in 2014. The event has recently partnered with Odesa International Film Festival, also based in Ukraine.

== History ==
3rd edition of Children KinoFest took place from May 27 to June 5, 2016, was attended by more than 30,000 visitors and was held in 18 Ukrainian cities. Among the young guests of the festival, were the victims of the conflict in eastern Ukraine, children with special needs and orphans. Many of them visited a cinema for the first time and had an opportunity to see a film on the big screen. The international competition was attended by 7 European movies. Retrospective of cartoons by the animation studio "Aardman" and the animation series My country – Ukraine were shown out of competition. An ambassador of Children KinoFest 2016 was an actor, director and broadcaster Akhtem Seitablayev.

The event is supported by the EU Delegation to Ukraine, the State Agency of Ukraine for movie, Goethe-Istitut in Ukraine, the French Institute in Ukraine, the Embassy of Sweden in Ukraine, the Embassy of Norway in Ukraine, the Embassy of Switzerland in Ukraine, the Embassy of Denmark in Ukraine, Danish Film Institute. Organizers – "Arthouse Traffic".

4th Children KnoFest takes place from May 27 to June 4, 2017 in 21 City of Ukraine: Vinnytsia, Dnipro, Zhytomyr, Ivano-Frankivsk, Kyiv, Kramatorsk, Kryvyi Rih, Lutsk, Lviv, Mariupol, Odesa, Poltava, Sievierodonetsk, Sloviansk, Sumy, Ternopil, Kharkiv, Kherson, Khmelnytskyi, Cherkasy, Chernihiv. Impressions visited more than forty thousand young Ukrainians. An honorary ambassador of the cinema was one of the most famous Ukrainian writers, columnist, scriptwriter and playwright Katerina Babkina.

At the opening ceremony on May 26, in the festival center in the Kyivska Rus cinema with an interactive light show for the first time in Ukraine, the Dutch Art group “PIPS: Lab” was performed, which creates performances by lighting, video and music.

=== Competition program ===
“I love you, mom” (Latvia, dir. Janis Norris), “The boy in the golden pants” (Sweden-Denmark, dir: Ella Lemhagen), “Little Monster” (Switzerland-Germany-Sweden, dir: Matthias Brun, Mikael Ekblad, Ted Seeger), “Go to school!” (Denmark, dir: Frederick Meldal Nyorgor), “Life of a Squash” (Switzerland-France, dir.: Claude Barras), “Molly Moon and the Magic Hypnosis Textbook” (UK, dir: Christopher N. Rowley), “Nikita Kozhumyak” (Ukraine, dir: Manuk Depoyan).

== Programme ==
The program's sections are as follows:

- International Competition: 7 feature films from different countries for viewers older who are 10 years or older
- Retrospective dedicated to the great cinematographers (CHKF-2014 featured Charlie Chaplin's short films, CHKF-2015 – three short masperpieses by Buster Keaton)
- Short films selections for children 3 to 10 years of age
- Interactive museum of optical amusements for kids and grown-ups

== Awards ==
Best film 2016 – Mancs (Robert-Adrian Pejo, Hungary, 2015)
Best film 2015 – Felix (Roberta Durrant, South Africa, 2013)
Best film 2014 – Belle et Sébastien (Nicolas Vanier, France, 2013)
