= Le Miroir de l'eau =

French mini-series

Le Miroir de l'eau (The Mirror of Water) was a French mini-series directed by Edwin Baily and consisting of four episodes of one-hundred minutes each. It was first broadcast between 9 and 30 August 2004 on France 2.

== Synopsis ==
Antoine Marange returns to his home near Aix-en-Provence after sailing around the world, only to learn that the girl he had loved twenty-five years earlier, Isaure Castella, has drowned in the lake "Waters Mirrors". Her drowning was suspicious and Antoine's return unveils a lot of mysteries.

For some time, Gabrielle, Isaure's younger sister, has had the feeling that the latter's back. It started with the reopening of her bedroom that her mother had locked in order not to awaken the past. Additionally, Alice, Alexandra's daughter, has visions and regularly sees Isaure in "Water Mirrors". Alexandra is the mistress of both Nicolas and Robin. This latter is a police inspector whose relationship with Alexandra is rather strained. Fortunately, he meets Anna, Alice's schoolteacher, who is actually about to marry, but is confused and in search of her identity.

To make matters worse, Antoine's teenaged niece, Anais, drowns in the same circonstances as Isaure. The inspector Robin is in charge of the inquiry, and the investigation will unveil secrets that had been buried with great care by the grandmother of the family, Suzanne Castella.

== Cast ==
- Line Renaud as Suzanne Castella
- Christiana Reali as Gabrielle Castella-Aubry
- Clémentine Célarié as Josépha Beaulieu
- Bernard Yerlès as Antoine Marange
- Clio Baran as Elena Aubry
- Jean-Claude Adelin as Nicolas Aubry
- Thierry Neuvic as Robin Lary
- Gaëla Le Devehat as Anna Fauve
- Didier Bienaimé as Paul Marange
- Valérie Mairesse as Jeanne Marange
- Caroline Baehr as Alexandra
- Gabrielle Vallières as Alice
- Milan Argaud as Raphaël Marange
- Jean-Marie Juan as Emmanuel
- François Caron as Mathieu Beaulieu
- Malcolm Conrath as Guillaume Chardin
- Lizzie Brocheré as Anaïs Marange
- Julien Bravo as Yann
- Karina Testa as Isaure Castella
