= Belle et Sébastien =

1965 novel by Cécile Aubry

Belle and Sébastien
- First edition
- Author: Cécile Aubry
- Original title: Belle et Sébastien
- Illustrator: Jean Reschofsky
- Language: French
- Genre: Children's literature
- Publisher: Hachette
- Publication date: 1965
- Publication place: France
- Pages: 184

Belle et Sébastien is a 1965 novel by Cécile Aubry about a six-year-old boy named Sébastien and his dog Belle, a Great Pyrenees, who live in a village in the French Alps close to the Italian border. Sébastien lives with his adopted grandfather, sister, and brother, as his mother, a Romani, died after giving birth to him while trying to cross the border on Saint Sebastian's day. The novel, known in English-speaking countries as Belle and Sebastian, was adapted by Aubry in the same year as its publication into a French live action television series. The novel itself spawned a book series, a Japanese anime adaptation in 1981, a French motion picture in 2013, followed by two sequels in 2015 and 2017 (Belle and Sebastian: Friends for Life), and a French-Canadian co-produced TV series in 2017.

== Plot ==
Sébastien is the son of an unknown woman who died in the mountains on Saint Sebastian’s Day. He is taken in by the elderly César and his granddaughter Angelina. On the same day, the dog Belle is born on a farm and is repeatedly sold before ending up alone in the mountains. Sébastien tries to stop the villagers from killing the large dog. Angelina secretly loves Doctor Guillaume, and her brother Jean works at the dam. With César’s help, Sébastien eventually takes Belle in. Thanks to Belle, Sébastien is saved during an avalanche. In the end, Sébastien remains with his dog, and Angelina marries the doctor.

== Sequels ==
Between 1966 and 1977, Aubry wrote six more sequel novels. Moreover, from 1966, the original novel was republished within the series under the title Belle et Sébastien: Le Refuge du grand Baou. The list below follows the chronological order of the stories rather than the order of their publication.

- Belle et Sébastien: Le Document secret (1966)
- Sébastien parmi les hommes (1968)
- Séverine, Belle et Sébastien: La Rencontre (1977)
- Séverine, Belle et Sébastien: Le Collier bleu (1977)
- Sébastien et la Mary-Morgane (1969, also published in two volumes: Le Capitaine Louis Maréchal and Le retour du Narval)
- Un été pour Sébastien (1972)

== Adaptations ==
=== Belle et Sébastien (1965–1970) ===
The novel was filmed in France as live action in black and white. The BBC dubbed it into English, and anglicized the title to "Belle and Sebastian", and it became a favourite on children's television, shown a few times. The serial spawned two further 13-part colour film sequels: Sebastien parmi les Hommes (Sebastien Among Men, 1968), retitled Belle, Sebastian and the Horses by the BBC and Sebastien et la Mary-Morgane (Sebastian and the Mary Morgan) (1970); this second sequel was not broadcast by the BBC.

The Scottish indie pop band Belle & Sebastian took their name from the TV series.

=== Meiken Jolie (1981) ===
The anime version, released initially under its Japanese name of Meiken Jolie, was created in 1980, a joint production of MK Company, Visual 80 Productions and Toho Company, Ltd., with animation director Toshiyuki Kashiwakura helming the project and character designs from Shuichi Seki. The show was broadcast on French, Italian and Japanese television in 1981, with American cable network Nickelodeon picking it up in 1984.

=== Belle et Sébastien (2013 motion picture) ===
In 2013 the novel was filmed again by director Nicolas Vanier (original title: Belle et Sébastien) targeting a family audience, but placing it at the French–Swiss border Haute-Maurienne–Vanoise in 1943 and adding a storyline about fugitives crossing the mountains to the child-friendly boy-befriends-dog story.

=== Belle et Sébastien: l'aventure continue (2015 motion picture) ===
A sequel to the 2013 film (original title: Belle et Sébastien: l'aventure continue), set in 1945 and directed by Canadian director Christian Duguay, was released on December 9, 2015.

=== Belle et Sébastien (2017) ===
A production by Gaumont Animation, shown on Knowledge, in British Columbia.
