= Someone I Loved =

- Theatrical release poster
- Directed by: Zabou Breitman
- Written by: Zabou Breitman, Agnès De Sacy
- Produced by: Fabio Conversi
- Starring: Daniel Auteuil; Marie-Josée Croze
- Cinematography: Michel Amathieu
- Edited by: Françoise Bernard
- Music by: Krishna Levy
- Distributed by: SND Films
- Release date: 6 May 2009
- Running time: 113 minutes
- Country: France
- Language: French
- Budget: $11.2 million
- Box office: $6.8 million

Someone I Loved (French: Je l'aimais) is a 2009 French drama film directed by Zabou Breitman.

== Cast ==
- Daniel Auteuil - Pierre
- Marie-Josée Croze - Mathilde
- Florence Loiret Caille - Chloé
- Christiane Millet - Suzanne Houdard
- Geneviève Mnich - Geneviève, the secretary
