= Belle and Sebastian (film) =

2013 French adventure drama film

- Theatrical release poster
- Directed by: Nicolas Vanier
- Written by: Juliette Sales; Fabien Suarez; Nicolas Vanier
- Based on: Belle et Sébastien by Cécile Aubry
- Produced by: Frédéric Brillion; Gilles Legrand; Clément Miserez; Matthieu Warter
- Starring: Félix Bossuet; Tchéky Karyo; Margaux Châtelier
- Cinematography: Éric Guichard
- Edited by: Stéphanie Pedelacq; Raphaele Urtin
- Music by: Armand Amar
- Production companies: Radar Films; Epithète Films; Gaumont; M6 Films; Rhône-Alpes Cinéma
- Distributed by: Gaumont
- Release date: 18 December 2013
- Running time: 104 minutes
- Country: France
- Languages: French; German
- Budget: $11.3 million
- Box office: $35.8 million

Belle and Sebastian (French: Belle et Sébastien) is a 2013 French adventure drama film directed by Nicolas Vanier. It was based on the 1966 French novel Belle et Sébastien by Cécile Aubry, which in turn was based on the 1965 French TV series. The film was the first of a trilogy, as the second film adventure Belle & Sebastian: The Adventure Continues, was released on 9 December 2015, with the final film being Belle and Sebastien: Friends for Life, released in 2018.

== Plot ==
In 1943, in the French Alps, Sébastien is a seven year old orphan living with César, an adoptive "grandfather" and his niece, Angélina. The family lives in the village of Saint-Martin, whose inhabitants, despite the German occupation, secretly organize the passage of Jewish exiles into Switzerland. The village is also plagued by a "Beast" who preys on the local animals, including César's.

Sébastien believes that his mother migrated "to America, just over the mountains", and spends his days in the mountains. One day, returning home, he meets the "Beast", a female livestock guardian dog. Sébastien cleans her and names her "Belle". Sébastien decides to keep his new friendship with Belle a secret to protect her.

Meanwhile, a German patrol, commanded by Lieutenant Peter Braun, arrives in Saint-Martin to put an end to the secret escape route of the Jews. Sébastien, during one of his trips with Belle, collides with two soldiers; Belle responds by attacking one of them. Lieutenant Braun orders the mayor of Saint-Martin to arrange a hunt to track down and kill the "Beast". Meanwhile, César discovers Sébastien's secret and is horrified. Knowing that Sébastien will try to prevent Belle from being shot, César gives him the wrong directions to the hunting area. With Sébastien out of the area, César and the village men go after Belle and hurt her. Sébastien escapes confinement, finds the wounded dog and tries to help her. Angry with César, he goes to Guillaume, the village doctor and Angélina's boyfriend. He agrees to treat Belle and saves her life.

Unbeknownst to Sébastien, Dr. Guillaume is also the one escorting the Jews to the Swiss border. One evening, the doctor hides a family in a cave prior to a trip to the border. The doctor then goes out as a pack of wolves is near. Guillaume slips and falls as Belle appears and drives off the wolves. However, the doctor's ankle is broken, and he cannot walk. He lies down on a nearby sled, and starts pawing his way to town when Belle picks up the rope, and begins to tow him. She takes him to Angélina's house, where César apologizes to Sébastien for wanting to kill Belle.

Guillaume, who is now injured, can no longer lead the Jews, and his place is taken by Angélina. Sébastien follows her and sneaks into the cave. He befriends Esther, the refugee family's daughter, and by talking with her, he discovers that César lied to him about where America truly is. That evening, Sébastien sneaks into his schoolhouse to look at a map. There, César discovers Sébastien and reveals the truth: his mother died while giving birth to him. César was present by chance and agreed to take care of Sébastien; he lied to protect him. Sébastien now knows he can count on César and makes peace with him. It is Christmas Eve, and César gives him a gift: a pocket watch with a compass.

Meanwhile, the Germans realize that some Jews might try to escape on Christmas Day, and begin to scour the mountains. Angélina and the Jews leave the cave, but are spotted by Lieutenant Braun. He shouts at Angélina, who herds the family faster up a mountain. However, all of them are eventually overwhelmed by an avalanche caused by Braun's shouts. Lt. Braun, when dug out of the snow, warns her to take another route to reach the border because his soldiers are patrolling the mountain.

Sébastien boasts that Belle, thanks to her sense of smell, will guide them. The group escapes from the Germans and brings the Jews to Switzerland, where they are greeted by a local guide. Angélina then reveals that she will go on to England to help win the war. She promises to return once it is all over, leaving Belle and Sébastien to walk back home alone. The guide asks if she is sure that Sébastien can make such a journey on his own. Angélina replies that he is not alone.

== Cast ==
- Félix Bossuet as Sébastien
- Tchéky Karyo as César
- Margaux Châtelier as Angélina
- Dimitri Storoge as Docteur Guillaume
- Andreas Pietschmann as Lieutenant Peter Braun
- Urbain Cancelier as The Mayor
- Mehdi El Glaoui as André
- Andrée Damant as Célestine
- ElsPaloma Palma as Esther
- Karine Adrover as Esther's Mother
- Loïc Varrautn as Esther's Father
- Jan Oliver Scihroeder as Soldier Hans
- Tom Sommerlatgte as Soldier Erich
- Pasquale D'Incga as The Butcher
- Eric Soubelet as Fabien

== Production ==
In less than a week in Italy, "Belle and Sebastian" was the most-popular film at the box office, grossing €4.5 million. The facts narrated in the film are taken from the stories of French writer Cécile Aubry, who were then transported to the small screen as the 1960s television series of the 1960s. In the 1980s, "Belle and Sebastian" was adapted into a long series of Japanese cartoons, of which the film's director, Nicolas Vanier, was an avid fan: "As a child I was completely crazy in the TV series Belle and Sebastian, which is why, when I was offered this project, I was very intimidated! For me it was not a corny TV series, but a long series of episodes of one more beautiful 'other. Accept to make a film adaptation was a big challenge. When I was contacted by the production, suddenly everything I had tried watching Belle and Sébastien had awakened and felt compelled to make this film the best".

Félix Bossuet, the boy who plays the main role, was chosen from more than 2,400 children from the same director candidates because of a "lightning strike" as stated by Vanier.

Mehdi El Glaoui, the son of Cécile Aubry, who played Sebastian in the TV series of the same name in the 1960s, has a small role in the film as André.

== Awards ==
"Belle and Sebastian" was awarded Best Film in 2014 at the Children KinoFest, an international film festival in Ukraine.

== Sequel ==
A sequel, Belle & Sebastian: The Adventure Continues, directed by Christian Duguay, and reuniting screenwriters Sales and Suarez as well as cast members Bossuet, Karyo, Chatelier and Cancelier, was released in December 2015.
