= Belle and Sebastian (Japanese TV series) =

Japanese anime series

- Cover art from the DVD release

名犬ジョリィ (Meiken Jorī)
- Genre: Adventure, Historical
- Anime television series
- Directed by: Keiji Hayakawa
- Studio: MK Company; Visual 80; Toho
- Original network: NHK
- English network: AU: ABC; CA: Radio-Canada; UK: CBBC; US: Nickelodeon
- Original run: April 7, 1981 – June 23, 1982
- Episodes: 52

Belle and Sebastian (名犬ジョリィ, Meiken Jorī; Famous Dog Jolie) is an anime adaption of the 1965 novel Belle et Sébastien by French author Cécile Aubry. The series ran on the Japanese network NHK from April 7, 1981, to March 24, 1982. It consists of 52 episodes and was a co-production of MK Company, Visual 80 Productions and Toho Company, Ltd.

Toshiyuki Kashiwakura was the head writer and character designs were by Shuichi Seki. The show was broadcast on French and Japanese television in 1981, with American cable network Nickelodeon picking it up in 1984. In the United Kingdom, it aired on Children's BBC in 1989 and 1990.

The anime used many staffers from Nippon Animation's World Masterpiece Theater franchise, thus the look and feel is similar to that of a WMT production even though Nippon Animation itself was not involved with this series.

The series has been aired in many countries outside Japan and has been dubbed and subtitled in English and numerous other languages. The English-language script was written by Eileen Opatut, and the series was dubbed into English by Synchro-Quebec in Montreal.

== Plot ==
The series is about the mountain-based adventures of a young boy named Sebastian and his Pyrenean mountain dog, Belle, who live in a small village in Southern France. He has no friends because he is bullied by the other children for not having a mother. But one day, he meets a gentle white dog who has been falsely accused of attacking people. He names her Belle and they become the best of friends. To save her from being put down, he leaves his adoptive family and flees to Spain with her and his little dog, Poochie. They have many adventures as they elude the police and search for his long-lost mother.

== Characters ==
Sebastian
Sebastian is a 9-year-old boy from a French village near the mountains. Although his age is never explicitly given, the repeated references to 'the events 9 years ago' throughout the series point to it. His name was chosen because he was born on St. Sebastian's Day. Since he was born, he has been living with his adoptive grandfather, Cecil, and Anne-Marie who is Cecil's real granddaughter. He is good-natured and energetic, but the children in town tease him because he doesn't have a real mother. Sebastian's deepest desires are to find his mother and to have a good friend.
Belle
Belle ("Jolie" in the Japanese version) is a large white Great Pyrenees who escaped into the French countryside. She is gentle and warmhearted, but her attempts to help those in need are misunderstood. She is labeled "The White Monster" and the police are constantly on her tail.
Poochie
Poochie is a little puppy who rides around in Sebastian's pocket. Although Poochie is always yapping and getting into mischief, he is a good friend to Sebastian and Belle.
Cecil
Cecil took Sebastian in as a baby and acts as his adoptive grandfather. He is a loving mentor who teaches him all he knows about the mountains and the wilderness.
Anne-Marie
Anne-Marie is Cecil's biological granddaughter. She has helped care for Sebastian since he was born, and fancies herself as his mother despite being the age of an older sister at best. She loves him deeply, but is often overprotective and a little harsh.
Paul
Paul is Anne-Marie's older brother. He's a soldier in the mountain army.
Isabel
Isabel is Sebastian's real mother, a traveling Romani. She went against the gypsy code and married an outsider, but he died before Sebastian was born. She had him secretly in the mountains, and promised to come back for him one day when her people were able to understand.
Sarah
Sarah is a sick, lonely little girl living in Spain who Sebastian meets on his journey. Both long for friends their own age to play with, so they quickly become close. During the series she celebrates her 9th birthday. Her father is a very rich man who gives her everything she can possibly desire, yet the only thing that can make Sarah happy is to have a truly good friend. She reappears several times during his journey to lend a helping hand. Towards the end of the series Sarah is celebrating her 9th birthday, meaning that she is perhaps only a month older than Sebastian himself. During the course of the series, a romantic bond forms between Sebastian and Sarah, and it is strongly implied that the two of them married when they grew up and lived happily ever after, with Belle still at their side.
Doctor Alexander Phillips (Original: Dr. Guillaume)
Dr. Phillips is a local doctor in the village where Sebastian lives, he's also Anne-Marie's boyfriend.
Mister Albert
Mr. Albert is Sarah's father, a rich man, well respected in the community, and doesn't like dogs. He slowly becomes fond of Belle and Poochie after they help Sarah to get well with her sickness. His love for his daughter ensures his willingness to aid the fugitives, if only for her sake. He is in fact a long term fan and admirer of Isabel, admitting to her that he was the man who sent her red roses in Barcelona; it is implied that a romantic attachment meant is growing between the couple and that their respective children approve.
Robert and Maria
Robert and Maria are servants at the home of Mr. Albert. Robert is the butler and sometimes chauffeur, while Maria is the housekeeper. They appear to be fond of each other but refuse to admit it, not even to themselves.
The Carlos Company
The Carlos Company is a band of gypsies whom Sebastian's mother, Isabel, is traveling with. Isabel is, in fact, their star performer because of her beauty and wonderful singing voice. She also makes and repairs the company's costumes, a skill she uses to good effect when she makes Anne-Marie a wedding dress.
Hernandez and Fernandez
Hernandez and Fernandez are a reoccurring duo of crooks that are trying to capture Belle for a quick rise to fame, fortune, and popularity.
Oscar and Johnny
Oscar is a traveling performer that uses his feats of strength by breaking chains wrapped around his body. Johnny is Oscar's son and also is a performer, but not in strength. His ability is that of balance and agility. They used to be members of the Carlos company and Oscar still holds a candle for Isabel in his heart, as well as a photo of her in his trunk, which he shows to Sebastian. He refuses to give it at first, as it is a prized possession.
Inspector Garcia
Inspector Garcia is an officer of the Spanish Police and is always hot on the trail of Belle and Sebastian. He is heavy-set and has a thin mustache.
Officer Martin
Officer Martin is the Inspector's assistant and a very clumsy man.
Commander Costello
Costello is the head of the Spanish Border Guards and has a strong resemblance to Fidel Castro.

== Episodes ==
No.	Title	Original release date
1	"Belle Meets Sebastian" "Hashire! Pirēne ni mukatte" (Japanese: 走れ！ ピレネーに向かって)	April 7, 1981
2	"The Hunt for Belle" "Hinangoya no nazo" (Japanese: 避難小屋の謎)	April 14, 1981
3	"A Night in the Mountains" "Iwayama no ichiya" (Japanese: 岩山の一夜)	April 21, 1981
4	"The Journey Begins" "Unmei no dai chōyaku" (Japanese: 運命の大跳躍)	April 28, 1981
5	"Escaping Smugglers" "Mitsuyu koya karano dasshutsu" (Japanese: 密輸小屋からの脱出)	May 12, 1981
6	"A Visit to Jail" "Kiki sukū chīsa na te" (Japanese: 危機救う小さな手)	May 19, 1981
7	"Meeting Sarah" "Inu kirai no keiji" (Japanese: 犬嫌いの刑事)	May 26, 1981
8	"A Promise to Sarah" "Yūhi no ōtaki kudari" (Japanese: 夕陽の大滝下り)	June 2, 1981
9	"Farewell to Sarah" "Sayonara no okurimono" (Japanese: さよならの贈り物)	June 9, 1981
10	"The Case of the Missing Sheep" "Bokujō no dorobō taiji" (Japanese: 牧場の泥棒退治)	June 16, 1981
11	"Puppy Love" "Kuzure kojō no bōken" (Japanese: 崩れ古城の冒険)	June 23, 1981
12	"Operation Substitute" "Kae tama daisakusen" (Japanese: 替え玉大作戦)	June 30, 1981
13	"The Runaway Car" "Hoshizora no Shanderiya" (Japanese: 星空のシャンデリヤ)	July 7, 1981
14	"An Act of Bravery" "Yūki aru sōsaku" (Japanese: 勇気ある捜索)	July 14, 1981
15	"Billy the Kid Bank Robber" "Ginkō gyangu no yūjō" (Japanese: 銀行ギャングの友情)	July 21, 1981
16	"The Old Man By the Sea" "Ojī-san no umi" (Japanese: おじいさんの海)	July 28, 1981
17	"Phantoms on a Ship" "Rokuni atta yūreisen" (Japanese: 陸に上った幽霊船)	August 11, 1981
18	"Smuggled on Board" "Nigedase hatsu kōkai" (Japanese: 逃げ出せ初航海)	August 18, 1981
19	"The Secret of the Castle Ghost" "Yūrei no sumu kojō" (Japanese: 幽霊の棲む古城)	September 1, 1981
20	"The Ghost's Revenge" "Yūrei no gyakushū" (Japanese: 幽霊の逆襲)	September 8, 1981
21	"Kidnapped" "Nin sarai no wana" (Japanese: 人さらいのわな)	September 15, 1981
22	"Chased by the Desperados" "Kesshi no hijōsen toppa" (Japanese: 決死の非常線突破)	September 29, 1981
23	"Mistaken Identities" "Mei hanji notakurami" (Japanese: 名判事のたくらみ)	October 6, 1981
24	"Double Crossed" "Mama wo shitteru tejinashi" (Japanese: ママを知ってる手品師)	October 13, 1981
25	"Meeting at the Mountain" "Hashire! mama no motoni" (Japanese: 走れ！ママのもとに)	October 20, 1981
26	"Isabel's Scarf" "Sukāfu ni takushita saikai" (Japanese: スカーフに託した再会)	November 3, 1981
27	"Three Sisters" "Honō no nakano ma inu" (Japanese: 炎の中の魔犬)	November 10, 1981
28	"Building a New Home" "Chīsa na oyakata dai katsuyaku" (Japanese: 小さな親方大活躍)	November 17, 1981
29	"Belle and Sebastian are Separated" "Ūnmei no tansen ressha" (Japanese: 運命の単線列車)	November 24, 1981
30	"It's a Boy!" "Kusari no mama no tōbō" (Japanese: くさりのままの逃亡)	December 1, 1981
31	"Reunited at Last" "Dakuryū wo koete" (Japanese: 濁流をこえて)	December 8, 1981
32	"When Johnny Comes Marching Home" "Mama no shashin" (Japanese: ママの写真)	December 15, 1981
33	"Sebastian Loses His Best Friend" "Uragitta Jorī" (Japanese: うらぎったジョリィ)	January 12, 1982
34	"Come Back to Me!" "Modore boku no teni" (Japanese: もどれぼくの手に)	January 19, 1982
35	"One Mistake After Another" "Oni keibu to bijin hikōshi" (Japanese: 鬼警部と美人飛行士)	January 26, 1982
36	"Poisoned!" "Mōdoku gahisomuhora ana" (Japanese: 猛毒がひそむほら穴)	February 2, 1982
37	"The Big Sleep" "Tobe! kibō no sora he" (Japanese: 飛べ！希望の空へ)	February 9, 1982
38	"Mom Didn't Forget Me" "Mama ha, yappari suteki dana" (Japanese: ママは、やっぱり素敵だな)	February 16, 1982
39	"Don't Drink the Water" "Shieranebada no warui mizu" (Japanese: シェラネバダの悪い水)	February 23, 1982
40	"Belle is Captured" "Bōreadōra no kyōfu" (Japanese: ボーレアドーラの恐怖)	March 2, 1982
41	"Help! Save Belle" "Jorī dakkaisakusen" (Japanese: ジョリィ奪回作戦)	March 9, 1982
42	"Make New Friends and Keep the Old" "Yomigaetta yūjō" (Japanese: よみがえった友情)	March 16, 1982
43	"On a Train Bound for Battle" "Pirēne chōtokkyū" (Japanese: ピレネー超特急)	April 13, 1982
44	"The Underground Railroad" "Okashina dai ressha sakusen" (Japanese: おかしな大列車作戦)	April 20, 1982
45	"A Kind Inspector Garcia" "Tanjō pātī de dasshutsu sakusen" (Japanese: 誕生パーティーで脱出作戦)	May 4, 1982
46	"Climbing a Wall of Stone" "Pirēne ōiwa kabe" (Japanese: ピレネー大岩壁)	May 11, 1982
47	"A Storm Brews" "Dai arashi no mae bure" (Japanese: 大嵐の前ぶれ)	May 18, 1982
48	"A Snowy Reunion" "Arashi no naka no saika" (Japanese: 嵐のなかの再会)	May 25, 1982
49	"The Devil's Corridor" "Akuma no kairō no dai nadare" (Japanese: 悪魔の回廊の大なだれ)	June 1, 1982
50	"Belle Risks Her Life" "Utagai hare te" (Japanese: うたがい晴れて)	June 8, 1982
51	"Mom Makes Up Her Mind" "Mama no kesshin" (Japanese: ママの決心)	June 18, 1982
52	"A Happy Ending" "Pirēne no aoi sora" (Japanese: ピレネーの青い空)	June 22, 1982
