= Belle and Sebastien: Friends for Life =

2018 French adventure drama film

- Theatrical release poster
- Directed by: Clovis Cornillac
- Written by: Juliette Sales; Fabien Suarez
- Based on: Belle et Sébastien by Cécile Aubry
- Produced by: Frédéric Brillion; Sidonie Dumas; Gilles Legrand; Clément Miserez; Matthieu Warter
- Starring: Félix Bossuet; Tchéky Karyo; Clovis Cornillac
- Cinematography: Thierry Pouget
- Edited by: Jean-François Elie
- Music by: Armand Amar
- Distributed by: Gaumont
- Release date: 7 February 2018
- Running time: 91 minutes
- Country: France
- Languages: French; Italian
- Budget: $13.5 million
- Box office: $33.9 million

Belle and Sebastien: Friends for Life (French: Belle et Sébastien 3, le dernier chapitre) is a 2018 French adventure drama film directed by Clovis Cornillac. It was based on the 1966 French novel Belle et Sébastien by Cécile Aubry, which in turn was based on the 1965 French TV series. The film is the last of a trilogy, as the first film adventure Belle and Sebastian, was released in 2013, and the second film being Belle & Sebastian: The Adventure Continues, released in 2015.

== Cast ==
- Félix Bossuet as Sébastien
- Tchéky Karyo as César
- Clovis Cornillac as Joseph
- Thierry Neuvic as Pierre
- Margaux Châtelier as Angélina
- André Penvern as Urbain
- Anne Benoît as Madeleine
- Lilou Fogli as Lisa
- Naëlle Thomas as Marie

== Production ==
Filming began in January 2017 in the Briançonnais (Hautes-Alpes). It then moved to Haute-Maurienne (Savoie), particularly in the communes of Bessans and Bonneval-sur-Arc. In April 2017, filming took place at the Aéroport de Dole, located near Gevry (Jura).

== Critical reception ==
The Sydney Morning Herald's Sandra Hall gave the film 3.5 stars, noting: "Schmaltzy or not, I was totally charmed." BMA Magazine's John P Harvey gave the film 4 out of 5 stars, praising the "[i]mpeccable performances" and heart-warming story. Stuff's James Croot wrote that despite the unoriginal narrative, the film offered "some impressive visuals of gorgeous snow-laden vistas, plenty of outdoor action".
