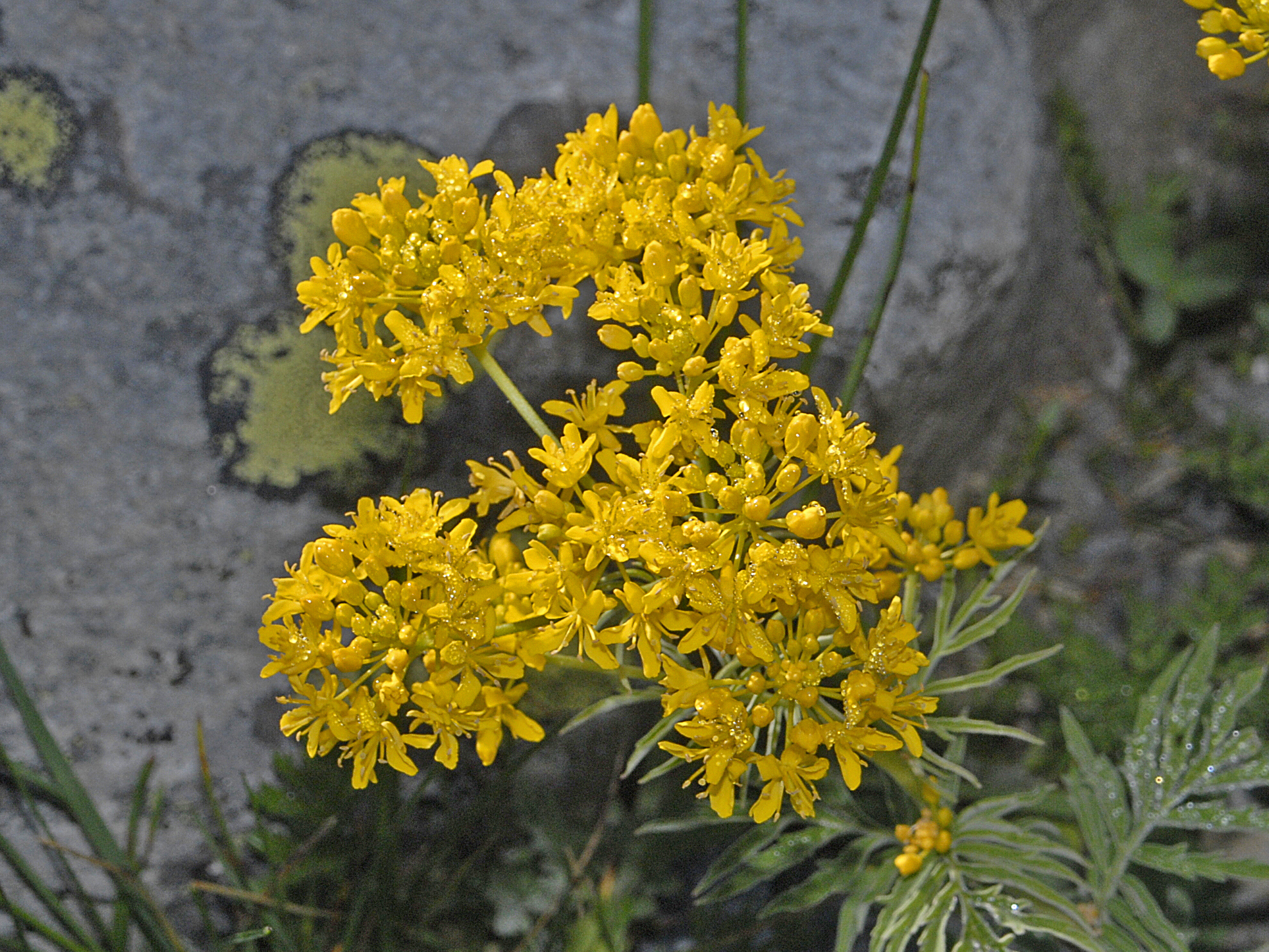
- Flowers of Hugueninia tanacetifolia subsp. suffruticosa at the Giardino Botanico Alpino Chanousia

Scientific classification
- Kingdom: Plantae
- Clade: Tracheophytes
- Clade: Angiosperms
- Clade: Eudicots
- Clade: Rosids
- Order: Brassicales
- Family: Brassicaceae
- Genus: Hugueninia; Rchb.
- Species: H. tanacetifolia

Binomial name
- Hugueninia tanacetifolia (L.) Rchb.

Synonyms
- Sisymbrium tanacetifolium L.; Descurainia tanacetifolia; Eruca tanacetifolia; Erysimum tanacetifolium; Hesperis tanacetifolia

= Hugueninia tanacetifolia =

Species of flowering plant

Hugueninia tanacetifolia, the tansy-leaved rocket, is a species of flowering plant in the monotypic genus Hugueninia belonging to the family Brassicaceae. Sometimes it is placed in genus Sisymbrium. Molecular genetic studies have shown it to be most closely related to, and possibly ancestral to the Canary Islands endemic species within the genus Descurainia.

== Etymology ==
The genus name honors Auguste Huguenin, botanist of Savoie of the nineteenth century. The Latin name of the species means "with leaves of tansy" because of the similarity of the leaves with some species of the genus Tanacetum.

== Description ==
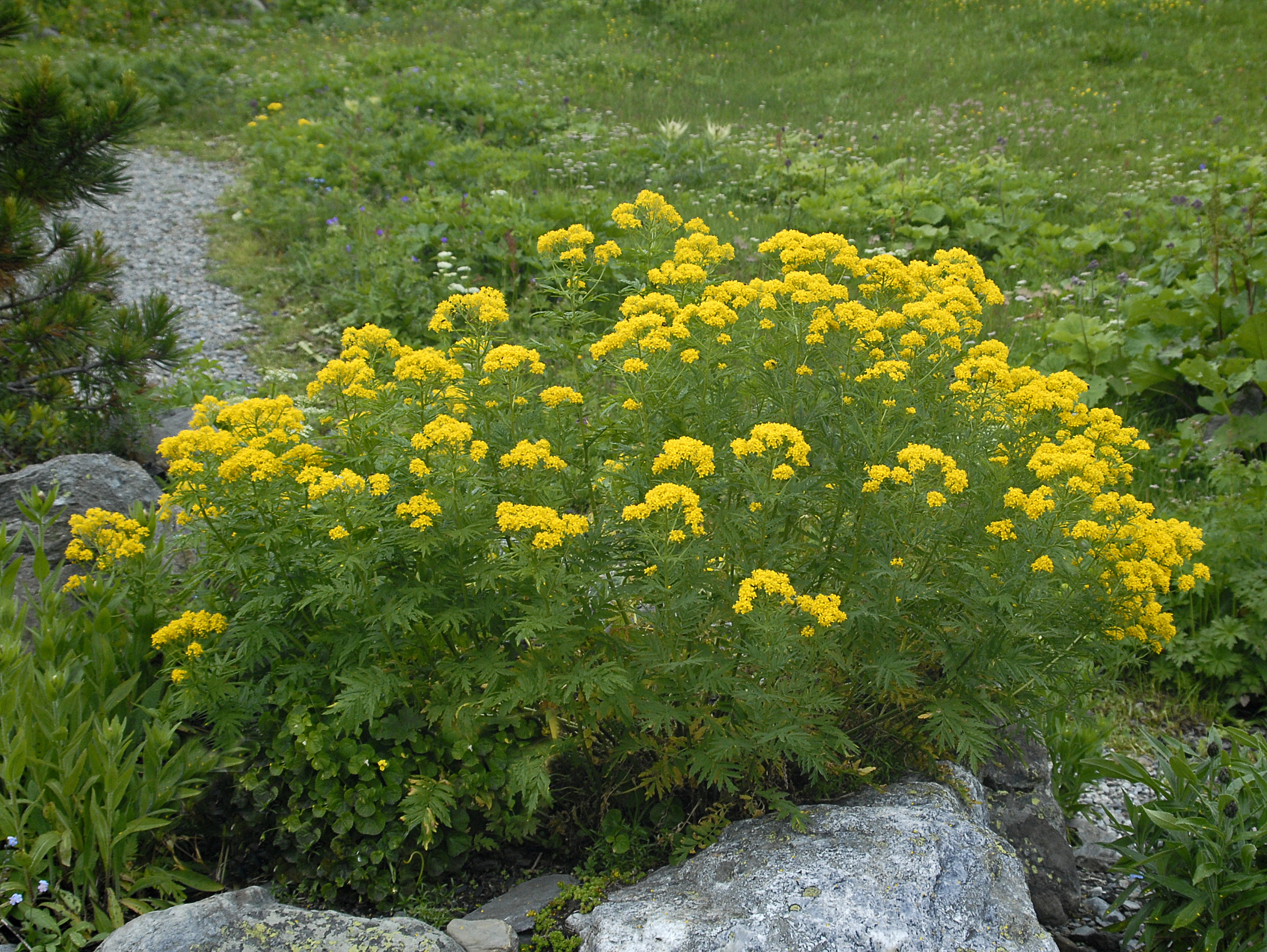
Plant of Hugueninia tanacetifolia

Hugueninia tanacetifolia can reach a height of 20–100 centimetres (7.9–39.4 in). This perennial stellate herb has erect glabrous or slightly hairy stem, branched at the top. Leaves are alternate, soft, up to 20 cm long, with a short petiole, lanceolate, toothed on the edges, imparipinnate with 5-10 pairs of segments. The small yellow cruciform flowers in small racemes bloom from June to August.

== Distribution ==
Tansy-leaved rocket is native to mountains of the Iberian Peninsula, France, Italy, Switzerland, the Pyrenees and the southwestern Alps.

== Habitat ==
This species prefers arid and rocky slopes at elevation of 1,500–2,500 metres (4,900–8,200 ft) above sea level.
