= Belle & Sebastian: The Adventure Continues =

2015 French adventure drama film

Belle and Sebastian: The Adventure Continues
- Theatrical release poster
- Directed by: Christian Duguay
- Written by: Juliette Sales; Fabien Suarez
- Based on: Belle et Sébastien by Cécile Aubry
- Produced by: Frédéric Brillion; Sidonie Dumas; Gilles Legrand; Clément Miserez; Matthieu Warter
- Starring: Félix Bossuet; Tchéky Karyo; Margaux Châtelier
- Cinematography: Christophe Graillot
- Edited by: Olivier Gajan
- Music by: Armand Amar
- Distributed by: Gaumont
- Release date: 9 December 2015
- Running time: 97 minutes
- Country: France
- Languages: French; Italian
- Budget: $15.1 million
- Box office: $14.5 million

Belle and Sebastian: The Adventure Continues (French: Belle et Sébastien: L'aventure continue) is a 2015 French adventure drama film directed by Christian Duguay. It was based on the 1966 French novel Belle et Sébastien by Cécile Aubry, which in turn was based on the 1965 French TV series. The film was the second of a trilogy, as the first film adventure Belle and Sebastian, was released on 18 December 2013, with the final film being Belle and Sebastien: Friends for Life, released in 2018.

== Cast ==
- Félix Bossuet as Sébastien
- Tchéky Karyo as César
- Thierry Neuvic as Pierre
- Margaux Châtelier as Angélina
- Thylane Blondeau as Gabriele
- Urbain Cancelier as The Mayor
- Joseph Malerba as Alfonso
- Ludi Boeken as Marcel
- Jeffrey Noel as Louis
- Frédéric Épaud as René

== Critical reception ==
On Rotten Tomatoes, the film has a rating of 78% based on 9 critical reviews. The Hollywood Reporter's Jordan Mintzer wrote that with its "broadly sketched characters and a narrative that feels closer to an afterschool special", the film "offers the kind of unsophisticated children's entertainment you don’t necessarily see being made anymore". The Age's Jake Wilson thought the film was simplistic and unoriginal, but "retains a good deal of charm".
