= Christian Duguay (director) =

Canadian film and television director (b. 1957)

- Born: March 30, 1957 (age 69); Montreal, Quebec, Canada
- Occupations: Director, producer, screenwriter, cinematographer
- Years active: 1984–present
- Children: 4

Christian Duguay (born March 30, 1957) is a Canadian film and television director, producer, screenwriter, and cinematographer. He has been nominated for three Primetime Emmy Awards, and is a two-time Gemini Award winner.

== Career ==
Duguay graduated from the Film Production program of Concordia University, in 1979. That year, his film Piece Interrompue Pour Piano Sauvage, together with Harold Trépanier, took the Best Cinematography award at the 11th Canadian Student Film Festival. He began his professional career as a cameraman and jack-of-all-trades, working in documentaries, commercials and music videos. He became known as an expert with the Steadicam and shot many movies of the week in the United States. He is best known for directing the action films Screamers (1995) starring Peter Weller and Roy Dupuis, and The Art of War (2000) starring Wesley Snipes and Michael Biehn. He directed the 1994 CBS/CBC drama, Million Dollar Babies, starring Beau Bridges based on the Dionne quintuplets. In May 2003, he directed the Emmy nominated miniseries Hitler: The Rise of Evil, which aired on the CBC, and in 2009 a television mini-series about Saint Augustine of Hippo. He followed this with Pius XII: Under the Roman Sky (2010), about Pope Pius XII and the occupation of Rome by the Nazis during World War II.

== Personal life ==
Duguay was married to Liliana Komorowska, who appeared in many of his films, including Scanners III: The Takeover, Screamers, and The Art of War. He has four children, Orlando, Sebastien, Natalia, and Victoria.

== Filmography ==
- Scanners II: The New Order (1991)
- Live Wire (1992)
- Scanners III: The Takeover (1992)
- Adrift (1993)
- Snowbound: The Jim and Jennifer Stolpa Story (1994) (TV)
- Million Dollar Babies (1994) (TV)
- Screamers (1995)
- The Assignment (1997)
- Joan of Arc (1999) (TV)
- The Art of War (2000)
- Extreme Ops (2002)
- Hitler: The Rise of Evil (2003) (TV)
- Human Trafficking (2005) (TV)
- Lies My Mother Told Me (2005) (TV)
- Boot Camp (2007)
- Coco Chanel (2008) (TV)
- Restless Heart: The Confessions of Saint Augustine (2010) (TV)
- Pius XII: Under the Roman Sky (2010)
- Cenerentola (2011) (TV)
- Anna Karenina (2013)
- Jappeloup (2013)
- Belle & Sebastian: The Adventure Continues (2015)
- A Bag of Marbles (2017)
- Ride Above (2022)

== Awards and nominations ==
- 2006, Directors Guild of Canada Craft Award (Outstanding Direction - Television Movie/Mini-Series) for Human Trafficking (2005) (TV)
- 2006, Gemini Award (Best Dramatic Mini-Series) for Human Trafficking (2005) (TV)
- 2006, nominated for a Gemini Award (Best Direction in a Dramatic Program or Mini-Series) for Lies My Mother Told Me (2005) (TV)
- 2003, nominated for an Emmy Award (Outstanding Miniseries) for Hitler: The Rise of Evil (2003) (TV)
- 1999, nominated for an Emmy Award (Outstanding Directing for a Miniseries or a Movie) for Joan of Arc (1999) (TV)
- 1996, Gemini Award (Best Direction in a Dramatic Program or Mini-Series) for Million Dollar Babies (1994) (TV)
