= Nicolas Vanier =

French adventurist, writer and director (born 1962)

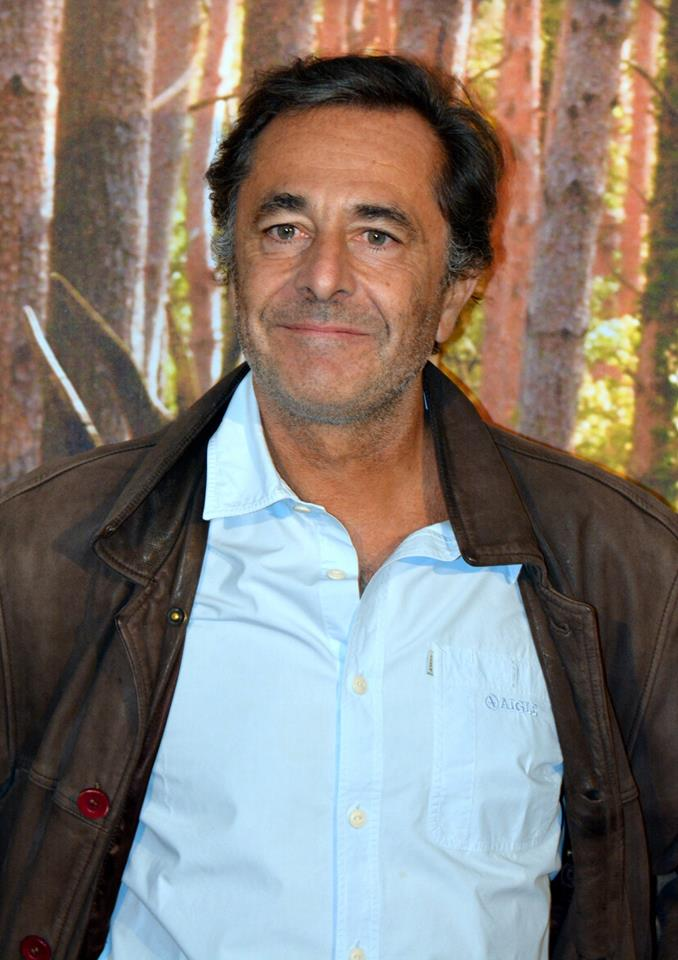
- Vanier in 2017.
- Born: 5 May 1962 (age 64); Senegal
- Occupations: Director, writer, cinematographer
- Years active: 1993–present

Nicolas Vanier (born 5 May 1962) is a French adventurer, writer and director.

== Films ==
Nicolas Vanier's 2004 film The Last Trapper followed a trapper in the Canadian Yukon. In 2009 Vanier's movie Loup ("Wolf") detailed the life of the Evens tribe in Siberia, Verkhoyansk mountain range, who lived by raising large herds of reindeer which they protected from attacking wolves.

In 2019, Nicolas Vanier's project Spread Your Wings sold well in the international markets.

== Events ==
In 2018 France Nature Environnement formally complained that Nicolas Vanier's film crew had disturbed a colony of Greater Flamingos by repeatedly flying overhead in an ultralight and causing an estimated 11% of the French breeding population to abandon its nests and eggs. Vanier later agreed to end his filmmaking and transfer the movie's location to Norway.

== Filmography ==
- Les coureurs de bois (1982)
- Au nord de l'hiver (1991)
- L'enfant des neiges (1995)
- Un hiver de chien (1997)
- L'Odyssée blanche (2000)
- The Last Trapper (2004)
- L'Odyssée sibérienne (2006)
- Loup (2009)
- Belle et Sébastien (2013)
- L'école buissonnière (2017)
- Spread Your Wings (Donne-moi des ailes) - 2019

== Bibliography ==
- Le triathlon historique (1988)
- Solitude nord (1990)
- Transsibérie, le mythe sauvage (1992)
- La vie en nord (1993)
- Solitudes blanches (1994)
- L'enfant des neiges (1995)
- Otchum, l'extraordinaire aventure d'un chien de traîneaux (1996)
- Nord, grand voyage dans le pays d'en haut (1997)
- Robinson du froid (1997)
- Un hiver sur les traces de Jack London (1997)
- Destin nord (1998)
- Territoire (1998)
- Le grand brame (1998)
- L'odyssée blanche (1999)
- C'est encore loin l'Alaska (2000)
- Le chant du grand nord (2002) - awarded the Prix Maurice Genevoix
- Le voyageur du froid (2003)
- L'or sous la neige (2004)
- L'Odyssée sibérienne (26 October 2006)
- Album illustré par Philippe Mignon (2006)
- Guide de l'aventurier (2006)
