= 10th César Awards =

1985 French film awards ceremony

- Date: 3 February 1985
- Site: Théâtre de l'Empire, Paris, France
- Hosted by: Pierre Tchernia

Highlights
- Best Film: My New Partner
- Best Actor: Alain Delon
- Best Actress: Sabine Azéma

Television coverage
- Network: Antenne 2

The 10th César Awards ceremony, presented by the Académie des Arts et Techniques du Cinéma, honoured the best French films of 1984 and took place on 3 February 1985 at the Théâtre de l'Empire in Paris. The ceremony was chaired by Simone Signoret and hosted by Pierre Tchernia. My New Partner won the award for Best Film.

== Winners and nominees ==
The winners are highlighted in bold:

- Best Film:
  **My New Partner**, directed by Claude Zidi
  L'amour à mort, directed by Alain Resnais
  Carmen, directed by Francesco Rosi
  Les Nuits de la pleine lune, directed by Éric Rohmer
  Un dimanche à la campagne, directed by Bertrand Tavernier
- Best Foreign Film:
  **Amadeus**, directed by Miloš Forman
  Greystoke: The Legend of Tarzan, Lord of the Apes, directed by Hugh Hudson
  Maria's Lovers, directed by Andrei Konchalovsky
  Paris, Texas, directed by Wim Wenders
- Best First Work:
  **La Diagonale du fou**, directed by Richard Dembo
  Boy Meets Girl, directed by Leos Carax
  Marche à l'ombre, directed by Michel Blanc
  Souvenirs souvenirs, directed by Ariel Zeitoun
- Best Actor:
  **Alain Delon**, for Notre histoire
  Michel Piccoli, for La Diagonale du fou
  Gérard Depardieu, for Fort Saganne
  Philippe Noiret, for Les Ripoux
  Louis Ducreux, for Un dimanche à la campagne
- Best Actress:
  **Sabine Azéma**, for Un dimanche à la campagne
  Julia Migenes, for Carmen
  Valérie Kaprisky, for La femme publique
  Pascale Ogier, for Les Nuits de la pleine lune
  Jane Birkin, for La Pirate
- Best Supporting Actor:
  **Richard Bohringer**, for L'Addition
  Lambert Wilson, for La femme publique
  Fabrice Luchini, for Les Nuits de la pleine lune
  Bernard-Pierre Donnadieu, for Rue barbare
  Michel Aumont, for Un dimanche à la campagne
- Best Supporting Actress:
  **Caroline Cellier**, for L'Année des méduses
  Élisabeth Bourgine, for La 7ème cible
  Victoria Abril, for L'Addition
  Maruschka Detmers, for La Pirate
  Carole Bouquet, for Rive droite, rive gauche
- Most Promising Actor:
  **Pierre-Loup Rajot**, for Souvenirs souvenirs
  Hippolyte Girardot, for Le Bon plaisir
  Benoît Régent, for La Diagonale du fou
  Xavier Deluc, for La Triche
- Most Promising Actress:
  **Laure Marsac**, for La Pirate
  Sophie Duez, for Marche à l'ombre
  Fanny Bastien, for Pinot simple flic
  Emmanuelle Béart, for Un amour interdit
- Best Director:
  **Claude Zidi**, for Les Ripoux
  Alain Resnais, for L'amour à mort
  Francesco Rosi, for Carmen
  Éric Rohmer, for Les Nuits de la pleine lune
  Bertrand Tavernier, for Un dimanche à la campagne
- Best Original Screenplay:
  **Bertrand Blier**, for Notre histoire
  Éric Rohmer, for Les Nuits de la pleine lune
  Claude Zidi, for Les Ripoux
- Best Adaptation:
  **Bertrand Tavernier, Colo Tavernier**, for Un dimanche à la campagne
  Françoise Giroud, Francis Girod, for Le Bon plaisir
  Andrzej Żuławski, Dominique Garnier, for La femme publique
- Best Cinematography:
  **Bruno de Keyzer**, for Un dimanche à la campagne
  Sacha Vierny, for L'amour à mort
  Pasqualino De Santis, for Carmen
  Bruno Nuytten, for Fort Saganne
- Best Costume Design:
  **Yvonne Sassinot de Nesle**, for Un amour de Swann
  Enrico Job, for Carmen
  Rosine Delamare, Corinne Jorry, for Fort Saganne
- Best Sound:
  **Dominique Hennequin, Guy Level, Harald Maury**, for Carmen
  Pierre Gamet, Jacques Maumont, for L'amour à mort
  Jean-Paul Loublier, Claude Villand, Pierre Gamet, for Fort Saganne
  Claude Villand, Bernard Leroux, Guillaume Sciama, for Souvenirs souvenirs
- Best Editing:
  **Nicole Saunier**, for Les Ripoux
  Claudine Merlin, for Notre histoire
  Geneviève Winding, for Souvenirs souvenirs
  Armand Psen, for Un dimanche à la campagne
- Best Music:
  **Michel Portal**, for Les Cavaliers de l'orage
  Hans Werner Henze, for L'amour à mort
  Michel Legrand, for Paroles et musique
  Bernard Lavilliers, for Rue barbare
- Best Production Design:
  **Jacques Saulnier**, for Un amour de Swann
  Enrico Job, for Carmen
  Jean-Jacques Caziot, for Les Cavaliers de l'orage
  Bernard Evein, for Notre histoire
- Best Animated Short:
  **La Boule**, directed by Alain Ughetto
  L'Invité, directed by Guy Jacques
  Ra, directed by Pierre Jamin, Thierry Barthes
- Best Fiction Short Film:
  Première classe, directed by Mehdi El Glaoui
  La Combine de la girafe, directed by Thomas Gilou
  Homicide by Night directed by Gérard Krawczyk
  Oiseau de sang directed by Frédéric Ripert
  Premiers mètres directed by Pierre Levy
- Best Documentary Short Film:
  **La Nuit du hibou**, directed by François Dupeyron
  Hommage à Dürer directed by Gérard Samson
  L'Écuelle et l'assiette, directed by Raoul Rossi
- Best French Language Film:
  **Wend Kuuni**, directed by Gaston Kaboré
- Honorary César:
  Christian-Jaque
  Danielle Darrieux
  Christine Gouze-Rénal
  Alain Poiré

== See also ==
- 57th Academy Awards
- 38th British Academy Film Awards
