= Francis Huster =

French filmmaker and actor

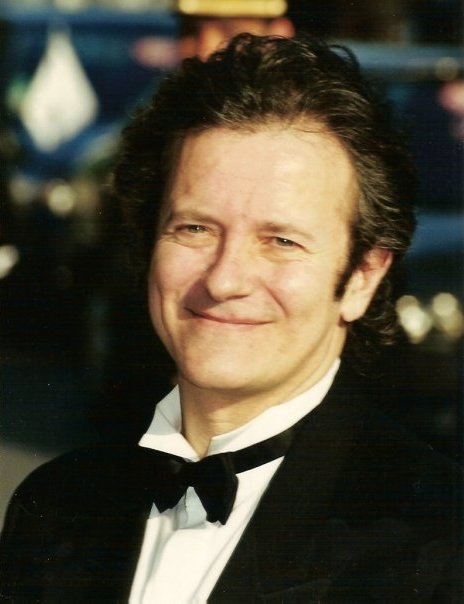
Huster at the 2001 Cannes Film Festival.

Francis Huster (born 8 December 1947) is a French stage, film and television actor, director and scriptwriter.

== Biography ==
Francis Huster was born in Neuilly-sur-Seine. His father is Charles Huster, commercial director at Lancia, and his Polish Jewish mother is Suzette Cwajbaum—who, during the Nazi era succeeded in persuading the Gestapo commandant in Paris to release her father, who had been arrested. However, her father refused to leave Paris, and was shot dead by the SS in Auschwitz as Soviet troops approached at the end of the war. He has two siblings; his older brother Jean-Pierre is a noted writer, and his younger sister, Muriel, is an actress, photographer and songwriter.

He studied acting at the Conservatoire of the 17th arrondissement of Paris, at the Cours Florent and at the Conservatoire national (1968), where he had René Simon and later Antoine Vitez as teachers. In the Cours Florent, later, he was teacher. Among his students, there was actor & photographer Gregory Herpe, director of the Comédie Française Eric Ruf, actors Jeanne Balibar, Elsa Zylberstein, Sandrine Kiberlain. He joined the Comédie-Française in 1971, became sociétaire in 1977, and left this institution in 1982. He later founded the theater group Compagnie Francis Huster, of which the following actors have been members: Clotilde Courau, Valérie Crunchant, Cristiana Reali, Estelle Skornik, Valentine Varela, Olivier Martinez, Mathieu Carrière.

== Awards ==
Francis Huster became Chevalier de la Legion d'Honneur in 1991, and was awarded the rank of "Officier" by Jacques Chirac in 2006. M Chirac commented: "C'est un comédien absolument exceptionnel qui se donne sans réserve à son art" ("He is an absolutely exceptional actor who dedicates himself totally to his art").

== Filmography ==
- 1970 : Chambres de bonne short film directed by Jean-Pierre Moulin
- 1970 : En attendant l'auto... short film directed by Gisèle Braunberger
- 1970 : La Faute de l'abbé Mouret, directed by Georges Franju
- 1972 : Faustine et le Bel Été, directed by Nina Companeez
- 1972 : L'histoire très bonne et très joyeuse de Colinot trousse-chemise, directed by Nina Companeez
- 1975 : Lumière, directed by Jeanne Moreau
- 1976 : Je suis Pierre Rivière, directed by Christine Lipinska
- 1976 : Si c'était à refaire, directed by Claude Lelouch
- 1977 : Comme sur des roulettes, directed by Nina Companeez
- 1977 : Un autre homme, une autre chance, directed by Claude Lelouch
- 1978 : En attendant Paul... short film directed by Georges Birtschansky
- 1978 : One, Two, Two : 122, rue de Provence, directed by Christian Gion
- 1978 : L'Adolescente (The Adolescent), directed by Jeanne Moreau
- 1979 : Les Égouts du paradis, directed by José Giovanni
- 1980 : Les Uns et les Autres (Bolero), directed by Claude Lelouch
- 1981 : Qu'est-ce qui fait courir David?, directed by Élie Chouraqui
- 1982 : Édith et Marcel, directed by Claude Lelouch
- 1983 : J'ai épousé une ombre, directed by Robin Davis
- 1983 : Équateur, directed by Serge Gainsbourg
- 1983 : Le Faucon, directed by Paul Boujenah
- 1983 : Drôle de samedi, directed by Bay Okan
- 1984 : Première Classe, short film directed by Mehdi El Glaoui
- 1984 : La femme publique (The Public Woman), directed by Andrzej Żuławski
- 1984 : L'Amour braque, directed by Andrzej Żuławski
- 1985 : Parking, directed by Jacques Demy
- 1985 : Drôle de samedi, directed by Tunç Okan
- 1986 : On a volé Charlie Spencer !, directed by Francis Huster
- 1989 : Il y a des jours... et des lunes, directed by Claude Lelouch
- 1992 : Tout ça... pour ça !, directed by Claude Lelouch
- 1995 : Dieu, l'amant de ma mère et le fils du charcutier d'Aline Issermann
- 1998 : Le Dîner de Cons (The Dinner Game), directed by Francis Veber
- 2000 : L'Envol, directed by Steve Suissa
- 2000 : Elle pleure pas short film directed by Steve Suissa
- 2004 : Pourquoi (pas) le Brésil, directed by Laetitia Masson
- 2004 : Le Rôle de sa vie (The Role of Her Life), directed by François Favrat
- 2005 : Le courage d'aimer (scenes deleted), directed by Claude Lelouch
- 2006 : Hey Good Looking!, directed by Lisa Alessandrin
- 2008 : A Man and His Dog, directed by Francis Huster
- 2017 : Chacun sa vie et son intime conviction, directed by Claude Lelouch
