= Aphrodite: mœurs antiques =

Novel by Pierre Louÿs

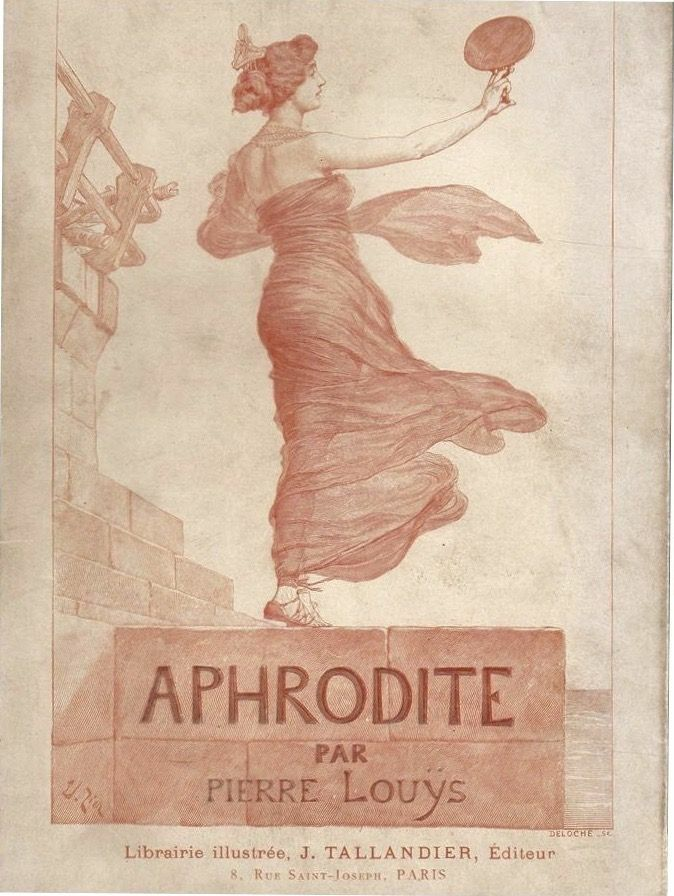
Illustration by Édouard François Zier

Aphrodite: mœurs antiques ("Aphrodite: ancient morals") is an 1896 French-language novel by Pierre Louÿs.

== Summary ==
Set in Alexandria, the novel tells the story of Chrysis, a courtesan, and the sculptor Démétrios. A Galilaean with long golden hair (source of her Greek nickname), Chrysis is proud of her beauty and her skill at winning the devotion and servility of men.

Démétrios, for his part, is worshipped by the women of the town, but has grown tired of their devotion. He has come to prefer his statue of the goddess Aphrodite even to his lover, Queen Bérénice, who posed for it. Chrysis is the only woman who does not care for him.

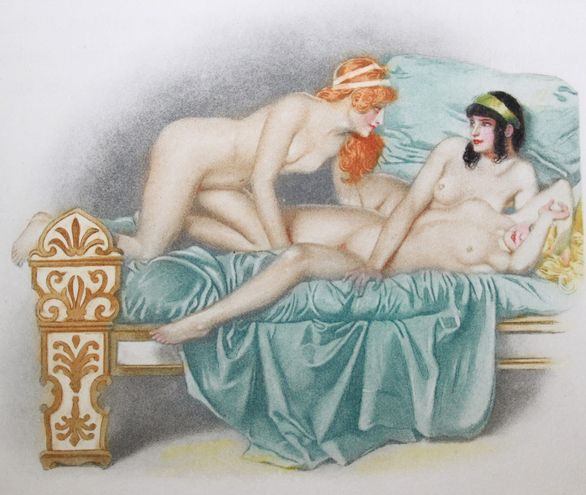
Illustration by Maurice Ray for Pierre Louÿs's Aphrodite: mœurs antiques

Piqued into desire by her resistance, Démétrios is spurred to commit theft and murder for her, to win the three objects she demands in return for her charms: a rival courtesan's silver mirror, the ivory comb of an Egyptian priestess, and the pearl necklace that adorns the cult image in the temple of Aphrodite. After carrying out these errands, Démétrios dreams of the night of love that Chrysis has offered him and while she falls in love with the man who was moved to crime for her, Démétrios rejects the real Chrysis, sufficed by his dream.

She presses her desire, so he makes her swear, as he had, to do his bidding, before revealing what it is: to wear the stolen items in public. She does so, appearing on the Lighthouse of Alexandria in the role of Aphrodite, nude and with the items worn as the attributes of the goddess. Imprisoned and condemned, Chrysis drinks hemlock in the indifferent presence of Démétrios.

He then uses her nude body as a model, posing it in the violent attitude in which he had seen her in his dream, to create the statue of Immortal Life.

== History ==
Upon its release, Aphrodite was such a success that it launched the Mercure de France publishing house. The success was due in part to a rave review by François Coppée, and no doubt also to the libertine scenes throughout the book. Louÿs had previously only published limited run pamphlets. The book caused a scandal, and reviewer Dorothy Parker noted how difficult it was to obtain in New York, and that a play by George Hazelton based on the book was likewise successful because it was denounced as obscene by the mayor.

Louÿs's ideal was to write for an elite of a few friends such as Mallarmé, Régnier, Gide, and Valéry. As an author he presented himself as an "Athenian", for whom "there was nothing more sacred than physical love, nothing more beautiful than the human body." In his Alexandria, a dreamlike reconstruction combining erudition and fin de siècle Orientalism, amoral and violent pleasure takes first place (the loves of Chrysis, the relationship between two young musician girls, the feasts of Aphrodite, the banquet and orgy concluding with the crucifixion of a female slave); only Démétrios has an ideal, distinguishing "the just from the unjust according to the criterion of beauty," far from the "narrow virtues of modern moralists": he regrets his crimes only because he lowered himself to commit them.

== English translations ==
- 1906 – Charles Carrington
- 1932 – Willis L. Parker
- 1972 – Robert Baldick

== Adaptations ==
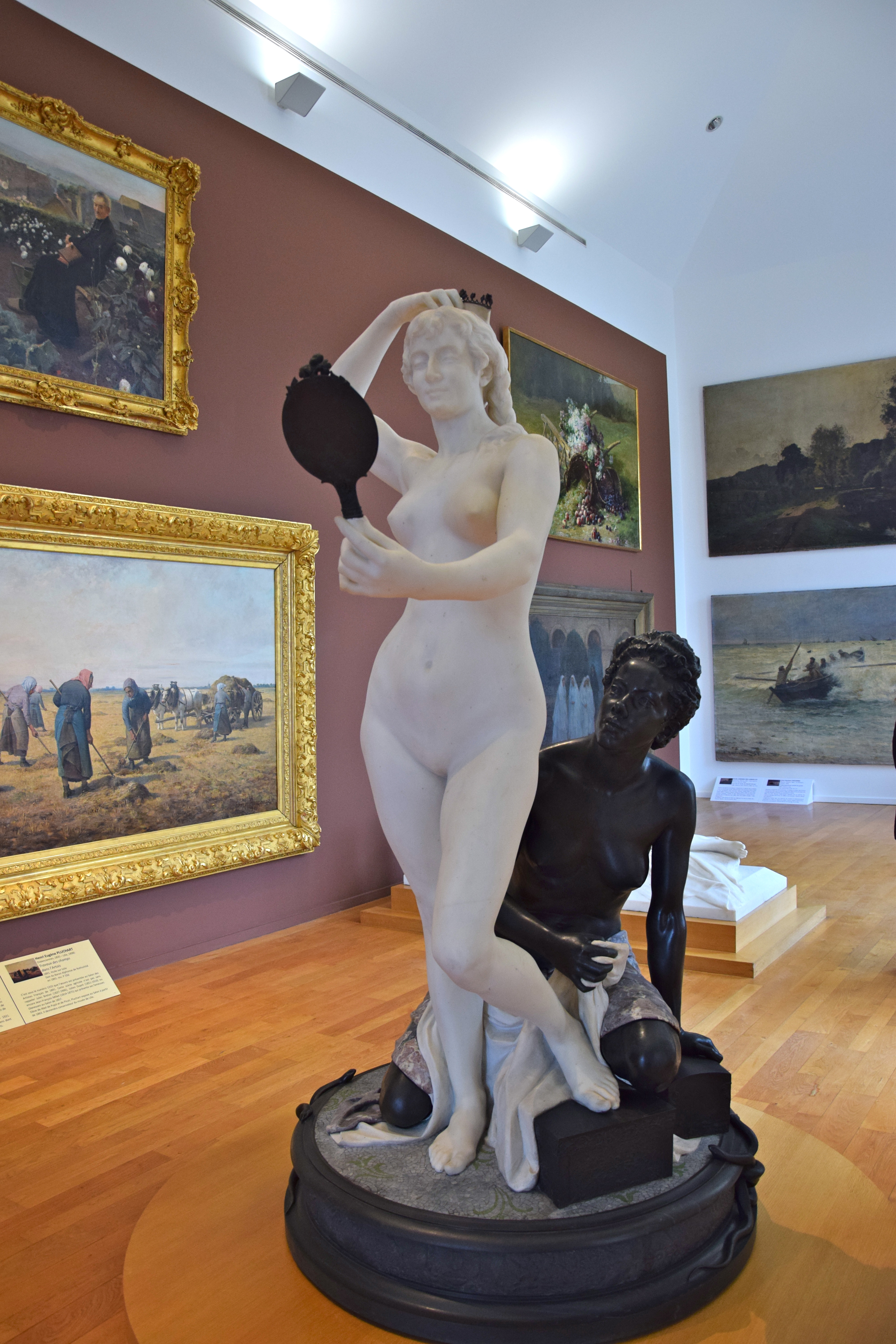
Le Miroir by Joseph Carlier.

=== Film ===
- Aphrodite. 1982 film by Robert Fuest, starring Valérie Kaprisky, Capucine, Catherine Jourdan, Delia Boccardo, and Horst Buchholz.

=== Plastic arts ===
- Le Miroir. Sculpture by Joseph Carlier representing Chrysis with her rival's mirror, shown at the Exposition Universelle (1900) in Paris, and now at the Musée des Beaux-Arts de Cambrai.

=== Music ===
- Aphrodite. Drame musical in five acts and seven tableaux, composed by Camille Erlanger, adapted by Louis de Gramont, premiered 23 (or 27?) March 1906, Opéra-Comique, Paris.
- Aphrodite, opera with a libretto by Hans Liebstoeckl, composed by Max von Oberleithner (de), premiered 1912 at the Hofoper, Vienna.
  - The 2013/14 season of the Bayerische Theaterakademie August Everding included a performance of this opera, with piano accompaniment, on 5 May 2014.
- Aphrodite. Monodramma di costumi antichi, composed by Giorgio Battistelli. Premiered July 1988, Villa Massimo, Rome.
