= Belle, Sebastian and the Horses =

- Also known as: Belle and the Horses
- Genre: Children
- Created by: Cécile Aubry
- Starring: Mehdi El Glaoui
- Country of origin: France
- Original language: French
- No. of seasons: 1
- No. of episodes: 13

Production
- Running time: 26 minutes

Original release
- Network: ORTF
- Release: 4 February – 28 April 1968

Belle, Sebastian and the Horses is a children's television programme from 1968. It was a sequel to the 1965 series Belle and Sebastian, and also starred Mehdi El Glaoui as Sebastian. It was filmed in France as Sébastien parmi les hommes as thirteen colour episodes, and re-titled by the BBC.

== Plot ==
Sebastian's father Pierre Maréchal finds out that Sebastian is alive and invites him over to his horse ranch. Things soon get complicated when Pierre's rich fiancée finds out about Sebastian's existence. The English title may be a slight misnomer as the dog Belle only appears fairly briefly, she is separated from the horses after she reacts negatively barking at them. It was not quite as successful as the earlier series, although it was repeated a couple of times by the BBC after its first screening in late 1968, and also shown once by RTÉ.
