= Sébastien et la Mary-Morgane =

- Genre: Drama
- Created by: Cécile Aubry
- Written by: Cécile Aubry
- Directed by: Cécile Aubry
- Composer: Daniel White
- Country of origin: France
- No. of seasons: 1
- No. of episodes: 13

Production
- Producer: Etienne Laroche
- Running time: 26 min.

Original release
- Release: 10 March 1970

Sébastien et la Mary-Morgane (English: Sebastian and the Mary Morgan) is a French television series broadcast in 1970. It was created by French actress Cécile Aubry, based on her book Belle et Sébastien and television series of the same name, about a six-year-old boy named Sébastien and his dog Belle, a Pyrenean Mountain Dog, who lives in a village in the French Alps close to the frontier with Italy. In this spin-off series, Sébastien is now 12 years of age and his beloved dog, Belle, died a few months ago leaving him lonely and upset, "inconsolable". His father sends him on vacation to the northern coastal town of Fécamp to stay with his curious old uncle, captain of a fishing vessel, named the Mary-Morgane.

Sébastien et la Mary-Morgane aired on ORTF. The series was produced by Etienne Laroche and stars Mehdi El Glaoui as the boy Sébastien. It premiered on March 10, 1970 and thirteen episodes were produced, each lasting twenty-six minutes. It was shown in France, Belgium and Canada. The music to the series was composed by Daniel White.

== Plot ==
Sent by his father, Sébastien gets to know an old uncle, Captain Louis Maréchal, a fishing-boat operator, in his mansion at Morsant. He meets Jonathan and Clarisse who work in the household of Sophie-Virginie, the daughter of his uncle's business partner. Little by little, he learns the secrets behind his uncle, a former resistance fighter who lost his wife and his son 25 years ago, time stopping for him in January 1943. In the light of the different stories he hears, Sébastien first blames him but then shows understanding and affection for his old uncle.

== Cast ==
- Mehdi El Glaoui : Sébastien Maréchal
- Charles Vanel : Louis Maréchal
- Jacqueline Dano : Clarisse
- Jacques Godin : Jonathan
- Carl Schell : Carl Walter
- Paul Barge : Gwen Théphanie
- Yutta d'Arcy : Sophie-Virginie « Siza » Walter
- Henri-Jacques Huet : Dr Grégoire Savel

== Production ==
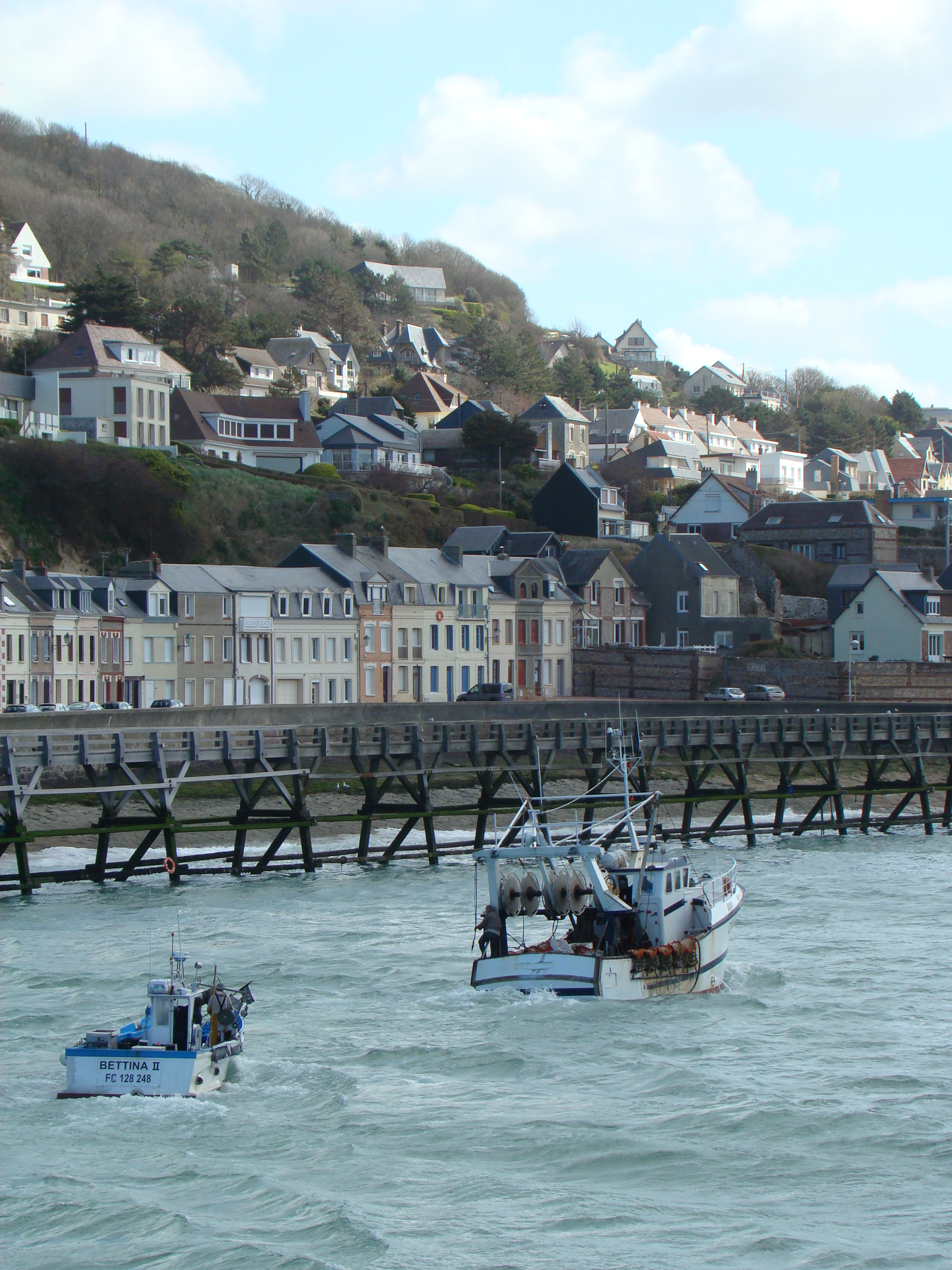
The fishing town of Fécamp where the series is set

The series was shot in 1969, partly in the commune of Fécamp on the English Channel of northern France. The main actor, Mehdi El Glaoui, playing the boy, was thirteen years old at the time of shooting. He was the son of the series creator, actress Cécile Aubry and Si Brahim El Glaoui, caïd (local administrator) of Telouet, incidentally making him the grandson of T'hami El Glaoui, pasha of Marrakesh. Charles Vanel, a veteran French actor who had played a desperate truck driver in Clouzot's The Wages of Fear (1953), and a restaurateur opposite Cary Grant and Grace Kelly in Alfred Hitchcock's To Catch a Thief (1955), was cast as Sébastien's eccentric but friendly fisherman uncle Louis Maréchal. Actress and singer Jacqueline Dano was cast as Clarisse the housekeeper, and Israeli pop star Mike Brant also appears.

== Release ==
Classed as a comedy-drama, Sébastien et la Mary-Morgane premiered on March 10, 1970 on ORTF and thirteen episodes were produced, each lasting twenty-six minutes. The scenes of Sébastien riding along on his stallion and then sobbing were noted by critics. Capitalizing on the success of the character, the theme soundtrack to the series, composed by Daniel White and featuring the boy singing in French, was released on Philips Records, subtitled "la sirene au longs cheveux série tv". The credits to the series featured the theme soundtrack with the boy singing, with a dark orange and dark shadowed background shadowing the ships associated with the town of setting, with a video introduction by the creator, Cécile Aubry.

Unlike the original series Belle et Sébastien, which was dubbed into English and became essential "school holiday" viewing in the United Kingdom, it wasn't shown in that country and was only screened in France and Canada. It was aired again on French television in January 1978, and was released on Gaumont Home Video. It was released on DVD as Belle et Sébastien - L'intégrale on 23 November 2005.

== Episodes ==
Thirteen episodes were produced:

1. Le Manoir de Morsan
2. Si Jonathan voulait parler
3. Mademoiselle Sophie-Virginie
4. La Cave de Morsan
5. SOS au large du Groenland
6. Une si longue attente
7. Pour ceux qui attendent le Narval
8. Le Retour du Narval
9. Morsan ne répond plus
10. La Vérité
11. La Fête chez Angèle
12. L’Appel de la mer
13. Les Dernières Volontés du capitaine Maréchal
