= Première Classe =

- Directed by: Mehdi El Glaoui
- Written by: Marc Siauve-Evausy
- Produced by: Alain Grandgérard
- Cinematography: Patrick Thibaut
- Edited by: Marie Robert
- Music by: Marc Siauve-Evausy
- Release date: 1984
- Running time: 11 minutes
- Country: France
- Language: French

Première Classe is a 1984 short film directed by Mehdi El Glaoui. It received the César Award for Best Short Film at the 10th César Awards.

== Synopsis ==
The short romantic comedy follows the encounter of a man and a woman in a train compartment.

== Cast ==
- André Dussollier
- Francis Huster
- Pierre Charras
- Beth Todd
