= The Black Rose =

1950 British film by Henry Hathaway

- Poster
- Directed by: Henry Hathaway
- Written by: Thomas B. Costain (novel)
- Screenplay by: Talbot Jennings
- Based on: The Black Rose (1945) by Thomas B. Costain
- Produced by: Louis D. Lighton
- Starring: Tyrone Power; Orson Welles; Cécile Aubry; Jack Hawkins; Michael Rennie; Finlay Currie; Herbert Lom; Mary Clare; Bobby Blake; Alfonso Bedoya; Gibb McLaughlin; James Robertson Justice; Henry Oscar; Roger Bacon; Laurence Harvey
- Cinematography: Jack Cardiff
- Edited by: Manuel del Campo
- Music by: Richard Addinsell
- Color process: Technicolor
- Production company: Twentieth Century-Fox Film Productions
- Distributed by: 20th Century Fox
- Release date: 7 September 1950 (London)
- Running time: 121 minutes
- Country: United Kingdom
- Language: English
- Box office: $2.65 million (US rentals)

The Black Rose is a 1950 British historical adventure film directed by Henry Hathaway and starring Tyrone Power and Orson Welles.

Talbot Jennings' screenplay was loosely based on a 1945 novel of the same name by Canadian author Thomas B. Costain, introducing an anachronistic Saxon rebellion against the Norman aristocracy as a vehicle for launching the protagonists on their journey to the Orient.

It was filmed partly on location in England and Morocco which substitutes for the Gobi Desert of China. The film was partly conceived as a follow-up to the movie Prince of Foxes (1949), and reunited the earlier film's two male leads.

British costume designer Michael Whittaker was nominated at the 23rd Academy Awards for his work on the film (Best Costumes-Color).

== Plot ==
Tyrone Power and Cécile Aubry

Two hundred years after the Norman Conquest, during the reign of Edward I, Saxon scholar Walter of Gurnie, the illegitimate son of the lately deceased Earl of Lessford, returns from Oxford and hears the reading of his father's will. He receives only a pair of boots, but Walter recognizes it as a token of his father's love for him. The earl's Norman widow takes Saxon hostages against possible unrest. Walter joins a group of Saxons who free them but is forced to flee England when he is recognized.

Walter, accompanied by his friend Tristram Griffen, a Saxon archer, sets out to make his fortune in Cathay (China) during the time of the Pax Mongolica. The pair join a caravan bearing gifts from the merchant Anthemus to Kublai Khan, who is preparing to invade Cathay. The caravan is under the protection of Mongol general Bayan of the Hundred Eyes. Impressed by Tristram's archery skill and his English longbow and Walter's scholarship, Bayan takes an interest in the Englishmen.

Lu Chung, the head of the caravan, blackmails Walter into assisting the escape of Maryam, Anthemus's half-English sister, nicknamed the "Black Rose", (Note: Black Rose is a quotation from the book by Thomas B. Costain. "I speak of lady," he said. "This lady different from others. She has great spirit, a tang like the black rose." 'Black Rose' being another name for cloves.) being sent as one of the gifts. Maryam loves Walter, but he is too interested in his adventure to pay her any attention. Tristram does not like all the killing and decides to get away. He takes Maryam with him because she wants to go to England.

Bayan sends Walter on a mission to see the Song dynasty Empress of that part of Cathay not yet under Mongol rule. When he arrives, he is told that he must stay in Cathay as a "guest" for the rest of his life. Then he finds Tristram and Maryam had also been captured and imprisoned. During this time, Walter realizes he loves Maryam. The three of them decide to escape. Tristram dies. The small boat in which Maryam is waiting for Walter in drifts away before Walter can catch her. Walter returns to England alone.

Walter is welcomed back by the Norman King Edward because of all the cultural and scientific knowledge (including gunpowder) he has brought back from China. The king knights Walter and grants him a coat of arms. Two Mongol emissaries from Bayan show up. They have brought the Black Rose to England to join Walter there.

== Cast ==
- Tyrone Power as Walter of Gurnie
- Orson Welles as Bayan of the Hundred Eyes
- Cécile Aubry as Maryam
- Jack Hawkins as Tristram Griffen
- Michael Rennie as King Edward I
- Finlay Currie as Alfgar
- Herbert Lom as Anthemus
- Mary Clare as Eleanor, Countess of Lessford
- Robert Blake as Mahmoud
- Alfonso Bedoya as Lu Chung (voice dubbed by Peter Sellers, uncredited)
- Gibb McLaughlin as Wilderkin
- James Robertson Justice as Simeon Beautrie
- Henry Oscar as Friar Roger Bacon
- Laurence Harvey as Edmond

== Production ==
The Black Rose was the first film Henry Hathaway directed after an operation for cancer. He had a doctor with him on set. Hathaway later said he felt the movie was badly cast, saying Jack Hawkins was "too old" for his role ("it should have been played by someone like Van Johnson") and that Cécile Aubry "didn't have a lick of sense. I tried to get Leslie Caron but Caron said she loved ballet and didn't want to be in pictures." He also says he and Orson Welles got along "terrible" because Welles would not follow direction. "It pleased him to outwit people. That was the trouble with him throughout his career." However he admired Welles.

The Black Rose is among the first American features to be filmed on location after the Second World War, shot largely in North Africa.

== Reception ==
Trade papers called the film a "notable box office attraction" in British cinemas in 1950.

== Theme ==
According to biographer Kingley Canham, Tyrone Power's character, the dispossessed Walter of Gurnie, emerges as “an unsavory Hathaway hero.”

The Norman king, Edward I (Michael Rennie), who would relinquish his crown to see a unified England, is dismissed by the Saxon Walter, who considers the king's overtures as perfidy. Rather than remain in England after being fraudulently disinherited by his Norman step-mother, Walter seeks his fortune in the Far East. Canham writes:

While, on the one hand, Walter refuses to become involved in domestic quarrels, he reveals that his apparent patriotism—in this case his strong stance against the Normans—is in fact secondary to his desire for power through possessions…

After Walter's fellow Saxon and comrade, Tristram the bowman, is killed, he returns to England. Canham describes the film's denouement: “Walter, having fulfilled his destiny in a determinedly Fascist manner, receives recognition for discoveries that are not of his own making; relies on the power and protection of a warlord to further his interests and ends up getting the girl whom he had constantly abused and cynically mistreated.”

== See also ==
- The Great Wall (2016)
- List of historical drama films

== Sources ==
- Canham, Kingsley (1973). The Hollywood Professionals: Michael Curtiz, Raoul Walsh, Henry Hathaway, Volume 1. New York: The Tanvity Press, A. S. Barnes Co. p. 200. ISBN 978-0900730580.
