= Michael Whittaker (costume designer) =

British costume designer and actor

- Occupations: Costume designer and actor
- Years active: 1942-1963

Michael Whittaker (April 1918 - 1995) was a British costume designer and actor.

He was nominated at the 23rd Academy Awards for his work on the film The Black Rose. This was in the category of Best Costumes-Color.

== Filmography ==
=== As actor ===
- The Avengers (1942)
- Flying Fortress (1942)
- In Which We Serve (1942)
- Read All About It (1945) (short film)

=== As costume designer ===
- The Black Rose (1950)
- The Naked Heart (1950)
- Flesh & Blood (1951)
- Lilli Marlene (1951)
- The Story of Robin Hood and His Merrie Men (1952)
- The Men of Sherwood Forest (1954)

He also worked on the British TV show The Avengers.
