= Aphrodite (film) =

1982 film by Robert Fuest

- Directed by: Robert Fuest
- Written by: John Melson; Jean Ardy
- Based on: Aphrodite: mœurs antiques (1896 novel) by Pierre Louÿs
- Produced by: Adolphe Viezzi
- Starring: Horst Buchholz; Valérie Kaprisky; Delia Boccardo; Capucine
- Cinematography: Bernard Daillencourt
- Edited by: Noëlle Balenci
- Music by: Jean-Pierre Stora
- Production company: Les Films de la Tour; Carlton Film Export; Almira Films
- Distributed by: Prodis
- Release date: 7 July 1982
- Running time: 96 minutes
- Countries: France; Switzerland; West Germany
- Language: French

Aphrodite is a 1982 erotic drama film directed by Robert Fuest, loosely based on the 1896 novel Aphrodite: mœurs antiques by Belgian author Pierre Louÿs. It stars Horst Buchholz, Valérie Kaprisky, Delia Boccardo and Capucine. The story follows a group of visitors who come to an island where they are involved in different sexual liaisons.

The film was a French-Swiss-West German co-production. Filming took place in Hauts-de-Seine in France. It was the final theatrical film by Robert Fuest.

== Cast ==
- Horst Buchholz as Harry Laird
- Valérie Kaprisky as Pauline
- Delia Boccardo as Barbara
- Capucine as Lady Suzanne Stanford
- Catherine Jourdan as Valerie
- Yves Massard as Baron Orloff
- Daniel Beretta as Mark
- Monica Nickel as Julie

== Release ==
Aphrodite was released in France on 7 July 1982. The film was released in France on VHS in 1985.
