= Joseph Carlier =

French sculptor (1849–1927)

Émile Nestor Joseph Carlier
- Émile Joseph Nestor Carlier by Alphonse-Eugène Lechevrel (1848–1924)
- Born: 3 January 1849; Cambrai
- Died: 11 April 1927 (aged 78); Paris
- Education: École nationale supérieure des beaux-arts
- Known for: Sculpture
- Notable work: Enguerrand de Monstrelet, (1876) – La Résurrection, (1877)
- Movement: Art Nouveau

Émile Nestor Joseph Carlier (3 January 1849 – 11 April 1927), called Joseph Carlier, was a French sculptor.

== Biography ==
=== Early years ===
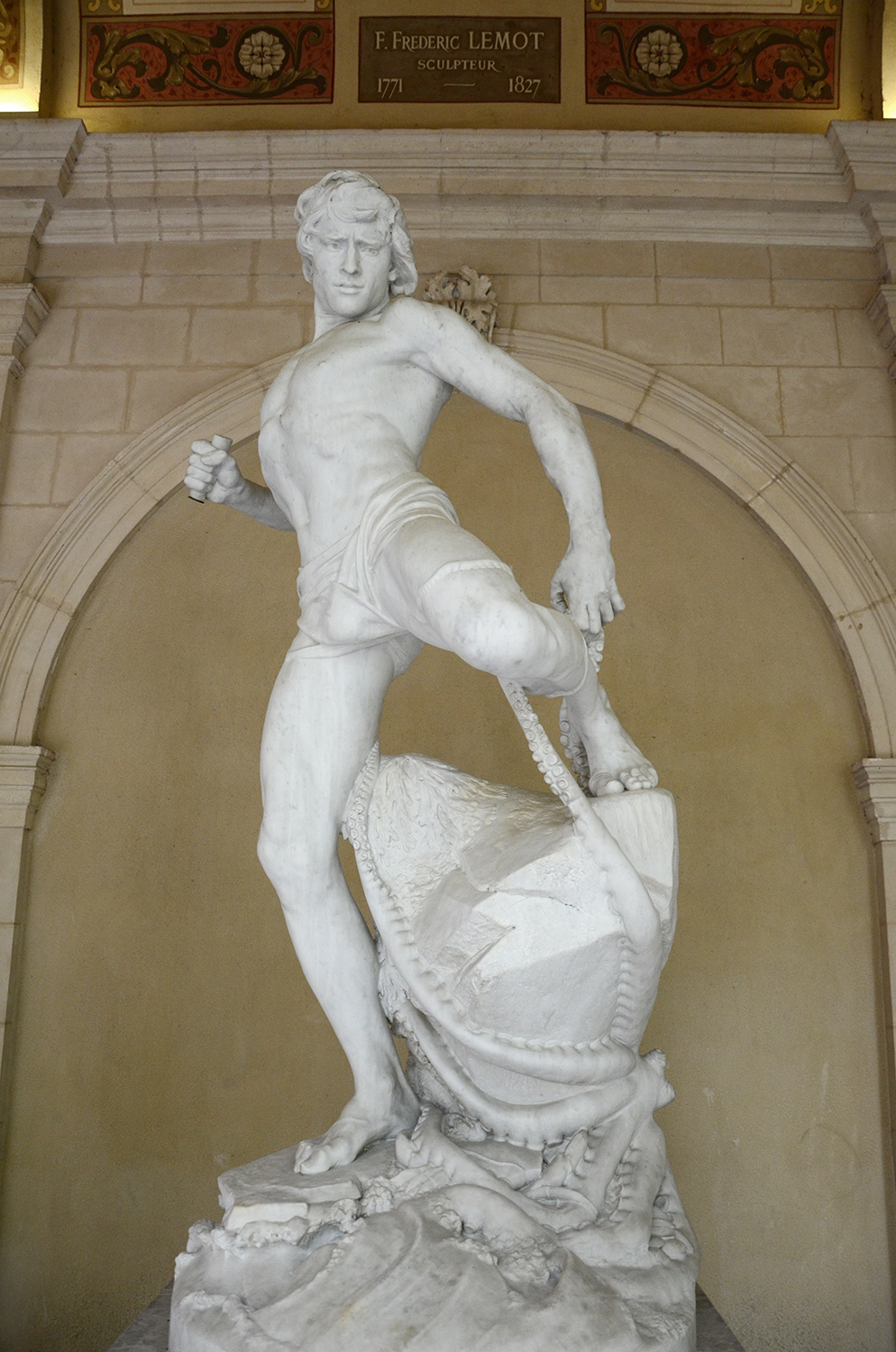
Gilliat Struggling with the Octopus

Émile Nestor Joseph Carlier was born in Cambrai on 3 January 1849, in the Rue de la Prison, the current location of the town hall. He attended the Municipal School, then at 15 joined the studio of the ornamental sculptor Lecaron in Cambrai. He began work carving the stones of the Cambrai cathedral. At one time he fell from a scaffold and was saved only by his bag's strap catching on a pole.

He went to Paris, visiting the Universal Exhibition of 1867, which confirmed his vocation as an artist. Receiving no financial support from his parents, he had to support himself through minor jobs, and entered the house of a furniture manufacturer of the Faubourg Saint-Antoine. Then he returned to Cambrai to follow a course of academic study in the workshop of René Fache, where he was a dedicated and studious pupil. His teacher convinced Carlier's parents to let him go to Paris to enter the Ecole des Beaux-Arts. He received a scholarship from the city of Cambrai in 1869, and he joined the workshop of Pierre-Jules Cavelier.

His teacher gave him a rigorously academic education. The Franco-Prussian War of 1870 interrupted his studies. Exempt from military service, he went to his parents' home, and then joined the volunteers of Montrouge. He had his baptism of fire at the advanced posts of Bagneux and at Buzenval in Rueil-Malmaison, where he saw the Orientalist painter Henri Regnault fall. He himself received three shots and narrowly avoided the loss of his right arm. He saw the horrors of the Commune, and left in search of new horizons. With a pistol and fifteen francs, he left for Spain, which he explored on foot for six months. On the way he worked for road masons. Back in Paris he joined the workshop of François Jouffroy, then entered the Académie Julian in the workshop of Henri Chapu where he found his friend from Valenciennes, Léon Fagel.

=== Career ===
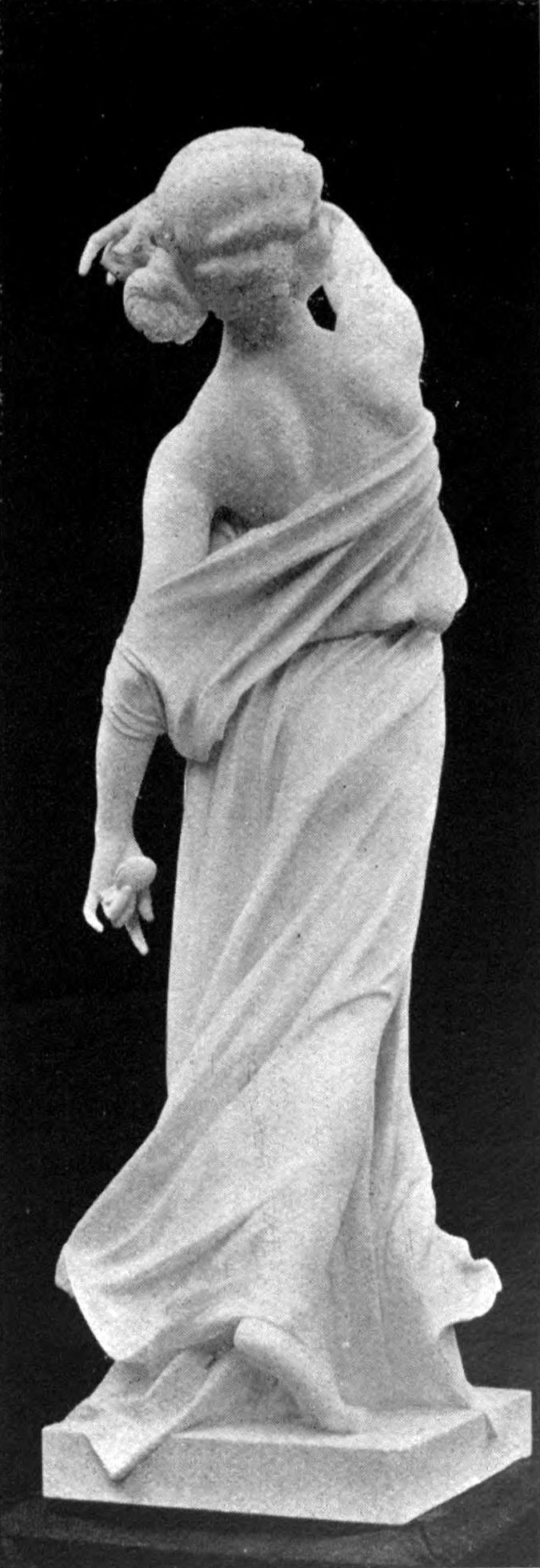
La Danse Profane

In 1874 he exhibited for the first time at the Salon, and exhibited there in all subsequent years. As a token of gratitude, he donated his first major work to the city of Cambrai. It was the stone statue of Cambrai chronicler Enguerrand de Monstrelet which he created in 1876 and was erected in a public garden. In 1877, he erected a statue of the Resurrection on the tomb of his parents in the cemetery of Père Lachaise. This work was a copy of a monument commissioned from him for a tomb in America. (Note: The original work was vandalized by criminals trying to steal it on the night of Friday to Saturday 31 January 2009, the day when employees found it partly mutilated, probably from falling since the vandals could not handle its weight. The pieces were placed in the secure reserve of the cemetery.)

He exhibited Gilliat Struggling with the Octopus, which earned him a second prize at the Salon of 1879, and Before the Stone Age, which earned him a scholarship to travel and visit Italy in 1881. In Florence he modeled the outline of The Blind and the Paralytic for which he was awarded the first medal of the Salon of 1883.

In 1889 after winning his gold medal at the Exposition Universelle in Paris, he decided to transform his Gilliat, which he exhibited at the Salon of 1890. His work was purchased by the state for the Musée du Luxembourg. He became a member of the Jury of the Salon of French Artists, where he revised the regulations. That same year, his application for a work of sculpture was dismissed on the ground that in 1889 a statue had been bought at the Salon for the sum of 10,000 francs. A new application in 1894 received the same answer.

At the end of the 19th century the city of Condé-sur-l'Escaut pre-selected him, as well as Léonie Duquesnoy and Jules Louis Mabille, to create the monument to the memory of actress Claire Josèphe Leris de Latude, a native of this town. In the end it was Henri Désiré Gauquié who did the work. He sculpted feminine grace with his masterpiece The Mirror, shown at the Exposition Universelle of 1900. This statue represented Chrysis from the novel Aphrodite by Pierre Louÿs. We do not know what action was taken on his application for a work of sculpture for the Universal Exposition of 1900, made in 1898.

In 1904 a subscription was launched worldwide for the realization of a great monument to Vilmorin, erected in 1908 in a square in Paris. This monument was in several pieces, three of which are now in the André Malraux Cultural Center of Verrières-le-Buisson: an allegory of agriculture and horticulture called Girl with Flowers and two others also in white marble. The second statue is located in the grounds of the Leon Maugé nursing home. It is missing the right wrist. The third, "Child Winnowing", signed and dated 1908, is in a small square at the corner of the Market passage and the Jean Simonin alley. The young child holds a wicker winnow in his hands. In 1908, after the showing of the monument to the Salon of French Artists, the author asked for it to be temporarily held in the Marble Depot.

In 1913 the Beaux Arts asked the artist to remove the monument. In 1917 he asked for instructions, and applied to place this monument to Vilmorin in a garden or a public place. The work was commissioned from the artist by a committee, so the state could not intervene in its disposal. This is probably the reason why the work was dismantled into several pieces.

He was called to Algiers in 1912 to reproduce the features of the Duc des Cars, General of the Conquest of 1830, and also make the medallion of General Maurice Bailloud, the successor to the previous conqueror, to create a bronze plaque placed on the 50-meter-high (160-foot) obelisk commemorating the dead of the Army of Africa, perched on the heights high on the Emperor Fort, inaugurated by the Governor General of Algeria Charles Lutaud, dated 21 October 1912, and destroyed by explosives for the safety of the inhabitants of Algiers in 1943.

=== Last years ===
When World War I broke out, he devoted himself assisting refugees from the North, and as president of the Friends of Cambrai, he devoted himself during the four years of conflict with his friend Devignes to help people of that town. In 1916, Senator Paul Bersez thanked the Minister of Fine Arts for the purchase of a work by the artist. In 1918 Carlier asked of the Minister of Fine Arts the position of Inspector of Fine Arts, and informed him that the bronze statues placed in the garden of Cambrai had been removed by the Germans. For Condé-sur-l'Escaut, he made the statue of General Léon de Poilloüe de Saint-Mars, a French Major General. (Note: A model of the statue is kept in the museum of Cambrai.) He collaborated with the architect Castex on a monumental fountain project for the city of Reims, and sat on the Committee for Reconstruction of Cambrai and participated in other Cambrésien causes.

He died in Paris on 11 April 1927. The funeral eulogy was spoken by the poet Devignes, A. Dorchain, the Mayor of Cambrai G. Desjardins. Fernand Créteur wrote his biography. He is buried in the Père Lachaise Cemetery.

After his death, during the distribution of works of the Musée du Luxembourg, it was recommended that the Gilliat marble be exhibited at the Louvre. The commission declined but offered the alternatives of the Natural History Museum or the Oceanographic Institute. (Note: We do not know what decision was made.)

== Works ==
This is a non-exhaustive list.

- 1872 v – Winter – marble sculpture, SD, E. Carlier 1872 Dimensions: 86.3 cm (sale USA, Dania Beach, Florida 20 May 2009 and Christie United Kingdom, London Auction 25 September, *2007 Lot 112 from Christie London 29 January 1987.
- 1874 – exhibited at three busts, including the historian Latherne.
- 1876 ??- The Resurrection – the tomb of his parents at Pere Lachaise Cemetery bronze group representing Saint-Michel taking the soul of the deceased.
- 1878 – Brotherhood – bronze group 5000fr grant for acquisition for a public park in Cambrai.
- 1879 – Gilliat – awarded a 2 e medal at the Salon of the same year. Transformed into marble in 1889. The plaster was acquired by the state and is at the Museum of Valenciennes. The bronze by Alexis Rudier for the city of Cambrai, is shown in the Salon of 1880.
- 1880 v – Young woman – red brown patinated bronze and brown dimensions: × × (Denise sale 1731 Friday, 22 June 1990 Auctions London, England)
- 1880 – Before the Stone Age – (Musee de Cambrai) plaster group, hunting scene, wolf, exhibited at the Salon of French Artist 19 & Gilliat and Octopus, bronze Alexis Rudier placed in the garden of flowers city ??(Musee de Cambrai), Salon of 1881.
- 1881 – 1890 Caryatids – purchase of two caryatids stone. (AN between these two dates, user AR405095, cote F/21/210 Ministry of Culture database Arcade R.71) Plaster model of Madame Roland purchased by the State.
- 1881 – Julien – portrait bust of the Emperor Julian, cachat State.
- 1881 – A group of children and animals – bas-relief carved in marble, subject animal, purchase state.
- 1882 v – a mansion Sculptures by Lucien Magne, Avenue de Villiers, photographed by Hervé Lewandowski. NMR
- 1883 – The Blind and the Paralytic – outlined in Florence ( 1 st medal at the Salon of 1883). Plaster exposed to the Friends of the Arts Exhibition of Cambrai n o 30 of the catalog.
- 1887 – Adolphe Jullien – engineer, marble bust for the School of Bridges and Roads, photo of G. Michelez (Ministry of Culture, Record: ARC00951, based Archimedes, Cote F/21 / * :7657). The plaster was acquired in 1889 for the Municipal Museum of Dijon
- 1888 – Natural History – for La Sorbonne façade rue des Ecoles
- 1889 – Berlioz – portrait bust of the composer, purchase of State for the Paris Opera. Plaster at the City Museum of Grenoble in Isere. Bust exposed to retrospective of 1928, organized by the Friends of the Arts of Cambrai, n o 10 of the catalog.
- 1890 – Gilliat and Octopus – marble SD.inscription EJ Thornton Cambrai 1890 (SD back the rock) Sun: 220 cm × 120 cm × 83 cm H Base: 8 cm (Property of the State Museum d'Orsay, inv No.: RF3911; LUX16; assignment: Louvre Museum, Dept. of Sculpture; deposited Villeurbanne, Nautical Center, Paris Musée du Luxembourg from 1890 to 1931). Molding workshop will be conducted by the National Museums in 1894. (Marbre. Exhibited at the Salon des Amis des Arts de Cambrai in 1928, n o 1 of catalog). An allocation request no further action had been formulated by the Musée de Picardie in Amiens in 1890.
- 1891 – Victor Massé – plaster bust of the composer (Musée de Lorient) purchase for the Paris Opera
- 1899 – Day & Night -. Caryatids Clock of City Hall Tours paired limestone, cut dimensions are not taken, on the terrace J. Carlier 1901.
- 1900 v. Music – and – Danse profane -; dimensions: 2.25 m × 0.75 m × 0.70 m, the original model acquired by the State for 3000fr (Palais de l'Elysée ), plaster exposed to the retrospective organized by the Friends of the Arts of Cambrai in 1928, n o 26 & 25 of the catalog. Deposit marbles n o 1724 the completion of plaster and n o 1870 the realization of marble Municipal Theatre Condom, Gers. The Danse Profane be made ??of marble, size: 227 cm × 75 cm × 65 cm marble deposit n o 1884 1903 acquisition for $ 7000fr for the gardens of the Palais de l'Elysée during the making of the Sacred Dance controlled Ernest Guilbert, then Victor Ségoffin allocated in 1904, donated the marble deposit then attributed to the Musée d'Aurillac 1921.
- 1902 – The Mirror – marble statue deposit at the Musée d'Arras, the statue is broken by the movers after exposure to the Exposition Universelle of 1900, missing feet and then the mirror is restored statue (marble and bronze), it has been a deposit Marbles (n o 1800) and the cost was 14,000fr. Marble, exposed to the Friends of the Arts Exhibition of Cambrai in 1928. deposit at the Museum of Cambrai in 1902.
- 1904 – Gilliat and Octopus – bronze with green patina, signed and dated 1904 with Carlier Rudier Foundry, Paris, (Sotheby's, USA, 2005, lot 123. Provient Collection M me Virginia Kraft Payson), plaster, museum Municipal Saint-Claude, Jura.
- 1904 – Dogue Beef and Kid – assignment Museum of St Claude
- 1906 v Vilmorin Monument – white marble to be erected in 1908 in a Parisian square and now dismantled, three statues are found in André Malraux Cultural Center of Verrières-le-Buisson .
- 1908 – Gilliat and Octopus – reduction in marble for the London exhibition and reductions were edited by F. Costenoble of 80 cm in height. Exposed to the Friends of the Arts Exhibition of Cambrai in 1928, catalog number 21.
- 1909 – Standing Bather – marble exhibited at the Salon of French Artists in 1909, FA Vizzavona photo.
- 1910 – Nausicaa – marble statue size (Petit Palais ). Marble was exhibited at the Exposition des Amis des Arts de Cambrai in 1928 (n o 6) and a terracotta same (n o 33) Catalog
- 1912 – Youth – marble, dimensions: 200 cm × 60 cm × 60 cm, allegory individual plaster statue order of 1909 deposit marbles n o 2455, purchased 2500fr, the artist's request translation marble exposed at the Salon of French Artists in 1912 and retrospective organized by the Friends of the Arts of Cambrai in 1928, n o 4 Catalogue Diana the Huntress
- 1912 – Amedeo Perusse des Cars – Maurice Bailloud General (inset) for the Monument to the Dead Army Africa in Algiers (Algiers trip). inaugurated on 21 October 1912 and destroyed in 1943, willfully safety. The medallion of General Bailloud was exposed to the 1928 retrospective organized by the Friends of the Arts of Cambrai, n o 20 of the catalog.
- 1913 – The Wave – bronze, exhibited at the retrospective, organized by the Arts Amios Cambrai, n o 22 of the catalog.
- 1913 – Henri Poincaré – bronze bust on a granite base from the Vosges, in the square of the School of Nancy, bordering the rue Gambetta, directed by subscription of his former students, colleges Colmar, Metz, Nancy and Strasbourg.
- 1914 – The Dancer with veil, terracotta Exposition exposed to the Friends of the Arts of Cambrai in 1928, n o 43 of the exhibition catalog. – & – Pannyre gold heels inspired by the poetry of Albert Samain Plaster exposed to the Exposition des Amis des Arts de Cambrai n o 28. Marble was made ??and exhibited at the Salon of 1914, photo by Antoine François Vizzavona.
- 1914 – Bather – or – Ondine – marble statuette, size: 53 cm × 34 cm × 28 cm; purchase of the State 1916 3000fr, marble deposit n o 2803 National furniture, exposed to the retrospective of 1928, n o 7 of the catalog. Assigned to Commander apartment Fequant.
- 1918 v The widow and her child – terracotta study, exhibited at the retrospective exhibition organized by the Friends of the Arts of Cambrai in 1928, n o 40 of the catalog.
- 1918 v – Woman and Child – Bronze, size: 41 cm × × signed on the base (sold Prunier, France 1991).
- 1918 v – The Journey – Scottish soldier, weapon feet, test patinated bronze brown, cast iron old edition, Signed on the terrace dimensions: 20.5 cm . (Sale France 2010)
- 1919 – Cambrai anxious – terracotta, exposed to the retrospective exhibition of the artist by the Friends of the Arts of Cambrai, n o 41 catalog.
- 1919 – Georges Clemenceau – the artist creates a project of the monument to the committee's request and the request command no further action. The bust will be exposed to the retrospective in 1928, organized by the Friends of the Arts of Cambrai n o 11 of the catalog.
- 1920 v – Edmond Garin – Mayor of Cambrai from 1919 to 1925 his bronze medallion, found its place on a monument to the glory of the mayor after his death. The medallion was exposed to the retrospective exhibition of the artist organized by the Friends of the Arts of Cambrai in 1928 and carries the catalog of this exhibition NO: 16.
- 1920 v – Human Archer – bronze spelter-patiented ivoir color, mounted on a black marble and green, metal nickel, Signed at the base dimensions: 45.1 cm × 21 cm × 6.5 cm, weight: 14 kg (for sale on the net in 2011)
- 1926 – The Rebel – terracotta exhibited at the Salon of French Artists from 1926 and at the Exposition des Amis des Arts de Cambrai in 1928, n o 42 to the catalog of this exhibition.

Undated

- The father and mother Carlier – marble busts exposed to the retrospective organized by the Friends of the Arts of Cambrai in 1928, n o 9 of the catalog.
- Ferdinand Charles Léon de Lasteyrie – Comte, archaeologist was bust (between 1881 and 1890) purchase of the State. Collection of the Institut de France
- Le Petit Destroyer – marble exposed to the retrospective organized by The Friends of the Arts of Cambrai, n o 5 of the catalog.
- Sculptures on the facade of the building at 40 Avenue Ledru-Rollin in Paris
- Poilloüe Léon de Saint-Mars – Statue of General (1832–1897), (Condé-sur-Escaut)
- La Brise – marble exposed to the Friends of the Arts Exhibition of Cambrai in 1928. (n o 3)

== Prizes and medals ==
- 1879 – Second Medal of the Salon for Gilliat
- 1883 – First medal of the Salon for L'Aveugle et le Paralytique
- 1883 – Grand Prix d'Amsterdam
- 1885 – Grand Prix de l'Exposition d'Anvers
- 1889 – Gold medal at the Exposition Universelle de Paris

== Decorations ==
- 1885 – Chevalier de la Légion d'honneur
- 1910 – Officier de la Légion d'honneur, in May, for promotion of fine arts at the London Exposition

== Salons, expositions ==
- 1874 – Salon first exhibition with three busts, including the historian Latherne. There expose every year.
- 1879 – Living; " Gilliat struggling with the octopus "Statue based on the novel by Victor Hugo: The Toilers of the Sea, which earned him two e medal at the Salon, n o 4852 the catalog price of the work paid by 2500fr Valenciennes Museum 33. Acquired by the city of Cambrai in 1882 with two paintings by Delacroix and miscellaneous 20,000 francs 34.
- 1881 – Salon of French Artists at the Palais des Champs-Élysées " Before the Stone Age, "plaster group, n o 3699 catalog of the Salon Photo: G. Michelez, the author gives a standout travel grant (Musee de Cambrai) – plaster statue at the foot of Madame Roland, purchase of state
- 1883 – Exhibition " The Blind and the Paralytic "( 1 st Medal)
- 1883 – Amsterdam Exposition (Grand Prix
- 1885 – Fair & Exposition Antwerp (Grand Jury Prize)
- 1886 – Exhibition " The Family "(Museum of Fine Arts in Arras)
- 1887 – Exhibition, Palais des Champs-Élysées " Madame Roland, "the marble statue will be acquired at the Salon of 1893, for the House Education Legion of Honor in Saint-Denis, the plaster cast of this work will be awarded at the Museum of Autun- Family plaster group n o 3734 catalog – Adolphe Jullien, marble bust standout for the School of Bridges and Roads.
- 1888 – Exhibition " Natural History "to the Sorbonne
- 1889 – Exposition Universelle de Paris receives a Gold Medal.
- 1890 – Salon of French Artists : Gilliat and Octopus, marble acquisition of State, No.: 3629, Catalogue of Salon 35. Attributed to the Musée de Picardie in Amiens in the Somme 36.
- 1893 – Salon of French Artists, Palais de l'Industrie in the Champs Elysees: Madame Roland n o 2667 catalog, marble statue purchased for home education of Saint-Denis 37. Presented at the Salon Hors Concours.
- 1897 – Exhibition of French Artists: The Mirror won the first round of voting for the Great Exhibition Medal of Honor.
- 1900 – 1900 Universal Exhibition in Paris: The Mirror marble and bronze marble statue is broken by the handlers of the exhibition.
- 1908 – Exhibition of French Artists: Monument to Vilmorin (City of Verrières-le-Buisson )
- 1909 – Exhibition of French Artists: Standing Bather, statue in marble.
- 1910 – Brussels Expo : Nausicaa, marble size, exhibited at the Salon d'Honneur in the art section.
- 1910 – Exhibition in London
- 1912 – Exhibition of French Artists: Youth marble, photo FA Vizzavona
- 1926 – Exhibition of French Artists: The Rebel, terracotta
- 1928 – 2nd Exhibition Friends of Arts devoted to Cambrai: A Retrospective of Works of Statuary E; Jh. Carlier.du 15 January to 15 February
- 1928 – Grand Palais (Paris), a retrospective exhibition of the work of the sculptor

== Museums and monuments ==
- Père Lachaise Cemetery: "La Résurrection"
- Musée de Cambrai: "Avant l'Age de Pierre" plâtre dépôt n°:NO.177(1882 attribution)- "Léon de Poilloüe de Saint-Mars", maquette de la statue.
- Musée des beaux-arts d'Arras: musée détruit en 1915 "La Famille" – "Le Miroir" don du plâtre 1897
- La Sorbonne: "Histoire Naturelle"
- Museum: bas relief d'animaux
- Musée du Luxembourg: "Gilliat", statue en marbre de 1889
- Hôtel de Ville de Tours: "Le Jour" & "La Nuit"; Cariatides encadrant l'Horloge. (1899)
- Élysée Palace: "La Musique et la Danse profane" marbre, (v.1900)
- Petit Palais des Champs-Élysées: "Nausicaa", (marbre, 1910)
- Maison d'éducation de la Légion d'honneur in Saint-Denis: "Madame Roland"
- Centre Culturel André Malraux, à Verrières-le-Buisson, trois statues en marbre blanc du Monument Vilmorin.(1904–1908), don't: "Jeune fille aux fleurs"- "Enfant vanant" – "Allégorie de l'Horticulture".
- Musée du Louvre: "Gilliat et la Pieuvre", département des Sculptures, en dépôt à Villeurbanne, au Centre Nautique.
- Musée de Lorient, (Morbihan): " Victor Massé", plâtre du buste du compositeur de musique.
- Condé-sur-Escaut: Statue du Général "Léon de Poilloüe de Saint-Mars".
- Institut de France: Buste du Comte "Ferdinand Charles Léon de Lasteyrie", (1810–1879), archéologue
- Opéra de Paris: "Victor Massé" – "Berlioz".
- Museum of Grenoble, Isère: "Berlioz", buste en plâtre, 1891.
- Nancy, statue en bronze de "Henri Poincaré" sur un socle en granit des Vosges, offerte par souscription de ses anciens élèves des lycées de Colmar, Metz, Nancy et Strasbourg. érigée en 1913.
- Algiers sur les hauteurs du Fort l'Empereur, plaque de bronze posé sur l'obélisque du Monuments aux Morts de l'Armée d'Afrique, érigé le 21 et détruit volontairement pour la sécurité en 1943.
- Musée de Saint-Claude, plâtre Dogue, Loup et Agneau, -Dogue, Bœuf et Chevreau -attribution de 1904.
- Musée Galliera; On veille tête, prêtée pour l'exposition rétrospective du Grand Palais en 1928.
- Musée Rolin à Autun, moulage en plâtre de Madame Roland, remis en 1896.
- Musée d'art et d'archéologie d'Aurillac, Cantal; La Danse Profane, allégorie en marbre des arts, des sciences et des techniques attribuée au Musée d'Aurillac dans le Cantal.
- théâtre municipal de Condom, Gers; La Danse Profane.
- Musée des Beaux-Arts de Dijon; L'Ingénieur Adolphe Jullien, attribution de 1889, buste en plâtre.
- Musée des beaux-arts de Valenciennes; Gilliat, attribution du moulage en plâtre original, en 1880.Œuvre ayant value à l'artiste une médaille au Salon.

== Iconography ==
- Chartran: E. Carlier, portrait peint à Rome, HST
- Guillot: Emile Carlier, portrait, HST peinte à Rome
- Buret: Carlier, portrait, HST peint à Rome
- Aubert: Emile Joseph Carlier, portrait réalisé à Rome, HST.
- Paul Petit: Emile Joseph Carlier dans son atelier – Croquis d'atelier
- Paul Petit: Emile Joseph Nestor Carlier, portrait de profil, dessin au crayon.
- Alphonse Eugène Lechevrel: Emile Joseph Carlier, 1897, portrait de l'artiste de profil, plaquette uniface en cuivre, cuivre, galvanoplastie, métal, dimensions : 5 by 3.7 centimetres (2.0 by 1.5 in), Musée d'Orsay
- 1894 – Auguste Moreau-Deschanvres, (1838–1913): Portrait d'Emile Joseph Carlier; HST; SDbg; dimensions : 82 by 65 centimetres (32 by 26 in), represented sitting, à mi-corps de face avec des lunettes, moustache, bras croisé, Valenciennes Musée des Beaux arts.
