= Bluebeard (1951 film) =

1951 film

- Directed by: Christian-Jaque
- Written by: Boris von Borresholm; Erich Kröhnke; Hans Rehfisch
- Based on: "Bluebeard"
- Starring: Hans Albers; Cécile Aubry; Fritz Kortner; Lina Carstens
- Cinematography: Christian Matras
- Music by: Werner Eisbrenner
- Production companies: Alcina (Paris); Union-Film AG (Zürich); Ala-Film GmbH (München)
- Release date: 1951
- Running time: 95 minutes
- Countries: France; Switzerland; West Germany
- Language: German

Bluebeard (German: Blaubart) is a 1951 black comedy film directed by Christian-Jaque and starring Hans Albers, Cécile Aubry and Fritz Kortner. Based on Charles Perrault’s fairy tale Bluebeard, it was a co-production between France, Switzerland and West Germany. The film reworks the tale in comic form. It was made in separate German- and French-language versions, with the French version released as Barbe-Bleue.

== Synopsis ==
Based on Charles Perrault’s Bluebeard, the film follows Count von Salvers, who forbids each of his wives to enter a locked chamber while he is away. In this version of the story, the tale is given a comic reversal: when his seventh wife enters the forbidden room, she finds his previous wives alive and confined there.

== Cast ==
The cast includes:

- Hans Albers as Blaubart
- Cécile Aubry as Aline
- Fritz Kortner as Haushofsmeister
- Lina Carstens as Amme
- Arno Paulsen as Matthes
- Jacques Sernas as Florian
- Ina Halley as Anna
- Henri Rollan as Freiherr d'Etioles
- Denise Cormand as Valentine d'Etioles
- Carl Wery as Herzog

== Production ==
The film was made in separate German- and French-language versions, both directed by Christian Jaque. Cécile Aubry received intensive German-language coaching so that she could appear in both versions. Hans Albers played Bluebeard in the German version, while Pierre Brasseur took the title role in the French version. Part of the filming took place in Thiersee in Austria, where the Pirchmoser farm was remodelled as a late medieval setting for the production. The Swiss company Rexfilm also contributed to the project. The combined production costs were reported at about 2 million Deutsche Marks.

== Release and reception ==
The French-language version released as Barbe-Bleue. In a 1951 review, Der Spiegel described the film as a mix of fairy-tale parody and historical horror, and highlighted the performances of Hans Albers, Cécile Aubry and Fritz Kortner.

== Bibliography ==
- Zipes, Jack. The Enchanted Screen: The Unknown History of Fairy-Tale Films. Routledge, 2011.
