= Belle and Sebastian (1965 TV series) =

French television series

- Genre: Children
- Created by: Cécile Aubry
- Starring: Mehdi El Glaoui (credited as Pierre Medhi); Edmund Beauchamp; Jean-Michel Audin; Dominique Blondeau; Paloma Matta; Hélène Dieudonné
- Composer: David White
- Original language: French
- No. of seasons: 1
- No. of episodes: 13

Production
- Executive producer: Étienne Laroche
- Running time: 25 minutes
- Production company: Gaumont France

Original release
- Network: ORTF
- Release: September 26, 1965

Belle and Sebastian is a 1965 French television children's serial, based on the 1965 novel Belle et Sébastien by Cécile Aubry published the same year. It was 13 episodes long and starred Aubry's son Mehdi El Glaoui as Sebastien, whilst Aubry appeared as the episode host and co-directed episodes with Jean Guillaume.

== Synopsis ==
Six-year-old orphan boy Sebastian lives with his six-year-old Pyrenean Mountain dog Belle and with the villagers of Belvédère, in the French Alps.

== Production ==
It was filmed as a live-action show in black-and-white in France under its original name in 1965. In 1967 it was dubbed and the title was anglicized. It first appeared in the UK on BBC1 on Monday afternoons, running from 2 October 1967 to 1 January 1968. Shown in the time slot after Blue Peter, it was repeated several times and became an important ingredient of school holiday television. Filmed in and around the village of Belvédère in Alpes-Maritimes, its combination of authentic locations, sensitive writing, and winning performances by the actors, makes it an enduring classic. Its deep theme is the power and importance of love. The part of Sebastian was played by Mehdi El Glaoui, Cécile Aubry's son from her marriage to Si Brahim El Glaoui, the eldest son of Thami El Glaoui, the Pasha of Marrakesh, whom she met in 1950 while filming The Black Rose.

== Legacy ==
The serial spawned two further 13-part colour film sequels Sébastien parmi les hommes ("Sebastian Among Men") (1968) retitled Belle, Sebastian and the Horses by the BBC and Sébastien et la Mary-Morgane ("Sebastian and the Mary Morgan") (1970) which was not broadcast by the BBC.

The Scottish indie pop band Belle and Sebastian took their name from the TV series.

== Cast ==
- Flanker the dog as Belle
- Mehdi El Glaoui [credited as Pierre Medhi] as Sebastien
- Edmond Beauchamp as Cesar
- Jean-Michel Audin as Doctor Guillaume
- Dominique Blondeau as Jean
- Paloma Palma [credited as Paloma Matta] as Angelina
- Hélène Dieudonné as Celestine
