= Milena (film) =

- Directed by: Véra Belmont
- Starring: Valérie Kaprisky; Stacy Keach
- Release date: 9 January 1991
- Running time: 2h 19min
- Country: France
- Language: English

Milena is a 1991 French biographical film about Czech writer Milena Jesenská.

== Cast ==
- Valérie Kaprisky - Milena Jesenska
- Stacy Keach - Jesenski
- Gudrun Landgrebe - Olga
- Nick Mancuso - Jaromir
- Peter Gallagher - Pollak
- Yves Jacques - Max Brod
- Jacques Penot - Simon Foreman
- Jeanne Marine - Lisa
- Philip Anglim - Kafka
