= Catherine & Co. =

1975 film directed by Michel Boisrond

- French theatrical release poster
- Directed by: Michel Boisrond
- Screenplay by: Catherine Breillat; Léo L. Fuchs
- Based on: Catherine and Co. by Edouard de Segonzac
- Produced by: Léo L. Fuchs
- Starring: Jane Birkin; Patrick Dewaere; Jean-Pierre Aumont; Vittorio Caprioli; Jean-Claude Brialy; Nathalie Courval; Mehdi; Henri Garcin
- Cinematography: Richard Suzuki
- Edited by: Jacques Witta
- Music by: Vladimir Cosma
- Production companies: Viaduc Productions; Produzione Intercontinentale Cinematografica
- Distributed by: Warner-Columbia Film (France)
- Release date: 29 October 1975 (France)
- Running time: 100 minutes
- Countries: France; Italy
- Language: French

Catherine & Co. (French: Catherine et Cie) is a 1975 French sex comedy film directed by Michel Boisrond from a screenplay by Catherine Breillat and Léo L. Fuchs, based on the 1967 novel Catherine and Co. by Edouard de Segonzac. The film stars Jane Birkin, Patrick Dewaere, Jean-Pierre Aumont, Vittorio Caprioli and Jean-Claude Brialy.

== Plot ==
Catherine is a young British prostitute who decides to make money living in Paris. After learning about corporate practices and business ins and outs from her clients, she decides to incorporate as an official escort business. Searching for people to invest in her scheme, she encounters both interest and setbacks.

== Cast ==
- Jane Birkin as Catherine
- Patrick Dewaere as François
- Jean-Pierre Aumont as Marquis Puisargue
- Vittorio Caprioli as Moretti
- Jean-Claude Brialy as Guillaume
- Mehdi El Glaoui as Thomas
- Henri Garcin as Robert Grandin
- Dora Doll as Catherine's mother
- Hélène Duc
- Jacques Legras as the gentleman
- Jacques Marin as car rental agency owner
- Bernard Musson Cartier watch salesman
- Nathalie Courval as Mauve
- Jacques Rosny as Jean-Pierre
- Jean Barney as Bernard
- Robert Favart
- Alexandra Delli Colli as Osmane
- Carlo Nell as Duguet
- Maurice Travail as driver's license official

== Reception ==
On the film's initial US release in February 1976, Richard Eder of The New York Times described the film as a "sex farce", "sloppy, ill-shaped and very familiar", but with an air of sincerity that allowed the audience to enjoy its positive attributes. Eder particularly praised the acting of Vittorio Caprioli as an Italian businessman who is one of the protagonist's lovers. On the other hand, John Simon's review for New York described Birkin as "a nasty baggage" and the film as "the most offensive dungheap masquerading as a movie to be seen in years, perhaps ever." In a review for Time Out, Geoff Brown said the film was "not hot enough to be a sexploiter, but not sophisticated enough to be anything better".

In a 2012 retrospective article about Birkin's films, Australian critic Simon Foster called Catherine & Co. "one of the key films in Birkin's extensive filmography to take advantage of her sexuality at the height of her fame".
