= Thomas B. Costain =

Canadian writer (1885–1965)

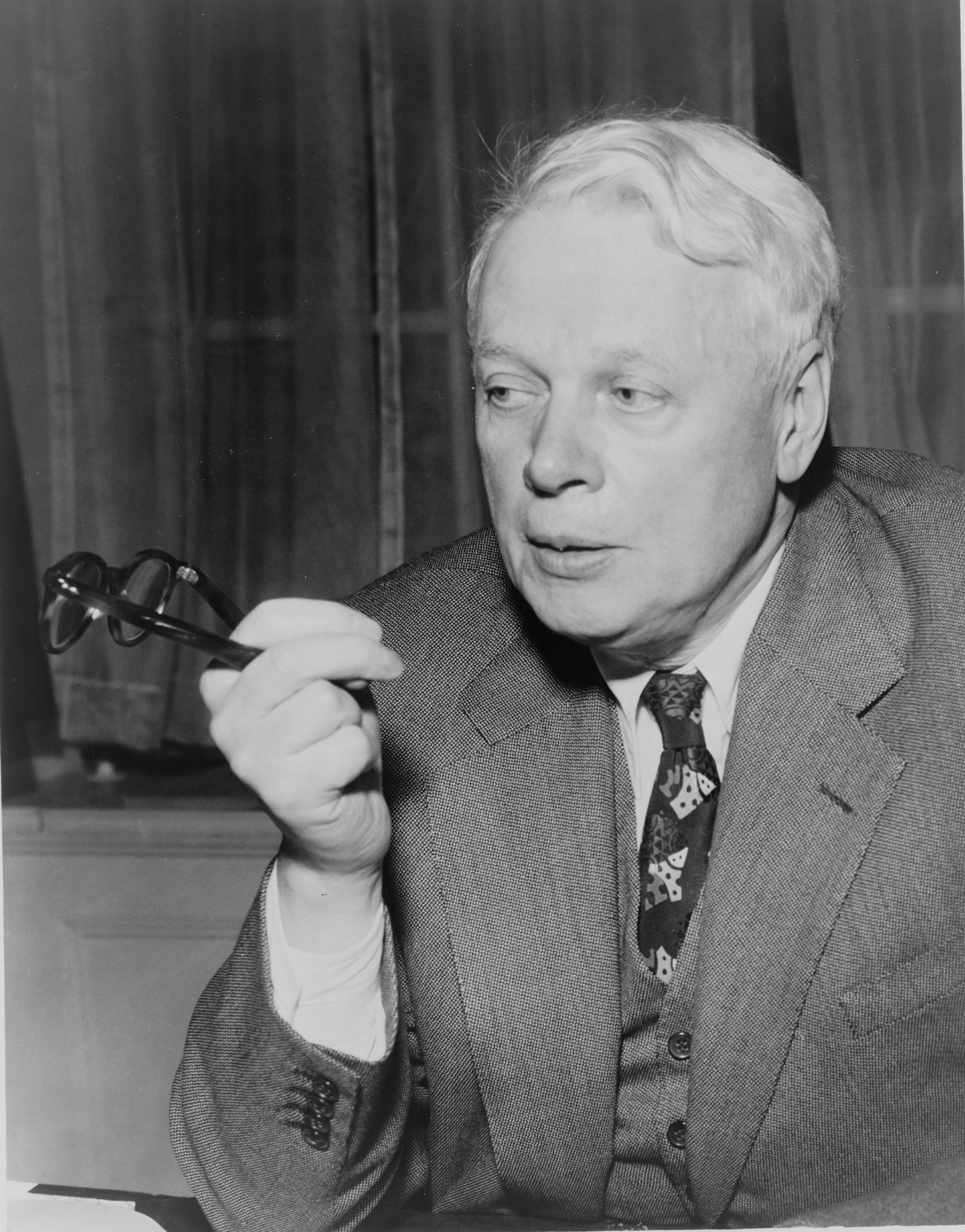
- Costain in 1954
- Born: May 8, 1885; Brantford, Ontario
- Died: October 8, 1965 (aged 80); New York, New York
- Education: Brantford Collegiate Institute
- Occupations: Journalist, author
- Spouse: Ida Randolph Spragge
- Children: Molly; Dora
- Writing career
- Genre: Historical fiction
- Notable awards: Doctor of Letters, University of Western Ontario; Gold medallion, Canadian Club of New York

Thomas Bertram Costain (May 8, 1885 – October 8, 1965) was a Canadian-American journalist who became a best-selling author of historical novels at the age of 57.

== Life ==
Costain was born in Brantford, Ontario to John Herbert Costain and Mary Schultz. He attended high school there at the Brantford Collegiate Institute. Before graduating from high school, he had written four novels, one of which was a 70,000 word romance about Maurice of Nassau, Prince of Orange. These early novels were rejected by publishers.

His first writing success came in 1902 when the Brantford Courier accepted a mystery story from him, and he became a reporter there (for five dollars a week). He was an editor at the Guelph Daily Mercury between 1908 and 1910. He married Ida Randolph Spragge (1888–1975) in York Township, Ontario on January 12, 1910. The couple had two children, Molly (Mrs. Howard Haycraft) and Dora (Mrs. Henry Darlington Steinmetz). In 1910, Costain joined the Maclean Publishing Group where he edited three trade journals. Beginning in 1914, he was a staff writer for and, from 1917, editor of the Toronto-based Maclean's magazine. His success there brought him to the attention of The Saturday Evening Post in New York City where he was fiction editor for fourteen years.

In 1920, he became a naturalized U.S. citizen. He also worked for Doubleday Books as an editor 1939–1946. He was the head of 20th Century Fox's bureau of literary development (story department) from 1934 to 1942.

In 1940, he wrote four short novels but was "enough of an editor not to send them out". He next planned to write six books in a series he called "The Stepchildren of History". He would write about six interesting but unknown historical figures. For his first, he wrote about the seventeenth-century pirate John Ward aka Jack Ward. In 1942, he realized his longtime dream when this first novel For My Great Folly was published, and it became a bestseller with over 132,000 copies sold. The New York Times reviewer stated at the end of the review "there will be no romantic-adventure lover left unsatisfied." In January 1946, he "retired" to spend the rest of his life writing, at a rate of about 3,000 words a day.

Raised as a Baptist, he was reported in the 1953 Current Biography to be an attendant of the Protestant Episcopal Church. He was described as a handsome, tall, broad-shouldered man with a pink and white complexion, clear blue eyes, and a slight Canadian accent. He was white-haired by the time he began to write novels. He loved animals and could not even kill a bug (but he also loved bridge, and he did not extend the same policy to his partners). He also loved movies and the theatre (he met his future wife when she was performing Ruth in The Pirates of Penzance).

Costain's work is a mixture of commercial history (such as The White and The Gold, a history of New France to around 1720) and fiction that relies heavily on historic events (one review stated it was hard to tell where history leaves off and apocrypha begins). His most popular novel was The Black Rose (1945), centered in the time and actions of Bayan of the Baarin also known as Bayan of the Hundred Eyes. Costain noted in his foreword that he initially intended the book to be about Bayan and Edward I, but became caught up in the legend of Thomas Becket's parents: an English knight married to an Eastern girl. The book was a selection of the Literary Guild with a first printing of 650,000 copies and sold over two million copies in its first year. In 1950, it was made into a successful film starring Orson Welles as Bayan and Tyrone Power as Walter.

His research led him to believe that Richard III was a great monarch tarred by conspiracies, after his death, with the murder of the princes in the tower. Costain supported his theories with documentation, suggesting that the real murderer was Henry VII.

He also wrote four short stories for Ellery Queen's Mystery Magazine in the 1940s under the pseudonym Pat Hand. Three of the stories ("The Showdown," "The Imponderables," and "The Ace of Spades") feature gambler Careful Jones, who enjoys winning against rich men and has a Robin Hood streak.

Costain died in 1965 at his New York City home of a heart attack at the age of 80. He is buried in the Farringdon Independent Church Cemetery in Brantford.

== Awards and honours ==
He received a Doctor of Letters (D. Litt) degree from the University of Western Ontario in May 1952 and he received a gold medallion from the Canadian Club of New York in June 1965. The Thomas B. Costain public elementary school (1953) and the Thomas B. Costain – S.C. Johnson Community Centre (2002) in Brantford are named in his honour.

His daughter Molly Costain Haycraft became a writer of historical novels.

== Influence ==
George R. R. Martin has cited Costain's non-fiction books on the Plantagenet dynasty as an influence on his book Fire and Blood, part of Martin's "A Song of Ice and Fire" series.

== Publications ==
=== Novels ===
- For My Great Folly (1942)
- Joshua: Leader of a United People - A Realistic Biography (1943) - with Rogers MacVeagh
- Ride With Me (1944)
- The Black Rose (1945)
- The Moneyman (1947)
- High Towers (1949)
- Son of a Hundred Kings (1950)
- The Silver Chalice (1952)
- The Tontine (1955) illustrated by Herbert Ryman
- Below the Salt (1957)
- The Darkness And The Dawn (1959) (on Attila the Hun)
- The Last Love (1963)

=== Non-fiction ===
- The Conquerors: The Pageant of England (1949) The author's "First Work of History", later reissued as The Conquering Family
- The White and the Gold (1954)
- The Chord of Steel: The Story of the Invention of the Telephone (1960)
- William the Conqueror a Landmark book (1959)
- The Plantagenets series (also known as The Pageant of England)
  - The Conquering Family (1949)
  - The Magnificent Century (1951)
  - The Three Edwards (1958)
  - The Last Plantagenets (1962)

=== Short stories (as Pat Hand) ===
- "The Showdown." Ellery Queen's Mystery Magazine, Jan 1944. Repr. Rogues Gallery, ed. Ellery Queen (Little, Brown, 1945).
- "The Imponderables." Ellery Queen's Mystery Magazine, Jul 1944.
- "The Alibi." Ellery Queen's Mystery Magazine, Nov 1944.
- "The Ace of Spades." Ellery Queen's Mystery Magazine, Jan 1945. This also appears in Win, Lose or Die (Severn House, 1997) but is mislabeled as "The Showdown."

=== Other works ===
- Stories to Remember (1956) a selection of novels and short stories chosen by Costain and John Beecroft. First of 3 collections.
- More Stories to Remember (1958) with John Beecroft
- Thirty Stories (1961) with John Beecroft
- Come Read with Me (1965), a selection of short stories and novellas

== Films from his works ==
- The Black Rose (1950) starring Tyrone Power
- Son of a Hundred Kings (1950) CBC mini-series
- The Silver Chalice (1954) starring Paul Newman (film debut)
- The Chord of Steel (1960) CBC seven-episode mini-series aired in 1964

== See also ==
- Bell Homestead National Historic Site
