= Robert Fuest =

British film and television director (1927–2012)

- Born: 30 September 1927; Croydon, London, England
- Died: 21 March 2012 (aged 84); London, England
- Occupations: Film director; screenwriter; production designer; painter
- Notable work: The Avengers; The Abominable Dr. Phibes; Dr. Phibes Rises Again

Robert Fuest (30 September 1927 – 21 March 2012) was an English film and television director, screenwriter, production designer, and painter, who worked mostly in the horror, fantasy and suspense genres.

His notable works include The Abominable Dr. Phibes (1971), starring Vincent Price which was ranked by Time Out London as one of the 100 greatest horror films of all time, and its sequel Dr. Phibes Rises Again (1972). He was also known for his contributions to the television series The Avengers.

== Biography ==
Fuest was born in Croydon, south London. He graduated from Wimbledon School of Art with a national diploma in design and later studied for an art teacher diploma at Hornsey College of Art. During his national service in the Royal Air Force, he was involved in the Berlin Airlift of 1948. He subsequently taught illustration and lithography at Southampton School of Art for a decade.

In the early sixties, he designed sets for television programmes such as ITV Play of the Week and Armchair Theatre. It was whilst working on the first season of The Avengers for director Peter Hammond that Fuest developed an enthusiasm for directing. Fuest later admitted (on a DVD commentary for the Avengers episode "Game") that Hammond's visual style proved a major influence, and opened him up to the stylistic possibilities of film and TV.

In 1965, he contributed material to the Peter Cook and Dudley Moore comedy sketch show Not Only... But Also.

His first film was Just Like a Woman (1967), which he also wrote, starring Wendy Craig. His work on the film brought him to the attention of Avengers producer Albert Fennell, who offered him the chance to direct episodes; returning to the show, he directed seven episodes in total: "My Wildest Dream", "Game", "They Keep Killing Steed", "The Rotters", "Take Me to Your Leader", "Pandora" and "Take Over". When the series was later revived as The New Avengers, Fuest was invited back to direct two more episodes, namely "The Midas Touch" and "The Tale of the Big Why".

In further television work, Fuest handled productions on both sides of the Atlantic, including Revenge of the Stepford Wives, ABC Weekend Special, ABC Afterschool Specials, The Doombolt Chase, C.A.T.S. Eyes, Worlds Beyond and The Optimist

Fuest's later films feature strong black comedy elements, including cult favorites The Abominable Dr. Phibes (1971), Dr. Phibes Rises Again (1972) (which he co-wrote), and The Final Programme (also known as The Last Days of Man on Earth; 1973). In addition to directing The Final Programme, he also wrote the screenplay and designed the sets.

His other films include And Soon the Darkness (1970), a suspense thriller written by Avengers writers Brian Clemens and Terry Nation, and The Devil's Rain (1975), a horror film shot in Mexico. The latter movie received such scathing reviews it may have ended his career, as Fuest immediately thereafter found himself relegated to directing fairly anonymous television work. His only subsequent theatrical release was Aphrodite (1982), a softcore sex movie filmed in Greece.

During his retirement, he focused on his passion for painting (he had exhibited at the Royal Academy since 1951) and also lectured at the London International Film School.

== Selected filmography ==
- Just Like a Woman (1967)
- Wuthering Heights (1970)
- And Soon the Darkness (1970)
- The Abominable Dr. Phibes (1971)
- Dr. Phibes Rises Again (1972)
- The Final Programme (1973)
- The Devil's Rain (1975)
- Three Dangerous Ladies (1977)
- Revenge of the Stepford Wives (1980)
- The Big Stuffed Dog (1981)
- Aphrodite (1982)

== Bibliography ==
- Gerosa, Mario (2010). Robert Fuest e l'abominevole Dottor Phibes. Alessandria: Edizioni Falsopiano. ISBN 978-88-89782-13-2.
- Humphreys, Justin, with contributions by Mark Ferelli, Sam Irvin, and David Taylor (2018). The Dr. Phibes Companion. Albany, Georgia: BearManor Media. ISBN 978-1-62933-293-2.
