= Gregory Herpe =

French photographer and playwright

- Born: February 25, 1969 (age 57); Paris
- Years active: 1988–present
- Style: black and white
- Website: www.gregoryherpe.com

Gregory Herpe (born February 25, 1969, in Paris) is a French photographer, writer, playwright, and director.

== Biography ==
Gregory Herpe was born in Paris on February 25, 1969.

He began to take an interest in photography at the age of about 14 and took pictures of his friends at Père Lachaise Cemetery.

He first appeared on stage as an actor in 1989. In 1991, he acted in a film based on a work by Nikolai Gogol (Les Joueurs). During that period, Herpe made his mark in both theatre and cinema through various roles. However, starting in the early 1990s, he decided to embark on travels in order to pursue the art of photography, a field closer to his heart.

He worked as a journalist for various magazines in Paris and London, and later became an editor-in-chief at Sam Zniber, Fun Radio, and NRJ.

His style should primarily be characterized as Pop Art. At the same time, he re-engaged with the art of cinema, this time working as a unit still photographer on feature films.

The following year, at the request of former journalist Tina Kieffer, he traveled to Cambodia and produced a black-and-white report titled "All at School".

He has also taken portraits of many celebrities, such as Gérard Depardieu, David Bowie, Iggy Pop, Omar Sharif, Jack Nicholson, and Deep Purple. His photographs have been published in the press across many countries.

Subsequently, the "Deep into Drag Queen" photoshoot series — which is currently ongoing across Europe — was launched, starting in cities such as Amsterdam, Helsinki, Paris, and Baku. The project features artists such as Kristel Jongman, Jennifer Hoplez, and Lady Slim.

In 2021 and 2022, following the war between Armenia and Azerbaijan, he conducted several photoshoots in Karabakh.

=== Awards ===
- Honorable Mention — Moscow, Russia, 2016
- Best Press Photo Award (Club de la Presse LR) — Montpellier, France, 2015
- Genoa International Contemporary. Awarded in the Photography category at the Art Biennale, Genoa, Italy, 2015

== Publications ==
- A Coronew World (Photobook, Petit Hippocampe Editions, Netherlands, 2020)
- Odyssey (Exhibition catalogue, Saint-Cyprien Museum of Collections, 2017)
- Catalonia (Photobook, Literary Press Editions, 2015)
- Chorus of the Catalans (Book/Images CD, Art Passion Editions, 2011)
- Lord Byron, or the Immoral Life of a Poet (Theatre; Guy Boulianne Editions, Quebec, Canada, 2006)
- My World, Barbara (collection: A Night in Brocéliande), (Short story; Guy Boulianne Editions, Quebec, Canada, 2006)
- Poèmes & Haïku, published in the Canadian literary journals Haïku and Acacia (2006)
- My 10 Years with Pierre Pellegrini (Foreword; Guy Boulianne Editions, Quebec, Canada, 2006)
- Confutatis Maledictis (Collection: Tableau!), (Short story; Ixcéa Editions, 2005)
- The Deadly Pattern (Collection: Beliefs & Magic)
- (Short story; Ixcéa Editions, 2005)
- The Old Goat (Novel; Editions du Panthéon, 1996)
