= Souvenirs (song) =

1959 single by Barbara Evans with Mort Garson and his Orchestra

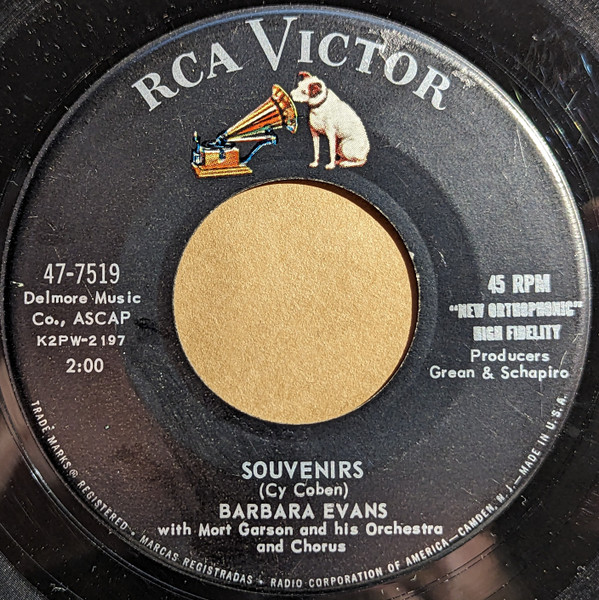

Single by Barbara Evans with Mort Garson and his Orchestra
- B-side: "Pray for Me Mother"
- Released: April 20, 1959
- Genre: Pop
- Length: 2:00
- Label: RCA Victor
- Songwriter(s): Cy Coben
- Producer(s): Charles Randolph Grean, Lee Schapiro

Barbara Evans singles chronology
| "I Could Cry" (1958) | "Souvenirs" (1959) | "A Little Girl Cried" (1959) |

Mort Garson singles chronology
| "Drum Tango" (1959) | "Souvenirs" (1959) | "A Little Girl Cried" (1959) |

"Souvenirs" is a song written by Cy Coben and originally recorded and released by American singer Barbara Evans backed by Canadian composer Mort Garson and his Orchestra, the song was released in April 1959. The song failed to chart, peaking at 111 in the Bubbling Under Hot 100 in June 1959. Two successful non-English covers would follow, such as in German by expatriate American singer Bill Ramsey in June of that same year (peaking at Number 1 in West Germany in September 1959), and the most successful in French by French singer Johnny Hallyday, released in June 1960.

== Track listing ==
7-inch single RCA Victor 47-7519 (US)

A. "Souvenirs" (2:00)
B. "Pray for Me Mother" (2:10)

== Bill Ramsey version (in German) ==
"Souvenirs"

Single by Bill Ramsey
- A-side: "Mach Keinen Heck-Meck"
- Released: June 15, 1959
- Recorded: June 8, 1959
- Genre: Schlager
- Length: 1:57
- Label: Polydor
- Songwriter(s): Cy Coben, Jonny Bartels

Bill Ramsey singles chronology
| "Wumba-Tumba Schokoladeneisverkäufer" (1959) | "Souvenirs" (1959) | "Hier Könn' Matrosen Vor Anker Geh'n " (1959) |

In the same year, the song was adapted into German by German poet Jonny Bartels. Sung by expatriate American Jazz singer Bill Ramsey as the b-side to "Mach Keinen Heck-Meck" ("Don't make a fuss") , it reached number one in West Germany in September 1959. The song was also released as a single in the US by Decca Records in February 1960 but failed to chart.

== Johnny Hallyday version (in French) ==
"Souvenirs, souvenirs"

Single by Johnny Hallyday

from the album Hello Johnny
- Released: June 3, 1960
- Genre: Rock'n'roll
- Length: 2:10
- Label: Disques Vogue
- Songwriter(s): Cy Coben, Fernand Bonifay
- Producer(s): Jacques Wolfsohn

Johnny Hallyday singles chronology
| "T'aimer follement" (1960) | "Souvenirs, souvenirs" (1960) | "Itsy bitsy petit bikini" (1960) |

Later the song was adapted into French by Fernand Bonifay. French singer Johnny Hallyday released it (under the title "Souvenirs, souvenirs") as an EP in June 1960 and would be featured on his debut album "Hello Johnny" later that year.

=== Track listing ===
7-inch EP Disques Vogue EPL 7755 (1960, France)

A1. "Souvenirs, souvenirs"
A2. "Pourquoi cet amour"
B1. "Je cherche une fille"
B2. "J'suis mordu"

"J'suis mordu" is a French adaptation of "I Got Stung"

=== Charts ===
| Chart (1960) | Peak position |
|---|---|
| Belgium (Ultratop 50 Wallonia) | 23 |
