= The Public Woman =

La femme publique
- Directed by: Andrzej Żuławski
- Written by: Dominique Garnier; Andrzej Żuławski
- Starring: Valérie Kaprisky; Francis Huster; Lambert Wilson; Patrick Bauchau
- Cinematography: Sacha Vierny
- Edited by: Marie-Sophie Dubus
- Music by: Alain Wisniak
- Distributed by: Hachette-Fox
- Release date: 16 May 1984
- Running time: 113 minutes
- Country: France
- Language: French

The Public Woman (French: La femme publique) is a 1984 French erotic drama film, directed by Andrzej Żuławski, starring Valérie Kaprisky, Lambert Wilson and Francis Huster. The film had a total of 1,302,425 admissions in France where it was the 28th-highest-grossing film of the year. The film being recorded inside the film is based on inspired by Fyodor Dostoevsky's 1872 novel Demons.

== Awards ==
=== César Awards, France, 1985 ===
Nominated

- Best Actress - Valérie Kaprisky
- Best Supporting Actor - Lambert Wilson
- Best Adaptation - Andrzej Żuławski and Dominique Garnier

=== Montréal World Film Festival 1984 ===
- Won Most Popular Film - Andrzej Żuławski
- Won Special Prize of the Jury - Andrzej Żuławski

== DVD releases ==
The film had its English-speaking debut on DVD in late 2008, when new label Mondo Vision released the film as its debut title. The disc features a commentary from Andrzej Żuławski and a video interview, where he discusses Polish cinema and the film's production. The film is also available on DVD, blu-ray and 4K from LCJ Editions in France, IVC in Japan, and Minerva Pictures in Italy, but lack these extras.

== Reception ==
Jeremiah Kipp of Slant Magazine gave the film four out of four stars. He praised the film's emotional intensity, camerawork, cinematography, and the main character's portrayal. Variety noted that Kaprisky "gives her all as the aspiring thesp without much personality" and praised the cinematography; however, the review pointed out that there was a "monstrous political plot that never is adequately explained" and that the film has "little method or meaning".
