= Valérie Kaprisky =

French actress (born 1962)

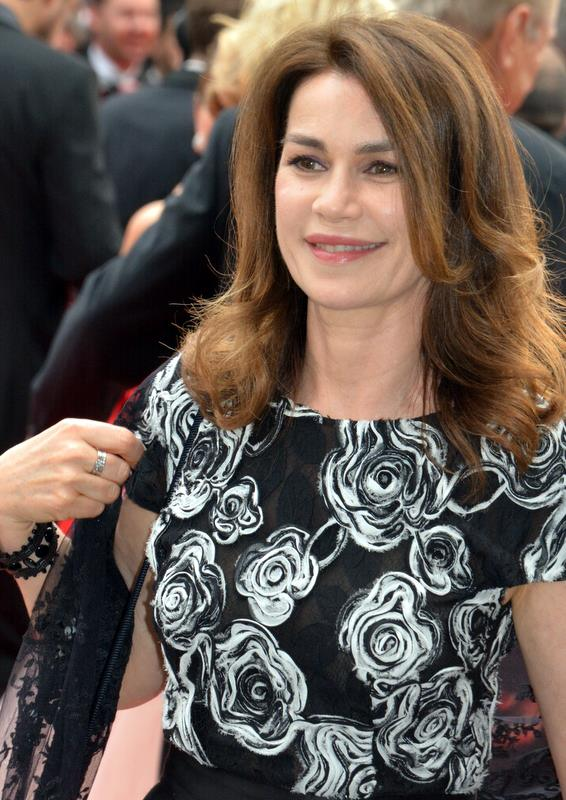
- Kaprisky in 2016
- Born: Valerie Chérès; 19 August 1962 (age 63); Neuilly-sur-Seine, France
- Occupation: Actress

Valérie Kaprisky (née Chérès; born 19 August 1962) is a French actress.

== Life and career ==
She was born Valerie Chérès on 19 August 1962 in Neuilly-sur-Seine. Kaprisky is her Polish mother's maiden name. She is of Greek-Ottoman and Argentine descent on her father's side. When she was eight years old, her family moved to Cannes, where she discovered the Cannes film festival and decided to become an actress. At 17, she moved to Paris, attending high school during the day and the Cours Florent acting school at night.

She appeared in a French erotic movie (Aphrodite), then made her American debut in the À bout de souffle remake Breathless (1983) starring alongside Richard Gere.

She also appeared in La femme publique (1984) by Andrzej Żuławski, for which she was a nominee for the 1985 César Award for Best Actress.

== Filmography ==
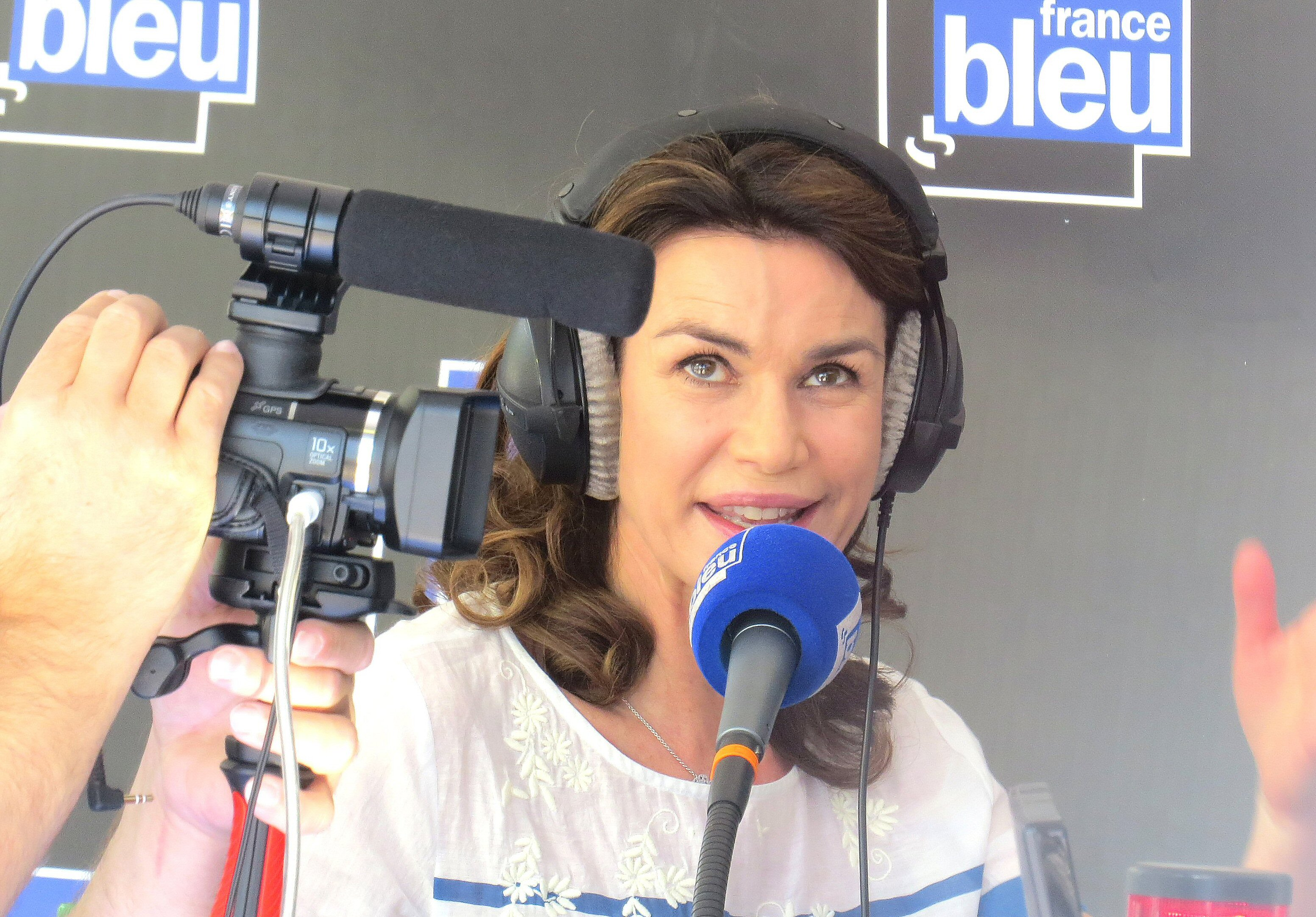
Valérie Kaprisky being interviewed at Cannes 2014

- 1981: Le Jour se lève et les conneries commencent
- 1981: Les Hommes préfèrent les grosses (Men Prefer Fat Girls): A friend of Éva
- 1982: Une glace avec deux boules ou je le dis à maman
- 1982: Aphrodite : Pauline
- 1982: Légitime violence : Nadine
- 1983: Breathless : Monica Poiccard
- 1984: La femme publique (The Public Woman): Ethel
- 1984: L'Année des méduses (Year of the Jellyfish): Chris
- 1986: La Gitane : Mona
- 1988: Mon ami le traître : Louise
- 1989: Stradivari : Francesca
- 1991: Milena : Milena Jesenska
- 1991: L'Amérique en otage (TV) : Zaleh
- 1993: La Fine è nota : Maria Manni
- 1994: Desire in Motion (Mouvements du désir) : Catherine
- 1995: Noël et après (TV) : Nicole
- 1995: Dis-moi oui... : Nathalie
- 1997: L'Enfant du bout du monde (TV) : Alice Valère
- 1998: La Dernière des romantiques (TV) : Lise Marie
- 1998: Il Tesoro di Damasco (feuilleton TV) : Marie
- 1999: Brigade des mineurs (TV) : Laurence Dorlaville
- 2000: Toute la ville en parle (TV) : Fabienne Serrant
- 2001: Glam : Treasure
- 2002: Sentiments partagés (TV) : Lisa
- 2003: Fenêtre sur couple : Fany
- 2003: Une place parmi les vivants : Maryse
- 2003: L'Acqua... il fuoco : Iris
- 2004: L'Homme de mon choix (TV) : Camille Rozières
- 2004: Moitié-moitié (TV) : Elizabeth Da Silva
- 2005: Mon petit doigt m'a dit... : Françoise Blayes
- 2005: Jaurès, naissance d'un géant (TV) : Louise
- 2005: Galilée (TV) : Marina
- 2007: Le Cœur des hommes 2 : Jeanne
- 2007: Le Clan Pasquier (TV) : Lucie
- 2010: Any Human Heart (miniseries)
- 2012: Joséphine, ange gardien TV Series (1 Episode : "Yasmina")
- 2014: Salaud, on t'aime : Francia
- 2021: The Last Mercenary : Ministre Sivardière
