= Mehdi El Glaoui =

French actor and film director

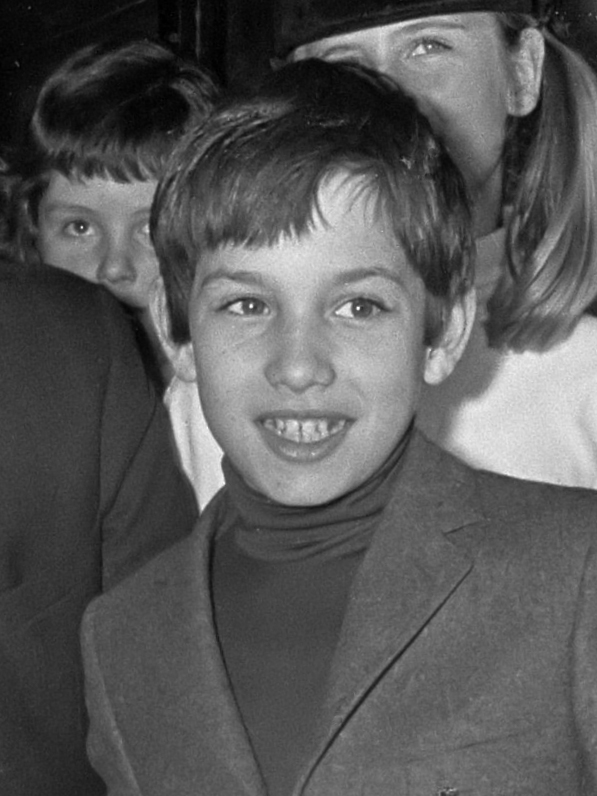
- Mehdi El Glaoui in 1969
- Born: Mehdi El Mezouari El Glaoui; 26 May 1956 (age 70); Choisy-le-Roi, France
- Occupations: Actor, director, screenwriter
- Years active: 1965–present
- Parent(s): Cécile Aubry; Si Brahim El Glaoui
- Family: Thami El Glaoui (grandfather)

Mehdi El Mezouari El Glaoui (born 26 May 1956), also known as Mehdi El Glaoui, is a French former actor, director and screenwriter. He is the son of actress Cécile Aubry and Si Brahim El Glaoui, caïd (local administrator) of Telouet and grandson of Thami El Glaoui, pasha of Marrakesh.

He made his acting début at the age of 5 in the TV series Poly, produced by his mother, and went on to reprise his rôle in numerous sequels covering nine seasons until he reached 14. Another series, Belle et Sébastien, was dubbed into English and became school holiday viewing in the UK. Later he continued his career as an actor and also dabbled in directing.

He appeared again on screen in 2005 and 2006 for the first time in nearly a decade, on the France 3 programmes 12-14 and Pour le plaisir respectively, revealing that he now lives in near Dax, Landes, collects classic cars and runs a musical café.

== Filmography ==
=== As actor ===
- Poly (1961–1973) – TV series (Poly is a pony. All other actors were local amateurs, whose voices were dubbed later by professionals)
- Belle et Sébastien (1965) – TV series; English version: "Belle and Sebastian"
- Sébastien parmi les hommes (1968) – sequel to the above; English version: "Belle, Sebastian and the Horses"
- Sébastien et la Marie-Morgane (1970) – TV series
- Le Jeune Fabre (1973) – TV series
- Loving in the Rain (1974) – film by Jean-Claude Brialy; English version: "Loving in the Rain"
- Catherine et Cie (1975) – film by Michel Boisrond; English version: "Catherine & Co."
- Kick, Raoul, la moto, les jeunes et les autres (1980)
- Salut champion (episode 'Moto story') (1981)
- La Famille Ramdam (1989) – TV series
- Le Cousin (1997) – film by Alain Corneau
- Inspecteur Moretti (episode 'Un enfant au soleil') (1997)
- Belle and Sebastian (2013)

=== As director ===
- Première classe (1984) (11 minutes; won César Award for best short film)
