= Cécile Aubry =

French actress, television director, writer and screenwriter

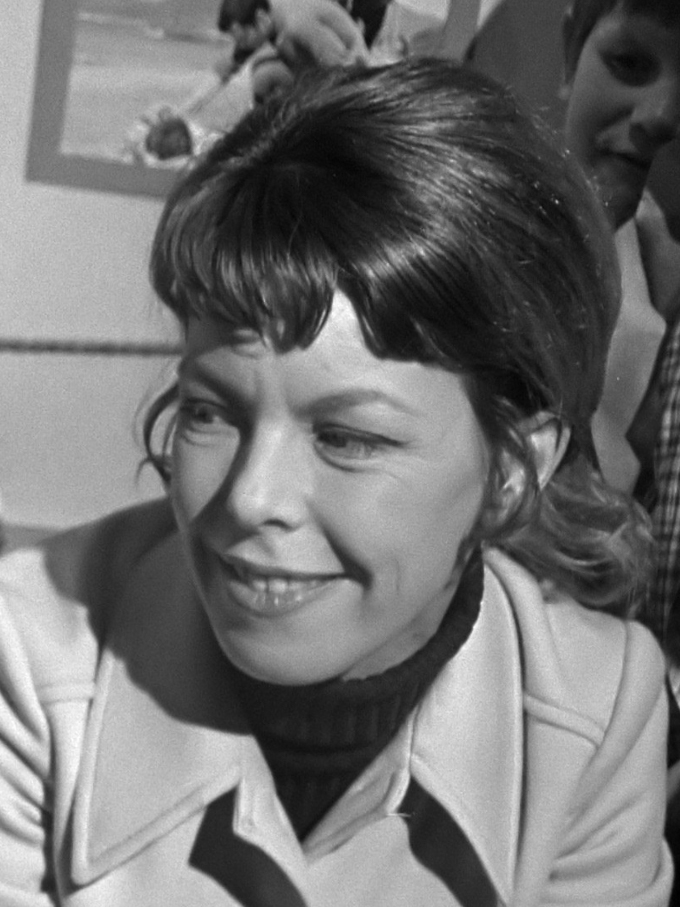
- Aubry in 1969
- Born: Anne-José Madeleine Henriette Bénard; 3 August 1928; Paris, France
- Died: 19 July 2010 (aged 81); Dourdan, France
- Occupations: Actress, author, director, screenwriter
- Years active: 1949–1960
- Notable work: Author: Belle et Sébastien; Film: The Black Rose
- Spouse: Si Brahim El Glaoui (m. 1953; div. 1959)
- Children: Mehdi El Glaoui

Cécile Aubry (born Anne-José Madeleine Henriette Bénard; 3 August 1928 – 19 July 2010) was a French film actress, author, television screenwriter and director.

== Life and career ==
Born in 1928, Aubry began her career as a dancer. At age 20, she was signed to 20th Century Fox. She made her break as the star of Henri-Georges Clouzot's Manon (1949), which won the Golden Lion of Saint Mark at the Venice Film Festival. That brought her a leading role alongside Tyrone Power and Orson Welles in American director Henry Hathaway's feature The Black Rose (1950). Aubry also appeared in Christian-Jacque's Bluebeard (1952), one of the first French-produced films to be made in color. For a short time, she was a Hollywood success, signing a lucrative contract with Fox, employing her parents as a publicity team, and regularly appearing in French film magazines as an example of the perfect hybrid of Franco-American femininity.

Aubry had a short film career. It was interrupted by a secret six-year marriage to Si Brahim El Glaoui, the eldest son of Thami El Glaoui, the Pasha of Marrakesh, whom she met in 1950 while filming The Black Rose. They had one child together, son Mehdi El Glaoui (born 1956), before their divorce. She announced her retirement from film in 1959, saying that she had only enjoyed cinema for its travel opportunities. Aubry went on to write children's books and scripts for children's television with considerable success.

Aubry became known in France for her television series for children, Poly, about a Shetland pony and a boy, and Belle and Sebastian, about a Pyrenean Mountain Dog and a boy, adapted for television from her books. The main character in each series was played by her son, Mehdi El Glaoui (credited as "Mehdi").

== Death ==
On 19 July 2010, Aubry died from lung cancer in Dourdan (Essonne), France, aged 81.

== Filmography ==
Year	Title	Role	Notes
1947	Une nuit à Tabarin		
1949	Manon	Manon Lescaut	
1950	The Black Rose	Maryam	
1950	Bluebeard	Aline	
1953	Piovuto dal cielo		
1954	Dancing in the Sun	Solotänzerin Nanon	
1957	La ironía del dinero	L'américaine	
1957	C'est arrivé à 36 chandelles	Cécile Aubry (uncredited)	
1963	L'espionne sera à Nouméa		Filmed in 1960
