= October 22 =

October 22 this year in various calendars
- Thursday, 22 October 2026
Akan	Nkyiyaw
Armenian	4 Trē 1476
Aztec	Izcalli 20, 13 Ācatl
Babylonian	9 Tashritu, 2337 SE
Balinese pawukon	Luang, Pepet, Kajeng, Jaya, Paing, Urukung, Wraspati of Dukut, Kala, Dadi, Raja
Bengali	6 Kartik, BS 1433
Chinese	Yin Earth Snake・Dipper Mansion; Fire Horse Year, Month 9, Day 13 (Hanlu, 1 day until Shuangjiang)
Common Era	22 October 2026 CE
Coptic	12 Paopi, AM 1743
Egyptian	9 Phamenoth, 2775 NE
Ethiopian	12 Ṭeqemt, 2019 Amätä Məhrät
French Republican	Décade III, Décadi de Vendémiaire de l'Année 235 de la République
Gregorian	22 October, AD 2026
Hebrew	11 Cheshvan, AM 5787
Hindu	Śatabhiṣaj・Vṛddhi; Solar: 5 Kārtika, 1948 SE; Lunisolar: Ekādaśī, Śukla pakṣa of Āśvina, 2083 VE; Rāudra・5127 KY・1,872,870
Icelandic	Fimmtudagur, 29 Haustmánuður 2026
Islamic	10 Jumada al-awwal, AH 1448 (using tabular method)
ISO week date	2026-W43-4
Japanese	12 Nagatsuki, Reiwa 8 (Kanro, 1 day until Sōkō)
Julian	9 October, AD 2026 (AM 7535)
Julian day	2461336
Korean	12 Gaedal, 4359 DE
Maya	13.0.14.0.13; 6 Zac, 13 Ben
Roman	ante diem VII Idus Octobres, MMDCCLXXIX AUC
Solar Hijri	30 Mehr, SH 1405
Tibetan	11 tha skar, me pho rta 2153 or 1772 or 1000

<<	October					>>
Su	Mo	Tu	We	Th	Fr	Sa
				1	2	3
4	5	6	7	8	9	10
11	12	13	14	15	16	17
18	19	20	21	22	23	24
25	26	27	28	29	30	31
2026

October 22 in recent years
2026 (Thursday)
2025 (Wednesday)
2024 (Tuesday)
2023 (Sunday)
2022 (Saturday)
2021 (Friday)
2020 (Thursday)
2019 (Tuesday)
2018 (Monday)
2017 (Sunday)

October 22 is the 295th day of the year (296th in leap years) in the Gregorian calendar; 70 days remain until the end of the year.

== Events ==
=== Pre-1600 ===
- 2137 BC – A solar eclipse occurs over China, one of the earliest recorded in human history, reportedly resulting in the executions of two astronomers who failed to predict it.
- 451 – The Chalcedonian Creed, regarding the divine and human nature of Jesus, is adopted by the Council of Chalcedon, an ecumenical council.
- 794 – Japanese Emperor Kanmu relocates his empire's capital to Heian-kyō (now Kyoto).
- 906 – Abbasid general Ahmad ibn Kayghalagh leads a raid against the Byzantine Empire, taking 4,000–5,000 captives.
- 1303 – Election of Pope Benedict XI following the death of Pope Boniface VIII in the previous weeks.
- 1383 – The male line of the Portuguese House of Burgundy becomes extinct with the death of King Fernando, leaving only his daughter Beatrice. Rival claimants begin a period of civil war and disorder.

=== 1601–1900 ===
- 1721 – The Russian Empire is proclaimed by Tsar Peter I after the Swedish defeat in the Great Northern War.
- 1724 – J. S. Bach leads the first performance of Schmücke dich, o liebe Seele (Adorn yourself, O dear soul) in Leipzig on the 20th Sunday after Trinity, based on the communion hymn of the same name.
- 1730 – Construction of the Ladoga Canal is completed in Russia.
- 1739 – The War of Jenkins' Ear begins with the first attack on La Guaira.
- 1746 – The College of New Jersey (later renamed Princeton University) receives its charter.
- 1777 – American Revolutionary War: American defenders of Fort Mercer on the Delaware River repulse repeated Hessian attacks in the Battle of Red Bank.
- 1790 – Northwest Indian War: Native American forces defeat the United States, ending the Harmar Campaign.
- 1797 – André-Jacques Garnerin makes the first recorded parachute jump, from 1,000 metres (3,300 ft) above Paris.
- 1836 – Sam Houston is inaugurated as the first President of the Republic of Texas.
- 1844 – The Millerites (followers of Baptist preacher William Miller) anticipate the end of the world in conjunction with the Second Advent of Christ. The following day becomes known as the Great Disappointment.
- 1859 – Spain declares war on Morocco.
- 1866 – A plebiscite ratifies the annexation of Veneto and Mantua to Italy, which had occurred three days before on October 19.
- 1877 – The Blantyre mining disaster in Scotland kills 207 miners.
- 1879 – Using a filament of carbonized thread, Thomas Edison tests the first practical electric incandescent light bulb; the bulb lasted 13 1/2 hours before burning out.
- 1883 – The Metropolitan Opera House in New York City opens with a performance of Charles Gounod's Faust.
- 1884 – The International Meridian Conference designates the Royal Observatory, Greenwich as the world's prime meridian.
- 1895 – In Paris, an express train derails after overrunning the buffer stop, crossing almost 30 metres (100 ft) of concourse before crashing through a wall and falling 10 metres (33 ft) to the road below.

=== 1901–present ===
- 1907 – A run on the stock of the Knickerbocker Trust Company sets events in motion that will spark the Panic of 1907.
- 1910 – Hawley Harvey Crippen (the first felon to be arrested with the help of radio) is convicted of poisoning his wife.
- 1923 – The royalist Leonardopoulos–Gargalidis coup d'état attempt fails in Greece, discrediting the monarchy and paving the way for the establishment of the Second Hellenic Republic.
- 1934 – In East Liverpool, Ohio, FBI agents shoot and kill the notorious bank robber Pretty Boy Floyd.
- 1936 – Dod Orsborne, captain of the Girl Pat is convicted of its theft and imprisoned, having caused a media sensation when it went missing.
- 1941 – World War II: French resistance member Guy Môquet and 29 other hostages are executed by the Germans in retaliation for the death of a German officer.
- 1943 – World War II: In the second firestorm raid on Germany, the British Royal Air Force conducts an air raid on the town of Kassel, killing 10,000 and rendering 150,000 homeless.
- 1946 – Over twenty-two hundred engineers and technicians from eastern Germany are forced to relocate to the Soviet Union, along with their families and equipment.
- 1947 – The first Kashmir war begins after Pakistani forces invade Kashmir, allegedly to suppress a tribal rebellion.
- 1962 – Cuban Missile Crisis: President Kennedy, after internal counsel from Dwight D. Eisenhower, announces that American reconnaissance planes have discovered Soviet nuclear weapons in Cuba, and that he has ordered a naval "quarantine" of the Communist nation.
- 1963 – A BAC One-Eleven prototype airliner crashes in UK with the loss of all on board.
- 1964 – Jean-Paul Sartre is awarded the Nobel Prize in Literature, though he does not accept the prize.
- 1975 – The Soviet uncrewed space mission Venera 9 lands on Venus.
- 1981 – The US Federal Labor Relations Authority votes to decertify the Professional Air Traffic Controllers Organization (PATCO) for its strike the previous August.
- 1983 – Two correctional officers are killed by inmates at the United States Penitentiary in Marion, Illinois. The incident inspires the Supermax model of prisons.
- 1987 – John Adams' opera Nixon in China premiered at the Houston Grand Opera.
- 1992 – Space Shuttle Columbia launches on STS-52 to deploy the LAGEOS-2 satellite and microgravity experiments.
- 1996 – Millon Air Flight 406 crashes after takeoff from Eloy Alfaro International Airport in Manta, Ecuador, killing 34 people.
- 1997 – Danish fugitive Steen Christensen kills two police officers, Chief Constable Eero Holsti and Senior Constable Antero Palo, in Ullanlinna, Helsinki, Finland during his prison escape.
- 1999 – Maurice Papon, an official in the Vichy government during World War II, is jailed for crimes against humanity.
- 2005 – Tropical Storm Alpha forms in the Atlantic Basin, making the 2005 Atlantic hurricane season the most active Atlantic hurricane season until surpassed by the 2020 season.
- 2005 – Bellview Airlines Flight 210 crashes in Nigeria, killing all 117 people on board.
- 2006 – A Panama Canal expansion proposal is approved by 77.8% of voters in a national referendum.
- 2007 – A raid on Anuradhapura Air Force Base is carried out by 21 Tamil Tiger commandos, with all except one dying in this attack. Eight Sri Lanka Air Force planes are destroyed and ten damaged.
- 2008 – India launches its first uncrewed lunar probe mission Chandrayaan-1.
- 2012 – Cyclist Lance Armstrong is formally stripped of his seven Tour de France titles after being charged for doping.
- 2013 – The Australian Capital Territory becomes the first Australian jurisdiction to legalize same-sex marriage with the Marriage Equality (Same Sex) Act 2013.
- 2014 – Michael Zehaf-Bibeau attacks the Parliament of Canada, killing a soldier and injuring three other people.
- 2015 – Anton Lundin Pettersson attacks a school in Trollhättan, killing three people and injuring two others.
- 2019 – Same-sex marriage is legalised, and abortion is decriminalised in Northern Ireland as a result of the Northern Ireland Assembly not being restored.

== Births ==
=== Pre-1600 ===
- 955 – Qian Weijun, king of Wuyue (died 991)
- 1071 – William IX, Duke of Aquitaine (died 1126)
- 1197 – Juntoku, Japanese emperor (died 1242)
- 1511 – Erasmus Reinhold, German astronomer and mathematician (died 1553)
- 1587 – Joachim Jungius, German mathematician and philosopher (died 1657)
- 1592 – Gustav Horn, Count of Pori (died 1657)

=== 1601–1900 ===
- 1659 – Georg Ernst Stahl, German chemist and physician (died 1734)
- 1689 – John V, Portuguese king (died 1750)
- 1701 – Maria Amalia, Holy Roman Empress (died 1756)
- 1729 – Johann Reinhold Forster, German pastor and botanist (died 1798)
- 1749 – Cornelis van der Aa, Dutch historian and bookseller (died 1816)
- 1778 – Javier de Burgos, Spanish jurist and politician (died 1848)
- 1781 – Louis Joseph, Dauphin of France (died 1789)
- 1783 – Constantine Samuel Rafinesque, Ottoman-French polymath and naturalist (died 1840)
- 1809 – Volney Howard, American lawyer, jurist, and statesman, Texas Attorney General (died 1889)
- 1811 – Franz Liszt, Hungarian pianist and composer (died 1886)
- 1818 – Leconte de Lisle, French poet and author (died 1894)
- 1821 – Collis Potter Huntington, American businessman (died 1900)
- 1832 – August Labitzky, Czech composer and conductor (died 1903)
- 1843 – Stephen Moulton Babcock, American agricultural chemist (died 1931)
- 1843 – James Strachan-Davidson, English classical scholar, academic administrator, translator, and author (died 1916)
- 1844 – Sarah Bernhardt, French actress and manager (died 1923)
- 1844 – Louis Riel, Canadian Métis scholar and politician (died 1885)
- 1847 – Koos de la Rey, South African Boer general (died 1914)
- 1850 – Charles Kingston, Australian politician, 20th Premier of South Australia (died 1908)
- 1858 – Augusta Victoria of Schleswig-Holstein (died 1921)
- 1859 – Prince Ludwig Ferdinand of Bavaria (died 1949)
- 1865 – Borghild Holmsen, Norwegian pianist, composer and music critic (died 1938)
- 1865 – Kristjan Raud, Estonian painter and illustrator (died 1943)
- 1870 – Ivan Bunin, Russian author and poet, Nobel Prize laureate (died 1953)
- 1870 – Lord Alfred Douglas, English author and poet (died 1945)
- 1873 – Gustaf John Ramstedt, Finnish linguist and diplomat (died 1950)
- 1873 – Rama Tirtha, Indian philosopher and educator (died 1906)
- 1875 – Théodore Monbeig, French Catholic missionary and botanist (died 1914)
- 1875 – David van Embden, Dutch economist and politician (died 1962)
- 1881 – Clinton Davisson, American physicist and academic, Nobel Prize laureate (died 1958)
- 1881 – Karl Bernhard Zoeppritz, German geophysicist and seismologist (died 1908)
- 1882 – Edmund Dulac, French-English illustrator (died 1953)
- 1882 – N. C. Wyeth, American painter and illustrator (died 1945)
- 1885 – Giovanni Martinelli, Italian tenor and actor (died 1969)
- 1886 – Erik Bergman, Swedish minister (died 1970)
- 1887 – John Reed, American journalist and poet (died 1920)
- 1893 – Ernst Öpik, Estonian astronomer and astrophysicist (died 1985)
- 1893 – Luis Otero, Spanish footballer (died 1955)
- 1894 – Mei Lanfang, Chinese actor and singer (died 1961)
- 1895 – Johnny Morrison, professional baseball player (died 1966)
- 1896 – Charles Glen King, American biochemist and academic (died 1988)
- 1896 – José Leitão de Barros, Portuguese film director and playwright (died 1967)
- 1897 – Marjorie Flack, American author and illustrator (died 1958)
- 1898 – Dámaso Alonso, Spanish poet and philologist (died 1990)
- 1899 – Salarrué, Salvadoran writer and painter (died 1975)

=== 1901–present ===
- 1903 – George Wells Beadle, American geneticist and academic, Nobel Prize laureate (died 1989)
- 1903 – Curly Howard, American comedian and vaudevillian (died 1952)
- 1904 – Constance Bennett, American actress, singer, and producer (died 1965)
- 1904 – Saúl Calandra, Argentine football player (died 1973)
- 1904 – Karl Guthe Jansky, American physicist and radio engineer (died 1950)
- 1905 – Joseph Kosma, Hungarian-French pianist and composer (died 1969)
- 1906 – Kees van Baaren, Dutch composer and educator (died 1970)
- 1906 – Aurelio Baldor, Cuban mathematician and lawyer (died 1978)
- 1907 – Jimmie Foxx, American baseball player (died 1967)
- 1907 – Günther Treptow, German tenor (died 1981)
- 1908 – John Gould, American journalist and author (died 2003)
- 1908 – José Escobar Saliente, Spanish cartoonist (died 1994)
- 1913 – Robert Capa, Hungarian-American photographer and journalist (died 1954)
- 1913 – Bảo Đại, Vietnamese emperor (died 1997)
- 1913 – Hans-Peter Tschudi, Swiss lawyer and politician, 63rd President of the Swiss Confederation (died 2002)
- 1915 – Yitzhak Shamir, Belarusian-Israeli civil servant and politician, 7th Prime Minister of Israel (died 2012)
- 1917 – Joan Fontaine, English-American actress (died 2013)
- 1918 – Lou Klein, American baseball player, coach, and manager (died 1976)
- 1919 – Doris Lessing, British novelist, poet, playwright, Nobel Prize laureate (died 2013)
- 1920 – Timothy Leary, American psychologist and author (died 1996)
- 1921 – Georges Brassens, French singer-songwriter and guitarist (died 1981)
- 1921 – Aleksandr Kronrod, Russian mathematician and computer scientist (died 1986)
- 1921 – Harald Nugiseks, Estonian sergeant (died 2014)
- 1923 – Bert Trautmann, German footballer and coach (died 2013)
- 1925 – Slater Martin, American basketball player and coach (died 2012)
- 1925 – Edith Kawelohea McKinzie, Hawaiian genealogist, author, and hula expert (died 2014)
- 1925 – Dory Previn, American singer-songwriter and guitarist (died 2012)
- 1925 – Robert Rauschenberg, American painter and illustrator (died 2008)
- 1927 – Allan Hendrickse, South African minister and politician (died 2005)
- 1928 – Clare Fischer, American pianist, composer and arranger (died 2012)
- 1928 – Nelson Pereira dos Santos, Brazilian director, producer, and screenwriter (died 2018)
- 1929 – Michael Birkett, 2nd Baron Birkett, English director and producer (died 2015)
- 1929 – Lev Yashin, Russian footballer (died 1990)
- 1930 – Estela de Carlotto, Argentine human rights activist
- 1930 – José Guardiola, Spanish singer (died 2012)
- 1931 – Ann Rule, American police officer and author (died 2015)
- 1933 – Carlos Alberto Sacheri, Argentine philosopher and martyr (died 1974)
- 1933 – Helmut Senekowitsch, Austrian footballer and manager (died 2007)
- 1934 – Donald McIntyre, New Zealand opera singer (died 2025)
- 1936 – John Blashford-Snell, English soldier, author, and explorer
- 1936 – Peter Cook, English architect and academic
- 1936 – Jovan Pavlović, Serbian metropolitan (died 2014)
- 1936 – Bobby Seale, American political activist and author, co-founder of the Black Panther Party
- 1937 – Alan Ladd Jr., American film producer and executive (died 2022)
- 1937 – José Larralde, Argentine singer-songwriter
- 1937 – Manos Loïzos, Egyptian-Greek composer (died 1982)
- 1938 – K. Indrapala, Sri Lankan historian and academic
- 1938 – Derek Jacobi, English actor
- 1938 – Christopher Lloyd, American actor, comedian and producer
- 1938 – César Luis Menotti, Argentine footballer and manager (died 2024)
- 1939 – Joaquim Chissano, Mozambican politician, 2nd President of Mozambique
- 1939 – George Cohen, English footballer (died 2022)
- 1939 – Tony Roberts, American actor and singer (died 2025)
- 1941 – Charles Keating, English-American actor (died 2014)
- 1942 – Bobby Fuller, American singer-songwriter and guitarist (died 1966)
- 1942 – Annette Funicello, American actress and singer (died 2013)
- 1942 – Pedro Morales, Puerto Rican wrestler (died 2019)
- 1943 – Allen Coage, American-Canadian wrestler and coach (died 2007)
- 1943 – Catherine E. Coulson, American actress (died 2015)
- 1943 – Jan de Bont, Dutch director, producer, and cinematographer
- 1943 – Catherine Deneuve, French actress and singer
- 1943 – Seif Sharif Hamad, Zanzibari politician, 2nd Chief Minister of Zanzibar (died 2021)
- 1945 – Yvan Ponton, Canadian actor and game show host
- 1945 – Sheila Sherwood, English long jumper
- 1945 – Michael Stoute, Barbadian-English horse trainer
- 1945 – Leslie West, American singer-songwriter and guitarist (died 2020)
- 1946 – Claude Charron, Canadian educator and politician
- 1946 – Godfrey Chitalu, Zambian footballer (died 1993)
- 1946 – Deepak Chopra, Indian-American physician and author
- 1946 – Elizabeth Connell, South African mezzo-soprano (died 2012)
- 1946 – Kelvin MacKenzie, English journalist
- 1946 – Jaime Nebot, Ecuadorian politician
- 1947 – Raymond Bachand, Canadian lawyer and politician
- 1947 – Haley Barbour, American lawyer and politician, 62nd Governor of Mississippi
- 1947 – Adam Gondvi, Indian poet (died 2011)
- 1948 – Squeaky Fromme, Manson family cult member who attempted to assassinate US President Gerald Ford
- 1948 – Mike Hendrick, English cricketer, coach, and umpire (died 2021)
- 1948 – Debbie Macomber, American author
- 1949 – Stiv Bators, American singer-songwriter, guitarist, and actor (died 1990)
- 1949 – Vasilios Magginas, Greek politician, Greek Minister of Employment (died 2015)
- 1949 – Manfred Trojahn, German flute player, composer, and conductor
- 1949 – Arsène Wenger, French footballer and manager
- 1950 – Donald Ramotar, Guyanese politician, 8th President of Guyana
- 1952 – Julie Dash, American director, producer, and screenwriter
- 1952 – Jeff Goldblum, American actor and producer
- 1953 – René Arce Islas, Mexican politician
- 1954 – Graham Joyce, English author and educator (died 2014)
- 1955 – John Adam, Australian rugby league player
- 1956 – Luis Guzmán, Puerto Rican actor
- 1956 – Alejandro Kuropatwa, Argentine photographer (died 2003)
- 1957 – Henry Lauterbach, German jumper
- 1957 – Daniel Melingo, Argentine musician (died 2026)
- 1958 – Bobby Blotzer, American drummer
- 1959 – Arto Salminen, Finnish journalist and author (died 2005)
- 1959 – Marc Shaiman, American composer and songwriter
- 1960 – Darryl Jenifer, American bass player
- 1960 – Brewster Kahle, American digital librarian, computer engineer, and internet entrepreneur
- 1960 – Cris Kirkwood, American singer-songwriter and bass player
- 1961 – Barbara Potter, American tennis player
- 1962 – Bob Odenkirk, American actor and comedian
- 1963 – Brian Boitano, American figure skater
- 1964 – TobyMac, American singer-songwriter and producer
- 1964 – Dražen Petrović, Croatian basketball player (died 1993)
- 1964 – Amit Shah, Indian politician, Minister of Home Affairs (since 2019).
- 1965 – Sumito Estévez, Venezuelan chef
- 1965 – Valeria Golino, Italian actress
- 1965 – John Wesley Harding, English singer-songwriter and guitarist
- 1965 – A. L. Kennedy, Scottish comedian, journalist, and author
- 1965 – Otis Smith, American football player and coach
- 1965 – Piotr Wiwczarek, Polish singer-songwriter, guitarist, and producer
- 1966 – Yuri Arbachakov, Russian-Japanese boxer
- 1966 – Maelo Ruiz, New York City-born Puerto Rican Salsa romántica singer
- 1967 – Salvatore Di Vittorio, Italian composer and conductor
- 1967 – Oona King, Baroness King of Bow, British business executive and politician
- 1967 – Ulrike Maier, Austrian skier (died 1994)
- 1967 – Carlos Mencia, Honduran-American comedian, actor, producer, and screenwriter
- 1967 – Ron Tugnutt, Canadian ice hockey player, coach, and sportscaster
- 1968 – Stephanie Cutter, American lawyer and political consultant
- 1968 – Shelby Lynne, American singer-songwriter and guitarist
- 1968 – Stéphane Quintal, Canadian ice hockey player
- 1968 – Shaggy, Jamaican singer-songwriter and DJ
- 1969 – Julio Borges, Venezuelan politician
- 1969 – Héctor Carrasco, Dominican baseball player
- 1969 – Spike Jonze, American actor, director, producer, and screenwriter
- 1969 – Helmut Lotti, Belgian singer-songwriter
- 1969 – Coque Malla, Spanish musician and actor
- 1970 – Winston Bogarde, Dutch footballer and manager
- 1970 – Javier Milei, Argentine politician and economist, President of Argentina
- 1971 – Amanda Coetzer, South African tennis player
- 1971 – Kornél Dávid, Hungarian basketball player
- 1971 – José Manuel Martínez, Spanish runner
- 1971 – Jennifer Lee, American filmmaker
- 1972 – Saffron Burrows, English-American actress
- 1973 – D'Lo Brown, American wrestler
- 1973 – Andrés Palop, Spanish footballer and manager
- 1973 – Ichiro Suzuki, Japanese baseball player
- 1973 – Mark van der Zijden, Dutch swimmer
- 1974 – Tim Kinsella, American singer-songwriter
- 1974 – Miroslav Šatan, Slovak ice hockey player
- 1975 – Martín Cardetti, Argentinian footballer and manager
- 1975 – Jesse Tyler Ferguson, American actor
- 1975 – Míchel Salgado, Spanish footballer
- 1976 – Luke Adams, Australian race walker
- 1978 – Chaswe Nsofwa, Zambian footballer (died 2007)
- 1978 – Owais Shah, Pakistani-English cricketer
- 1979 – Jannero Pargo, American basketball player and coach
- 1980 – Niall Breslin, Irish singer-songwriter, guitarist, producer, and footballer
- 1980 – Luke O'Donnell, Australian rugby league player
- 1981 – Michael Fishman, American actor and producer
- 1982 – Robinson Canó, Dominican baseball player
- 1982 – Heath Miller, American football player
- 1982 – Darren O'Day, American baseball player
- 1982 – Mark Renshaw, Australian cyclist
- 1983 – Byul, South Korean singer
- 1983 – Plan B, British singer and actor
- 1984 – Aleks Marić, Australian basketball player
- 1984 – Antti Pihlström, Finnish ice hockey player
- 1986 – Chancellor, South Korean-American musician
- 1986 – Kyle Gallner, American actor
- 1986 – Kara Lang, Canadian soccer player
- 1986 – Ștefan Radu, Romanian footballer
- 1987 – Tiki Gelana, Ethiopian runner
- 1987 – Donny Montell, Lithuanian singer-songwriter
- 1987 – Park Ha-sun, South Korean actress
- 1988 – Sarah Barrow, English diver
- 1988 – Parineeti Chopra, Indian actress
- 1988 – Corey Hawkins, American actor
- 1989 – JPEGMafia, American rapper and singer
- 1989 – Muhammad Wilkerson, American football player
- 1990 – Jonathan Lipnicki, American actor
- 1990 – David Savard, Canadian ice hockey player
- 1992 – 21 Savage, British-American rapper
- 1992 – Sofia Vassilieva, American actress
- 1993 – Charalambos Lykogiannis, Greek footballer
- 1994 – Corbin Burnes, American baseball player
- 1996 – B.I, South Korean rapper, singer-songwriter and producer
- 1996 – Johannes Høsflot Klæbo, Norwegian ski runner
- 1997 – Jan Köstering, German politician
- 1998 – Roddy Ricch, American rapper
- 1999 – Geraldo Perdomo, Dominican baseball player
- 2000 – Baby Keem, American rapper and record producer
- 2001 – Brian Branch, American football player
- 2001 – Jo Yu-ri, South Korean singer and actress

== Deaths ==
=== Pre-1600 ===
- 726 – Itzamnaaj K'awiil, a Maya ruler of Dos Pilas
- 741 – Charles Martel, Frankish political and military leader (born 688)
- 842 – Abo, Japanese prince (born 792)
- 1383 – Ferdinand I of Portugal, Portuguese king (born 1345)
- 1493 – James Douglas, 1st Earl of Morton, Scottish earl (born 1426)
- 1565 – Jean Grolier de Servières, French book collector (born 1479)

=== 1601–1900 ===
- 1604 – Domingo Báñez, Spanish theologian (born 1528)
- 1626 – Kikkawa Hiroie, Japanese daimyō (born 1561)
- 1708 – Hermann Witsius, Dutch theologian and academic (born 1636)
- 1751 – William IV, Prince of Orange (born 1711)
- 1792 – Guillaume Le Gentil, French astronomer (born 1725)
- 1853 – Juan Antonio Lavalleja, Uruguayan revolutionary general and politician, President of Uruguay (born 1784)
- 1859 – Louis Spohr, German violinist and composer (born 1784)
- 1883 – George Coulthard, Australian cricketer and footballer (born 1856)
- 1883 – Thomas Mayne Reid, Irish British novelist and soldier (born 1818)
- 1885 – Lewis Majendie, English politician (born 1835)
- 1891 – Ernst von Fleischl-Marxow, Austrian physiologist and physician (born 1846)

=== 1901–present ===
- 1902 – Herman Adolfovich Trautschold, German geologist and paleontologist (born 1817)
- 1906 – Paul Cézanne, French painter (born 1839)
- 1914 – Konishiki Yasokichi I, Japanese sumo wrestler, the 17th Yokozuna (born 1866)
- 1917 – Bob Fitzsimmons, English-American boxer (born 1863)
- 1917 – Charles Pardey Lukis, founder of the Indian Journal of Medical Research and later Director-General of the Indian Medical Service (born 1857)
- 1928 – Andrew Fisher, Scottish-Australian lawyer and politician, 5th Prime Minister of Australia (born 1862)
- 1934 – Pretty Boy Floyd, American gangster (born 1904)
- 1935 – Edward Carson, Irish-English lawyer and politician, Attorney General for England and Wales (born 1854)
- 1935 – Ettore Marchiafava, Italian physician (born 1847)
- 1941 – Guy Môquet, French militant (born 1924)
- 1952 – Ernst Rüdin, Swiss psychiatrist, geneticist, and eugenicist (born 1874)
- 1954 – Jibanananda Das, Bangladeshi-Indian author and poet (born 1899)
- 1956 – Hannah Mitchell, English activist (born 1872)
- 1959 – Joseph Cahill, Australian politician, 29th Premier of New South Wales (born 1891)
- 1965 – Muriel George, English singer and actress (born 1883)
- 1972 – James K. Baxter, New Zealand poet, writer, theologian, and social commentator. (born 1926)
- 1973 – Pablo Casals, Catalan cellist and conductor (born 1876)
- 1979 – Nadia Boulanger, French composer and educator (born 1887)
- 1979 – Mieko Kamiya, Japanese psychiatrist and author (born 1914)
- 1982 – Richard Hugo, American poet of the Pacific Northwest (born 1923)
- 1985 – Viorica Ursuleac, Romanian soprano and educator (born 1894)
- 1986 – Jane Dornacker, American musician, comedian, and reporter (born 1947)
- 1986 – Thorgeir Stubø, Norwegian guitarist and composer (born 1943)
- 1986 – Ye Jianying, Chinese general and politician, Head of State of the People's Republic of China (born 1897)
- 1986 – Albert Szent-Györgyi, Hungarian-American physiologist and biochemist, Nobel Prize laureate (born 1893)
- 1987 – Lino Ventura, Italian-French actor (born 1919)
- 1988 – Cynthia Freeman, American author (born 1915)
- 1989 – Ewan MacColl, English singer-songwriter, producer, actor, and playwright (born 1915)
- 1989 – Jacob Wetterling, American kidnapping victim (born 1978)
- 1990 – Louis Althusser, Algerian-French philosopher and academic (born 1918)
- 1991 – Hachiro Kasuga, Japanese singer and actor (born 1924)
- 1992 – Red Barber, American sportscaster (born 1908)
- 1992 – Cleavon Little, American actor (born 1939)
- 1993 – Innes Ireland, English racing driver and engineer (born 1930)
- 1995 – Kingsley Amis, English novelist, poet, critic (born 1922)
- 1995 – Mary Wickes, American actress and singer (born 1910)
- 1996 – Evdokia Reshetnik, Ukrainian zoologist
- 1997 – Leonid Amalrik, Russian animator, director, and screenwriter (born 1905)
- 2001 – Helmut Krackowizer, Austrian motorcycle racer and journalist (born 1922)
- 2002 – Richard Helms, American intelligence agent and diplomat, 8th Director of Central Intelligence (born 1913)
- 2002 – Geraldine of Albania, Hungarian noblewoman and Queen of Albania (born 1915)
- 2005 – Arman, French-American painter and sculptor (born 1928)
- 2005 – Tony Adams, Irish-American actor and producer (born 1953)
- 2006 – Arthur Hill, Canadian-American actor (born 1922)
- 2007 – Ève Curie, French pianist and journalist (born 1904)
- 2009 – Don Lane, American-Australian actor, singer, and talk show host (born 1933)
- 2009 – Soupy Sales, American comedian and actor (born 1926)
- 2010 – Eio Sakata, Japanese Go player (born 1920)
- 2011 – Sultan bin Abdulaziz, Saudi Arabian prince (born 1930)
- 2012 – Betty Binns Fletcher, American lawyer and judge (born 1923)
- 2012 – Mike Morris, English talk show host (born 1946)
- 2012 – Gabrielle Roth, American dancer, singer, and author (born 1941)
- 2013 – Marylou Dawes, Canadian pianist and educator (born 1933)
- 2013 – Lajos Für, Hungarian historian and politician, Minister of Defence of Hungary (born 1930)
- 2013 – William Harrison, American author and screenwriter (born 1933)
- 2013 – James Robinson Risner, American general and pilot (born 1925)
- 2014 – George Francis, English footballer and soldier (born 1934)
- 2014 – John-Roger Hinkins, American religious leader and author (born 1934)
- 2014 – Ashok Kumar, Indian director and cinematographer (born 1941)
- 2014 – John Postgate, English microbiologist, author, and academic (born 1922)
- 2015 – Willem Aantjes, Dutch civil servant and politician (born 1923)
- 2015 – Çetin Altan, Turkish journalist and politician (born 1927)
- 2015 – Murphy Anderson, American illustrator (born 1926)
- 2015 – Arnold Klein, American dermatologist and author (born 1945)
- 2015 – Joshua Wheeler, American sergeant (born 1975)
- 2016 – Steve Dillon, British comic book artist (born 1962)
- 2016 – Sheri S. Tepper, American writer (born 1929)
- 2017 – George Young, Australian musician, songwriter and record producer (born 1946)
- 2017 – Paul Weitz, American astronaut (born 1932)
- 2021 – Peter Scolari, American actor (born 1955)
- 2024 – Richard A. Cash, American global health researcher (born 1941)
- 2024 – Grizzly 399, American grizzly bear (born 1996)
- 2024 – Gustavo Gutiérrez, Peruvian philosopher, theologian and priest (born 1928)
- 2024 – Lynda Obst, American film producer and author (born 1950)
- 2024 – Fernando Valenzuela, Mexican baseball player, coach, and sportscaster (born 1960)
- 2025 – David Ball, English electronic musician (born 1959)

== Holidays and observances ==
- Christian feast day:
  - Abercius of Hieropolis
  - Cordula of Cologne
  - Donatus of Fiesole
  - Marcus of Jerusalem
  - Mellonius
  - Nunilo and Alodia
  - Pope John Paul II
  - October 22 (Eastern Orthodox liturgics)
- International Stuttering Awareness Day
- Jidai Matsuri (Kyoto, Japan)

== Bibliography ==
- Rosenthal, Franz, ed. (1985). The History of al-Ṭabarī, Volume XXXVIII: The Return of the Caliphate to Baghdad: The Caliphates of al-Muʿtaḍid, al-Muktafī and al-Muqtadir, A.D. 892–915/A.H. 279–302. SUNY Series in Near Eastern Studies. Albany, New York: State University of New York Press. ISBN 978-0-87395-876-9.
