= SS Empire Explorer =

World War II merchant ship of the United Kingdom

History
- Name: Inanda (1925–41); Empire Explorer (1941–42)
- Owner: Charente Steamship Co Ltd (1925–41); Ministry of War Transport (1941–42)
- Operator: T & J Harrison Ltd (1925–40); Royal Navy (1940); T & J Harrison Ltd (1941–42)
- Port of registry: Liverpool, United Kingdom (1925–41); (United Kingdom) London (1941–42)
- Builder: Swan, Hunter & Wigham Richardon Ltd
- Launched: 24 February 1925
- Completed: May 1925
- Out of service: 9 July 1942
- Identification: United Kingdom Official Number 147310; Code Letters KSNF (1925–34); Code Letters GLMB (1934–42)
- Fate: Sunk, 9 July 1942

General characteristics
- Class & type: Cargo liner (1925–41); Cargo ship (1941–42)
- Tonnage: 5,985 GRT; 3,746 NRT; 6,900 DWT
- Length: 407 ft 0 in (124.05 m)
- Beam: 52 ft 2 in (15.90 m)
- Draught: 25 ft 7 1/4 in (7.804 m)
- Depth: 28 ft 5 in (8.66 m)
- Installed power: 606 nhp
- Propulsion: Quadruple expansion steam engine, single screw propeller
- Speed: 13 knots (24 km/h)
- Crew: 70, plus 8 DEMS gunners (Empire Explorer)
- Armament: 1 x 4-in or 4.7-in gun, 8 x machine guns, kites (Empire Explorer)

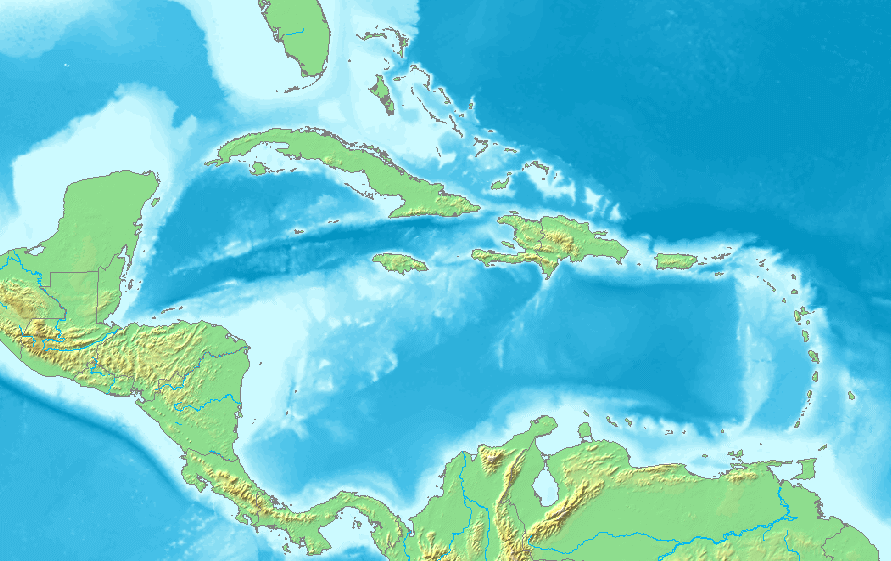
Location where Empire Explorer was torpedoed and sunk off Grenada.

Empire Explorer was a 5,985 GRT cargo ship that was built as the cargo liner Inanda in 1925 by Swan, Hunter & Wigham Richardson Ltd, Newcastle upon Tyne, Northumberland, United Kingdom for a British shipping line. She was hired by the Royal Navy in 1940 for use as an ocean boarding vessel but was sunk in an air raid London in September 1940. She was salvaged, rebuilt as a cargo ship, passed to the Ministry of War Transport (MoWT) and renamed Empire Explorer. She served until 9 July 1942, when she was torpedoed and sunk by U-575 in the West Indies.

== Description ==
The ship was built in 1925 by Swan, Hunter & Wigham Richardson Ltd, Newcastle upon Tyne, Northumberland.

The ship was 407 feet 0 inches (124.05 m) long, with a beam of 52 feet 2 inches (15.90 m). She had a depth of 28 feet 5 inches (8.66 m), and a draught of 25 feet 7 1/4 inches (7.804 m). She was assessed at 5,985 GRT, 3,746 NRT, 6,900 DWT.

The ship was propelled by a 606 nhp quadruple expansion steam engine, which had cylinders of 26 inches (66 cm), 36 inches (91 cm), 52 inches (130 cm) and 76 inches (190 cm) diameter by 54 inches (140 cm) stroke. The engine was built by the Wallsend Slipway Co Ltd, Newcastle upon Tyne. It drove a single screw propeller, and could propel the ship at 13 knots (24 km/h).

== History ==
Inanda was launched on 24 February 1925, and was completed in May. She was built for the Charente Steamship Co Ltd and placed under the management of T & J Harrison Ltd. Her port of registry was Liverpool. She was allocated the United Kingdom Official Number 137410 and Code Letters KSNF. On 3 February 1932, Inanda was on a voyage from London to the West Indies when she suffered a broken propeller. She put into Swansea, Glamorgan for repairs. Following the changes to Code Letters in 1934, Inanda was allocated GLMB. In August 1936, Inanda brought George "Dod" Orsborne and his brother James back to the United Kingdom from Georgetown, British Guiana, where they had taken the Grimsby trawler Girl Pat without authority.

Inanda was a member of Convoy OA 7, which departed from Southend, Essex on 19 September 1939 and dispersed at sea on 22 September. She was bound for Antigua, where she arrived on 3 October. She departed that day and sailed to Saint Kitts, arriving later that day. On 4 October, Inanda sailed for Grenada, arriving on 6 October and departing that day for Trinidad, where she arrived the next day. On 9 October, she sailed for Demarara, British Guiana, arriving the next day and departing on 14 October for Trinidad, where she arrived on 15 October. Departing on 20 October, Saint Vincent and Grenada were visited before Inanda arrived at Saint Lucia, from where she sailed on 25 October for Halifax, Nova Scotia, Canada. She arrived on 2 November, sailing on 8 November as a member of Convoy HXF 8, which arrived at Dover, Kent, United Kingdom on 21 November. Inanda was carrying general cargo, rum and sugar. She then sailed to Southend to join Convoy FN 46, which departed on 1 December and arrived at Methil, Fife the next day. She left the convoy at Middlesbrough, Yorkshire on 2 December.

Inanda sailed from Middlesbrough on 11 December to join Convoy FS 53, which had sailed from Methil that day and arrived at Southend on 12 December. She then joined Convoy OA 53, which sailed on 14 December and dispersed at sea on 16 December. She was carrying a cargo of sulphite as well as a number of passengers and her captain was the convoy's Vice Commodore. Inanda was bound for Demerara, which was reached on 9 January 1940 via Barbados and Trinidad. She departed on 13 January for Montserrat, from where she sailed on 15 January for Trinidad. She departed on 16 January for Galveston, Texas, United States, arriving on 22 January and sailing on 3 February for Halifax, where she arrived on 13 February. Inanda was a member of Convoy HX 20, which departed on 16 February and arrived at Liverpool on 4 March. She was carrying general cargo.

Inanda departed from Liverpool on 29 March as a member of Convoy OB 119, which dispersed at sea on 1 April. She was performing the rôle of a convoy rescue ship and sailed to London after the convoy had dispersed. She then sailed to Southend, from where she departed on 8 April as a member of Convoy OA 125G, which formed Convoy OG 25 on 10 April. Inanda was carrying general cargo bound for Antigua, arriving on 24 April and sailing that day for Saint Kitts, where she arrived on 24 April. She sailed the next day for Saint Lucia, from where she departed on 26 April for Grenada, arriving on 29 April. She spent the next few weeks sailing around the West Indies, arriving at Bermuda on 20 May. Carrying general cargo, Inanda was a member of Convoy BHX 64, which departed on 7 August and joined with convoy HX 64 on 12 August. Convoy HX 64 departed from Halifax on 8 August and arrived at Liverpool on 23 August. Inanda was bound for London, which was reached by leaving the convoy and sailing to the Methil Roads, where she arrived on 24 August. She then joined Convoy FS 262, which departed on 25 August and arrived at Southend on 27 August.

Inanda was then hired by the Royal Navy for use as an ocean boarding vessel. On 7 September, she was berthed at London Docks when she was sunk in an air raid. She was salvaged and rebuilt as a cargo ship. Inanda was renamed Empire Explorer, she was passed to the MoWT and placed under the management of T & J Harrison Ltd. Her port of registry was changed to London although she retained the Code Letters GLMB.

Empire Explorer was a member of Convoy FN 632, which departed from Southend on 15 February 1942 and arrived at Methil two days later. She left the convoy at the Tyne on 16 February, to load general cargo. She sailed four days later to join Convoy FN 636, which had departed from Southend on 19 February and arrived at Methil on 21 February. She then joined Convoy EN 50, which departed the next day and arrived at Oban, Argyllshire on 23 February. She left the convoy at Loch Ewe and sailed to Saint Kitts, arriving on 17 March. Empire Explorer spent the next five weeks sailing around the West Indies, arriving at the Cape Verde Islands on 20 April and sailing two days later for Halifax, where she arrived on 30 April. She joined Convoy HX 188, which departed on 3 May and arrived at Liverpool on 15 May. She was carrying general cargo, sugar and 38 bags of mail. She left the convoy at the Clyde, arriving on 15 May.

Empire Explorer sailed on 1 June to join Convoy OS 30, which departed from Liverpool that day and arrived at Freetown, Sierra Leone on 19 June. She was in ballast and armed with a 4-inch or 4.7-inch gun, eight machine guns and a number of kites. She was stated to be bound for George, South Africa. She arrived at Demerara on 21 June, sailing nine days later for Trinidad, where she arrived on 1 July. Empire Explorer sailed from Trinidad on 8 July, carrying 200 bags of mail, 1,000 long tons (1,000 t) of pitch and 4,000 long tons (4,100 t) of sugar and bound for Barbados. At 02:47 German time on 9 July, Empire Explorer was torpedoed, shelled and sunk at 11°40′N 60°55′W by U-575, which was in the command of Günther Heydemann. Of her 70 crew and 8 DEMS gunners, three crew were killed. The survivors were rescued by HMS MTB 337 and landed at Tobago.

Those killed serving on Inanda and Empire Explorer are commemorated on the Tower Hill Memorial, London. Inanda has been depicted on postage stamps issued by Barbados and Saint Kitts and Nevis.

== See also ==
- Empire ship
