= Liliana Komorowska =

Polish actress and filmmaker (born 1956)

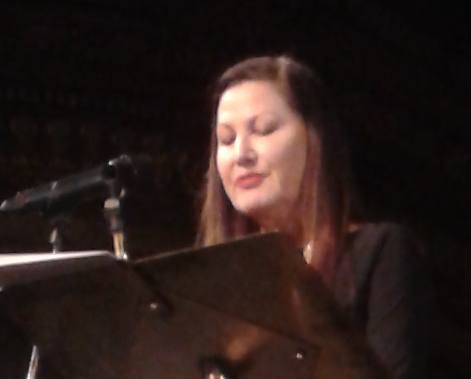
- Komorowska in 2019
- Born: Liliana Głąbczyńska; 11 April 1956 (age 69); Gdańsk, Poland
- Occupation(s): Actress, filmmaker
- Years active: 1964–present

Liliana Komorowska (born 11 April 1956) is a Polish actress and filmmaker. She has appeared in more than fifty films since 1964.

== Selected filmography ==
=== Film ===
Liliana Komorowska film credits
Year	Title	Role	Notes
1983	Austeria	Jewdocha	Credited as Liliana Głąbczyńska
1991	Scanners III: The Takeover	Helena Monet	
1995	Screamers	Private Landowska	
1997	The Assignment	Agnieska	
2000	The Art of War	Jenna Novak	
2002	Extreme Ops	Yana	
2002	Alice's Odyssey (L'Odyssée d'Alice Tremblay)	Scheherazade	

=== Television ===
Liliana Komorowska television credits
Year	Title	Role	Notes
1987	The Equalizer	Sarka	Episode: "Encounter in a Closed Room"
1994–1995	Highlander: The Series	Mara Leonin	2 episodes
2001	The Royal Scandal	Irene Adler	TV film
