= Scanners III: The Takeover =

1992 sci-fi horror film by Christian Duguay

- Promotional release poster
- Directed by: Christian Duguay
- Written by: B.J. Nelson
- Based on: Characters created by David Cronenberg
- Produced by: Pierre David
- Starring: Liliana Komorowska; Valérie Valois; Steve Parrish; Colin Fox; Daniel Pilon
- Cinematography: Hugues de Haeck
- Edited by: Yves Langlois
- Music by: Marty Simon
- Distributed by: Malofilm Distribution
- Release date: May 14, 1992
- Running time: 99 min.
- Country: Canada
- Language: English
- Budget: $6 million

Scanners III: The Takeover (also known as Scanner Force in UK) is a 1992 Canadian science fiction horror film, the second sequel to the film Scanners. It was directed by Christian Duguay. The film received mixed reviews, and is the least successful Scanners film. This sequel has a different set of characters from either of the preceding films in the series.

In addition to having the same director and screenwriter, this film also features a few actors from Scanners II: The New Order. For instance, Jason Cavalier from Scanners II: The New Order (with the exploding tumor) plays a punk leader in Scanners III: The Takeover.

== Plot ==
Alex Monet, a Scanner, accidentally kills his best friend while demonstrating his powers at a Christmas party. Devastated, he goes to a monastery in Thailand in order to learn how to control his powers.

Two years later, Alex's adoptive father, Elton, is developing an experimental drug patch named EPH-3 (a variant of Ephemerol), which he hopes can help Scanners repress their powers and live normal lives. Helena, Elton's stepdaughter/Alex's sister, is also a Scanner. She desires to use the drug as a way to inhibit the migraines she suffers from her abilities creating voices in her head. However, Elton explains she cannot use it until he has researched the drug's side effects. Despite his warnings, Helena secretly partakes some EPH-3. It quickly drives Helena to becoming unhinged, resulting in her using her powers to commit a string of murders, starting with Baumann, a corrupt doctor who used to torture her with medical experiments when she was very young. She eventually kills Elton and takes over his pharmaceutical company before using the EPH-3 to create her own army of Scanners from Baumann's patients.

Michael, a friend of Elton's, travels to Thailand and locates Alex. After informing Alex of the situation, Michael is killed by a group of villagers being mind-controlled by one of Helena's Scanners. Alex receives one final training course from his mentor at the monastery, then leaves Thailand to deal with Helena. Meanwhile, Helena discovers that she can use her powers through television signals. Yearning for more power, she kills Mark Dragon, the owner of a TV network where she works, taking over his position.

Alex arrives back in the United States, where he meets up with his ex-girlfriend Joyce and informs her about Helena's descent into madness. The two rekindle their relationship as they work together to stop her. Alex defeats each of Helena's Scanners, but Helena gains control of Joyce's mind. Helena prepares to broadcasts herself on live TV, intending to use her powers to kill millions of viewers. However, Alex breaks into the TV station before she can accomplish the mass murder and rescues Joyce. In the ensuing battle, Alex is able to remove the EPH-3 patch from Helena's body. Helena reverts back to normal, but, overcome with guilt, she commits suicide by electrocuting herself. After Alex and Joyce leave, however, Helena's consciousness transfers itself into a video camera, as she smiles menacingly.

== Cast ==
- Liliana Komorowska as Helena Monet
- Steve Parrish as Alex Monet
- Valerie Valois as Joyce Stone
- Colin Fox as Elton Monet
- Peter Wright as Mark Dragon
- Daniel Pilon as Michael
- Harry Hill as Dr. Baumann
- Michael Copeman as Mitch
- Claie Cellucci as Suzy
- Jason Cavalier as Punk Leader

== Production ==
Two weeks of the film's nine week shooting schedule were filmed in Thailand. Director Christian Duguay met his future wife Liliana Komorowska while working on the film.

== Release ==
Scanners III: The Takeover was released on May 14, 1992.

The film was released on VHS in the United States by Republic Pictures, in Canada by Malofilm Home Video and in the UK by First Independent Films. A DVD version of the film is included in the Scanners Trilogy box set released only in the EU by Starz Home Entertainment. This box also includes the first and second Scanner film. Shout! Factory's new horror label Scream Factory released a Region 1 DVD/Blu-ray edition on September 10, 2013.

== Reception ==
In a review of the Scanners II and Scanners III double feature combo pack, Creative Loafing commented that the original Scanners was one of David Cronenberg's weaker films and that the sequels failed to effectively build on its premise. Concluding that "Scanners III contains an even worse script, even worse acting and even worse effects [than Scanners II]", the reviewer gave it one star.

Conversely, in an article for Bloody Disgusting ranking all five of the Scanners films, Daniel Baldwin ranked Scanners III as the third-best in the series, calling it "absolutely bonkers" and saying "it’s kind of impossible to not beam with excitement when writing about this one. It simply has to be seen to be believed."
