= Scanners II: The New Order =

1991 film by Christian Duguay

- Promotional release poster
- Directed by: Christian Duguay
- Written by: B. J. Nelson
- Based on: Characters by David Cronenberg
- Produced by: Pierre David; René Malo
- Starring: David Hewlett; Deborah Raffin; Yvan Ponton; Raoul Trujillo
- Cinematography: Rodney Gibbons
- Edited by: Yves Langlois
- Music by: Marty Simon
- Production companies: Malofilm; Allegro Films; Filmtech; Image Organization
- Distributed by: Triton Pictures
- Release date: June 28, 1991
- Running time: 104 minutes
- Country: Canada
- Language: English
- Budget: $5 million

Scanners II: The New Order is a 1991 Canadian science fiction thriller film. It is a sequel to the 1981 feature film Scanners with a different cast, starring David Hewlett, Deborah Raffin, Raoul Trujillo, and Yvan Ponton. It was written by B. J. Nelson and directed by Christian Duguay. The plot involves a crooked police commissioner (Ponton) who schemes to gain control of a major city by manipulating Scanners (persons born with telepathic and telekinetic abilities) to do his bidding. The film was released direct-to-video.

== Plot ==
David Kellum, a young veterinarian intern, discovers during one of his classes that he can read and control minds of others. When he moves from his country home to the city to continue his studies, he finds difficulty in controlling this ability: the congestion of many minds and the ability to hear voices overwhelm him.

Stumbling across a store robbery, David kills the gunman by causing his head to explode. Police Commander John Forrester watches the store's security tape. He explains to David that he is a Scanner, and there are others like him around the world. He asks for David's help in tracking down elusive criminals. David agrees.

After capturing a man who put strychnine in milk containers throughout the city, Forrester introduces David to Peter Drak, another Scanner who works for him. Drak is more aggressive with his powers. Forrester teaches David techniques by using Drak as a test subject. Drak considers David an enemy but is injected with Eph2, a variant of Ephemerol, the drug that originally created Scanners. It calms Drak before he can harm David. Forrester tells David that although Eph2 calms a Scanner's mind, it is addictive and he should never use it. Forrester encourages him to develop and control his mental abilities on his own.

David feels he has accomplished something by helping with law enforcement. However, his feelings change when Forrester directs him to control the mayor and have her announce Forrester as the next chief of police. Forrester reassures him that this will enable them to stop all crimes. David, feeling guilty, disagrees and questions Forrester's agenda. He explains to the mayor how he forced her to appoint Forrester and apologizes. They plan to remove Forrester from office. After David tells Forrester that he is quitting, Forrester has Drak attack David and kill the mayor. David escapes and hides at his parents' home.

He asks his parents about his abilities, and they tell him that he was adopted. They explain that his birth parents were Cameron Vale and Kim Obrist (from the first film Scanners). Vale and Obrist told them about his abilities and that he was in danger. David goes for a walk. While he is gone, Drak and his accomplices kill David's mother and leave David's father for dead. When David returns, his father tells him about his older sister, Julie Vale. He leaves his father with paramedics and begins searching for his sister.

He finds Julie in a secluded cabin. She confirms who she is and explains that their parents were killed by Forrester for resisting him. She also states that her former boyfriend Walter agreed to test the earlier version of Ephemerol and was one of the first Scanners to use the drug, a more unstable version. Walter was kidnapped by Forrester and never seen again. Julie agrees to help David.

Together they go to Forrester's secret compound and discover that Walter is alive and is one of the test subjects with addiction to Eph2. Julie and David disable the perimeter guards. Once inside, Julie is tranquilized. David leaves her behind to destroy the research and free the test subject Scanners. Drak attacks David in the test subject quarters, but Drak is stopped by a combined attack by all test subjects, which drains away Drak's life force. This reverses the physical damage suffered by the addicted Scanners and reverses David's injuries from Drak's attack.

Forrester arrives on the scene as well as television news reporters and camera crews. He denies the existence of Scanners and his connection to the mayor's death. David, using his powers, forces Forrester to admit his involvement and motivation before cameras. Afterward, Forrester grabs a shotgun and tries to shoot David, but David and Julie deform Forrester's head and face using telekinesis. David then announces to the cameras that Scanners mean no harm and wish to live in peace.

== Cast ==
- David Hewlett as David Kellum
- Deborah Raffin as Julie Vale
- Yvan Ponton as Commander John Forrester
- Isabelle Mejias as Alice Leonardo
- Raoul Trujillo as Peter Drak
- Tom Butler as Dr. Morse
- Vlasta Vrána as Lieutenant Guy Gelson
- Dorothée Berryman as Mayor Lanzoni
- Murray Westgate as George Kellum
- Doris Petrie as Susan Kellum
- Emily Eby as Reporter
- Jason Cavalier as Convenience Store Thug

== Production ==
Pierre David who produced the original Scanners film as well as several other David Cronenberg films had been interested in a follow-up to Scanners beginning with development on a TV series in the early 80s that ultimately never came to be. After partnering with producer René Malo of Malofilm who bought the sequel rights from David, Scanners II: The New Order was set to be shot back to back with Scanners III: The Takeover. The film marked the theatrical directorial debut of Cinematographer Christian Duguay, who up to that point had mostly directed episodes of TV series Crossbow. Duguay initially turned down the offer to direct as he was uninterested in science-fiction or horror material and didn't like the script, but Malo eventually convinced Duguay he could lend his own vision to it. After original Scanners effects artists Chris Walas and Stephan Dupuis proved unavailable, Mike Smithson was hired to supervise the effects team, but due to a rushed two month schedule often had to pare down the effects as the script called for more head explosions than would have been feasible in such a compressed amount of time, leading the team to find alternate ways of showcasing Scanner abilities. The film was shot in Montreal in December 1989. During the eleven week shoot, temperatures were pushed down to forty degrees below zero which caused production to be shut down for a day.

== Release ==
Scanners II: The New Order was released on June 28, 1991. A home video release followed on November 14, 1991.

The film was released on VHS by 20th Century Fox Home Entertainment and Media Home Entertainment in the U.S. and in Canada by Malofilm Home Video. A DVD version of the film is included in the Scanners Trilogy box set released only in Europe by Starz Home Entertainment. Shout! Factory's new horror label Scream Factory released a Region 1 DVD/Blu-ray edition on September 10, 2013.

== Reception ==
In a review of the Scanners II / Scanners III double feature combo pack, Creative Loafing commented that the original Scanners was one of David Cronenberg's weaker films and that the sequels failed to effectively build on its premise. Citing "a weak script, poor acting and middling effects", the reviewer gave it one and a half stars.

In an article for Bloody Disgusting ranking all five of the Scanners films, Daniel Baldwin called Scanners II the weakest film in the series, citing the poor writing and unnecessary subplots, but praised the special effects and some of the cast performances.
