= Ultimatum (game show) =

Canadian television quiz show

Ultimatum is a Canadian French language television game show, broadcast from 2001 to 2004 on the TVA network. The show, produced in Montreal, Quebec was hosted by Yvan Ponton. Its visual style and lighting were largely inspired by the success of the British/American game show Who Wants to Be a Millionaire?. The game featured two rounds of trivia in 12 categories, with the final round being the titular ultimatum.

== Game rules ==
=== Standard game ===
The game was played with five contestants, who would stay on the show for a full week. The first "controller" was a randomly chosen player on Monday, and the winner of the previous game on other days of that week.

Twelve categories were available, each with three questions (five in Season 1). They were as follows: News, Animals, Arts, Film and Television, Amazing, True Stories, Geography, Languages, Music, Québec, Science and Technology, Sports and Recreation. Once all questions of a category were exhausted, it was removed for the rest of the round.

On each turn, the controller picked a category. A four-way multiple choice question of that category was then read and the controller could either answer it themselves or redirect it to another contestant using the Piège.

If the contestant answered a question correctly, they became the new controller and the outgoing controller lost a "life". If the contestant answered incorrectly, they lost a life and the controller retained control. Each contestant began the game with three lives, and if they were reduced to zero, were eliminated from the game.

Each player also had access to a number of "tools" to encourage strategic play. Each tool could be invoked only once by each player over the course of the game. They were:

- Ricochet, which could be used by a player who was asked to answer a question to redirect the question to any other contestant (except the controller) as if the controller had asked them directly.
- Miroir (mirror), which could also be used by a player who was asked a question, but would instead direct the question back on the controller, reversing the roles.
- Piège (trap), which was used by the controller. If a controller found a question they were sure they knew the answer to, they could "trap" another contestant of their choice, answer the question themselves, and, if correct, cost the trapped player a life. If wrong, the trapped player assumed control and the outgoing controller lost a life.

When any of these tools was invoked, or if the contestant had no tools left to use, the host would declare a question to be an "ultimatum", with more dramatic lighting and more tense background music was played. The affected player would have 10 seconds of thinking time, after which they must immediately respond.

After all contestants but one had been eliminated, the remaining contestant was declared the winner of CA$1,000 (CA$500 in Season 3) and went on to play the bonus round.

=== Bonus round ===
==== Seasons 1 and 2 ====
The winner would first choose a category from the board. Then, for each life they had remaining at the end of the game, they could eliminate an opponent of their choice, meaning they would not be allowed to help the rest answer the question. In this fashion, if a winner had all three lives left, the bonus round would effectively be one-on-one.

The winner was then placed in a soundproof booth and a four-way multiple choice question of the selected topic was given to the active opponents. They had 10 seconds to discuss among themselves and then give an answer. Then the winner was released and also given 10 seconds to answer it.

The prize in this round was CA$4,000, which was split amongst those who have answered correctly: CA$500 for each opponent and the rest for the winner.

==== Season 3 ====
Only the winner was given a question of their selected topic. They still had 10 seconds to think and, if they answered correctly, won CA$1,000.

==== Weekly ranking ====
At the end of each week, whoever won the most money in the group became the week's ultimate winner. In the first two seasons, the ultimate winner would return in the next week. If two or more players tied for first place, the whole group would return in the next week. In Season 3, if this happened, an open-ended toss-up question was given to all tied players, and whoever buzzed in with the right answer would be the ultimate winner.

=== Tournament play ===
In Season 3, five six-week themed tournament were held—between Uniformed Professions, Families (twice in a row), Artists and Generations, respectively. The five contestants played every day from Monday through Friday, with the player who won the most money invited back for the finals. Then four additional weeks would be played each with five new contestants. When five finalists had been crowned, those finalists played an additional week against each other, with the winner of the finals receiving CA$40,000.

In the two "Families" tournaments, teams of three family members would compete, though only one member could represent the family in each show's first round. If that member moved on to the bonus round, their whole team could confer in answering the question.

== See also ==
- List of Quebec television series
