= Cornelis van der Aa =

Dutch writer and bookseller (1749–1816)

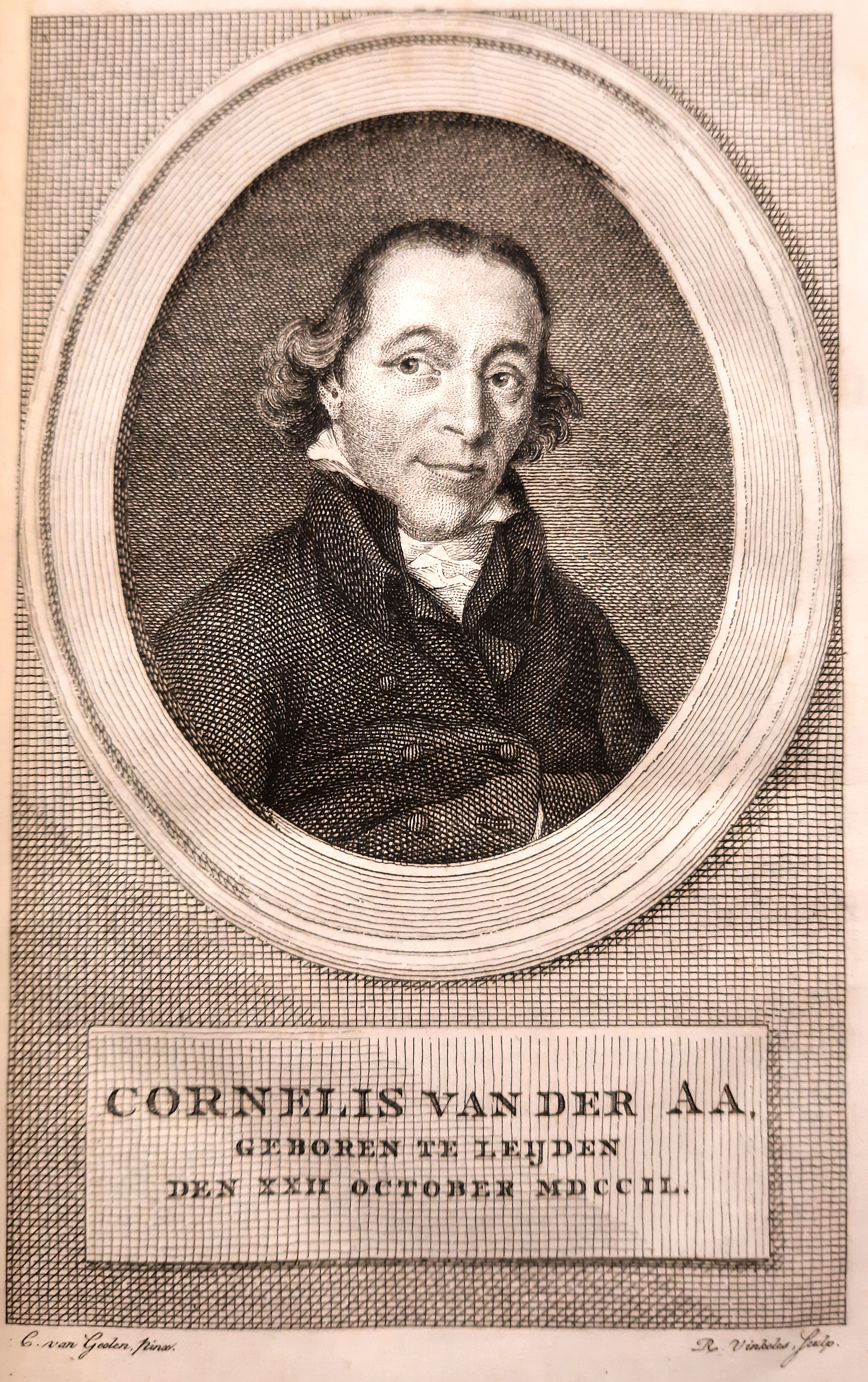

Cornelis van der Aa (22 October 1749 – 26 October 1816) was a Dutch writer and bookseller in Haarlem who was sentenced in 1796 by the schepenen of the city to five years of imprisonment and consecutive perpetual exile from the department in Holland for political reasons as he was a follower of the stadtholders. At the end of 1799, he was released and settled in Utrecht as a bookseller. From then on until his death in 1816 in Amsterdam, where he moved to later on, he spent his time writing books. He was born in Leiden and died in Amsterdam.

== Works ==
- Handboekje der Vaderlandsche Geschiedenissen, Dordrecht 1804, 6 parts, 12o.
- Geschiedenis van den jongstgeëindigden oorlog, tot op het sluiten van den vrede te Amiens, Amsterdam 1808, 10 parts, illustrated, gr. 8o.
- De Geschiedenis der Vereenigde Nederlanden en derzelver buitenlandsche bezittingen, Dordrecht 1811, 25 parts, illustrated, kl. 8o.
- Geschiedenis van het leven, karakter en lotgevallen van Willem V. Prins van Oranje en Nassau, Franeker 1810, 5 parts with portraits, gr. 8o.
- De doorluchtige Vorsten uit den Huize van Oranje-Nassau en derzelver uitmuntende daden, Amsterdam 1814, gr. 8o.
- De Tirannijen der Franschen in den jare 1747, 1785-1813 in de Nederlanden gepleegd, Amsterdam 1814, kl. 8o.
- Verslag van de gebeurtenissen in Amsterdam en Woerden in November en December 1813, Amsterdam 1814, 2 booklets, gr. 8o.
