= Girl Pat =

Small fishing trawler from the Lincolnshire port of Grimsby

- Girl Pat, photographed during her period of service with the Port of London Authority, circa 1945

History

United Kingdom
- Name: Girl Pat (1935–40); HMT Girl Pat (1940–45); Girl Pat (1945–?)
- Owner: Marstrand Fishing Co. Ltd., Grimsby (1935–36); Girl Pat Ltd. Grimsby (1936–39); Port of London Authority (1939–40); Royal Navy (1940–45); Port of London Authority (1945–?)
- Port of registry: (United Kingdom) Grimsby (1935–39); (United Kingdom) London (1939–40); Royal Navy (1940–45); (United Kingdom) London (1945–?)
- Builder: at Oulton Broad
- In service: 1935
- Identification: UK Official Number 162904; Fishing registration GY 176 (1935–40, 1945–?)

General characteristics
- Type: Trawler (1935–39); Wreck marking vessel (1939–40, 1945–?); Auxiliary minesweeper (1940–45)
- Tonnage: 55 GRT, 19 NRT
- Length: 66 feet (20 m)
- Beam: 18.7 feet (5.7 m)
- Depth: 8.7 feet (2.7 m)
- Installed power: 120 bhp

Girl Pat was a small fishing trawler, based at the Lincolnshire port of Grimsby, that in 1936 was the subject of a media sensation when its captain took it on an unauthorised transatlantic voyage. The escapade ended in Georgetown, British Guiana, with the arrest of the captain, George "Dod" Orsborne, and his brother. The pair were later imprisoned for the theft of the vessel.

Built in 1935, Girl Pat was the property of the Marstrand Fishing Company of Grimsby. On 1 April 1936, Orsborne, with a crew of four and his brother James as a supernumerary, took the vessel out on what the owners authorised as a routine North Sea fishing trip of two to three weeks' duration. After leaving port, Orsborne informed the crew that they were going on an extended cruise in more southerly waters. Nothing more was heard of them until mid-May, when the owners, who had by then assumed the vessel lost, received invoices relating to its repair and reprovisioning in the northern Spanish port of Corcubión. Subsequent sightings placed her in the Savage Islands, at Dakar in Senegal, and Îles du Salut off the coast of French Guiana in South America. The captain's main means of navigation during a voyage of more than 6,000 nautical miles (11,000 km) was a sixpenny school atlas and a compass. At one point Girl Pat was reported wrecked in the Bahamas, with all hands lost. After the vessel's capture and detention following a chase outside Georgetown on 19 June, Orsborne and his crew were hailed as heroes in the world's press.

Charged with the theft of the vessel in October 1936, Orsborne maintained in court that the owners had instructed him to get rid of the ship, as part of a scheme to obtain its insurance value. This claim was dismissed by the court. Years later, in his memoirs, Orsborne told a different, uncorroborated story: in absconding with Girl Pat he had been carrying out a mission on behalf of British Naval Intelligence, connected with the outbreak of the Spanish Civil War in July 1936.

After his release from prison, Orsborne took part in further maritime adventures and served in the navy in the Second World War. He died in 1957. In Georgetown Girl Pat was acquired by new owners who returned her to Britain, where she was displayed as a tourist attraction in several resorts. In 1939 she was sold to the Port of London Authority for use as a wreck-marking vessel and, after being requisitioned by the Royal Navy during the war, was returned to the authority in 1945. There is no public record of her subsequent career.

== Background ==
=== Orsborne ===
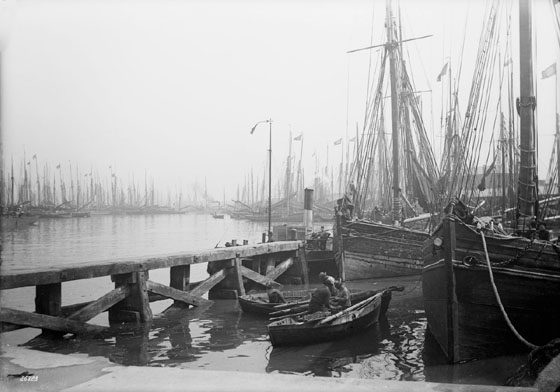
Grimsby fishing vessels, early 20th century

George Black Orsborne was born George Black on 4 July 1902, (Note: In his memoirs Orsborne gives 4 July 1918 as his 16th birthday. In 1936, at the time of the Girl Pat affair, most press accounts gave his age as 32, implying that he was born in 1903 or possibly 1904. At least one 1936 newspaper account reported an older age.) in the small north Scottish coastal town of Buckie. He assumed the Orsborne name when his widowed mother remarried and moved the family to Aberdeen, where George, nicknamed "Dod", spent his formative years. When he was 14, Orsborne lied about his age and enlisted as a Boy Seaman in the Royal Navy; in his memoirs he wrote: "I never did have an adolescence". He served in the Dover Patrol, and was wounded during the 1918 Zeebrugge Raid. After leaving the Navy in December 1919 and working ashore for a brief period, he was persuaded by a former captain of the Cutty Sark, Captain Wilkins, to go back to sea. He joined the merchant navy, sailing mainly in small ships based in Liverpool.

At 21 he passed his master's ticket examinations and took over his first command, a Grimsby trawler. During the following ten years, Orsborne said his career included "a bit of everything—rum-running, whaling, deep-sea trawling in the Arctic". In November 1935, back in Grimsby, he became skipper of the former seine fishing boat Gipsy Love, which its owners, the Marstrand Fishing Company, had converted into a trawler. (Note: The name of this fishing boat is often given as Gypsy Love, but its registered name was Gipsy Love, ON 164394.)

=== Crew and vessel ===
In March 1936, for his second voyage in Gipsy Love, Orsborne attempted to engage the services of an experienced seaman, Alexander MacLean, to whom he confided that the trip might go further afield—perhaps to Bermuda or South America—but MacLean declined the opportunity. Orsborne offered the mate's berth to Harry Stone, a local seaman who did not possess a mate's ticket but was told by Orsborne that he could use MacLean's number. The other crew members were a Yorkshireman, Hector Harris, and a 17-year-old Scottish cook, Howard Stephen (sometimes given as Stephens). The formal crew was joined by Orsborne's younger brother James, a grocer, who had no formal status on board and was later classified as a stowaway. Gipsy Love left Grimsby late in March 1936, supposedly to fish in the Dogger Bank area of the North Sea, but within hours had returned to port with engine trouble. With the consent of the owners, Orsborne transferred stores and crew to another Marstrand vessel, the small trawler Girl Pat; James Orsborne again joined them.

Built in 1935 in Oulton Broad, Suffolk, Girl Pat was a vessel of 55 gross registered tons (GRT), 19 NRT. She was 66 feet (20 m) long, with a beam of 18.7 feet (5.7 m), a hold depth of 8.7 feet (2.7 m), and accommodation for six. Some sources refer to her as a "seine netter", suggesting that like the Gipsy Love she had been converted to trawling. She was insured with underwriters for £3,000. Her regular engineer, George Jefferson, was added to Orsborne's picked crew for the forthcoming voyage.

== Voyage ==
=== First phase: Grimsby to Corcubión ===
Girl Pat left Grimsby on 1 April 1936. According to Stone's later account, when they entered the open sea, Orsborne assembled the crew—except for Jefferson—in the wheelhouse and told them that this would not be a normal fishing trip. Instead, he proposed to take the boat south, first calling at Dover where he would get rid of Jefferson, who was not included in his further plans. At this stage Orsborne was apparently undecided as to his longer-term intentions, but indicated that they would be sailing into southern waters and might go fishing for pearls.

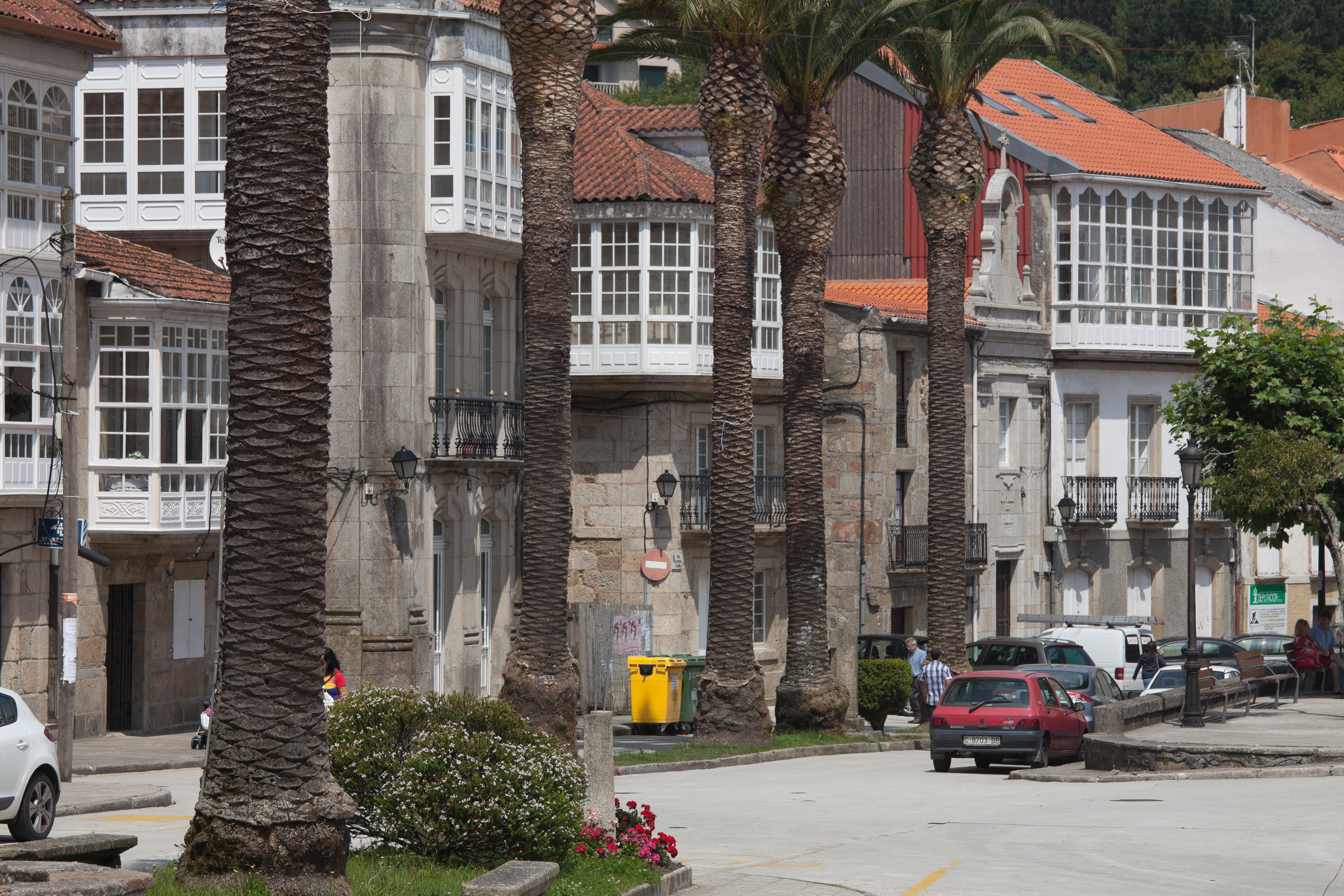
The northern Spanish town of Corcubión (photographed in 2011), where Girl Pat rested in April 1936

On 3 April the craft reached Dover, where Jefferson was taken ashore and given food and drink. When he returned to the harbour, Girl Pat had departed; the engineer returned in some confusion to Grimsby. As Girl Pat sailed into the English Channel, Orsborne revealed to his crew that the vessel contained no charts, and that future navigation would be dependent on a cheap school atlas that he showed them. He changed details in the boat's log book, entering himself as "G. Black," Stone as "H. Clark," and James Orsborne as "A. Black". After anchoring off Jersey in the Channel Islands to await calmer weather, Girl Pat proceeded southwards through the Bay of Biscay. Orsborne ordered changes to the boat's appearance: the bowsprit was altered, and the fishing registration number on the side of the hull was blacked out. According to Stone, Orsborne indicated an itinerary that included Madeira, the Canary Islands, the African coast and, eventually, Cape Town. They might then sell the boat and share the proceeds. Severe weather in the Bay of Biscay hampered progress and battered the small vessel, and on 12 April they took shelter in the small northern Spanish port of Corcubión, where they stayed for around 14 days. Necessary repairs were carried out, and the boat was reprovisioned. Orsborne instructed that the accounts for these services, totalling £235, be sent to Marstrand's in Grimsby, as their punishment, he later said, for letting the boat be taken out with inadequate stores and equipment.

Following Jefferson's return to Grimsby, Marstrand's were puzzled by Orsborne's actions, but initially thought that he had taken on another engineer in Dover and had gone fishing, perhaps in new grounds. There were unconfirmed sightings of Girl Pat in the Baltic Sea and elsewhere. As weeks passed with no definite news, the Marstrand directors assumed that the vessel was lost, either through foundering or barratry, and claimed insurance. They had already received sums totalling £2,400 from the underwriters, when they were surprised by the arrival of bills from Corcubión, together with the news that Girl Pat had sailed from the port on 24 April, her destination unknown.

=== Second phase: Corcubión to Dakar ===
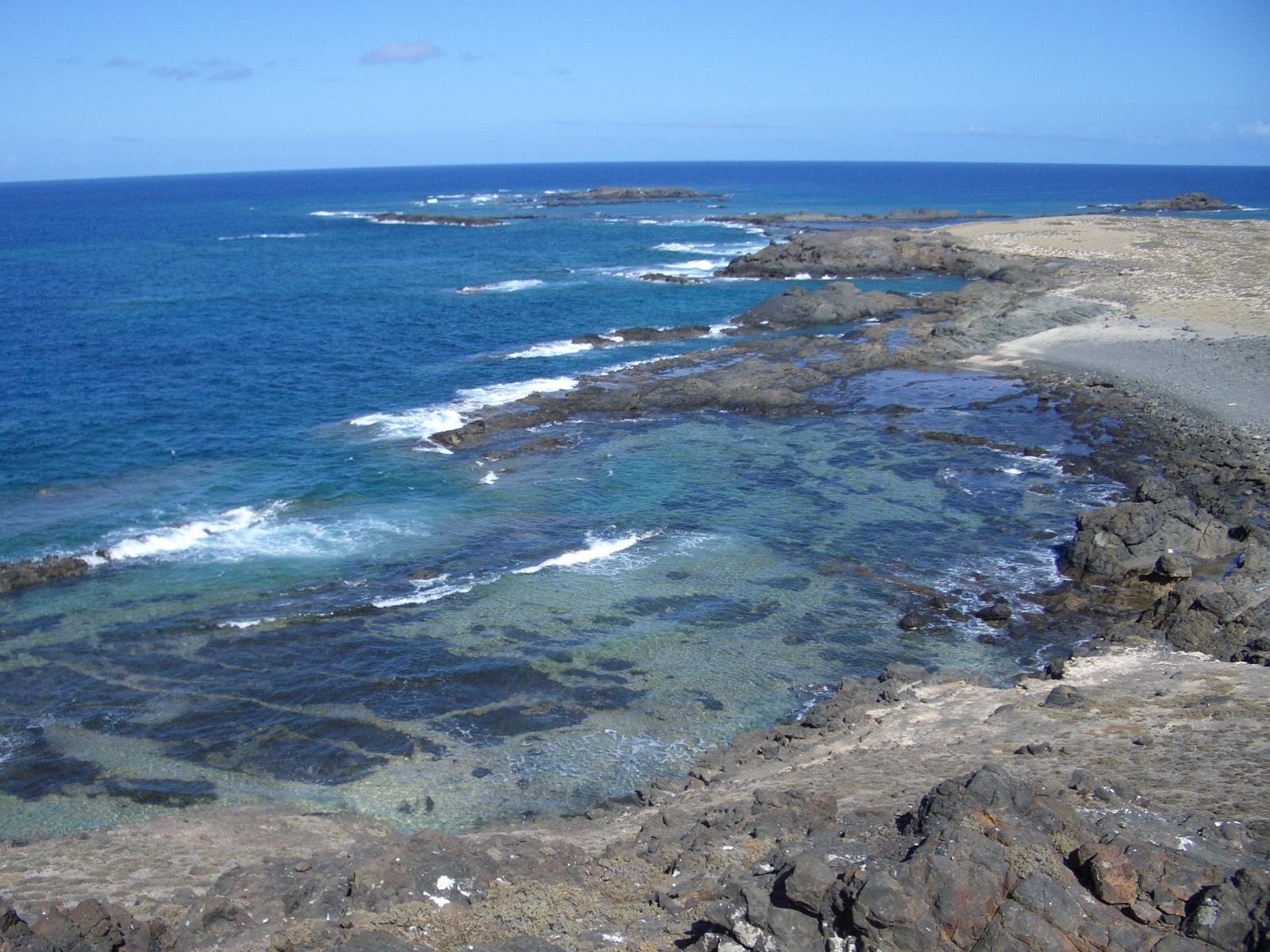
Reefs on the deserted coastline of the Savage Islands

After Girl Pat left Corcubión, there was speculation in the port that Orsborne intended to fish in the waters around Gibraltar, but there was no sighting of the vessel in that vicinity. Stone later recalled that after sailing for some time, they arrived at some uninhabited islands—this is consistent with a probable sighting by the British liner SS Avoceta, which on 17 May reported seeing a vessel closely matching the trawler's description, anchored in the Savage Islands. This small uninhabited archipelago, roughly 170 nautical miles (310 km) south of Madeira and roughly the same distance north of the Canary Islands, had long been associated with stories of pirates' buried treasure, and news that Girl Pat had been seen there gave rise to press speculation that she was engaged on a hunt for treasure. Lloyd's of London sent a representative to Las Palmas, to investigate the sighting; meanwhile Girl Pat made an unobserved call at Tenerife in the Canary Islands, where she was repainted.

Leaving Tenerife, Girl Pat continued her journey southward, following the African coast. According to Stone's account, the crew went ashore at Port Etienne in French West Africa (now Nouadhibou, in Mauritania), leaving the boat unguarded. While they were away, marauders stole gear and provisions, leaving the crew almost destitute: "All we had left to eat and drink were four bottles of water, a tin of corned beef, a bottle of lime juice and a tin of condensed milk". Leaving Port Etienne, they ran aground on a sandbank and were stranded for three days. Eventually they managed to refloat the vessel, and on 23 May were picked up by a pilot boat which brought them into the harbour at Dakar, starving and exhausted.

Stone had fallen ill with appendicitis during the previous leg of the voyage; he was hospitalised in Dakar and took no further part in the adventure. Orsborne was able to obtain further fuel and water, but Girl Pat's arrival attracted the attention of the local Lloyd's agent, who had been on the lookout for the vessel. On 26 May he saw Orsborne and inspected the log book, where he discovered the false names and other inconsistencies. Orsborne was asked to present the ship's papers at the British consulate but, on the pretext that he needed to test the engines, he rapidly put to sea. The appearance of Girl Pat in Dakar—the first confirmation since Corcubión that the vessel was still afloat—was widely reported. Relatives of the crew members were relieved that those aboard were safe but were apprehensive about what might lie ahead.

=== Third phase: Dakar to Georgetown ===
The level of public interest in the Girl Pat affair was enough for Gaumont British to consider making it the subject of a feature film. In the House of Commons on 29 May, the Parliamentary Secretary to the Board of Trade stated that no requests had been made for the detention of the vessel in foreign ports; two weeks later, Walter Runciman, the President of the Board of Trade, confirmed that, on behalf of the underwriters, the Foreign Office had asked that Girl Pat be refused credit and detained on entering any port.

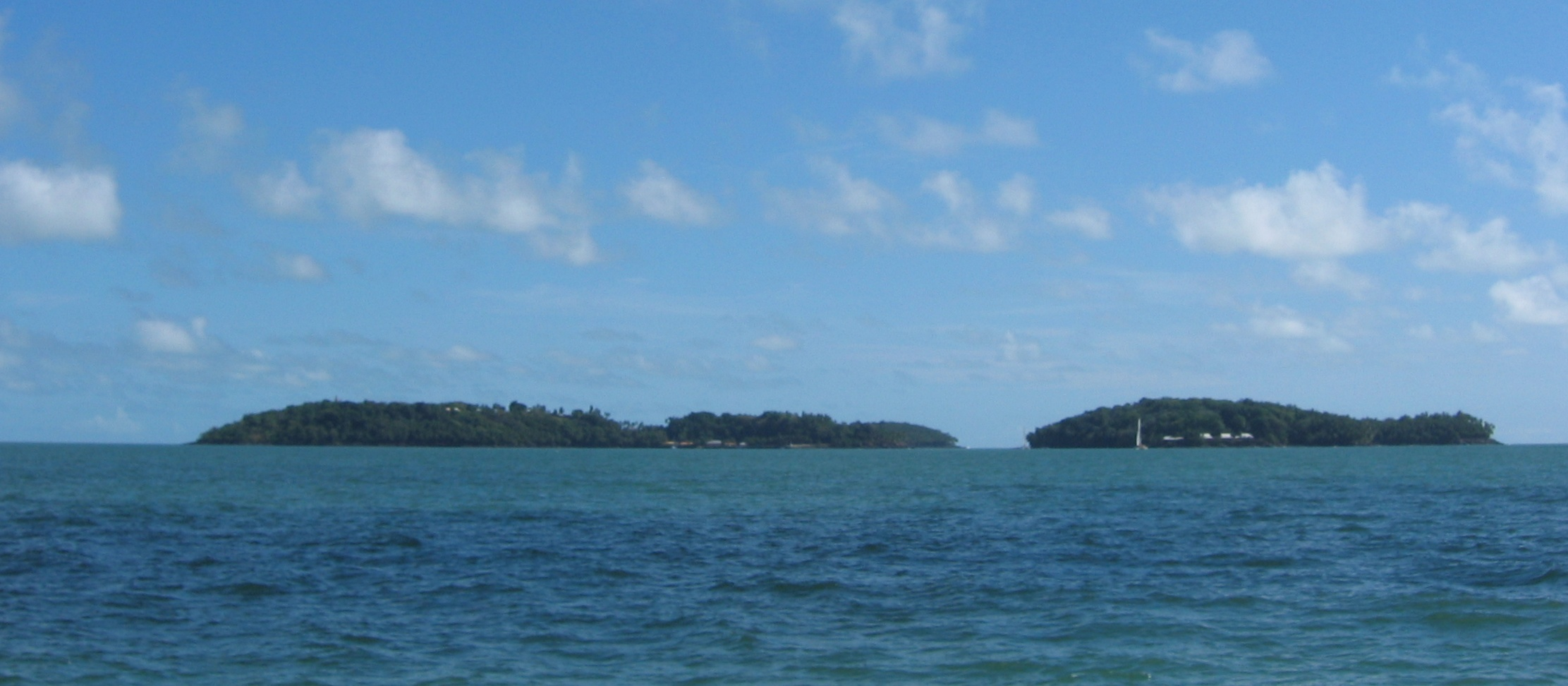
The Îles du Salut, where Girl Pat is believed to have watered after crossing the Atlantic

On 2 June the French liner Jamaique reported a small boat, flying the British flag and steaming southwards, near the Bissagos Islands 250 nautical miles (460 km) south of Dakar. Although this was at first assumed to be Girl Pat, the next reported sighting, on 9 June, was more than 2,000 nautical miles (3,700 km) to the west, on the other side of the Atlantic. Captain Jones of the Lorraine Cross, an American ship, cabled Lloyds' agents in Georgetown, British Guiana (now Guyana) with an account of a small ship flying a distress signal off the South American coast, 47 nautical miles (87 km) north-east of Cayenne. There were apparently four men on board. The boat's name and markings had been painted out, but she claimed to be the "Margaret Harold" bound for Trinidad from London. Jones thought the crew's behaviour suspicious, and when he asked to see the ship's papers, the ship lowered the distress signal and sped away. Jones said the vessel was "undoubtedly a British fisherman", and thought it was Girl Pat. In Grimsby, a Marstrand spokesman expressed little surprise at this new location, and confirmed that the ship had sufficient speed to have crossed the ocean in the time since her last confirmed sighting. A check with Lloyd's indicated that there was no registered ship named Margaret Harold.

A report from the Îles du Salut, a few miles off the coast of French Guiana, indicated that a vessel similar in appearance to Girl Pat had watered there on 10 June. An air search, by a Pan-American aircraft, covered over 1,000 miles (1,600 km) of coastline around Georgetown, without sighting the craft. On 17 June several newspapers carried reports of the discovery of the wreck of a small boat, and three bodies, at Atwood Cay, a small island in the Bahamas. Much of the press assumed this to be Girl Pat; one headline read "Did School Atlas Course Lead Crew to Death?". The reports proved false when, early in the morning of 19 June, a police launch towed Girl Pat into Georgetown harbour. (Note: The Bahamas authorities subsequently investigated a theory that the Atwood wreck might be the remains of the British cutter Altair, which disappeared while crossing the Atlantic in 1935.)

=== Capture, detention and arrest ===
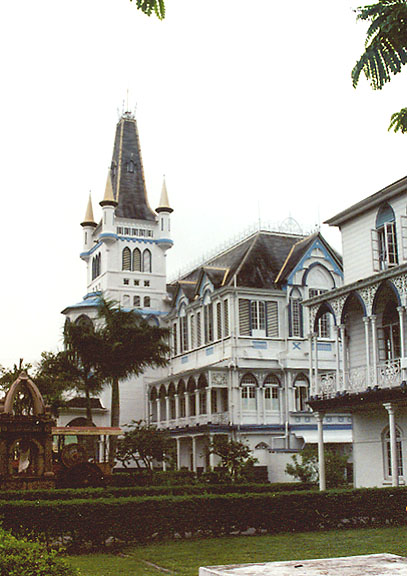
The City Hall, Georgetown

On the evening of 18 June the British steamer Arakaka had spotted a small ship a few miles outside Georgetown, and radioed this information to the shore. An unarmed police launch left Georgetown to investigate; as they approached, the crew of the as yet unidentified vessel became hostile. They denied that she was Girl Pat and threatened violence should officers attempt to board her. The launch retreated to Georgetown, where the police armed themselves and obtained authority to seize the suspect vessel. They returned early the following morning to find that their quarry was departing. A two-hour chase ensued, which The Hull Daily Mail glamorised as a sporting contest: "Like some coursing greyhound the faster Government ship stuck to the tail of the fleeing suspect which, harelike, doubled back on her course to dodge her pursuer". According to the British Daily Worker, the chase "[outdid] the most spectacular efforts of film directors". Finally, while manoeuvring at close quarters, the vessels collided. The stern of the suspect boat was severely damaged, whereupon she surrendered and was taken in tow. The name displayed on the vessel's hull was "Kia-ora", but Stephens quickly admitted to their captors that the ship was Girl Pat.

With Girl Pat secured and under guard in Georgetown harbour, the Orsborne brothers, Harris, and Stephens were taken to police headquarters in the City Hall. The police issued a statement that the four were there "at their own request. They are under no form of detention". In London, officials struggled to establish the exact legal position, and issued confusing statements. (Note: The Manchester Guardian of 22 June 1936 reported that Marstrand's intended to take no action against the crew. A Board of Trade official opined that the position was "obscure", but a future prosecution could not be ruled out. In Parliament, the Secretary of State for the Colonies reported that "a warrant for the arrest of the captain and the detention of the vessel was issued at the request of Lloyd's agent in Georgetown, but was subsequently withdrawn". The Secretary's lack of knowledge of the details of maritime law prevented him, he said, from explaining how Lloyds could have warrants issued, but that it was apparently withdrawn "because it eventually came quietly into port".) Meanwhile, Orsborne and his companions were widely hailed as heroes. The German newspaper Hamburger Fremdenblatt asked: "Is this not a bit of British tradition, to do the unconventional out of love for adventure, if great personal risks, audacity and romance are connected therewith?". A man from the town of Hull thought the adventure demonstrated "the spirit of Drake", and called for a public subscription to meet the crew's debts and expenses. An alternative view, expressed in the Hull Daily Mail, was to question whether the men should be regarded so favourably, or merely as "men who have run away with someone else's property".

Once released by the police, Harris and Stephens returned immediately to England, where they arrived on 13 July. The Orsborne brothers waited in Georgetown for their position to be clarified; George Orsborne told the press he was anxious to return home where, he insisted, many job offers were open to him. On 27 June, following further discussions in London, the brothers were arrested on a warrant issued under the Fugitive Offenders Act, and brought before the Georgetown magistrates, where they were charged with the theft of Girl Pat.

== Hearings, trial and sentence ==
=== In Georgetown ===
The brothers were held in custody, awaiting a deportation hearing. On 4 July they were remanded for a further week, and bail was again refused. Although the brothers declared their willingness to waive the deportation process and accept immediate transfer to England, they continued to be detained. On 22 July the hearings in the Georgetown magistrates' court finally began, with the formal identification of Girl Pat. On 24 July the magistrates ordered that the brothers be sent to England to face trial, once the formal approval of the colonial governor, Sir Geoffry Northcote, had been given. The governor was in no hurry to act; the Orsbornes finally left Georgetown on 13 August, when they boarded the cargo liner Inanda.

While the Orsbornes were in Georgetown, Harold Stone, Girl Pat's erstwhile mate, made his way home from Dakar and arrived in Liverpool on 20 July. After interviews with the police, Stone spoke to the press of the hardships suffered during the Girl Pat voyage, especially the shortages of food and water: "I would not want to go through the experience again". He confirmed that they had navigated using a school atlas, but added that they had possessed a compass.

=== Bow Street, London ===
Early on 2 September Inanda docked at Gravesend, Kent. The brothers were immediately driven to London for a formal appearance at Bow Street Magistrates' Court, where they were charged with theft and conspiracy. Against police opposition—because, they said, "certain developments" might arise—the magistrate bailed each defendant in the sum of £500, and required them to surrender their passports.

When the hearing resumed on 10 September, the court heard from Marstrands' managing director that George Orsborne had not been given authority to operate Girl Pat outside the North Sea. Stone testified that Orsborne had made plain his intentions to take the boat south from the outset, and also gave evidence concerning the changes to the ship's log. The court heard from Jefferson and other Dover witnesses, from Alexander MacLean, and from the Lloyd's agent in Dakar. The defence counsel did not answer the detailed aspects of the prosecution's case, but stated that at the forthcoming trial, "very serious allegations" would be made against certain of the prosecution witnesses. The brothers pleaded not guilty, and were remanded on continuing bail for trial at the Old Bailey. In the interval between the Bow Street hearings and the trial, which was set to begin in October, Girl Pat was sold.

=== Old Bailey ===
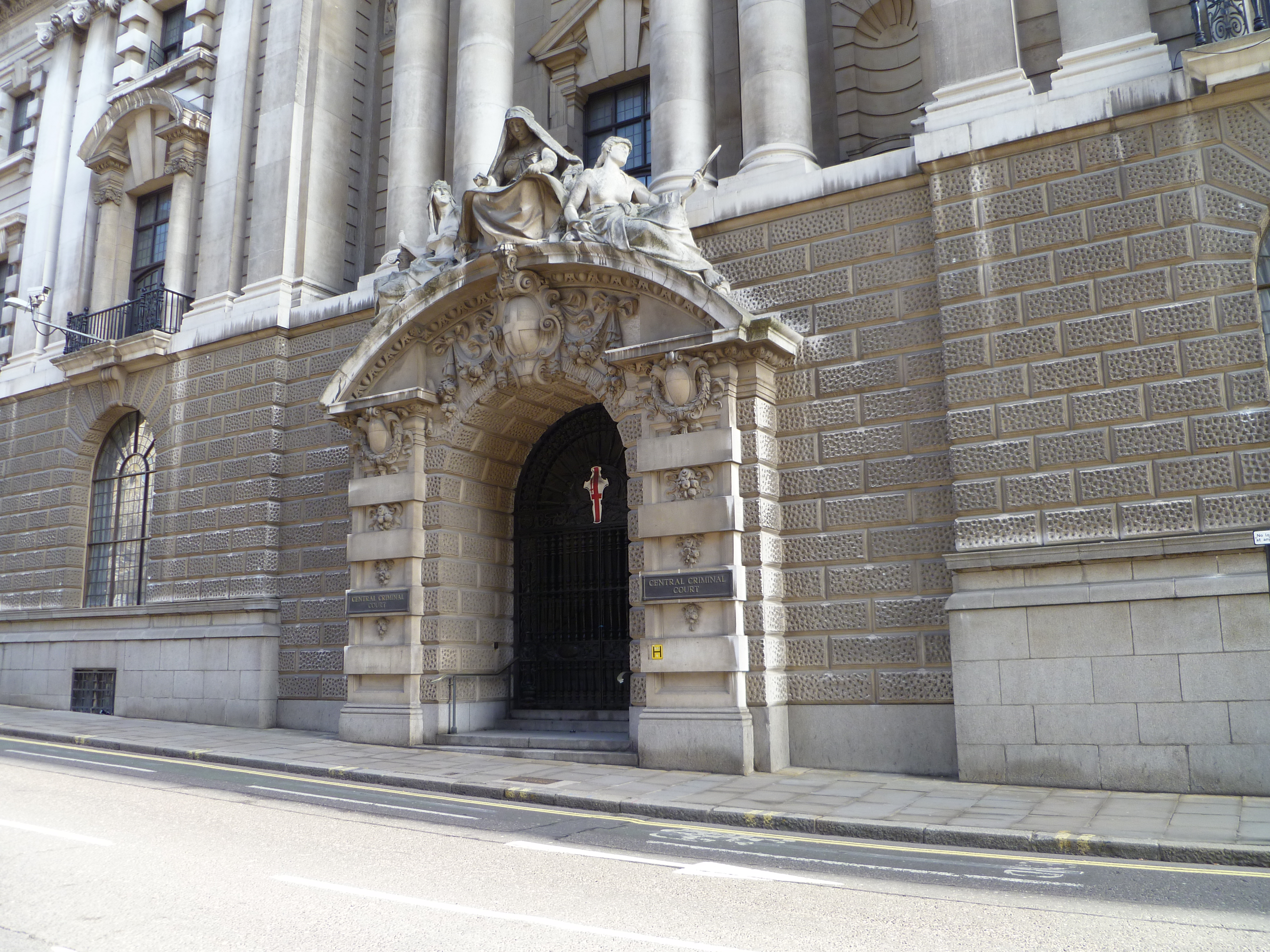
The entrance to the Central Criminal Courts at the Old Bailey

The Old Bailey trial began on 19 October 1936. The prosecution opened by stating that this should not be considered as "a cheerful buccaneering adventure," but as a breach of trust on the part of George Orsborne, to whom the owners had entrusted their ship. The objective of the voyage had not been to benefit the owners, but to make money for the defendants.

MacLean testified that in his discussions with George Orsborne, he had formed the impression that the captain was part-owner of the vessel. Orsborne had mentioned to him the possibility of engaging in profitable activities such as gun-running and smuggling. (Note: MacLean, who turned down Orsborne's offer to join Girl Pat and played no part in the adventure, nevertheless claimed to an Australian newspaper in 1937 that he had been part of the crew that sailed with Orsborne, but had "succeeded in getting away some time before she was arrested".) John Moore, the managing director of Marstrand's, stated that he had expected Orsborne to take Girl Pat fishing in an area of the North Sea where another Marstrand vessel was fishing successfully. When Moore was cross-examined, the defence's "serious allegations" were revealed. It was put to Moore that he had instructed George Orsborne not to go fishing, but to get rid of the vessel so that the company could claim its insurance value, of which Orsborne would be rewarded with a share. The defence alleged that the company was in poor financial shape, and that its ships were heavily mortgaged. Moore denied that he had made any such suggestion to Orsborne. The company, he insisted, was financially sound, the mortgages on its vessels were relatively low, and he had never discussed insured values with Orsborne. The defence further alleged that when taken out Girl Pat had been in an unseaworthy condition, inadequately provisioned and unfit for a normal fishing voyage. This suggestion was also denied by Moore.

After Stone and Jefferson reprised the evidence they had given in Bow Street, George Orsborne took the stand. He said he had not agreed to Moore's proposal to "lose" the vessel, and after departing with Girl Pat had still been undecided about what he would do. He had left Jefferson in Dover because he was a poor mechanic and a drunk. Moore, he asserted, was mistaken in claiming that the boat's provisions and equipment were adequate. Orsborne said that while the boat was sheltering in Jersey, he had suggested to the crew that they "may as well make a holiday of it", and then proposed that they make a circle of the Atlantic Ocean before returning to Grimsby. There was no intention to fall in with Moore's scheme or to steal the vessel; they would "thank the owners for the loan of the ship" and return it. Orsborne added that while they were in port at Corcubión, he was offered money for Girl Pat, but turned it down. Orsborne denied that he had tried to conceal his or the boat's true identity in Dakar, or had left the port to avoid enquiries—the sudden departure was due, he said, to troubles with the natives. Nor had he attempted to evade the authorities in Georgetown; his movements there had arisen from concern for the safety of his vessel, which was being jeopardised by the manoeuvres of the police launch.

James Orsborne, giving evidence, said that he had learned from his brother about Moore's proposal to get rid of the boat, and had told George that he would be "a darned fool" even to consider the suggestion. He had stayed with his brother because "I thought that if he was going to do anything crazy I might manage to prevent him". Recalled to the witness box, Moore said that he had refused to employ James Orsborne because he considered him dishonest.

In his closing speech, defence counsel said that the key to the case was whether the Orsborne brothers intended to deprive the owners permanently of their vessel. The evidence, he said, was more suggestive of a "joy-ride half-way round the world", than of theft or anything more sinister. Prosecuting counsel argued that if the month's joy-ride was the innocent explanation, why had it been necessary to introduce into the case the unfounded allegations of proposed insurance fraud "against men whose reputations were above suspicion?". In his summing up, the judge condemned the arrangements whereby the Orsbornes were receiving money from the press for the rights to their story. This was unwarranted and undesirable: "Whether the two prisoners be guilty or innocent [of theft], the property of someone else was being used by them without permission ...George Orsborne clearly knew that he was acting directly against his employer's interests". The jury was out for only 35 minutes before returning guilty verdicts against both defendants. On 22 October George Orsborne was sentenced to 18 months' imprisonment, and James to 12 months.

=== Orsborne's alternative account ===
Thirteen years after the trial, in a memoir entitled Master of the Girl Pat published by Doubleday, George Orsborne provided a new context for the Girl Pat voyage. According to this narrative, he had been recruited in 1935 to work for British Naval Intelligence. The Girl Pat venture was a secret assignment, connected with the imminent Spanish Civil War. Between the stops at Corcubión and Dakar, Orsborne claims, he carried out a mission to blow up a railway bridge in Spanish Morocco. The stops at Port Etienne, Dakar and elsewhere had been to receive further instructions from Naval Intelligence. In this later account Orsborne changes crew names and other details: Stone becomes "Fletcher", and his leaving the voyage in Dakar is recorded by Orsborne as a "desertion". Some of Orsborne's dates are inconsistent with the boat's known movements—he gives 26 June as the date of arrival in Dakar, and the account he gives of his Old Bailey trial bears no relation to the published record. Orsborne describes his stay in Wormwood Scrubs prison as "a wonderful experience. I wouldn't have missed it for anything".

== Aftermath ==
It is difficult not to entertain a sneaking gratitude towards the two men whose curious and unsuccessful adventure has sent us all vicariously sailing on a desperate mission across tropic seas ... Apart from the length of their voyage and their happy-go-lucky methods, they maintained to the end an air that was at once tough and enigmatic.

— The Times leading article, 23 October 1936.

After the trial, the press and public remained broadly sympathetic to the Orsborne brothers. During the committal stages The Spectator had commented that the adventure "had given romantic satisfaction to the whole world" and that her captain had become a national hero. On the day after the sentencing, The Times leading article noted the public's sustained pleasure in the escapade. Nearly 30 years later, in his social history of the between-the-wars years, Ronald Blythe portrayed the affair as an anti-establishment gesture, "a colourful snook cocked in the face of some of the most soul-crippling officialdom ever experienced by ordinary men and women".

While in prison, George Orsborne lent his name to a ghost-written account of the Girl Pat adventure, which repeated the claim that the vessel had been sent out inadequately equipped and provisioned. Marstrand's successfully sued the publishers, Hutchinsons, and two newspapers which had repeated the details. On his release, Orsborne planned to make a single-handed transatlantic crossing in an open boat, but the trip was delayed, and finally cancelled when war began in September 1939. (Note: According to Orsborne, a small sailing boat was built to his specification, capable of crossing from Southampton to New York in 60 days. Orsborne also records that the boat, the Little Elizabeth, was destroyed during an air raid in 1940.) Likewise, nothing came of an announcement in 1938 that Orsborne would lead an expedition to the Caribbean and up the Amazon.

During the war, Orsborne worked as mate on a trawler which formed part of Britain's anti-invasion force, before rejoining the Royal Navy. His wartime exploits included service as a beachmaster during the Normandy landings of June 1944, a spell as a commando in Combined Operations, and service in the Far East, where he records being captured and imprisoned by the Japanese. In September 1947 Orsborne was one of two men rescued in mid-Atlantic from the abandoned ketch Lovely Lady; the other was a stowaway, a Spanish greengrocer.

In his 1949 memoir Master of the Girl Pat, George Orsborne records briefly that Stephens went straight back to sea after the adventure, that Harris drank up his share of the crew's newspaper money, and that "Fletcher" (Stone) emigrated to Australia. James Orsborne worked for a while in the Mediterranean, assisting refugees from the Spanish Civil War. Later he went to Canada. He was in Singapore when it fell to the Japanese in February 1942, and was not heard from again. George Orsborne died on 23 December 1957, at Belle Île off the Brittany coast, while delivering a motor-cruiser from Nice to England.

=== Later years of ship ===
Girl Pat was repaired and refitted in Georgetown by her new owners, the Grimsby-based firm Girl Pat Ltd, and was brought back to England, arriving at Portsmouth on 9 May 1937 She remained there for two weeks as a tourist attraction, before moving to London on 28 May. Her new owners declared that they were still undecided as to the ship's longer-term future, but for the time being she would be displayed at Blackpool and other holiday resorts. On 17 February 1939 The Times reported that Girl Pat had been sold to the Port of London Authority (PLA), to be used as a wreck-marking vessel. After the outbreak of war in September 1939, she was requisitioned by the Admiralty for naval use, and is listed as one of the "minor war vessels" in service in July 1940. By 1945 she had been returned to the PLA; there is no public record of her subsequent history. The name Girl Pat was adopted by at least one later registered vessel; in August 1966 a 60-ton yacht of that name was arrested by Greek coastguards in the Gulf of Corinth and its occupants charged with the theft of antiquities.

== Notes and references ==
=== Sources ===
==== Books ====
- Blythe, Ronald (1964). The Age of Illusion. Harmondsworth, UK: Penguin Books. OCLC 493484388.
- Hewitson, Jim (2005). Skull and Saltire. Edinburgh: Black & White Publishing. ISBN 978-1-84502-026-2.
- Neillands, Robin; De Normann, Roderick (1993). D-Day 1944: Voices from Normandy. London: Weidenfeld and Nicolson. ISBN 0-297-81251-3.
- Orsborne, Dod (1949). Master of the Girl Pat. New York: Doubleday. OCLC 1151423.
