= Yvan Ponton =

Canadian actor, commentator, and TV host (born 1945)

- Born: 22 October 1945 (age 80); Farnham, Quebec, Canada
- Occupations: Actor; commentator; television host

Yvan Ponton (born 22 October 1945) is a Canadian actor, commentator and television host. Ponton has had a lengthy acting career which includes roles in a variety of major French-Canadian television shows and movies. He is most well known to English-speaking audiences for his role as Jean-Guy Drouin in the 1977 film Slap Shot.

== Background ==
Ponton was born in Farnham, Quebec. Ponton's acting career started in the early 1970s when he appeared in the television series Mont-Joye for five years. He would also appear in other significant Quebec series such as Ent'Cadieux, Diva, Jasmine and Zap.

In his film career, his first notable acting role was in the 1977 film Slap Shot featuring Paul Newman and the Hanson Brothers when he played the role of Jean-Guy Drouin.

His second role was as Jacques Mercier, in the television series Lance et Compte (He Shoots, He Scores in English) which started with three seasons from 1987 to 1989 before doing three more seasons from 2002 to 2006. He was the coach during the first season of the Quebec Nationals, an imitation of the defunct Quebec Nordiques (now Colorado Avalanche) of the National Hockey League. After being coach, he worked as a commentator. In Lance et Compte: La Reconquete, he was named the coach of the Montreal Canadiens.

Another major role was in all four Les Boys films in which he played the role of Jean-Charles, an openly gay lawyer and a defenseman for a garage hockey league team. Ponton, as was in Lance et Compte played along with several known Quebec actors including Marc Messier, Patrick Huard, Rémy Girard, Pierre Lebeau, Maxim Roy, Serge Thériault, Michel Barrette, Eric Lapointe and Paul Houde. A television series from the film aired on Radio-Canada during the Fall of 2007. In 1991 Yvan starred as the villain in the sci-fi cult film Scanners II: The New Order. Yvan had a recurring role as RCMP Inspector André Cormier on the CBC drama North of 60 in the 1990s.

Ponton is also the chief referee and the host of an improvisation game called Ligue Nationale d'Improvisation which airs on Télé-Québec since 1977. He was later the host of a quiz game called Ultimatum in the early 2000s which aired on TVA. He is also the host of a 30-minute show called 30 Images/Seconde, a review of some of the best recent sports plays in various sports, which airs on RDS. He's also been the play-by-play commentator for professional tennis matches on the same network since 1993 including coverage of the ATP's and WTA's four major tennis tournaments, the Australian Open, the French Open, Wimbledon and the US Open.

Ponton also taught dramatic arts for 15 years.

== Mediagraphy ==
=== Television series ===
- Mont-Joye (1970–1975)
- Y'a pas de problème (1975–1977)
- Vanderburg (1983)
- Lance et Compte (1987–1989, 2002–2006)
- L'or et le papier (1989–1990, 1992)
- Le Saga d'Archibald (1991)
- La misère des riches (1992)
- Bethune: The making of a hero (1993)
- Zap' (1993–1996)
- North of 60 (1993–1996)
- Ent'Cadieux (1993–1999)
- Jasmine (1996)
- Diva (1997)
- Les Boys (TV series) (2007)
- The Foundation (2009)

=== Films ===
- Slap Shot (1977)
- The Fighting Man (1977)
- Pouvoir intime (1986)
- Henri (1986)
- Hold-Up (1986)
- Cold Front (1989)
- Bethune: The Making of a Hero (1990)
- Scanners II: The New Order (1991)
- Les Boys (I through IV) (1997, 1998, 2001, 2005) and its prequel Il était une fois les Boys (2013)
- Air speed (1998)
- In the Blue Ground (1998)
- Trial by Fire (1999)
- Le Collectionneur (2002)
- Lance et Compte Le Film (2010)

== External links/References ==
- Yvan Ponton at IMDb
- Biography (Courtesy of RDS) (in French)
