= Dod Orsborne =

British sailor (1902–1957)

George Black "Dod" Orsborne (4 July 1902 – 23 December 1957) was a British trawler captain and seafarer, who acquired notoriety in 1936 when he took the trawler Girl Pat on an unauthorised voyage across the Atlantic. The escapade attracted much press attention, and Orsborne and his crew were briefly hailed as heroes. Orsborne was tried and imprisoned for the theft of the trawler; subsequently he claimed that the voyage had been part of an undercover operation organised by British Naval Intelligence.

Orsborne served in the Royal Navy in both world wars. He published an account of his adventurous life in 1949.

== Early life ==
George Black Orsborne was born George Black on 4 July 1902, (Note: In his memoirs Orsborne gives 4 July 1918 as his 16th birthday. In 1936, at the time of the Girl Pat affair, most press accounts gave his age as 32, implying that he was born in 1903 or 1904. At least one 1936 newspaper account reported an older age.) in the small north Scottish coastal town of Buckie. He assumed the Orsborne name when his widowed mother remarried and moved the family to Aberdeen, where George, nicknamed "Dod", spent his formative years. When he was 14 Orsborne lied about his age and enlisted as a Boy Seaman in the Royal Navy. He served in the Dover Patrol, and was wounded during the 1918 Zeebrugge Raid. After leaving the Royal Navy in December 1919 he worked ashore for a brief period before joining the merchant navy. By the time he was 21 he had passed his master's ticket examinations; his first command was of a Grimsby trawler.

== Trawler skipper ==
For the following ten years, Orsborne led a varied maritime career which included "a bit of everything—rum-running, whaling, deep-sea trawling in the Arctic". His exploits included searching for traces of the American aviator Paul Redfern, who disappeared on a flight over the Brazilian jungle in 1927, and later adventures in the Arabian Sea and the Indian Ocean. At some stage—Orsborne's memoirs do not provide a date—he married, and according to newspaper accounts managed to father eight children, in spite of his own statement that he saw little of his wife after their marriage. In November 1935, back in Grimsby, he became skipper of the former seine fishing boat Gypsy Love, which its owners, the Marstrand Fishing Company, had converted into a trawler.

== Girl Pat adventure ==
In April 1936, Orsborne and a crew of four, with his younger brother James as an unauthorised passenger, left Grimsby in another Marstrand trawler, the Girl Pat, in what was supposed to be a normal North Sea fishing trip. However, after leaving port Orsborne informed the crew that they would be going on an extended cruise in more southerly waters. Nothing more was heard of them until mid-May when the owners, who had by then assumed the vessel lost, received invoices relating to its repair and reprovisioning in the north Spanish port of Corcubión late in April. Subsequent sightings placed her in the Savage Islands, at Dakar in Senegal, and Îles du Salut off the South American coast. Her only means of navigation during more than 6,000 miles of voyaging was a sixpenny school atlas. At one point Girl Pat was reported wrecked in the Bahamas, with all hands lost. After the vessel's capture and detention following a chase outside Georgetown, British Guiana, Orsborne and his crew were hailed as heroes by much of the world's press. Back in England, Orsborne was tried for the theft of the Girl Pat and sentenced to 18 months' imprisonment. Many years later, in his memoirs, Orsborne made the uncorroborated claim that the voyage was an undercover operation carried out on behalf of British Naval Intelligence, with the aim of undermining General Franco's rebellion against the Spanish government, in the run-up to the Spanish Civil War.

== Later career ==
On his release from prison, Orsborne announced plans to make a single-handed transatlantic crossing in an open boat. A Hull trawlerman challenged him to make a race of it, but neither the crossing nor the race took place. (Note: According to Orsborne, a small sailing boat was built to his specification, capable of crossing from Southampton to New York in 60 days. The venture was delayed by the war, and the boat, the Little Elizabeth, was destroyed during an air raid in 1940.) Late in 1938 it was announced that Orsborne would lead an expedition to the Caribbean and up the Amazon, but nothing came of this. With the advent of war in 1939, Orsborne worked as mate on a trawler which formed part of Britain's anti-invasion force. Later he served as a commando in Combined Operations. At the end of 1944 he was sent to the Far East, where he was captured and imprisoned by the Japanese. He returned home in March 1946, and in September 1947 was one of two persons rescued in mid-Atlantic from the abandoned ketch Lovely Lady; the other was a stowaway, a Spanish greengrocer. In 1949 Orsborne published a colourful account of his life, Master of the Girl Pat. He went to South America in the early 1950s; in November 1952 he arrived in Trinidad with stories of mistreatment and torture in a Venezuelan prison.

George Orsborne died on 23 December 1957, at Belle Île off the Brittany coast, while transporting a motor cruiser from Nice to England. En route, he had been attacked on the dockside at Bordeaux; the injuries he sustained may have contributed to his sudden death.

== Books ==
- Orsborne, Dod (1949). Master of the Girl Pat. New York: Doubleday. OCLC 1151423.
