= Constant Dutilleux =

French painter

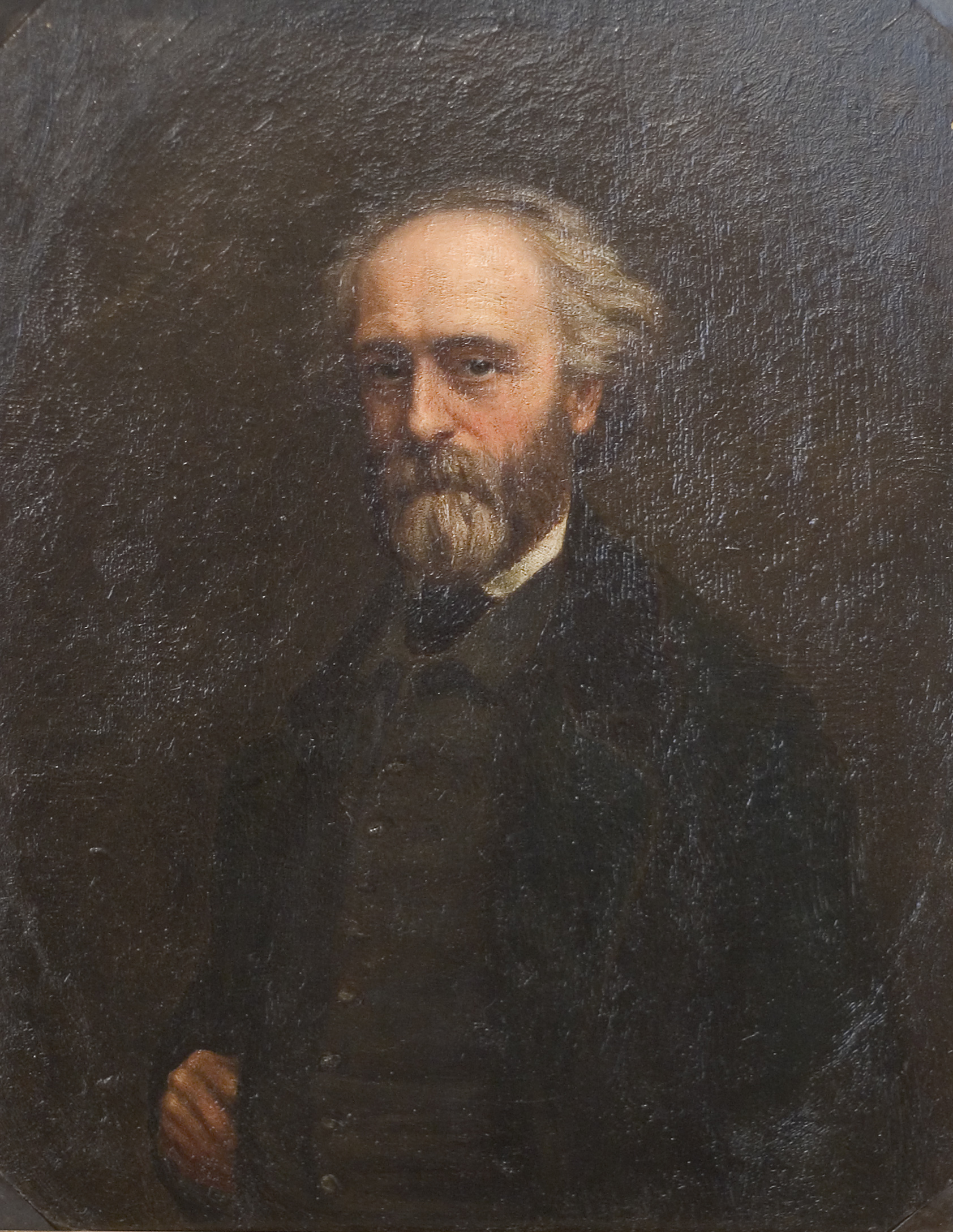
- Self portrait (Musée des beaux-arts d'Arras)
- Born: Henri-Joseph-Constant Dutilleux; 5 October 1807; Douai, France
- Died: 21 October 1865 (aged 58); Paris, France
- Known for: Painting, illustrating, engraving

Constant Dutilleux (5 October 1807 - 21 October 1865) was a 19th-century French painter, illustrator and engraver. He was the great-grandfather of the composer Henri Dutilleux.

Dutilleux preferred landscape paintings. He was mainly influenced by Eugène Delacroix and Jean-Baptiste-Camille Corot.

== Works on public display ==
In 2006, his works toured France as part of an exhibition on Constant Dutilleux, Alfred Robaut and Eugène Delacroix.

- Hêtraie dans la forêt de Fontainebleau, Palais des Beaux-Arts de Lille
- Le peintre Désiré Dubois peignant en plein air (oil on canvas), Musée des beaux-arts d'Arras
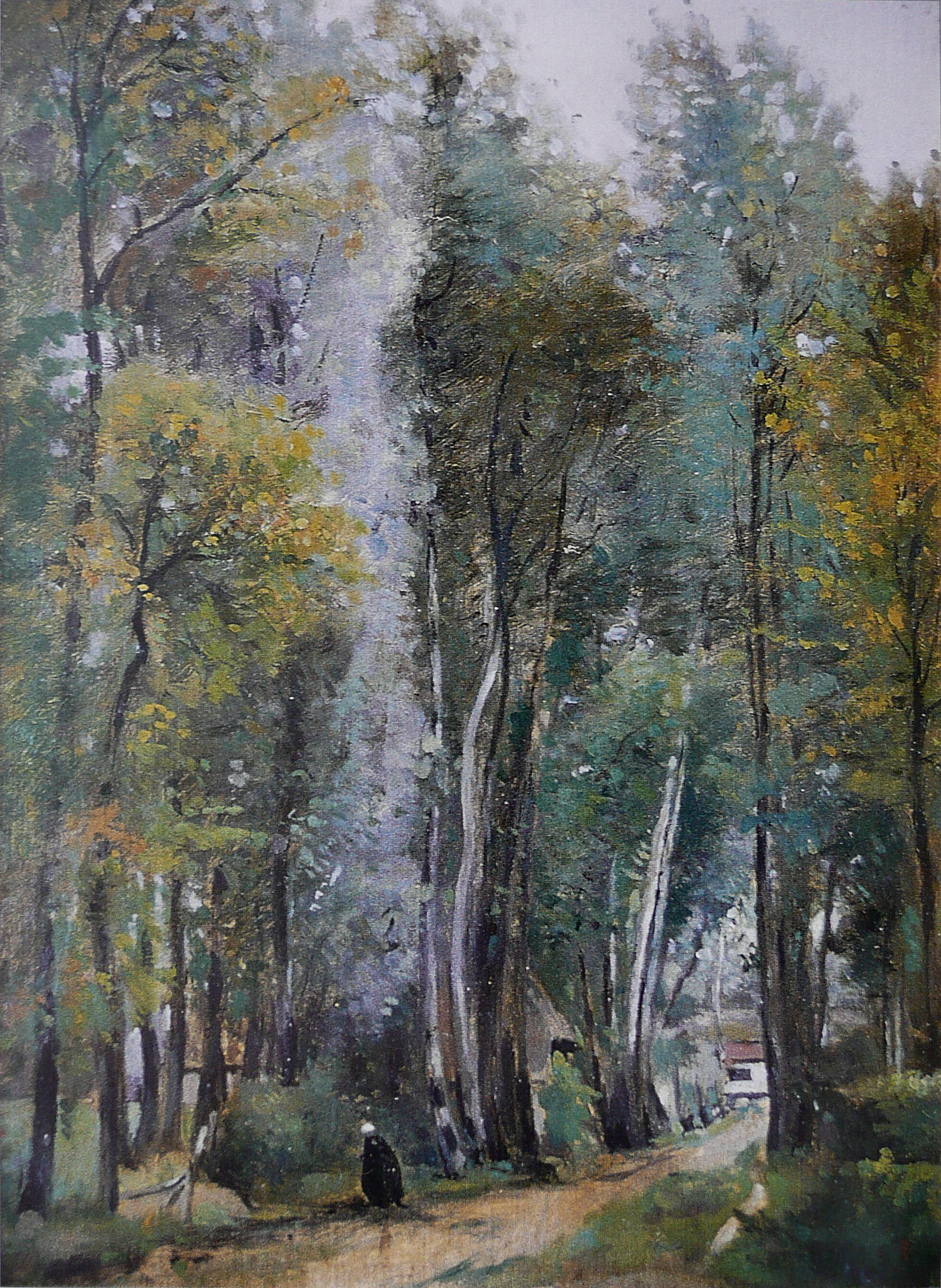
Vue de la rue de Crambious, près de Fleurbaix (private collection)

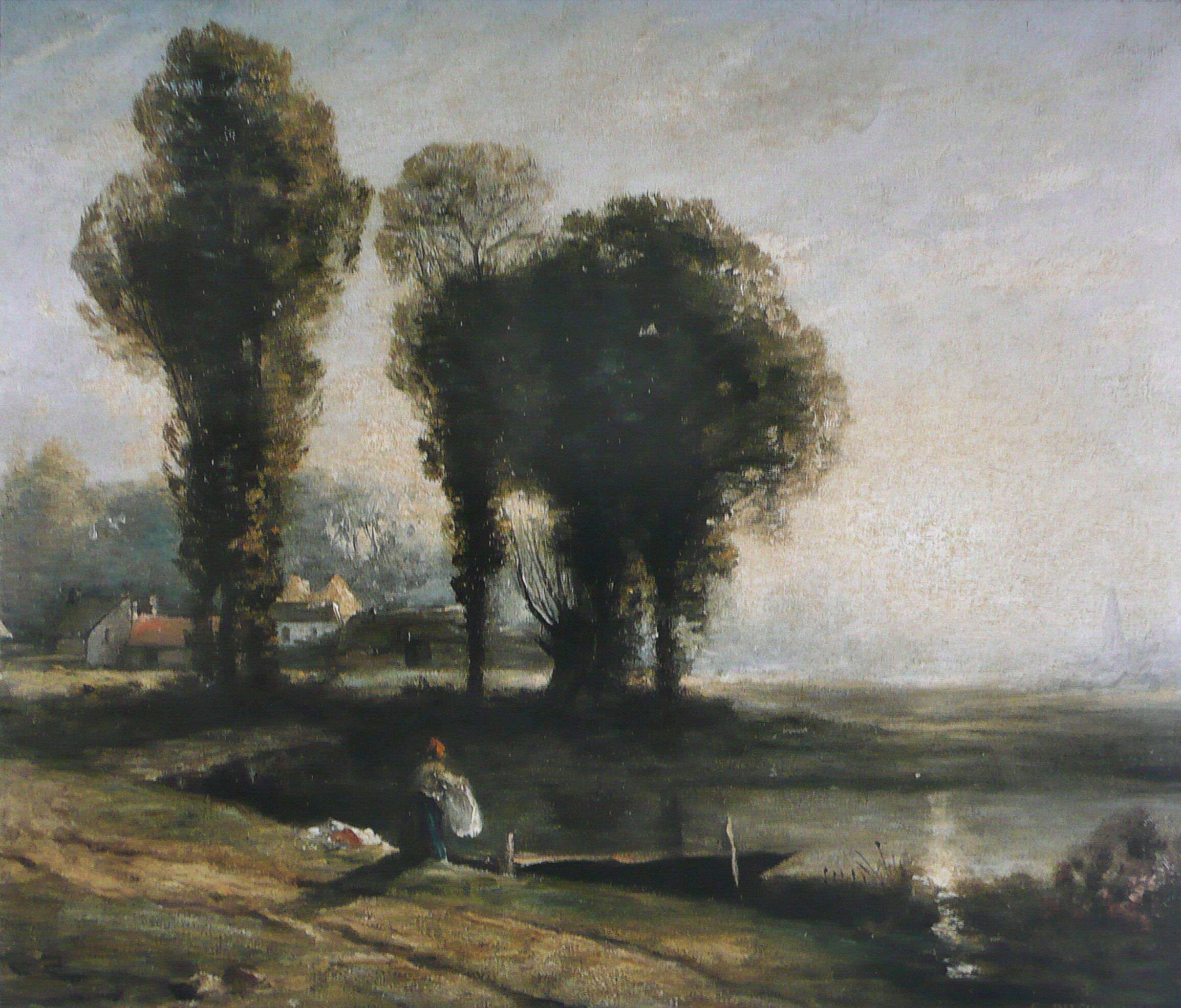
Bord de Scarpe (1860), Musée des Beaux-Arts d’Arras

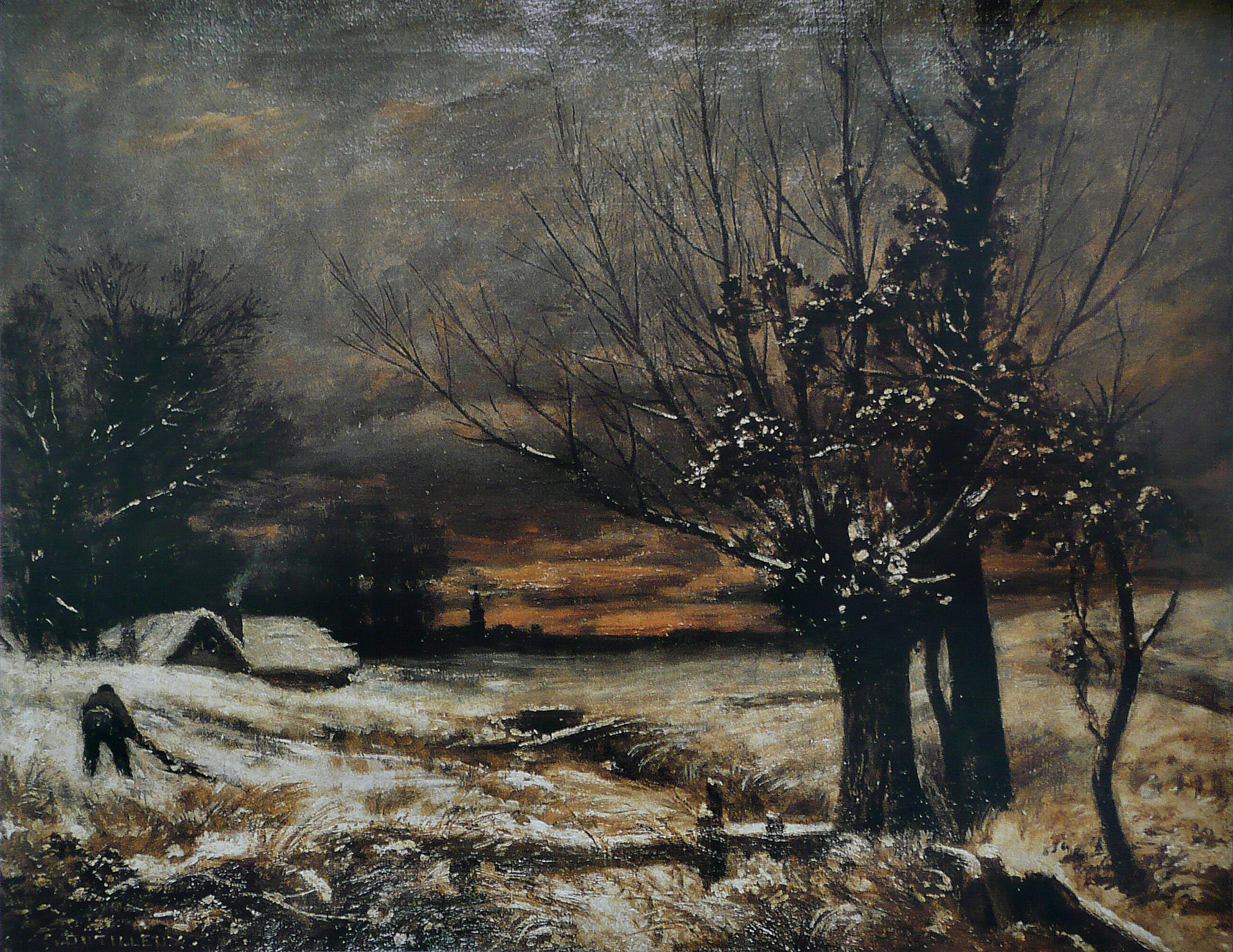
Effects of Snow (1865), Musée de la Chartreuse de Douai

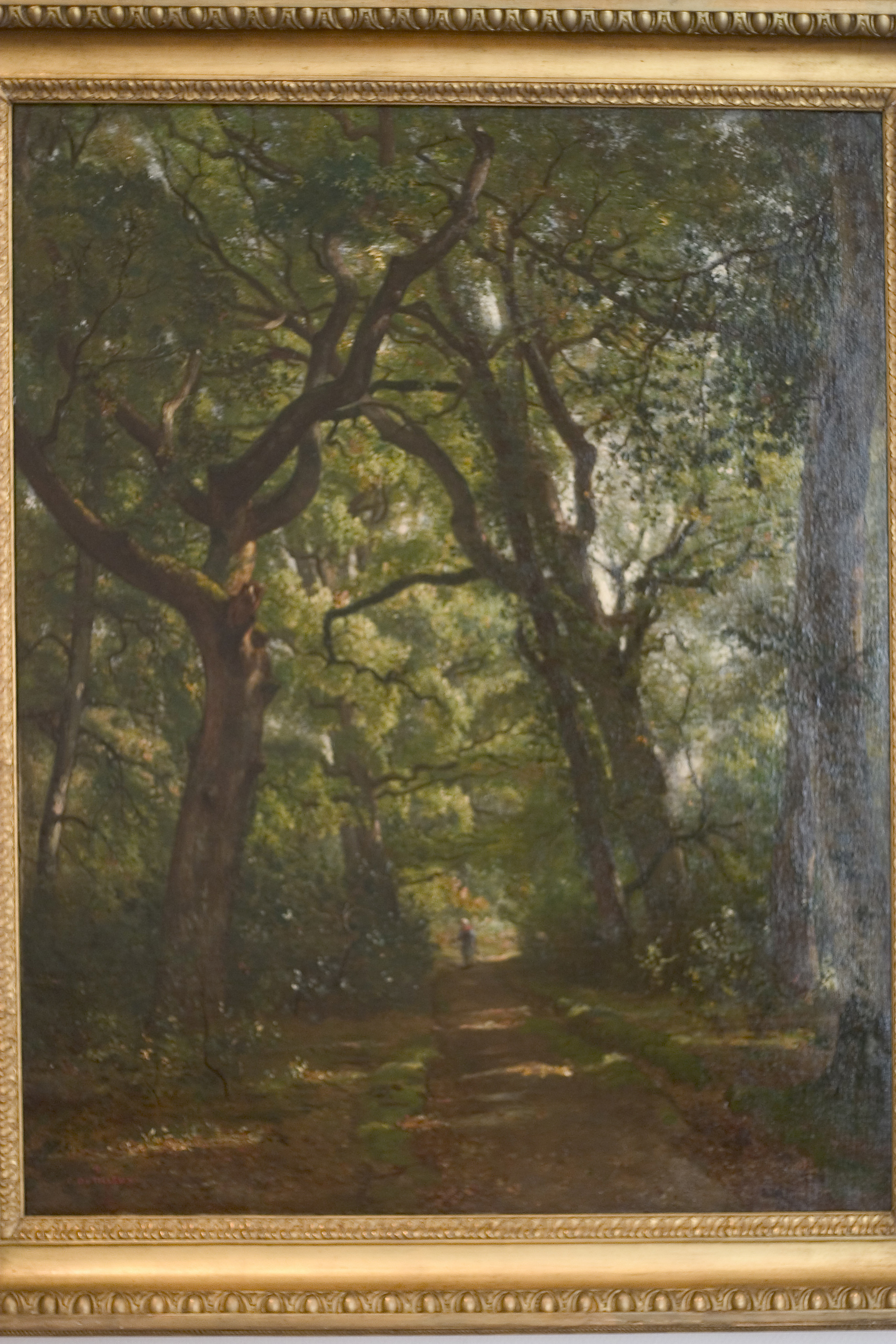
Path in the Forest, Musée des Beaux-Arts d’Arras
