= Musée des beaux-arts d'Arras =

Museum in Arras, France

Musée des Beaux-Arts d'Arras
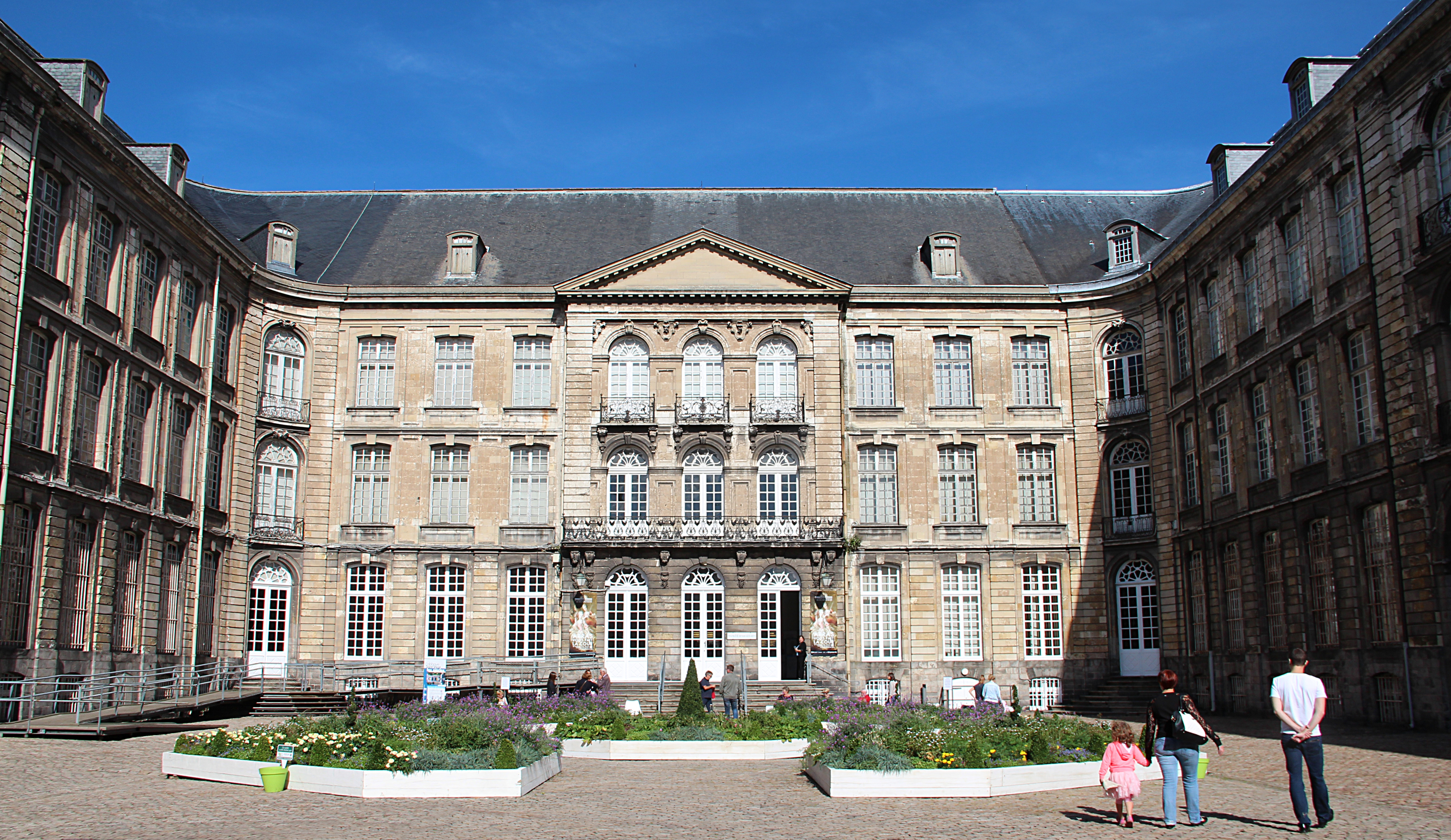

- Location within France
- Established: 1825
- Location: Arras, Nord-Pas-de-Calais, France
- Coordinates: 50.35756944°N 3.530763889°E
- Visitors: 36,415 (2003) 52,467 (2004) 29,533 (2005) 28,265 (2006) 28,328 (2007)

The Musée des Beaux-Arts d'Arras is located in the old Abbey of St. Vaast in Arras, in the Nord-Pas-de-Calais, France.

== Collection ==
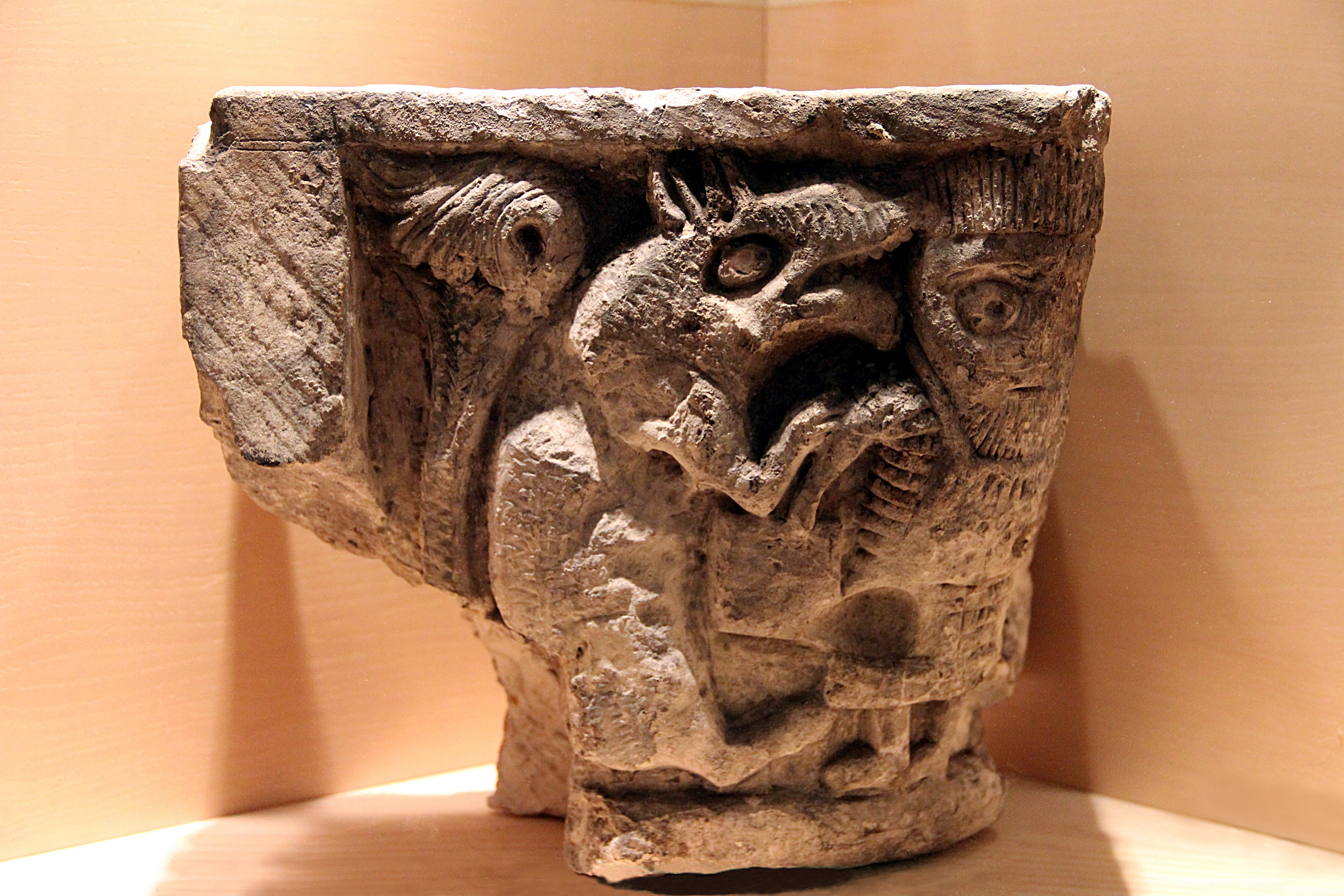
Fragment of a capital, representing "Avarice",(12th century)

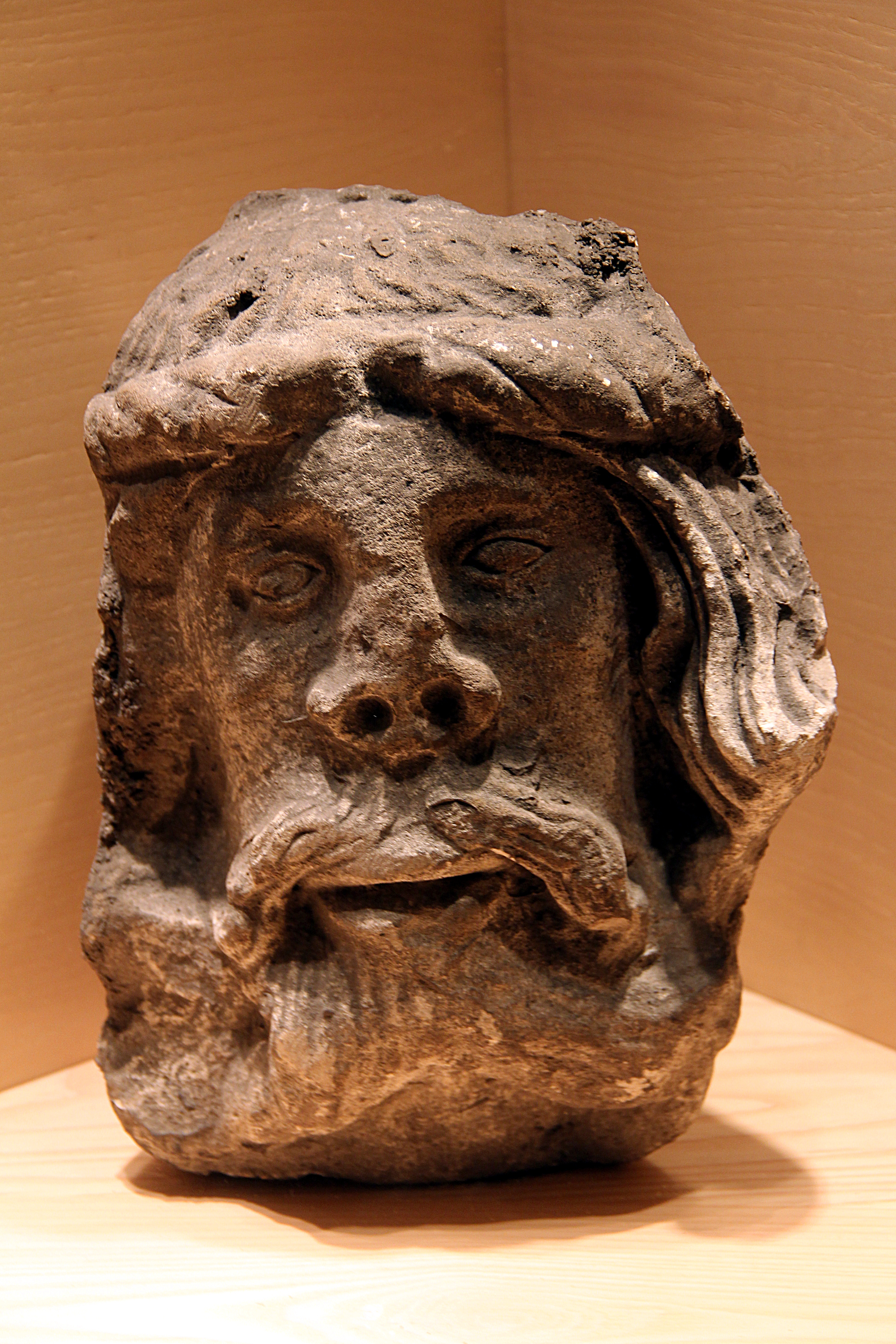
Head of Christ, fragment of a stone sculpture (13th century)

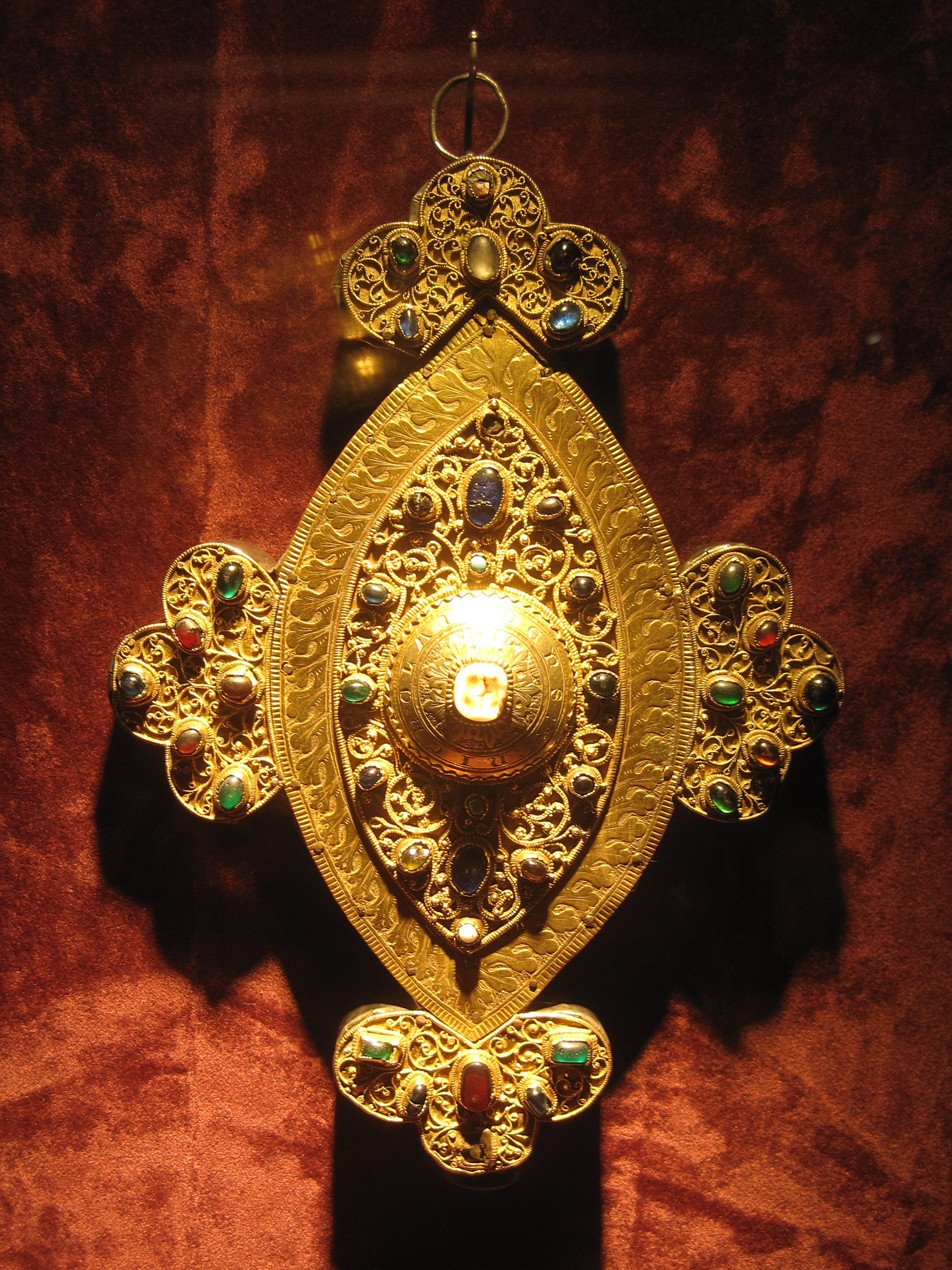
Reliquary-phylactery of the tooth of Saint-Nicolas (13th century)

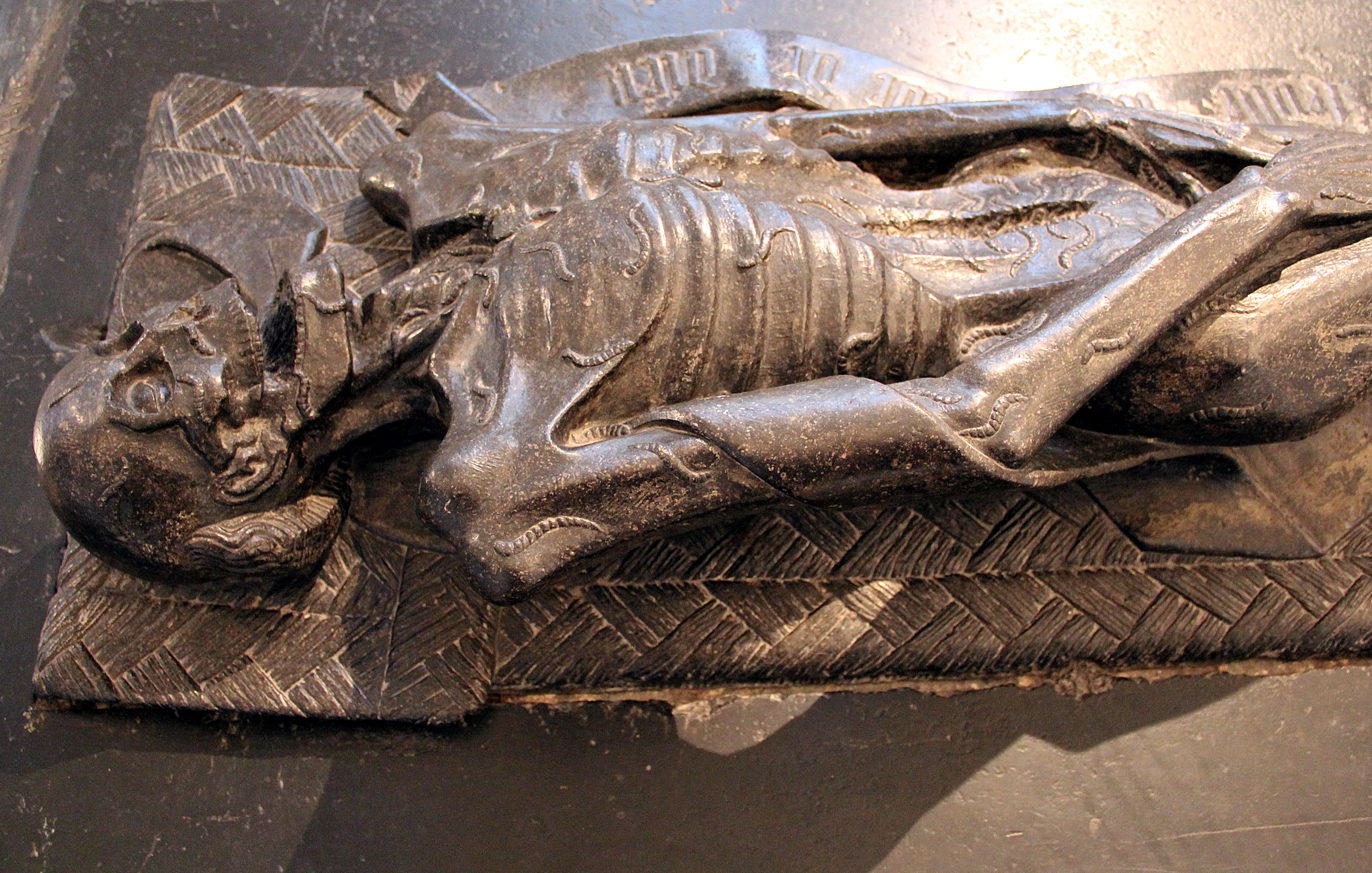
Gravestone of Guillaume Lefranchois (1446)

=== Paintings ===
The museum's collection includes paintings of the Flemish and Dutch schools including Jehan Bellegambe, Pieter Brueghel the Younger, Peter Wtewael, Balthasar van der Ast, Peter Paul Rubens, Gerard Seghers, Jacob Foppens van Es, Barent Fabritius, Nicolaes Maes and Gerbrand van den Eeckhout. From the Italian school there are works by Jacopo Bassano and paintings from the "nine muses" series of Giovanni Baglione. There are also French paintings by artists such as Claude Vignon, Philippe de Champaigne, Gaspard Dughet, Jean Jouvenet, Sébastien Bourdon, Laurent de La Hyre, Charles Le Brun, Joseph Parrocel, Nicolas de Largillière, Jean-Baptiste Oudry, Charles-André van Loo, Louis Joseph Watteau, Joseph-Marie Vien, Camille Corot, Théodore Rousseau, Théodore Chassériau, Eugène Delacroix...

Some of the works that are displayed are:

- Légende de sainte Ursule et les onze mille Vierges, oil painting on wood made in Flanders late 15th or early 16th century
- Triptyque de l'Adoration de l’Enfant Jésus, Jehan Bellegambe, oil on wod (1528)
- Triptyque Le Christ aux Bourreaux, Jehan Bellegambe, oil on wood (1530–1540)
- Terrestrial Paradise, after Jan Brueghel the Elder, oil on copper plate (17th century)
- The Descent from the Cross Peter Paul Rubens, 1612–1614)
- Saint François recevant les stigmates, Peter Paul Rubens, oil on canvas (1615)
- Présentation de la Vierge au temple, Philippe de Champaigne, oil on canvas (carton de tapisserie)
- Mort de Caton, Charles Le Brun, oil on canvas (1646)
- Achille partant au combat après la mort de Patrocle, oil on canvas, James Durno.
- Portrait d'une jeune femme, huile sur toile, Jacques-Augustin-Catherine Pajou, (1803).
- Disciples et saintes femmes relevant le corps de St Etienne pour l’ensevelir, Eugène Delacroix.
- Saulaie à Sainte Catherine, près d'Arras, Camille Corot, (vers 1855)
- La Bénédiction des blés en Artois, Jules Breton, oil on canvas (1857)
- Près d’Arras, les bûcheronnes, Camille Corot, oil on canvas (1871–1872)
- Un Mousquetaire, Jan van Beers, oil on canvas (1874)
- Hélène et Pâris, Antoine-Jean Gros, oil on canvas (early 19th century)
- La glaneuse, Jules Breton, oil on canvas (1877)
- La Grand'Place d'Arras, un jour de marché, Charles Desavary, oil on canvas (1878)
- Le peintre Désiré Dubois peignant en plein air, Constant Dutilleux, oil on canvas

=== Sculptures ===
Sculptures include:

- Fragment of a capital, representing "Avarice", made in the 12th century.
- Head of Christ, fragment of a stone sculpture made in the 13th century.
- Virgin and Child, polychrome wood sculpture made in the 14th century by an anonymous author from Flanders.
- Gravestone of Guillaume Lefranchois (1446).
- Saint-Sébastien, wooden sculpture made in the 15th century by an anonymous author from the Southern Netherlands or the Rhineland
- Education of the Virgin, polychrome wooden statue, made in the 16th century by an anonymous sculptor
- "Saint Nicolas", polychrome wooden statue made by an unknown sculptor from the 16th century
- La Famille, de Émile Joseph Nestor Carlier, (1849–1928)

=== Objets d'art ===
The most notable of the collection of art objects are:

- The reliquary-phylactery of the tooth of Saint-Nicolas (13th century)
- The angels of Humbert and the angels of Saudemont date from 1260 to 1270 with a height of 1.30 m, gold-plated matte and gloss for those Saudemont. These are fine examples of the quality of medieval sculpture in northern France. They are classified as historical monuments since 29 November 1958. The originals are in the museum, while copies are contained in one of the chapels of Saudemont and the Humbert church.
- .The reliquary-phylactery of the tooth of Saint Nicolas (13th century)
- Medieval funerary mask

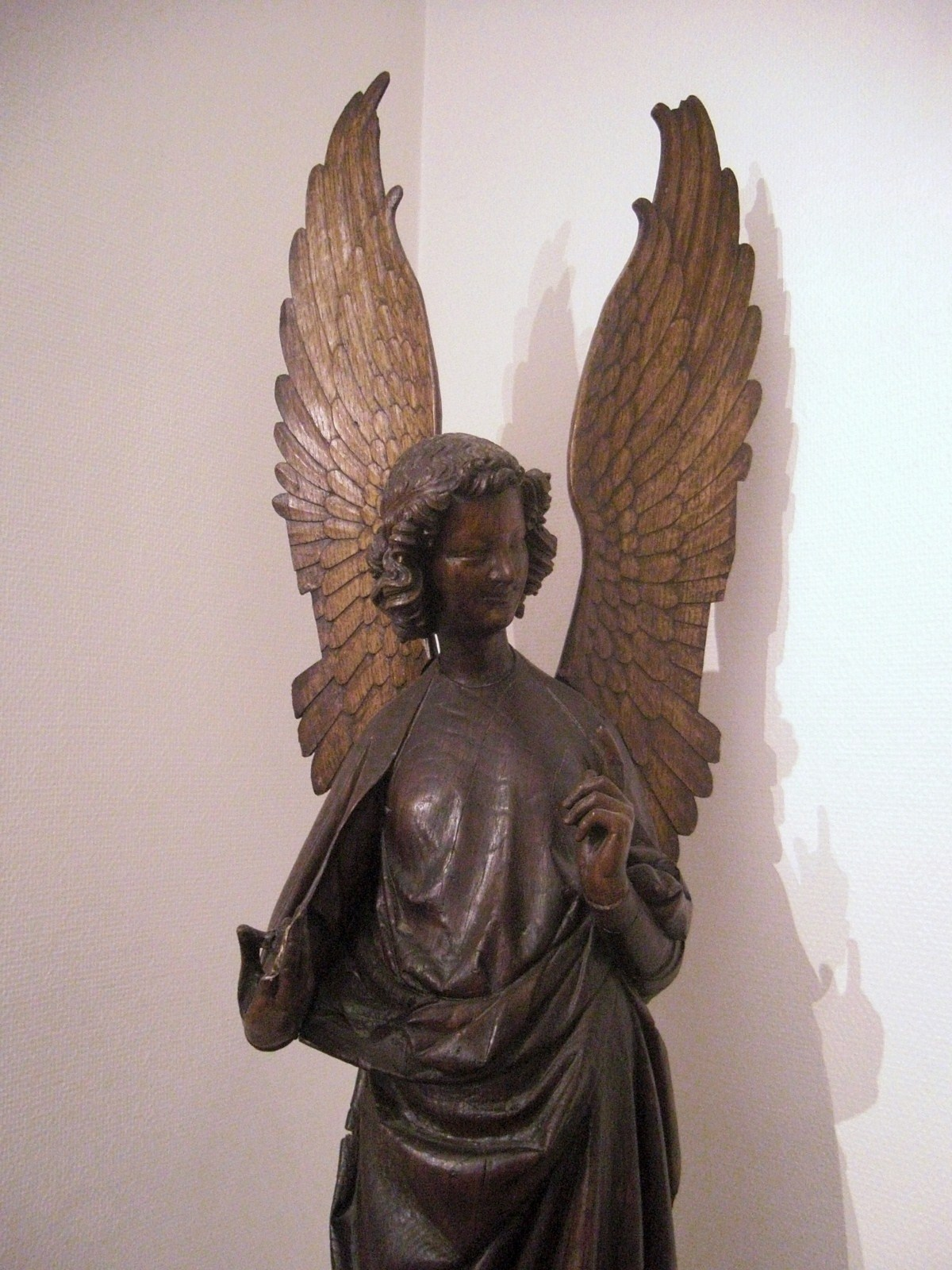
One of the anges d'Humbert

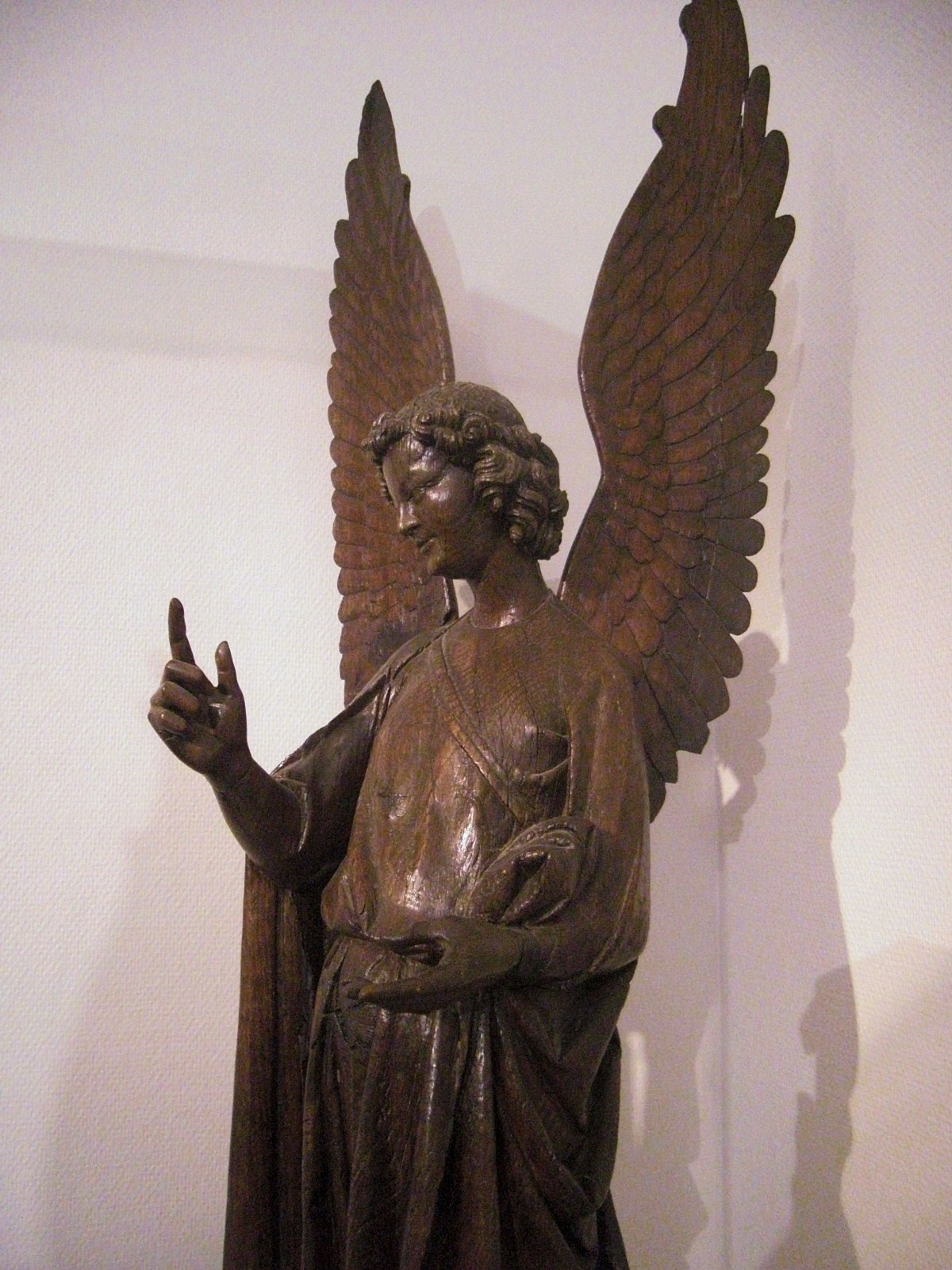
The other ange d'Humbert

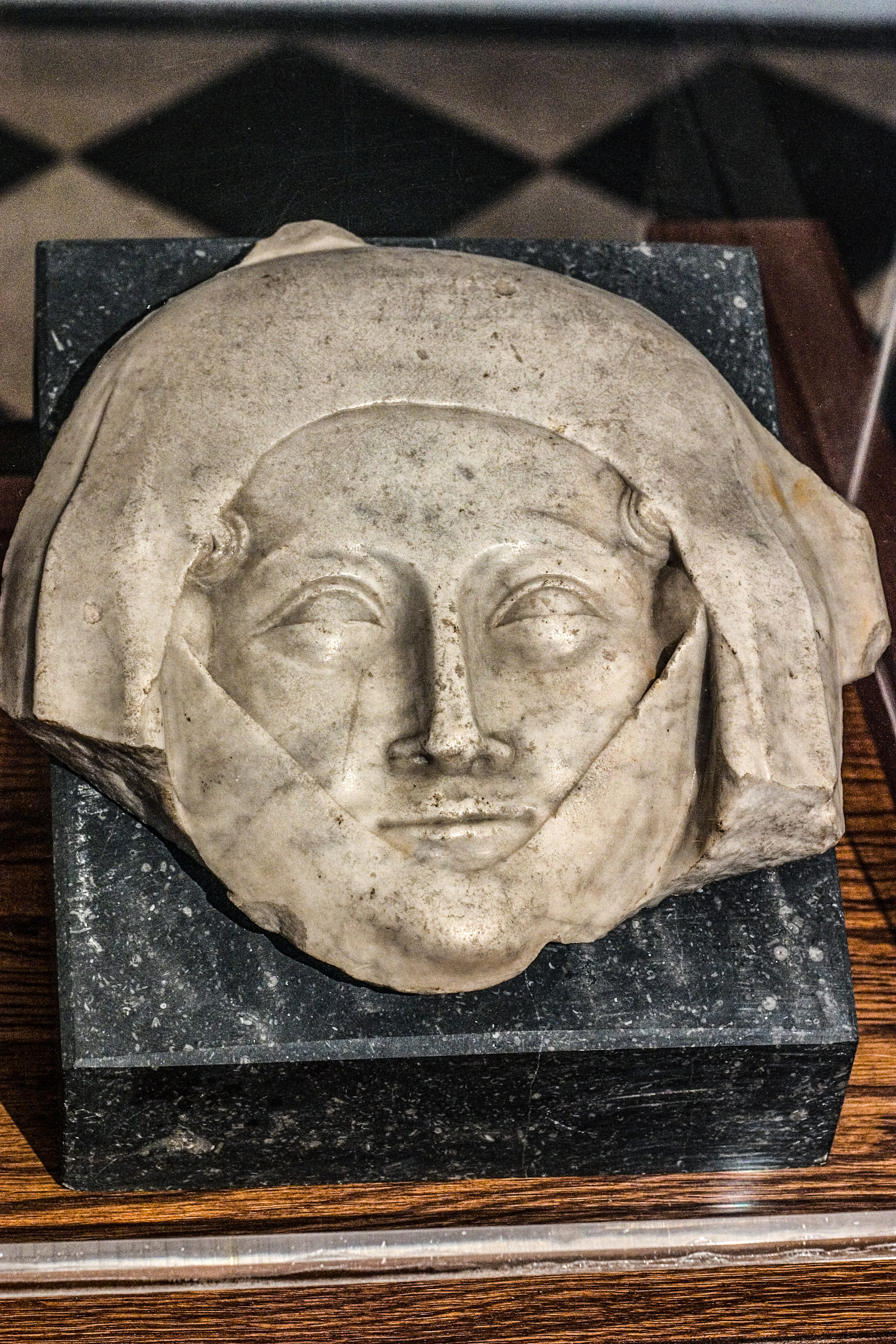
Medieval funerary mask

== Gallery ==
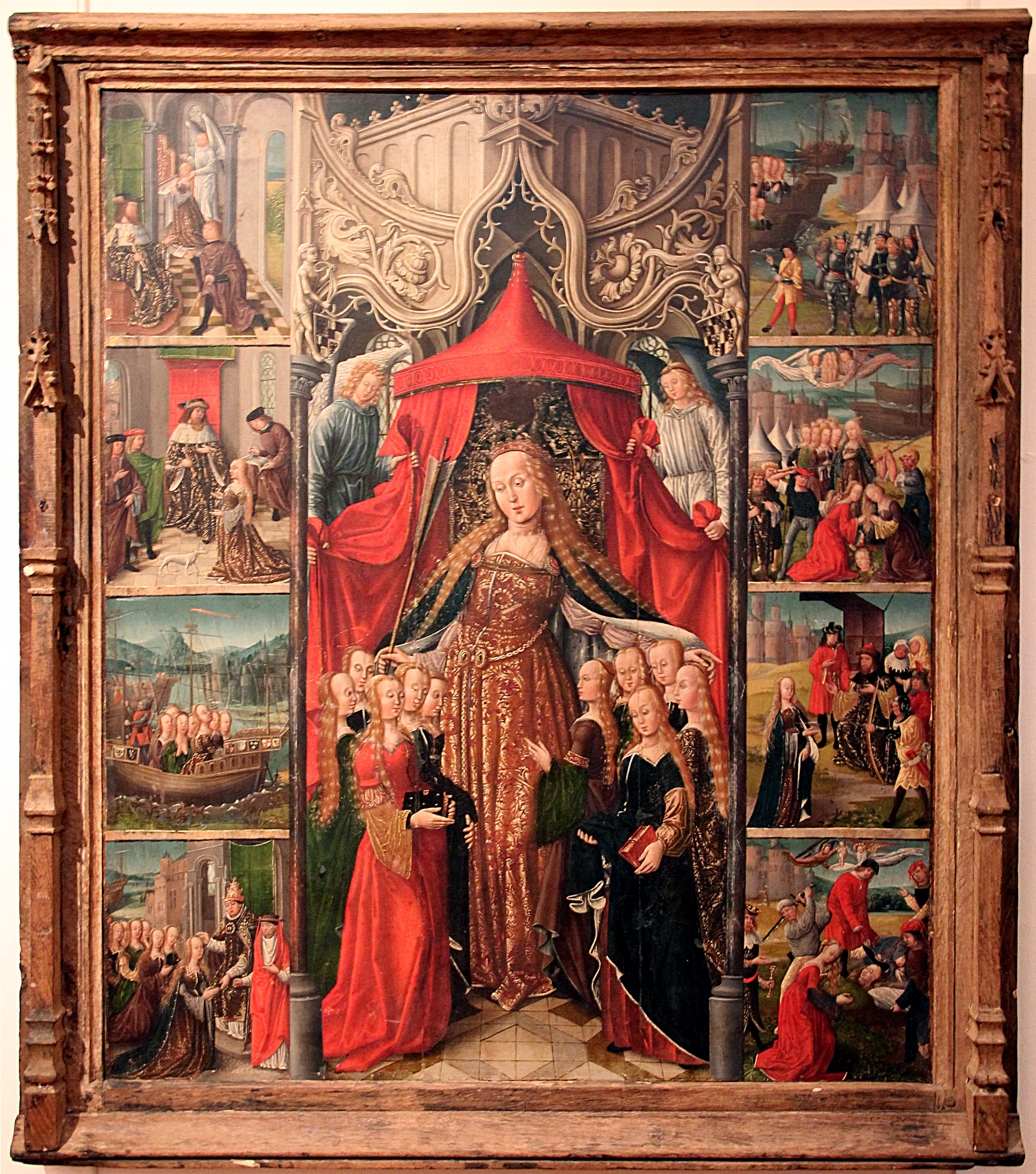
Légende de sainte Ursule et les onze mille Vierges, oil painting on wood made in Flanders late 15th or early 16th century

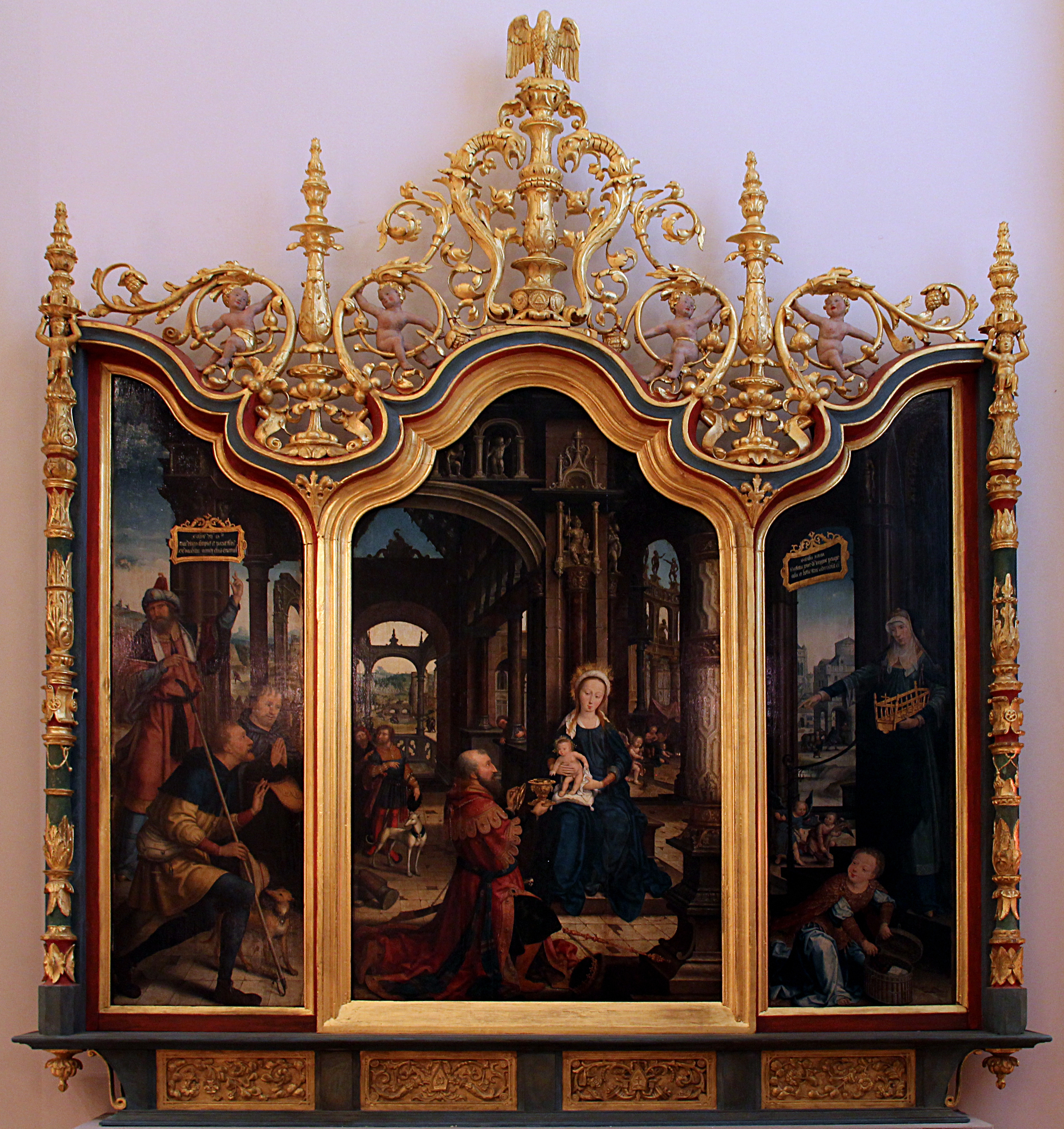
Triptyque de l'Adoration de l’Enfant Jésus, Jehan Bellegambe, oil on wood (1528)

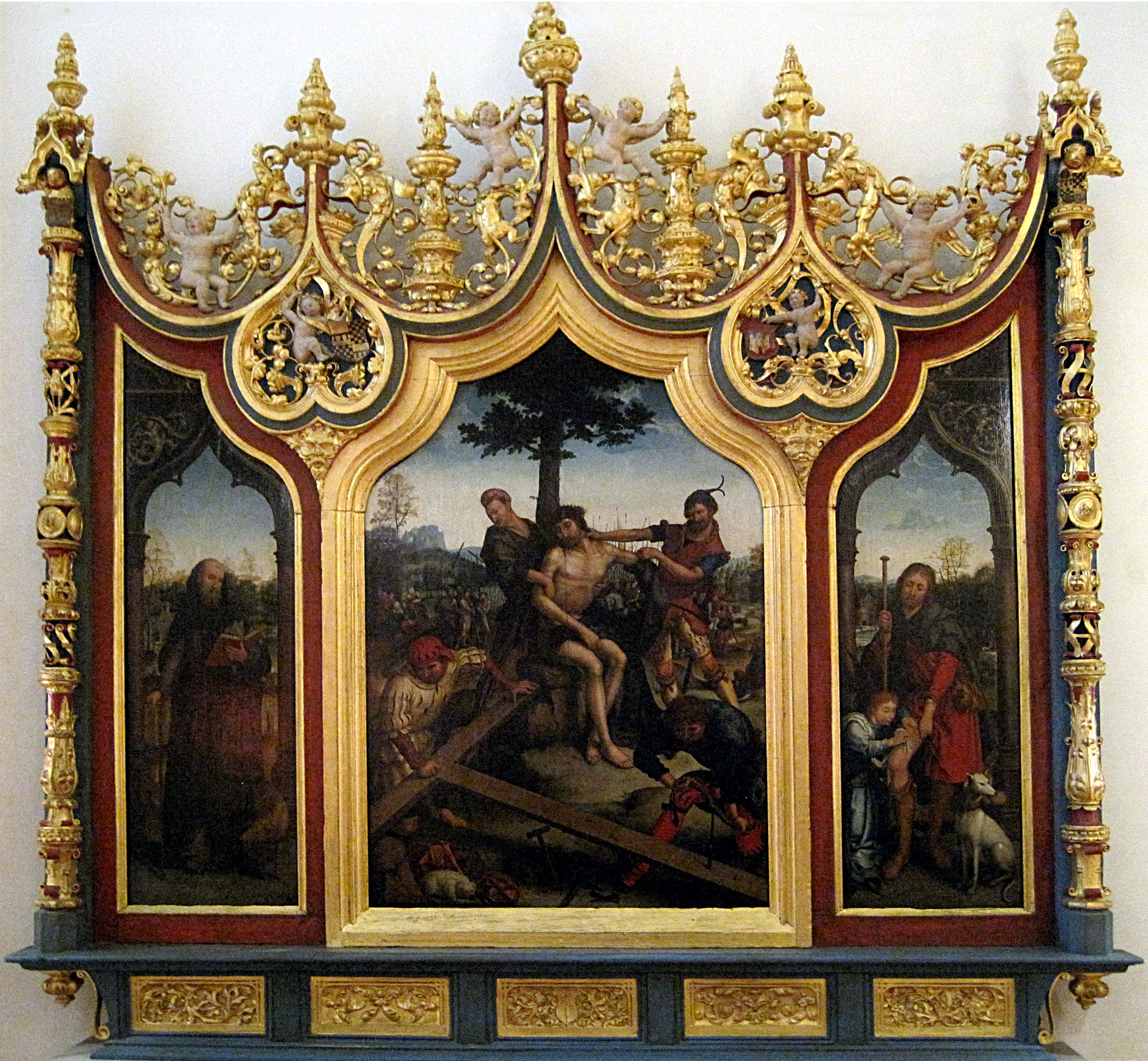
Triptyque Le Christ aux Bourreaux, Jehan Bellegambe, oil on wood (1530–1540)

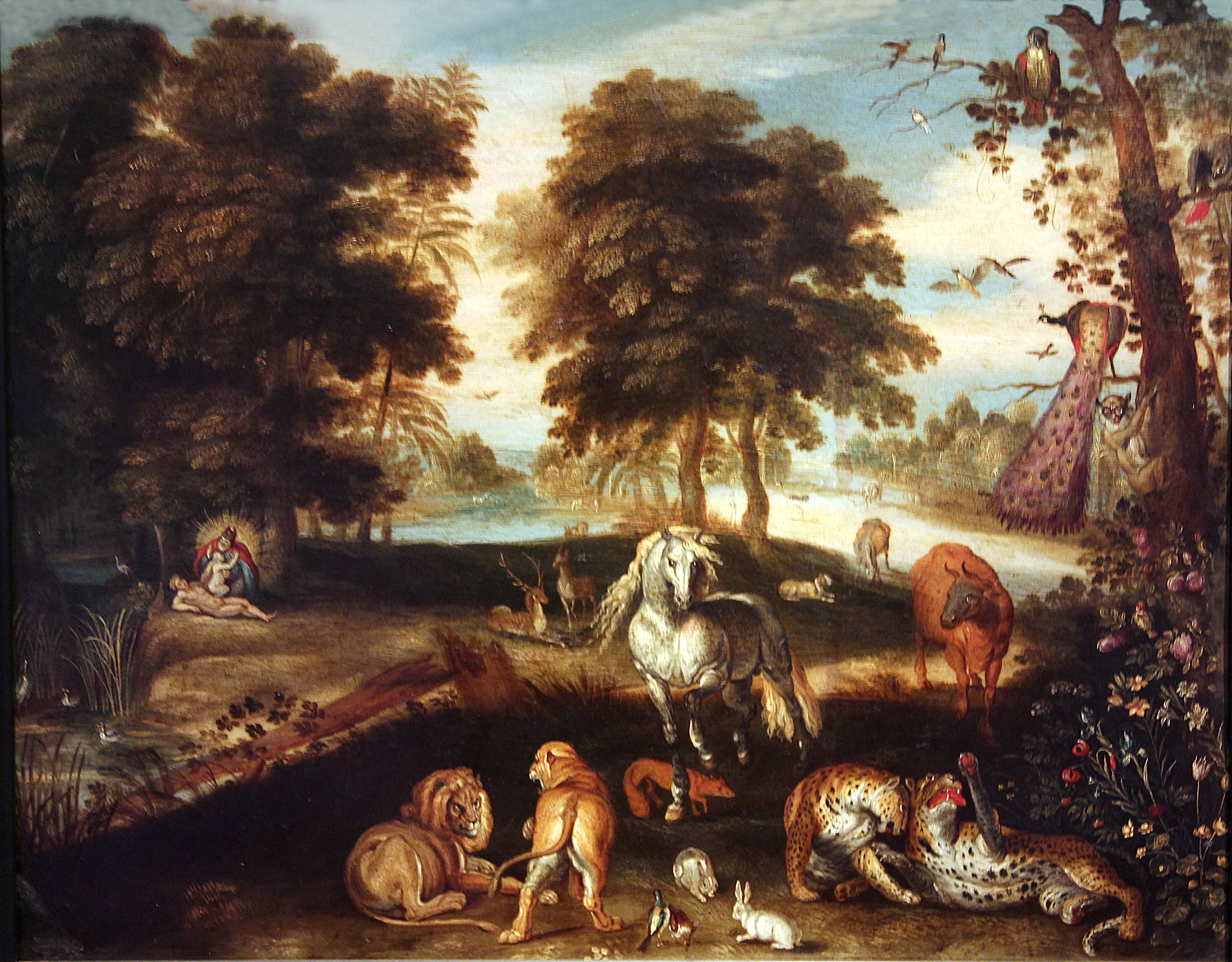
Terrestrial Paradise, after Jan Brueghel the Elder, oil on copper plate (17th century)

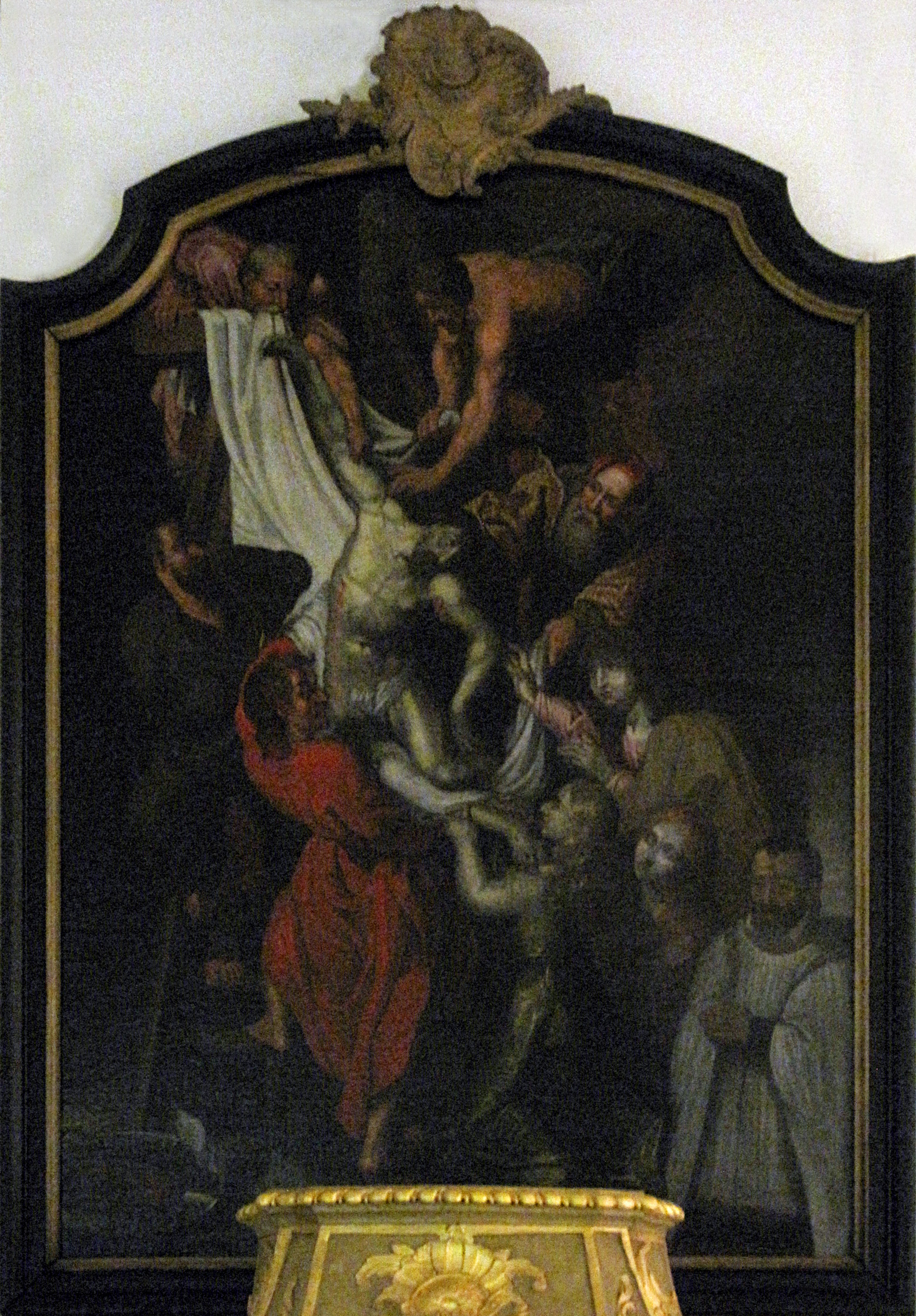
The Descent from the Cross, Peter Paul Rubens, (1612–1614)

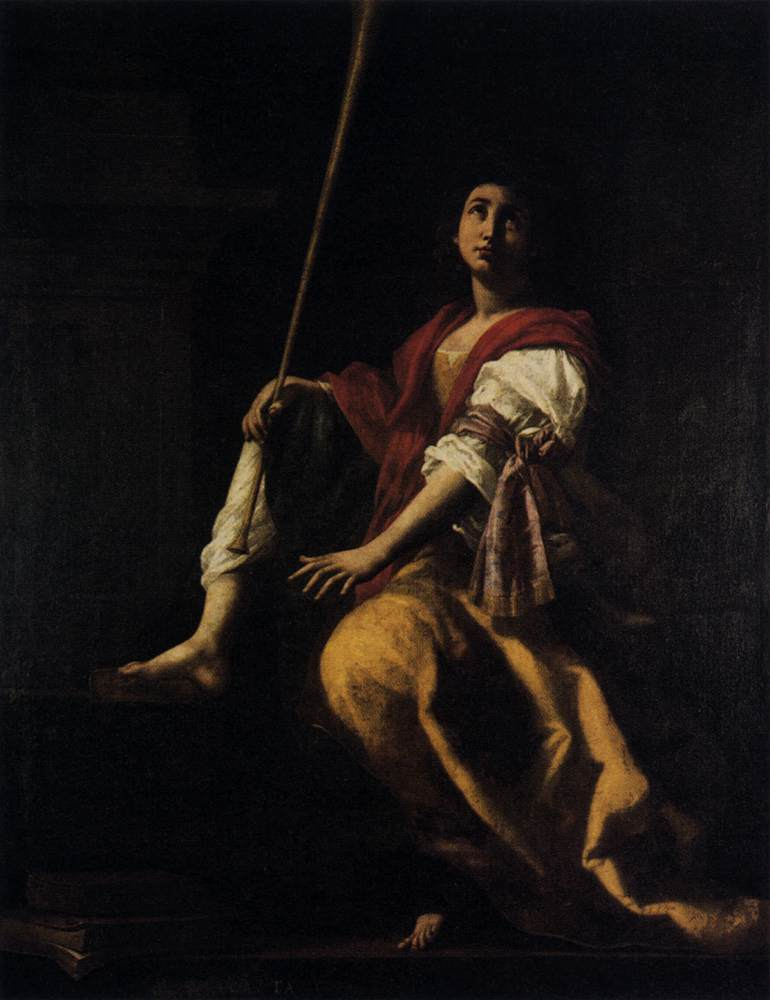
Clio, Giovanni Baglione

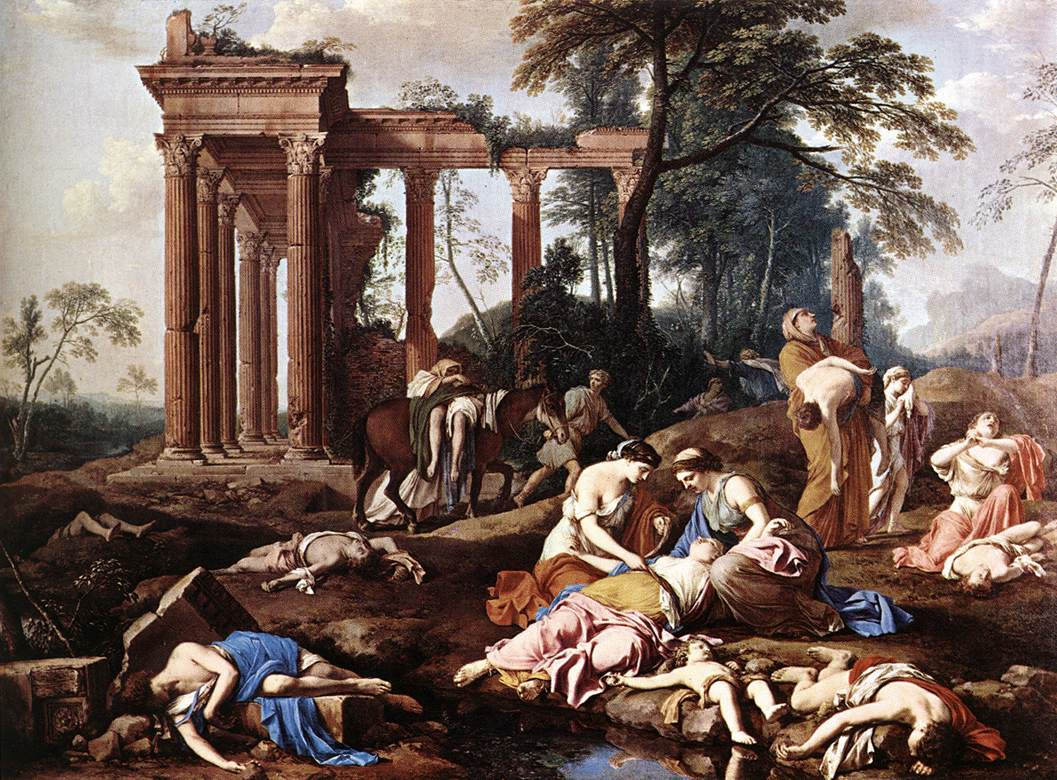
La Mort des enfants de Béthel (1653), Laurent de La Hyre

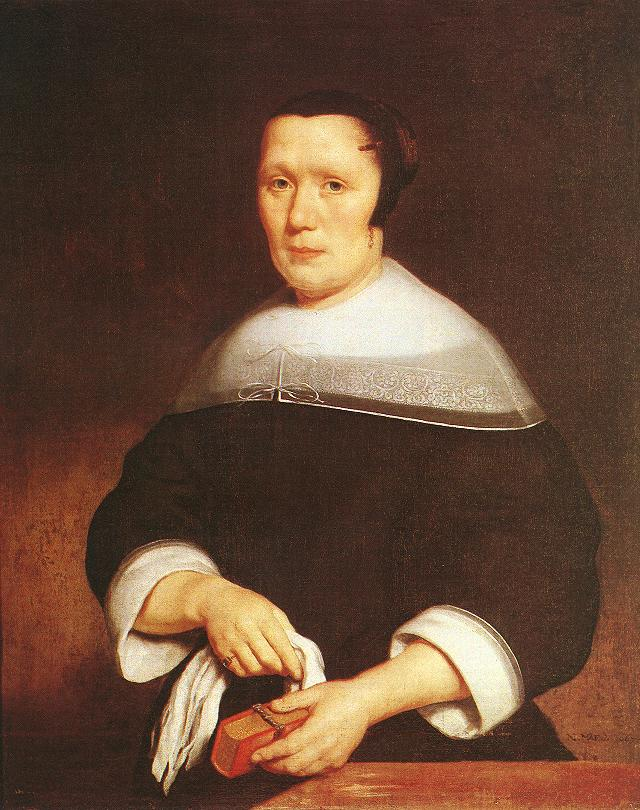
Portrait of a woman (1667), Nicolaes Maes

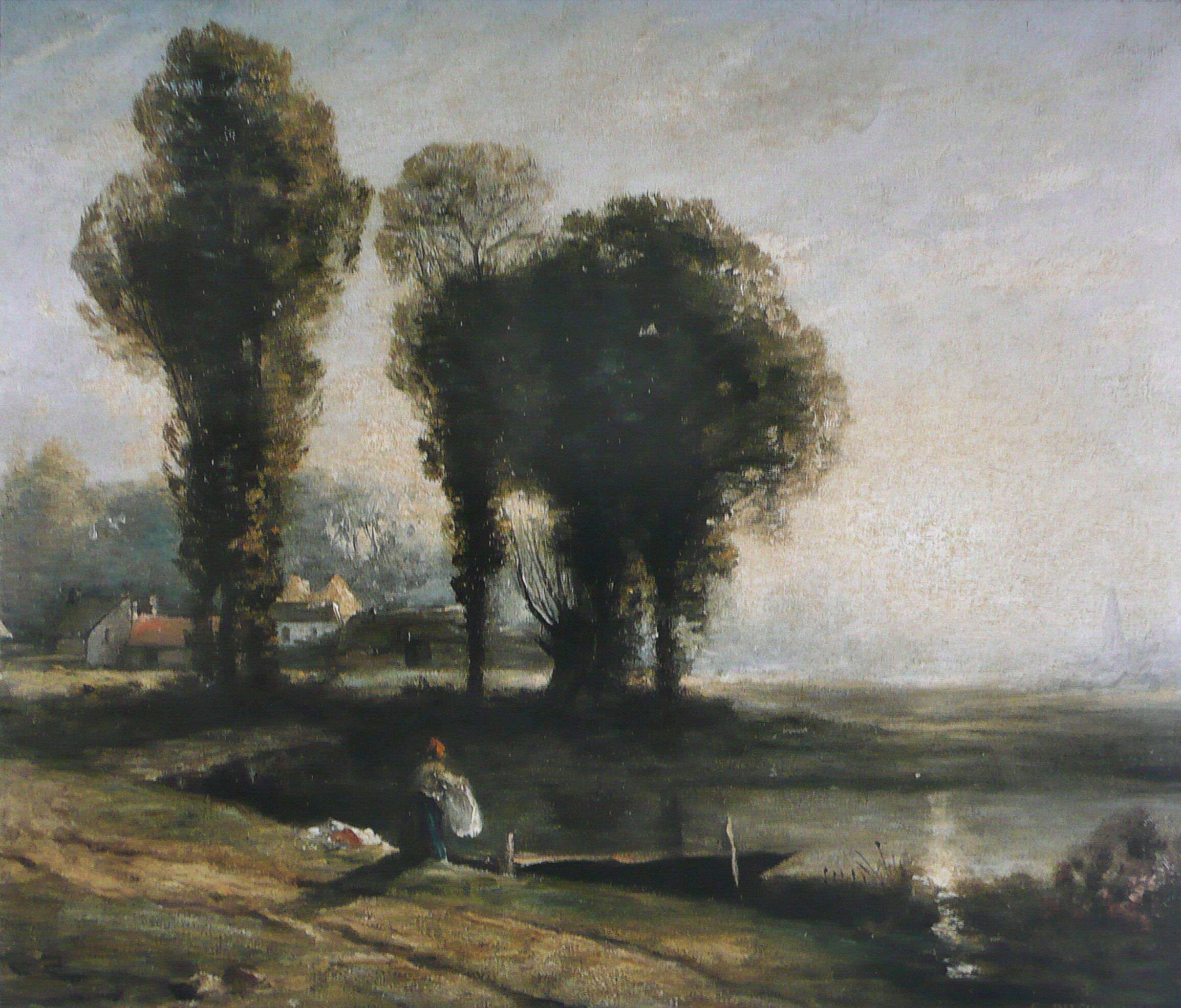
Bord de Scarpe (1860), Constant Dutilleux

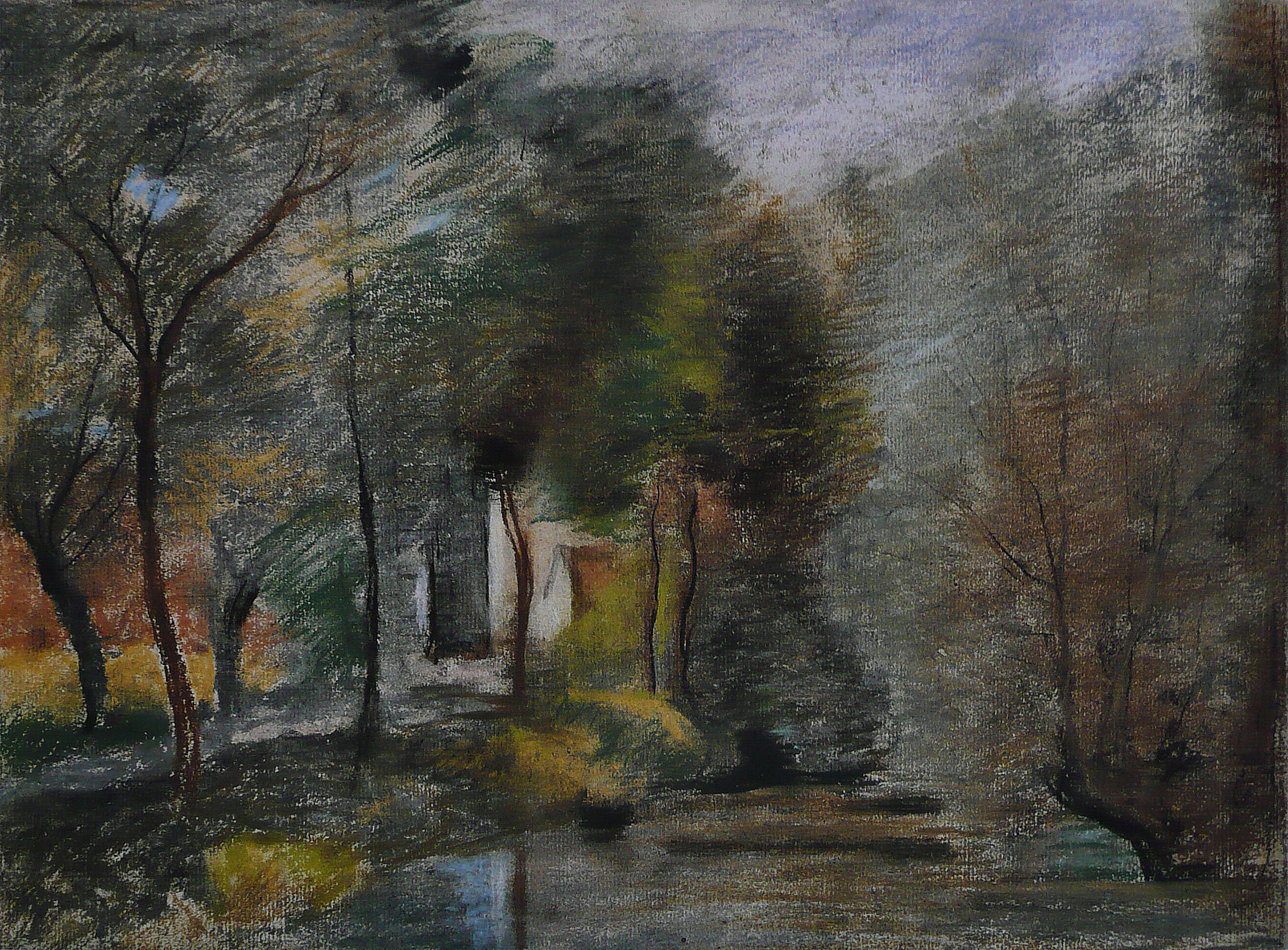
Paysage à Lambres (10 juillet 1865), Constant Dutilleux

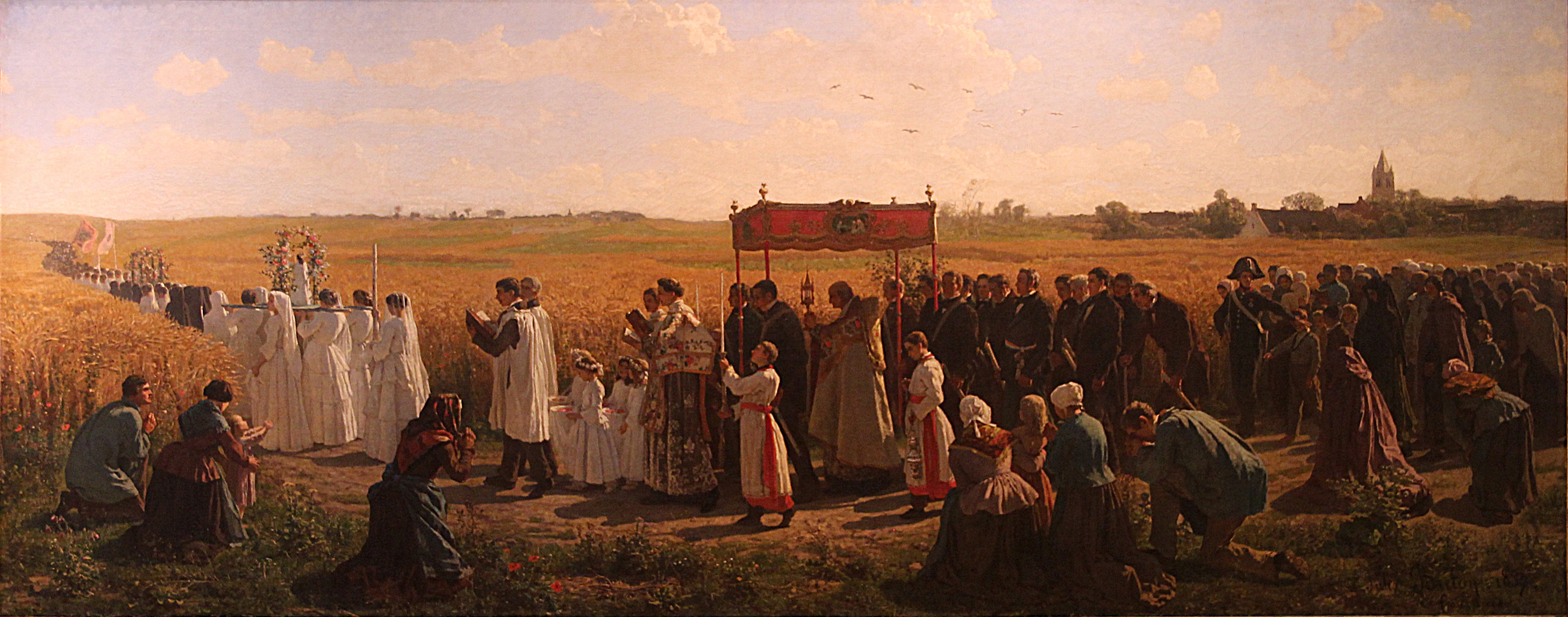
La Bénédiction des blés en Artois, Jules Breton, oil on canvas (1857)

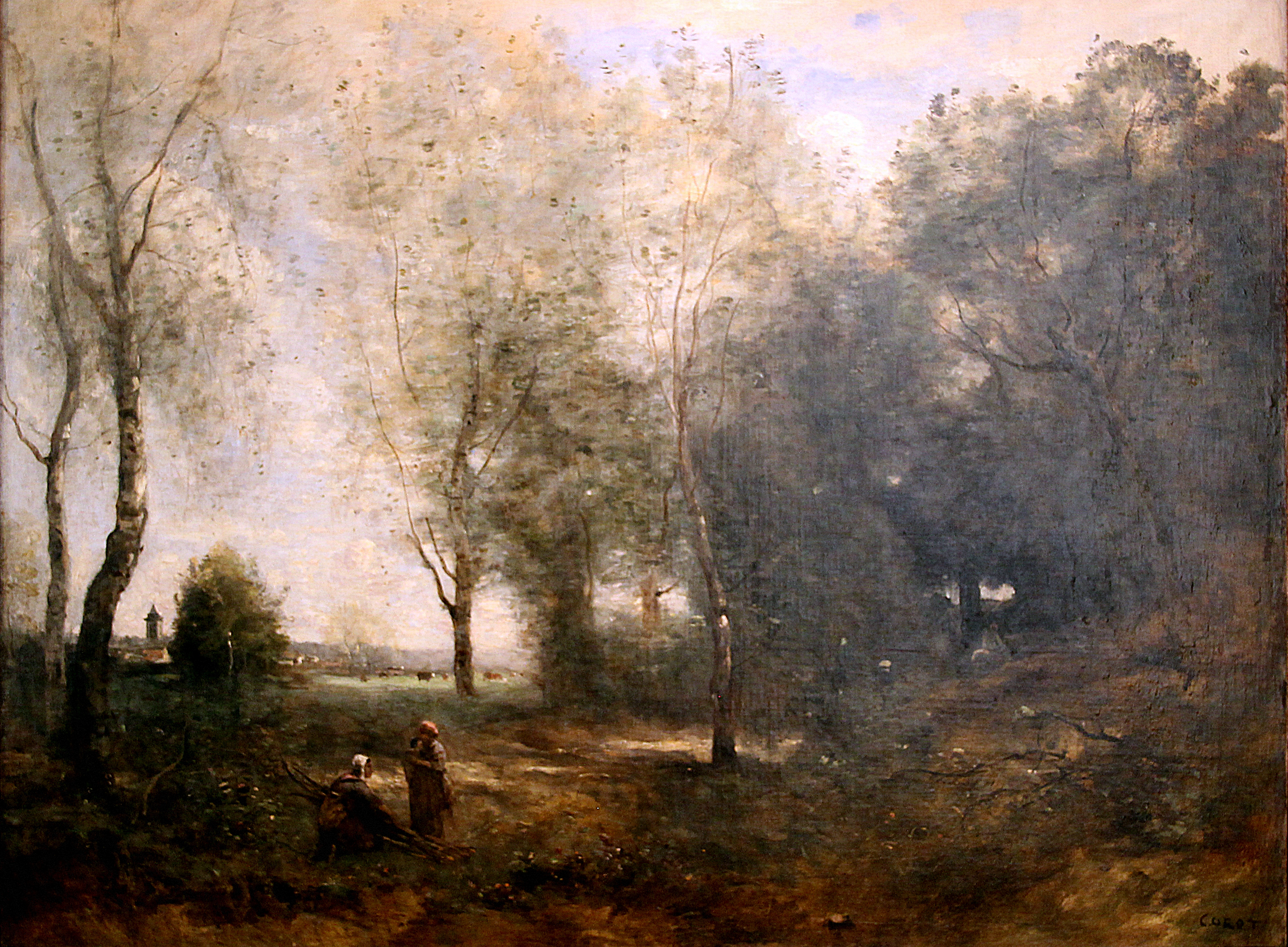
Les bûcheronnes près d'Arras, Camille Corot oil on canvas (1871–1872)

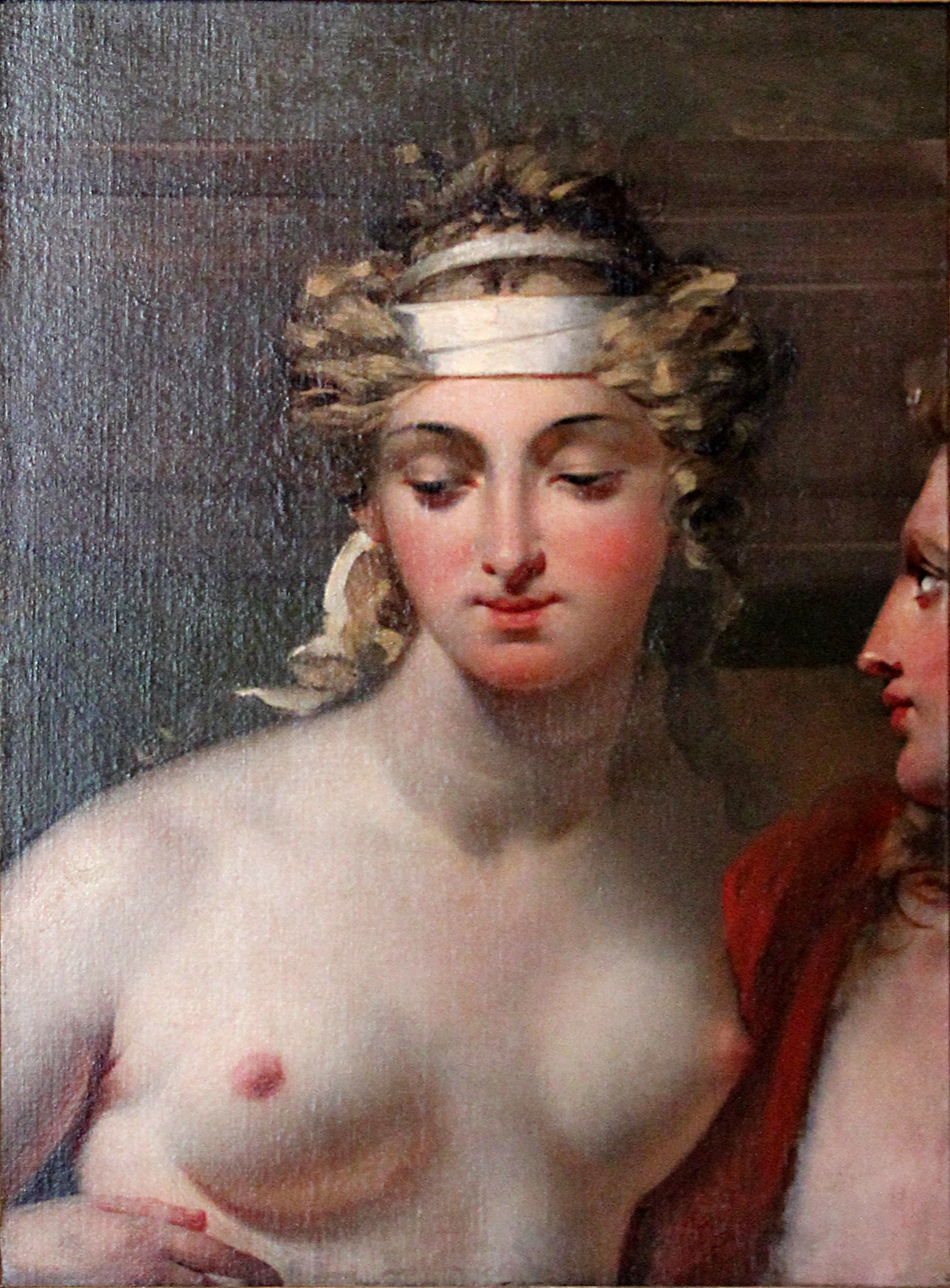
Hélène et Pâris, Antoine-Jean Gros, oil on canvas (1876)

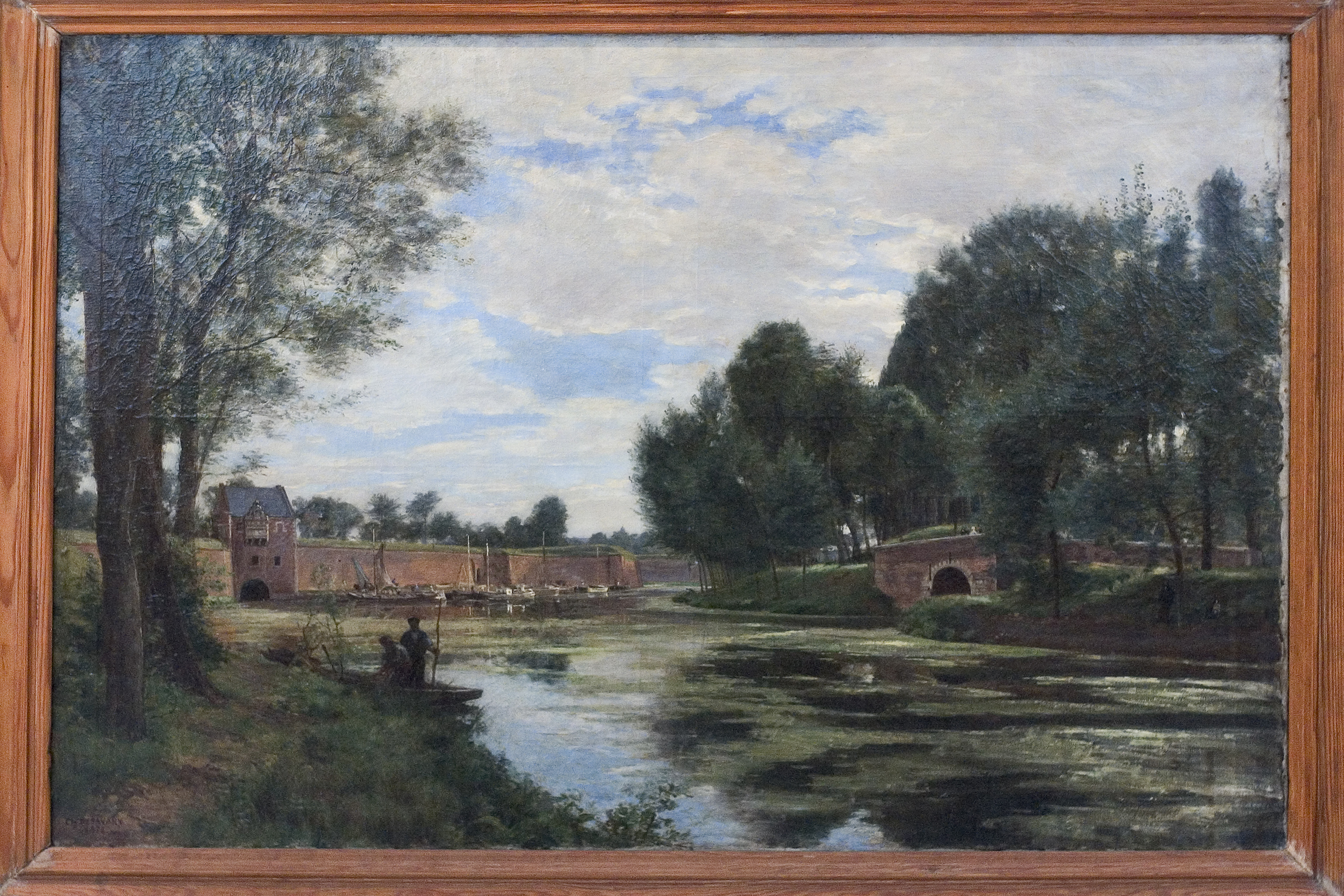
La porte d'eau et le pont de grès à Arras, Charles Desavary

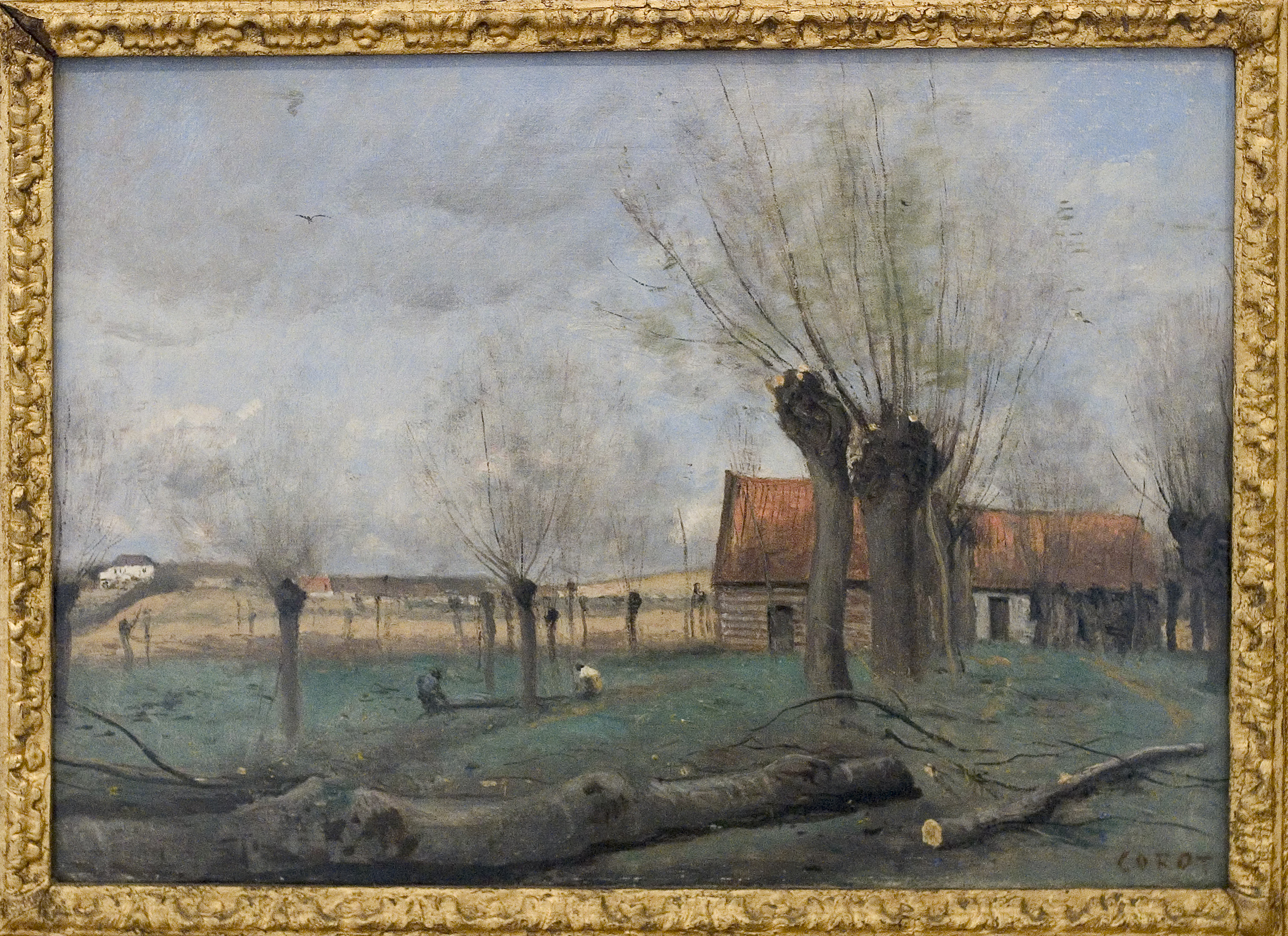
La saulaie à Sainte Catherine lès Arras, Camille Corot
