= Jemima West =

French-English actress (born 1987)

- Born: 11 August 1987 (age 39); France
- Education: Paris-Sorbonne University; (in History of Art)
- Occupation: Actress
- Years active: 1999–present
- Known for: Maison Close; The Mortal Instruments: City of Bones; Indian Summers

Jemima West (born 11 August 1987) is a French-English actress. She is bilingual and mostly grew up in Paris. She is best known for playing Isabelle Lightwood in the film adaptation of The Mortal Instruments: City of Bones and Alice Whelan in the British drama series Indian Summers. She also appeared in the second season of The Borgias as Vittoria.

== Early life ==
West's parents are English. Her father is an accountant and her mother is a business interpreter. When she was five years old, her parents moved to Paris. She attended the Sorbonne and graduated in the history of art while taking acting classes in the evening. She can speak both French and English. She has described herself as completely English and has said that she has an easier time working in her mother tongue; she says Paris is her home.

== Career ==
West made her acting début at the age of 12 when she appeared in the 1999 film Joan Of Arc, directed by Luc Besson. She later on starred in the short film I'm an Actrice directed by Maïwenn. She also starred in the third season of the Canadian television series, 15/Love.

West later went on to star in the French television shows Ben & Thomas, Trouble Paradis, R.I.S. Police Scientifique and Josephine Ange Gardien which was followed by her second film role in King Guillaume, co-starring alongside Florence Foresti.

In 2009, West starred in Paradis Criminel, a two-part thriller mini-series entitled Who Killed Little Red Riding Hood as Louisa. The mini-series was written and directed by Serge Meynard and went on to win "Best mini-series" at the 2009 La Rochelle TV Film Festival, and garnered 3 million viewers on France 2 on 22 August 2012. The mini-series thus ranks as 8th best-rated fiction of the year on the channel.

In 2010, West had a role in the French mini-series Maison Close, in which she starred as Rose, a young country girl forced to work for her freedom in a brothel. She stars alongside Anne Charrier and Valérie Karsenti.

West played Isabelle Lightwood in The Mortal Instruments: City of Bones, a film adaptation of the first book in The New York Times best-selling series The Mortal Instruments, written by Cassandra Clare. West co-starred alongside Lily Collins, Jamie Campbell Bower, and Robert Sheehan. The film was released on 21 August 2013.

== Filmography ==
=== Film ===
Year	Title	Role	Notes
1999	The Messenger: The Story of Joan of Arc	Girl	
2004	I'm an Actrice	Fille casting	Short film
2009	King Guillaume	King Guillaume	Short film
2009	Paradis Criminel: Who Killed Little Red Riding Hood	Louisa	France 2, mini-series
2011	La Morte Amoureuse	Marguerite des Ravalets	Short film
2011	JC comme Jésus Christ	Jemima	International title: Play It Like Godard
2012	Lines of Wellington	Maureen	
2012	Et ton père…!	Fleur	
2013	The Mortal Instruments: City of Bones	Isabelle Lightwood	
2014	United Passions	Annette Rimet	
2015	Kidnapping Freddy Heineken	Sonja Holleeder	
2022	Restless	Agathe	

=== Television ===
Year	Title	Role	Notes
2006	15/Love	Cassidy Payne	YTV, series regular (season 3)
2007	R.I.S. Police scientifique	Chloé Muller	TF1, episode: "Dépendances"
2008	Grand Star	Solveg	Space, 3 episodes
2008	Ben et Thomas	Liselott Karlsson	France 4, Series regular
2009	Éternelle	Carla	M6, mini-series, 1 episode
2009	Joséphine, ange gardien	Pauline	TF1, episode : "Joséphine fait de la résistance"
2009	Camping Paradis	Shirley	TF1, 1 episode
2010	Demain je me marie	Emilie	TV movie
2010–13	Maison Close	Rosalie "Rose" Tranier	Canal+, Series regular
2012	The Borgias	Vittoria	Showtime, 4 episodes
2012	As Linhas de Torres Vedras	Maureen	France 3, mini-series based on "Lines of Wellington" film
2015 - 2016	Indian Summers	Alice Whelan	Main role
2016	Endeavour	Kay Belborough	TV series, one episode, "Ride"
2018	Vera	Laura Halcombe	TV series, one episode (season 8:4 "Darkwater")
