= Međimurje under Hungarian rule =

Between 1720 and 1918

Međimurje under Hungarian rule (Croatian: Međimurje pod ugarskom vlašću)
- Part of Kingdom of Hungary
- 1720–1785, 1789–1848, 1861––1918
- Hungary Flag Zala County coat of arms

- Međimurje as part of Varaždin County on an old map from the beginning of the 18th century
- Capital: Budapest
- Government
  - Type: Lands of Hungary
- Monarch
  - 1720–1740: Charles VI of Habsburg (first)
  - 1916–1918: Charles I of Austria (last)
- Legislature: Diet of Hungary
- Historical era: Early modern period to Late modern period
  - Established: 1720–1785, 1789–1848, 1861–
  - annexation to Hungarian Zala County: 1720–1785
  - withdrewal of reforms of king Joseph II: 1789–1848
  - another annexation to Zala County in January 1861 by the decision of king Franz Joseph: 1861–1918
  - Disestablished: 1918
Preceded by	Succeeded by
Kingdom of Croatia (Habsburg)	State of Slovenes, Croats and Serbs
- Today part of: Croatia

Međimurje under Hungarian rule is the historical period of Međimurje (Hungarian: Muraköz), the northernmost part of Croatia, from the Early modern period to Late modern period, during which it was an integral part of Zala County in Hungary. It was a centuries-old aspiration of the Hungarian rulers that came true in 1720, as Međimurje was acquired by Michael Johann III. Althann (1679–1727), a Habsburg Count and member of the House of Althann, an ancient German noble family. Until then, although in the possession of Croatian, Hungarian and Austrian noblemen (Demetrius Csák, Güssinger family, Lacković family, Ernušt family, Zrinskis and others), Međimurje was mostly part of the Varaždin County, which formally belonged to the medieval Kingdom of Slavonia or early modern Kingdom of Slavonia, one of Croatian lands. From 1527 the entire territory fell under Habsburg Monarchy and after the formation of Croatian Military Frontier on parts of the Croatian territory, Međimurje remained outside it and was, as before, under the administration of the Ban (Banus) of Croatia (in the so-called Banal Croatia).

In the ecclesiastical view, even after 1720, this area in the north of the present-day Republic of Croatia, populated almost exclusively by Croats (with very small shares of other ethnic groups), belonged all the time to the Diocese of Zagreb (later Archdiocese). From 1720 until 1918, except for two shorter periods, Međimurje administratively belonged to Zala County, which was located in the southwest of the Kingdom of Hungary and whose seat was in the town of Zalaegerszeg. It was exempted from Hungarian administration only twice, in the years 1785 – 1789 and 1849 – 1861, when it was returned to Kingdom of Croatia governed by Ban of Croatia, for a shorter time. During the Hungarian rule, especially after 1861, the inhabitants of Međimurje were under constant pressure on loss of national identity, the imposition of a foreign, incomprehensible language, and exposure to various types of physical and psychological violence, especially if they would openly oppose the imposed government. Intensive Hungarianization was carried out, especially for children through education in newly established state schools, which increasingly replaced the previous religious schools, where teaching was in Croatian language. In Čakovec, a Teachers' School (or Preparandie), a kind of preparatory school, was founded for the education of those school teachers who carried out Hungarianization. This School manifested itself through journalism and publishing, as well as in other ways. The peak of Hungarianization and violence against the local language occurred in 1898, when the authorities introduced renaming of all Croatian topographic names in Međimurje, so the genuine, old Croatian names of the settlements were caricaturally, more or less successfully renamed into Hungarian language.

Međimurje was "de facto" returned to Croatia on Christmas Eve, 24 December 1918, by a decisive action of military units of the National Council of the State of Slovenes, Croats and Serbs, composed of volunteers and former members of the Austro-Hungarian Army or Royal Croatian Home Guard. That military operation expelled Hungarian rulers across the Mura River into the territory of newly arising state – Kingdom of Hungary, which was significantly reduced to much smaller borders than before the First World War. On 9 January 1919 a great public assembly was convened in Čakovec, where a Resolution on the secession of Međimurje from the Hungarian state was passed. Međimurje was once again returned to Croatia by the will of the people, which was later confirmed at the international Paris Peace Conference through the Treaty of Trianon.

== Background ==
With the coronation of Coloman as Croatian king in Biograd in 1102, the entire territory of the medieval Croatian kingdom, including Međimurje, entered into a personal union with Hungary. Međimurje was and remained mostly part of Slavonia, the northern part of the Kingdom of Croatia, and the kings or hercegs (dukes), like Coloman, Duke of Slavonia (ruled 1226–1241) gave properties in that area to Croatian, Hungarian and German nobles as well (e.g. Güssinger). There are sources that say that in the 13th century Međimurje for some time belonged to the Hungarian County of Zala, and at the beginning of the 14th century to Ulrich I. von Walsee, a German nobleman.

In the second half of the 16th century Croatian nobleman Juraj IV Zrinski (*1549–†1603), a supporter of Protestantism, was for some time the administrator of Zala County (not ispán), a Hungarian territorial unit that bordered on the Mura river with Međimurje, and then Međimurje began to gravitate towards Hungary, where Protestantism was very widespread at that time. However, in 1609, the Croatian Parliament concluded that only the Catholic religion is recognized in Croatia, so Juraj's son Juraj V Zrinski returned to Catholicism, and Protestant preachers and supporters became unwelcome in Međimurje.

=== Documents ===
The first preserved documents mentioning Međimurje date back to the 13th century. In the charter of King Emeric from 1203, the inhabitants of Mihovljan, which lies "between the Mura and the Drava", are released from all debts to the king and the Ban and are exempt from paying taxes. The mention of the word "Ban" here indicates that Međimurje was under the administration of Croatian Ban (Banus). Since there were no Bans in the government structure of Hungary proper (but only on southern borderlands), this means that the area between Mura and Drava was not an integral part of Hungary, but of Croatia (and Slavonia respectively).

In his book "Natale solum magni ecclesiae doctoris sancti Hieronymi in ruderibus Stridonis occultatum, probatorum nihilominus historicorum, et geographicorum opinionibus, ac brevis Illyricanae chronologiae adjumento erutum, atque cum vita ejusdem purpurati Dalmatae per a.r.p. Josephum Bedekovich, ordinis fratrum eremitarum s. Pauli primi eremitae definitorim generalem patefactum, anno reparatae salutis, M.DCC.LII., Neostadii Austriae, ex typographeo Mulleriano" ("Birthplace of the great church teacher Saint Jerome hidden under the ruins of Stridon, which was disclosed according to the opinion of excellent historians and geographers, with a short Illyrian chronology, and published with the biography of the same crimson Dalmatian by Reverend Father Josip Bedeković, general councilor of the order of the brothers of the first hermit St. Paul, the year of salvation gained again in 1752 in the Austrian Wiener Neustadt from Müller's printing house") issued in Wiener Neustadt in 1752, Pauline monk Josip Bedeković Komorski (*1688–†1760) cites evidence of county jurisdiction in Međimurje. Among the older evidence is one grant of King Matthias Corvinus from 1470 issued in Budapest in which it is written: "Nos Mathias Dei gratia Rex Hungariae etc. Memoriae commendamus tenore praesentium significantes, quibus expedit etc. Quod nos consideratis fidelitate etc. totalem possessionem Gardinovec vocatam, in Comitatu Varasdiniensi et Districtu Drava-Muraköz etc." In translation: "We, Matthias, by the grace of God the King of Hungary etc. hereby inform all those concerned etc. that, considering the fidelity etc. granted the entire property called Gardinovec in Varaždin County, in the Drava-Međimurje District, etc."

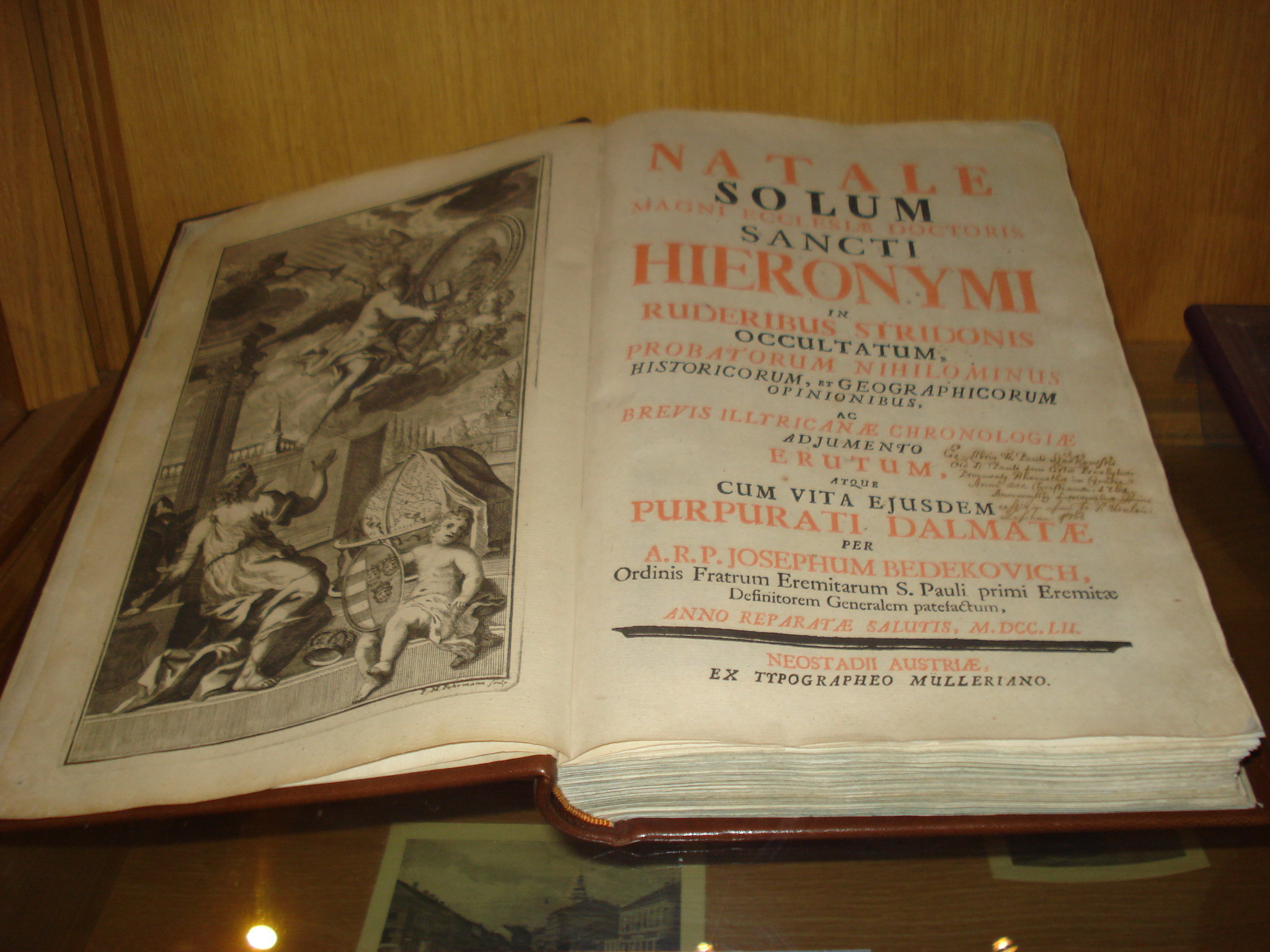
A specimen of Bedeković's book "Natale solum magni ecclesiae doctoris sancti Hieronymi..." from 1752, in which he wrote about Međimurje belonging to the Varaždin County and to the Kingdom of Slavonia respectively.

Bedeković also mentions „royal documents" relating to the monastery of Saint Helen from 1455 (issued by King Ladislav V Posthumous), 1458 and 1465 (by King Matthias Corvinus), and from 1554 (by King Ferdinand I. Habsburg), in which it is expressly stated that "the monastery lies in the Kingdom of Slavonia". Likewise, in the Hungarian Tripartitum, in Paragraph 34 of Decree 3, which was all confirmed by King Vladislaus II Jagiellon at the Buda Parliament in 1498, it is written that the Thirtieth is collected in the places of the Kingdom of Slavonia where there are tax offices or their branches, among which Zagreb, Varaždin, Nedelišće, Raskrižje, Vinica, Krapina and Stubica are mentioned (Nedelišće and Raskrižje refer to places in Međimurje).

There is a certificate issued by King Rudolf II Habsburg in Prague on 8 May 1603 in which Međimurje is mentioned referring to Franjo, Stjepan and Ladislav Repić for the ownership of the estates Gardinovec and Tomašovec (Sveti Martin na Muri). The following words are written in the certificate: ...Omnino in Districtu Drava-Muraköz in Comitatu Varasdinensi, et Regno nostro Slavoniae existens, habitum etc. (in translation: "...it is located in the district of Drava-Međimurje in Varaždin County and in our Kingdom of Slavonia, etc.").

A certificate issued by King Ferdinand II. Habsburg on 11 December 1635 to Matija and Doroteja Filok for the Gardinovec estate, has the following content: Nos Ferdinandus II. Dei gratia Romanorum Imperator et Rex Hungariae etc. Memoriae commendamus etc. Quod fidelis noster Mathias Filok etc. Exposuerunt etc. Qualiter illi certarum litterarum Rudolphi Imperatoris etc. Omnino in districtu Drava-Muraköz et Comitatu Varasdinensi existens, habit etc. (translated: "We, Ferdinand II., by the grace of God the Roman Emperor and King of Hungary etc. inform etc. that our faithful son Matthias Filok etc. have exposed etc. that he, on the basis of a certain gift of Emperor Rudolf's awarded property, which is undoubtedly located in the Drava-Međimurje district, in the Varaždin County, resides etc."). This charter of the ruler of the country indisputably proves that Gardinovec, the property of the Filoks, lies in Međimurje, which is a part of the Varaždin County.

Some historians from the 17th and 18th century said that Međimurje belonged to Varaždin County, that means to Croatia. Janez Vajkard Valvasor, a baron from Carniola (modern-day Slovenia), wrote that ancient Stridon, the birthplace of St. Hyeronimus (who himself wrote that he was born on the border area of Dalmatia and Pannonia), is located in Štrigova in northwestern Međimurje, the Italian writer Daniele Farlati pointed out that the Varaždin County extended across the Drava River, and Croatian historians Vitković and Krčelić stated similarly.

=== Old maps ===
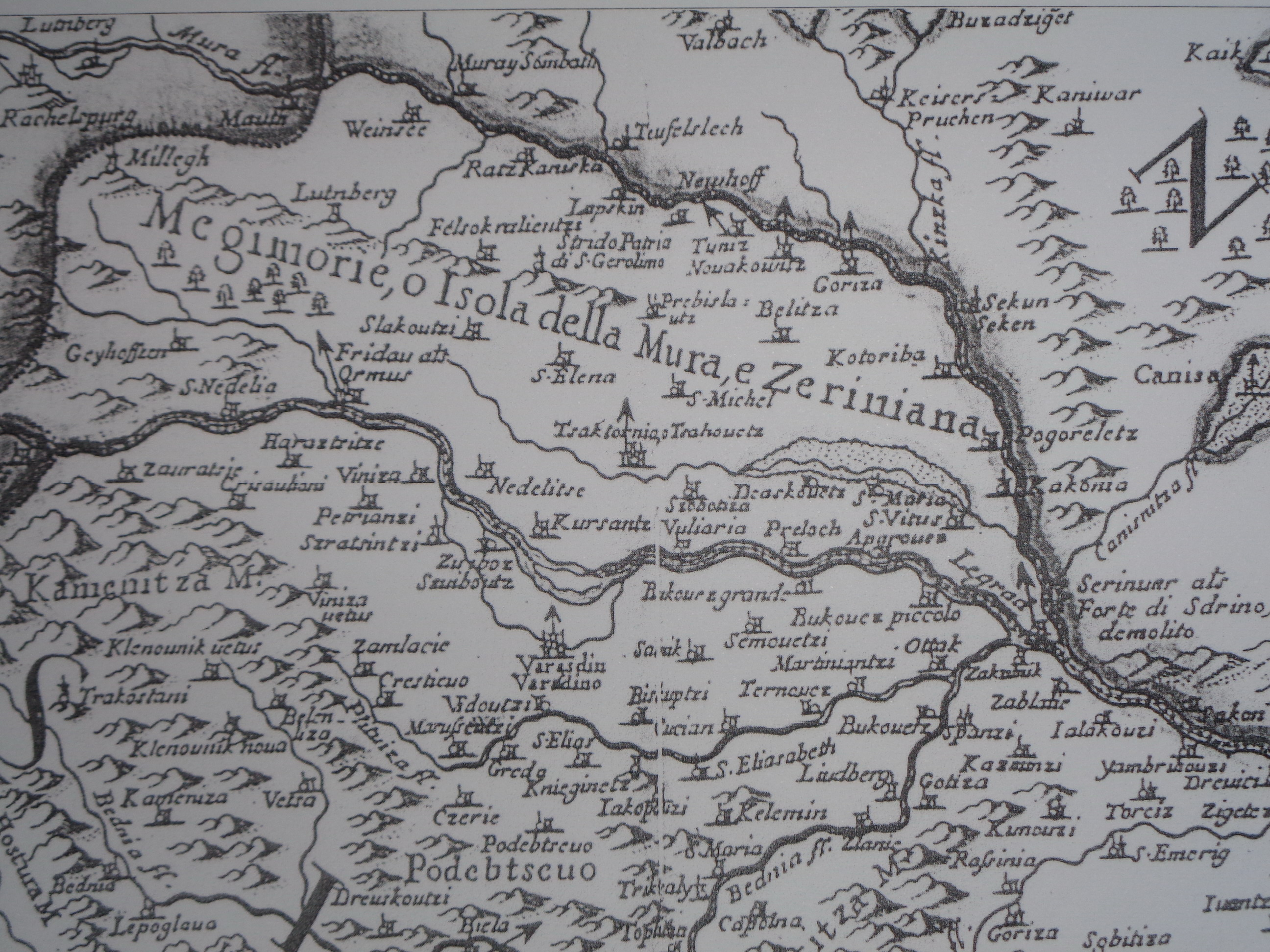
On the old map of Međimurje from 1690 made by Giacomo Cantelli from Rome, it can be seen that the border with Hungary runs along the Mura river and that Međimurje is part of Croatia

In addition to written documents, there are also old maps or atlases, especially those from the 17th century, on which Međimurje is drawn as part of Croatia. On the map of the Italian cartographer Giacomo Cantelli from 1690, for instance, the area between the Mura and the Drava is marked as "Megimorie, o Isola della Mura, e Zeriniana", and the border between Croatia and Hungary is drawn on the Mura river.

As a part of Croatia (more precisely, Slavonia), Međimurje is also found on the large map of Croatia, Dalmatia and Slavonia (as well as surrounding countries) by the German publisher August Vindelicor from 1720 (the year in which it was annexed to Hungary). The same is the case with the map called "Dalmatia and neighboring Croatia, Bosnia, Slavonia, etc." issued by the German printer Peter Conrad Monath

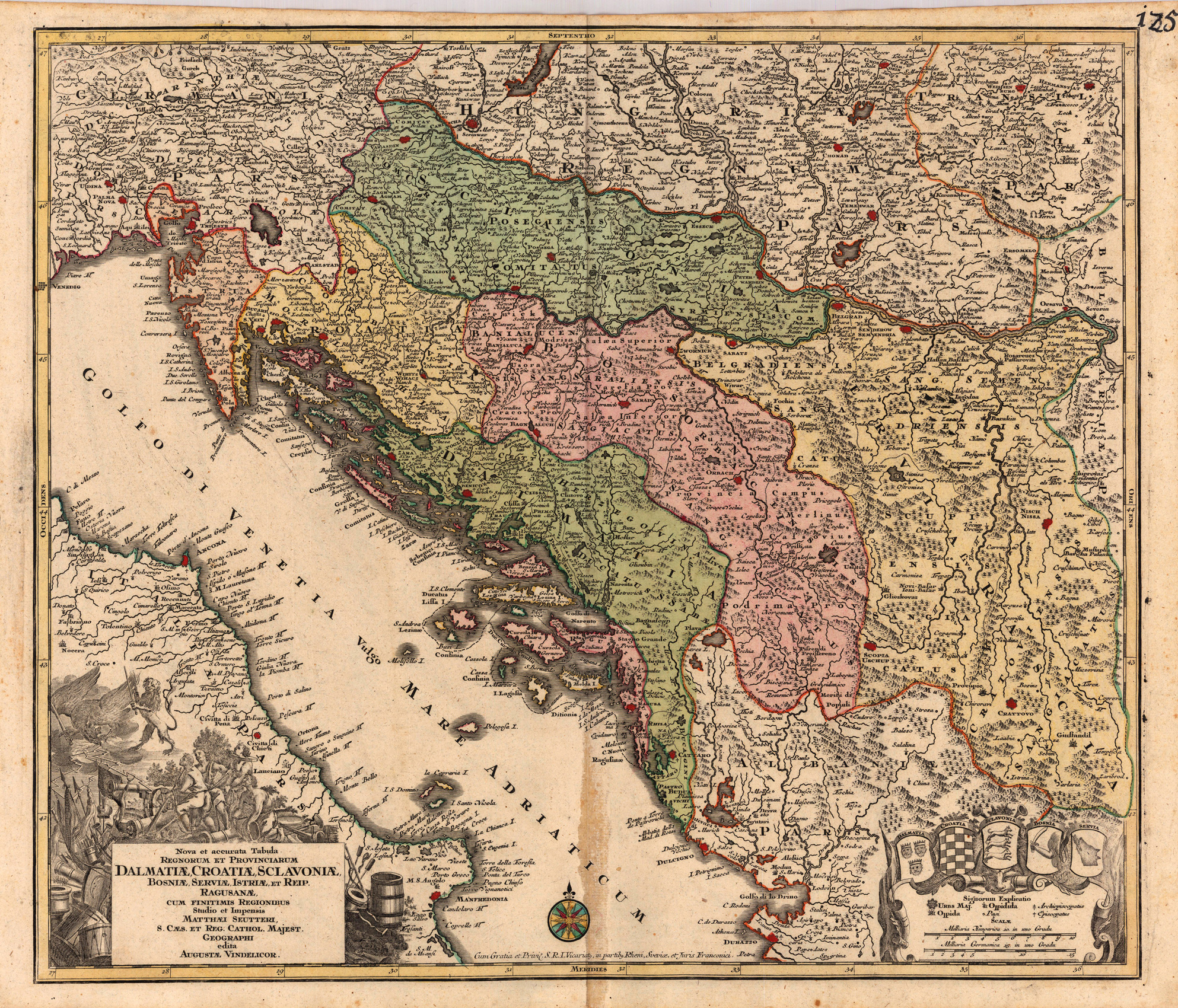
On the map of Croatian lands and surrounding countries from 1720 by the German publisher August Vindelicor, Međimurje is shown as part of Slavonia (green colour)

=== The Royal Court Chamber from Graz took over Međimurje in 1691 ===
As Adam Zrinski died in the battle of Slankamen in 1691 having left no successor, the Royal Court Chamber from Graz took over the whole Međimurje. This lasted for several years and then King Leopold I. of Habsburg, since at that time the Great Turkish War was going on and he needed money, decided in 1695 to sell Međimurje. The buyer became Savoyan marquis de Prié, but he was unable to pay off his purchase to the end, so in 1702 he returned it to the king, that is, to the Chamber. The latter administered Međimurje on behalf of the king until 1715.

At the Pressburg Assembly, held in 1715, King Charles III. (VI.) of Habsburg confirmed the affiliation of Međimurje to Croatia and the application of its laws. As it was written by Rudolf Horvat, PhD, in his book "The History of Međimurje", this king's confirmation is found in legal article number 44 of the Pressburg Assembly. In the same year, the king leased the entire seignory to count Ivan Čikulin, whose grandfather came to Croatia from Italy a hundred years ago and served on the estates of Nikola VI. Zrinski.

=== Međimurje became the possession of Althann Counts ===
Ivan Čikulin's lease over Međimurje did not last long, because already in 1719 the king gave the whole estate to count Johann Michael III. Althann and his wife Anna Maria Josepha Althann (née Pignatelli), who in 1720 were introduced into the property. Counts Althann were old German noble family who lived for a while in Spain, as did the future King Charles, who led the War of the Spanish Succession. Circumstances changed, however, when Charles's older brother Joseph, emperor and Croato-Hungarian king, died in 1711, leaving no heir. Charles remained the only legitimate male Habsburg and replaced his brother on the throne of the Holy Roman Empire and the Croato-Hungarian Kingdom. Count Althann moved to Vienna with him, and a few years later, together with his wife, he got possession of Međimurje. Johann Michael III. and his wife, as well as their descendants later, were the proprietors of Međimurje until 1791.

== Hungarian administration in Međimurje ==
=== Annexation of Međimurje to Zala County ===
For the history of Međimurje it is the year 1720, that is particularly important, because historians have concluded that, after becoming proprietor, Count Johann Michael III. Althann immediately carried out its administrative unification with Zala county, i.e. transferred it from Croatia to Hungary. With that act he enabled the gradual deprivation of national identity of this area in the far north of the country. The situation did not change significantly even when Johann Michael III. was succeeded by his sons and grandsons. They held the office of Zala County ispán in the period from 1721 to 1824.

==== Graphic presentation of the timeline of feudal lords of Međimurje 1200–1923 ====
There is no preserved document that would directly testify to the transfer of the Međimurje from Varaždin County to Zala County, which means from Croatia to Hungary. There are only circumstantial, indirect records that indicate that this happened. These are, first of all, data on the presence of Međimurje nobles at Zala County assembly sessions. At the same time, the church administration still remained in the hands of the Zagreb diocese. Catholic visitors came to Međimurje by order of the Zagreb bishops and they personally distributed the sacraments of the Holy Confirmation in Međimurje parishes and performed other church activities.

=== Međimurje in the second half of the 18th century ===
When Joseph II. of Habsburg, son of Maria Theresa and a great absolutist and reformer, came to the throne in 1780, after her death, he carried out a series of reforms and reorganizations in the country. Međimurje was exposed to increased Germanization. In the years 1785 – 1789, it was under the administration of the Ban (Banus) of Croatia (in the so-called Banska Hrvatska (Banal Croatia), not Zala County. During his reign Joseph II. introduced many reforms in the sense of enlightened absolutism and Germanization of non-German peoples in the Monarchy. In 1781, for instance, he passed the Edict on tolerance among religions, and then the Patent on the abolition of serfdom. He significantly weakened the power and authority of the Church, and for the area of Međimurje it is significant that he abolished the Pauline Church Order.

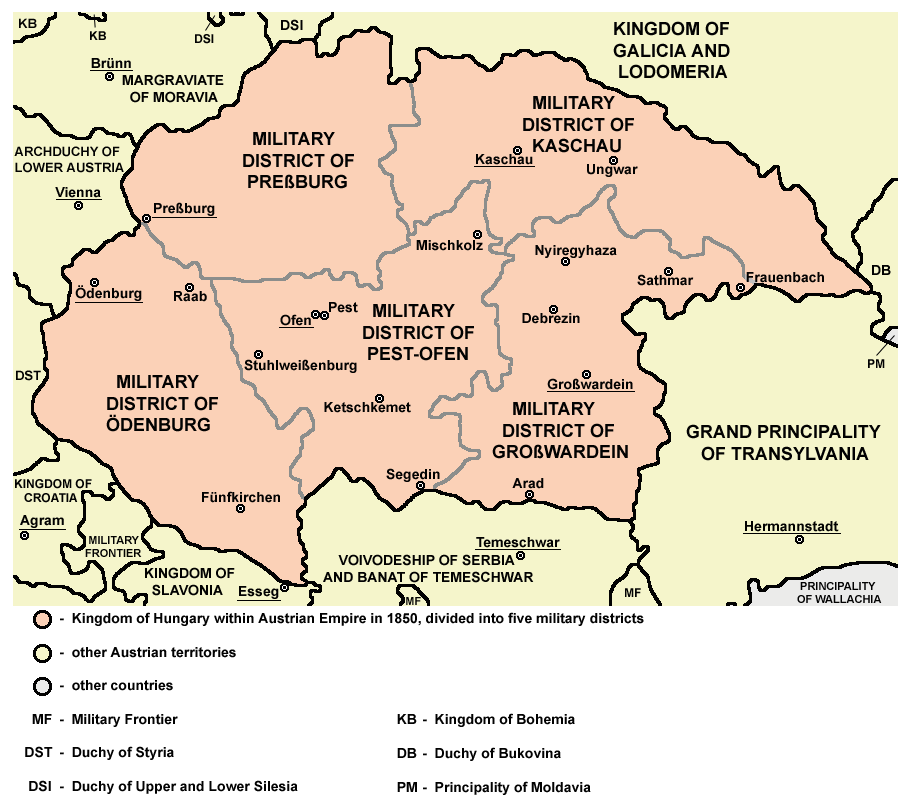
The 1850 map shows Međimurje outside Hungary, as part of the Kingdom of Croatia (bottom left)

The reforms and reorganizations of Joseph II. were not well received in Croatia and Hungary. The Croatian Parliament, to resist Germanization, passed a decision in 1790 on closer ties with Hungary. This, however, led to the opposite effect: fleeing from the Austrians, the Croats fell into the trap of the Hungarians, as the latters gradually began to carry out Hungarianization . Returning after the death of Josip II. to Zala county, Međimurje was particularly exposed to increased and constant pressure on loss of national identity. It was carried out by its new masters, the Feštetić counts, nobles of Croatian origin, but hungarianized during the 17th and 18th century. They bought their new estate in 1791 from Althanns for 1.6 million forints. The exponents of Hungarianization managed to introduce the Hungarian language in schools, state offices, courts and elsewhere, first on a voluntary and optional basis, and from 1827 it became compulsory to learn the Hungarian language in schools.

=== Discontent with Hungarian politics in Croatia in the first half of the 19th century ===
Attempts of Hungarianization caused discontent throughout Croatia, including Međimurje. It grew over the years, culminating in 1848. Then the open conflicts occurred between the Croatian and Hungarian armies, in which Ban Josip Jelačić achieved significant victories for the Croatian side. He crossed the Drava River with his troops and returned Međimurje under Croatian administration. On 11 September 1848, he was given a festive welcome in Čakovec, but that was not the end, because the Hungarians did not give up their aspirations towards the north of Croatia and tried to conquer it again. A tumultuous period followed with several battles, from which Jelačić's army emerged victorious in the end. Officially, the region between the Mura and the Drava was returned to Croatian administration by the decision of the Habsburg Monarchy Ministerial council of 13 December 1849.

=== Short period of Croatian administration and re-annexation to Hungary ===
Međimurje was returned to Varaždin County, which was announced at the county assembly session held on 3 January 1850 in Varaždin. Rudolf Horvat, PhD, a Croatian historian, stated that the entire county then had 178,461 inhabitants. According to the later census of 1857, the number of inhabitants in Međimurje itself amounted to a total of 58,721, of which 612 spoke German as their mother tongue, 517 Hungarian, and the rest Croatian. The area was divided into three districts: Čakovečki, Preloški and Štrigovski.

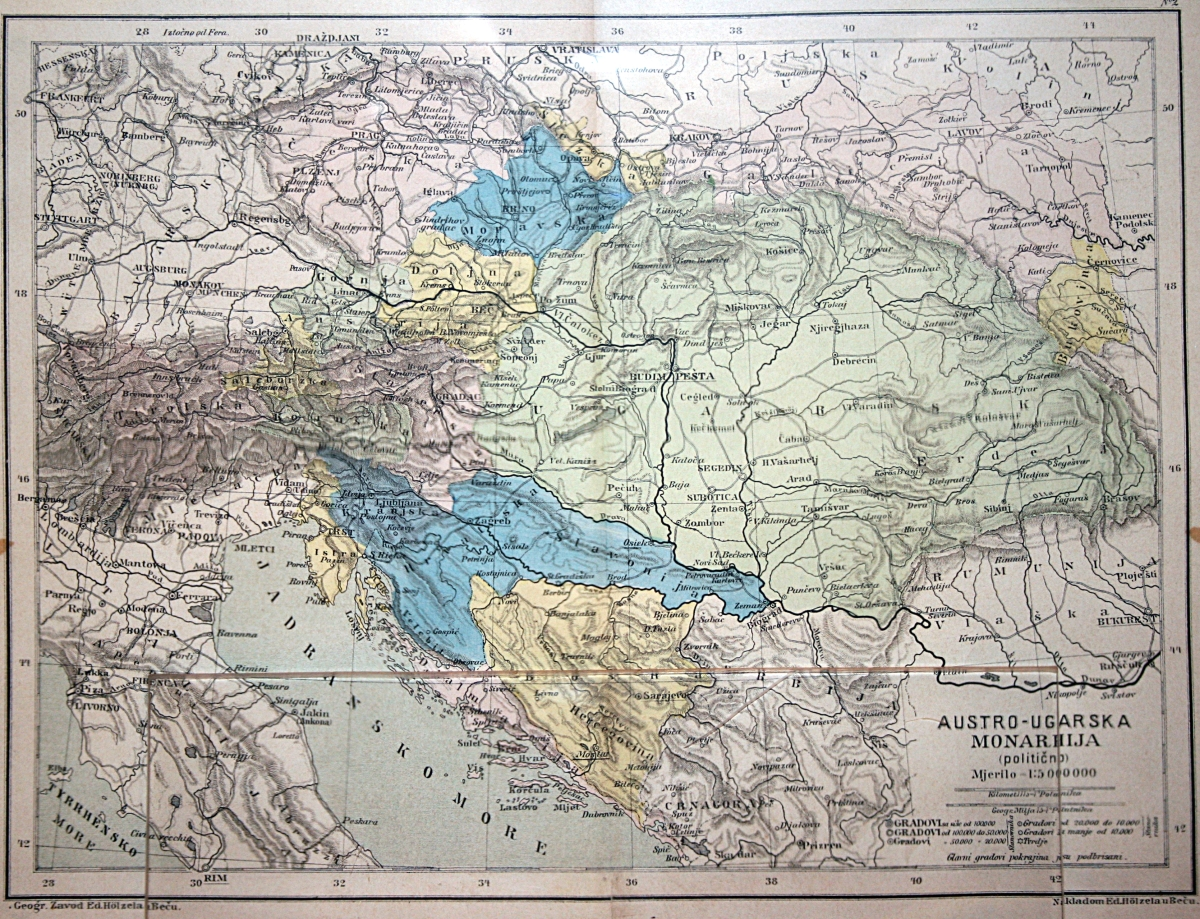
The 1887 map of Austria-Hungary shows Međimurje as part of Hungary (green color), separated from Croatia-Slavonia (blue colour)

It was the time when Bach's absolutism was introduced. The constitution was abolished and Germanization began. This situation lasted until 1860, when absolutism ended and the Hungarians were able to start the process of federalization of the Habsburg Monarchy, the future organization of the entire country as Austro-Hungarian Monarchy. At the same time, Međimurje and the whole of Croatia fell under the Hungarian part. As soon as absolutism was abolished, the Hungarians began persistently and aggressively agitating in Vienna for Međimurje to join Zala County, and the Croatian politicians and people were not strong, loud and fast enough to prevent it. Emperor and King Francis Joseph was under pressure from the Hungarians and on 7 January 1861 he sent a request to the Banus Conference in Zagreb to provide him with evidence of the right for Međimurje to remain part of Croatia. The Banus Conference declared itself incompetent, so it forwarded the request to the Croatian Parliament. Since the latter was not in session at that time due to the preparation of the elections, he could not make a decision on it. Finally, on 26 January 1861, Francis Joseph ordered that Međimurje should be included in Zala County. At the same time, already in January, Hungarian administrators started coming across the Mura river to establish their rule. However, until 12 March, there was also a parallel Croatian administration headed by Anton Globočnik, who on that day, having received an order from the Croatian-Slavonic Royal Regency in Zagreb, surrendered his office to the Hungarian commission and left Međimurje.

=== Situation in Međimurje under Hungarian rule in the period 1861 – 1918 ===
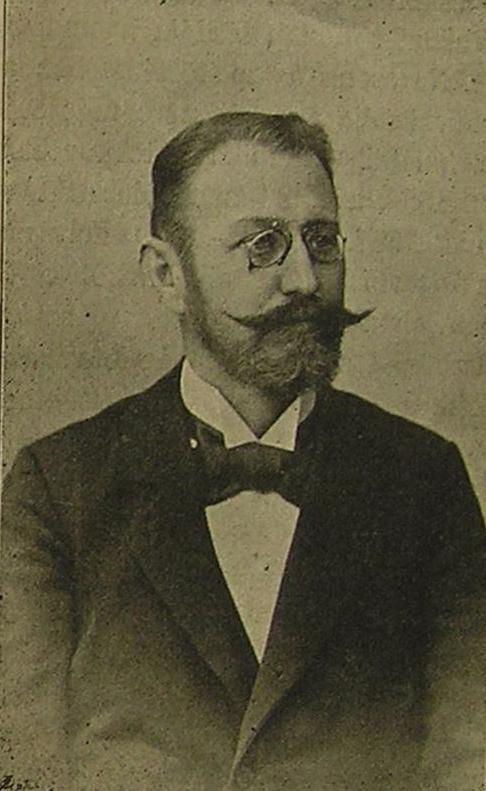
Josip Margitaj (*1854–†1934), alias Margitai József, born as Jožef Majhen, was a Hungarian writer, teacher and politician of Magyaronian orientation from Međimurje.

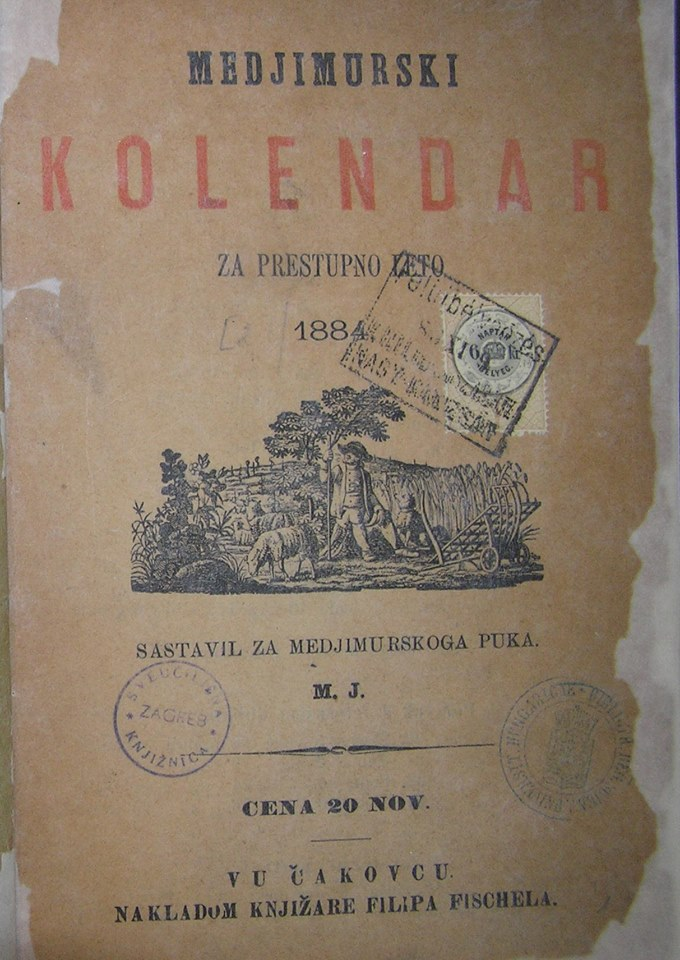
The „Medjimurski kolendar" ("Medjimurian Calendar") from 1884 was an instrument of Hungarianization propaganda. Its editor was Josip Margitaj.

From 1861 particularly difficult moments came for the people of Međimurje, who experienced first-hand what Hungarianization meant. Residents were under pressure on loss of their national identity, which manifested itself through the imposition of a strange, foreign, incomprehensible language, and through exposure to various types of psychological and physical violence, especially if someone resisted this violence. Hungarianization was carried out on children through education in newly established state schools, which increasingly replaced the religious schools where teaching was done in the Croatian language.

In 1879 the Teachers' School or Preparandie was founded in Čakovec, with the intention of educating those who will carry out Hungarianization. In addition to education, Hungarianization was also carried out through publishing, i.e. journalism. In 1884, Josip Margitaj, a writer, teacher and politician of Magyaronian orientation, had the "Medjimurian Calendar" printed, one of the instruments of promoting Hungarianization. In the same year, the magazine "Muraköz-Međimurje" began to be published as a Croatian-Hungarian weekly. Besides Margitaj, exponents of Hungarianization were Károly Zrínyi, Emanuel Kollay, Franjo Glad, Aleksa Rosoci, Viktor Pataki and others. The peak of the violence against the Croatian language occurred in 1898, when the Hungarian government introduced the renaming of all old local geographical names in Međimurje to invented Hungarian names, which had no basis in the spoken language, but were, in some places more and in others less successful, simply Hungarianized. For example, the settlement of Strahoninec became "Drávanagyfalu", Vratišinec "Murasiklós", Sveti Urban "Szentorbánhegy", Sveti Juraj u Trnju "Tüskeszentgyörgy", and Zasadbreg became "Gyümölcshegy".

Concerning the renaming of towns and villages, Juraj Kolarić, PhD, wrote about it: "The Hungarian authorities determined the denomination of all Croatian topographical names. Thus, the ancient historical Croatian names of settlements, villages and cities were renamed into the Hungarian language, which caused disbelief, resistance, public ridicule and humiliations among the people of Međimurje." These caricatured names of Međimurje settlements have remained in Hungary until today, for more than a hundred years.

In his book "The History of Međimurje" published in Varaždin in 1907, Rudolf Horvat, PhD, a Croatian historian, comprehensively enumerated in six points the actions and activities carried out by the Hungarians in Međimurje, which are shown here in abbreviated form:

1. Hungarian was declared the only official language; all official office documents were in Hungarian, which the people did not understand, and officials and judges held discussions and hearings in Hungarian as well; at the same time, the residents were assisted by interpreters, and all judgments, rulings and decisions passed were written only in Hungarian, so the people of Međimurje had to hire lawyers who spoke both languages, to interpret their meaning, etc.
2. the Hungarian government decided that the language of education in municipal schools should be Hungarian instead of Croatian, and later this was also introduced in religious schools where pastors were school supervisors; teaching was very difficult, because the children of Međimurje did not understand the Hungarian language
3. the Hungarian Government established a Teachers' School in Čakovec, where the people of Međimurje, who were imbued with the Hungarian spirit and as "native sons", i.e. Hungarians, were educated to faithfully serve to make children Hungarian in schools
4. Međimurje recruits went to the army in towns where only the Hungarian language was spoken; A native of Međimurje who knew Hungarian well, advanced faster in military service; if he met a Hungarian girl as a soldier and later married her, everything would be done to make such a family Hungarian
5. Hungarianization was carried out with the help of the church, so that a new law was passed according to which children in schools must pray in Hungarian, and also have religious education and school ceremonies with a church sermon also in Hungarian
6. to de-nationalize the people of Međimurje from the Croatian people, the Hungarians began to prove that they are a special people, who also have their own language; that language was somewhat modified, some Hungarian words were inserted, and then newspapers or prayer book were printed in it

=== Resistance of Medjimurians to aggressive Hungarianization ===
The introduction of the Hungarian language as an official language resulted in the rapid immigration of Hungarians to Međimurje. Many of them opened law offices, employing educated people from Međimurje as scribes. Along with the local people, there were mostly Croat priests, who managed to resist the Hungarian pressure. Most of them were humble and disinclined to open conflict and resistance to Hungarianization, but there were also those who persistently resisted it. Among them were Stjepan Šadl in Macinec, Ivan Ivko in Štrigova, Mihael Gašparlin in Gornji Mihaljevec and Zvonimir Jurak in Sveti Juraj na Bregu. Such people were persecuted by the Hungarian authorities, so some ended up in prison.

Resistance was offered by others, among them prominent intellectuals of the time, such as the distinguished lawyer Ivan Nepomuk Novak PhD (*1884–†1934), a writer, publisher and folk revivalist born in Macinec. Apart from him, the lawyer and mayor of Varaždin, Pero Magdić PhD, who started the newspaper "Naše pravice" (*Our rights) in Varaždin in 1904, followed by the Croatian academician, ethnomusicologist and composer Vinko Žganec PhD, chaplain Stjepan Vidušić PhD, Prof. Pavao Lisjak, director of a gymnasium in Zagreb and Teachers' School in Čakovec, and many others.

However, the impossibility of establishing a newsletter for national awareness and enlightenment was one of the biggest problems for the supporters for the return of Međimurje under Croatian rule. In addition, the language of the people of Međimurje, which has a Kajkavian basis, was also a problem, as opposed to the official literary language in Croatia, which is based on Shtokavian dialect. Hungarians and Magyarons (Croats who advocated closer ties with Hungary), tried to take advantage of these differences by constructing a new, so called "Medjimurian language", with Hungarian loanwords thrown in, with which they wanted to prove that the Medjimurians are a different people, different from the Croats across the Drava.

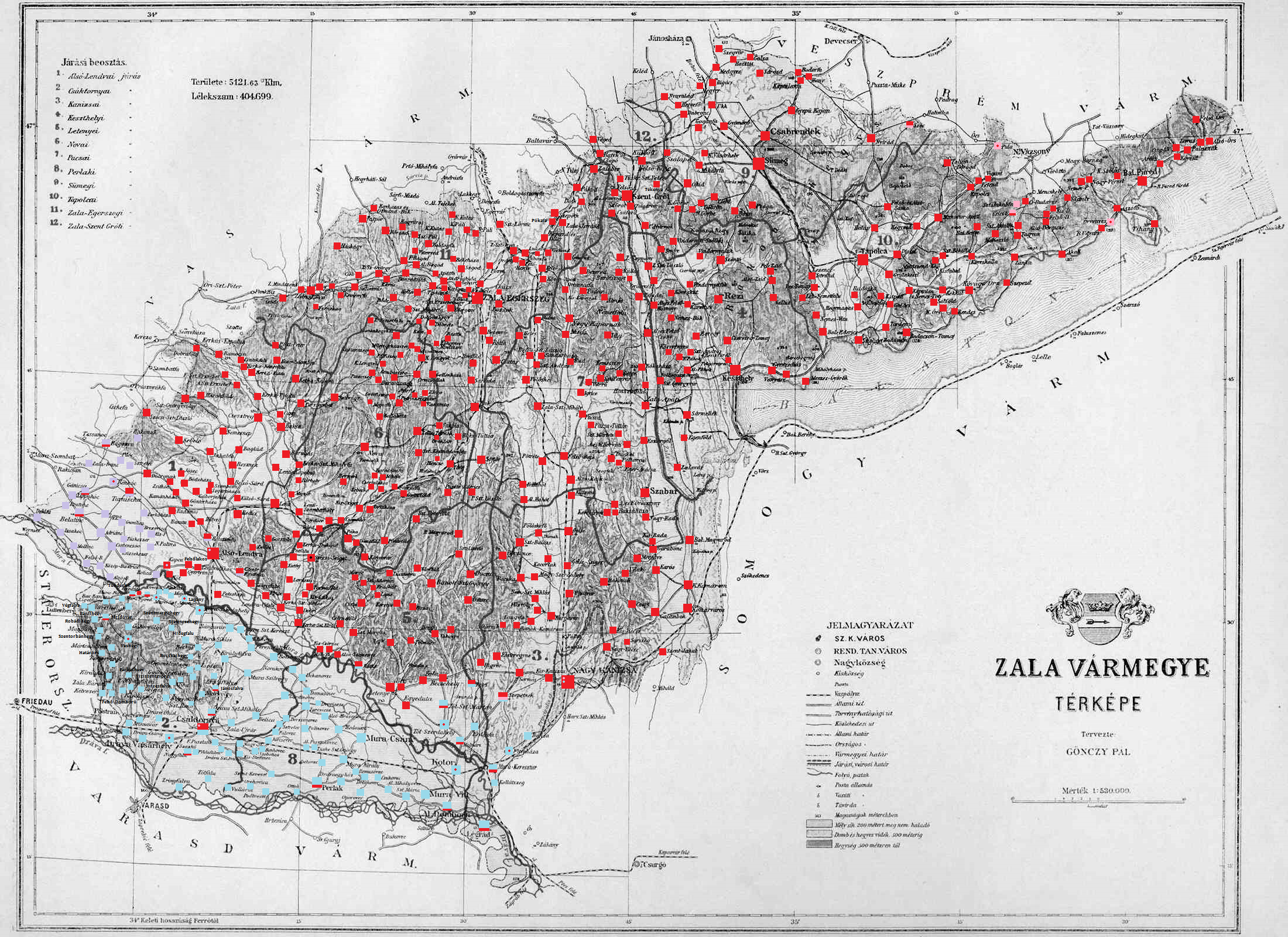
Ethnographic map of the Hungarian Zala County according to the 1910 census with Međimurje in the southwest

Intensive Hungarianization of the Croatian population in Međimurje can be seen from the structure of the figures determined in the population censuses. According to the 1900 census, 81,115 inhabitants lived in Međimurje, of which 75,663 were Croats (93.27%), 4,401 Hungarians (5.42%), 689 Germans, 118 Romanians, 26 Slovaks, etc. (Σ1.31%). In 1910, the situation changed quite a bit, because according to the census of that year, Međimurje had 90,387 people, of which 82,829 Croats (91.62%), 6,766 Hungarians (7.48%), 396 Germans, 35 Serbs, 22 Slovaks, 6 Romanians, etc. (Σ0.9%). A significant increase in the share of Hungarians in the population is visible within only ten years.

=== Međimurje and Medjimurians in the First World War ===
At the beginning of First World War, the Hungarian authorities called the people of Međimurje to serve in the army under the joint Austro-Hungarian command. They were sent to various battlefields, among which was the infamous Galicia, where they fought against the Russians and where many of them died, were captured or disappeared. The Hungarian government introduced the wartime support and the so-called housing allowance for their families, but life was still difficult, because there was a constant lack of food, clothing and shoes. Infectious diseases were common, such as tuberculosis, typhoid and dysentery, and then in 1918 the spanish flu came to Međimurje, which significantly increased mortality.

At the end of the war, the people of Međimurje, who returned from the front in October and November 1918, participated, together with the rest of the population, who were not mobilized in the war, in liberating their native region from the Hungarian authorities, which at that time, due to the collapse of the long-lived Monarchy, were partly in disarray, but their forces still offered a strong resistance.

== Cessation of the Hungarian administration in Međimurje ==
The end of almost two hundred years of Hungarian administration in the area of Međimurje was marked by bloody conflicts between the local population and members of the Hungarian authorities, to whom the police and army were hired to help, including Hungarian soldiers and sailors returning from the Italian battlefields and the Adriatic war ports to Hungary after the end of the First World War. They mostly returned on the trains that passed through Međimurje and often stopped for a long time at the local railway stations, because they had no timetable. At the same time, hungry and thirsty Hungarian war returnees left the station for nearby populated places to get food, which did not always go without violence ] and robbery.

In the conflicts between the Hungarians and the local Medjimurians during November and December 1918, many innocent people died. At that time, a court-martial, the so-called "Štatarium", was introduced. Some of the people were shot by the Hungarian authorities, others were hanged, and all of them were left dead on the execution ground for another three days as a warning to others, to see what awaits them if they rebel.

=== Organizational preparations and military operations for liberation of Međimurje ===
The reaction in other parts of Croatia to the murders of the people in Međimurje and general terror of the population was establishment of the National Council for Međimurje in the first half of November 1918. In several Croatian towns like Karlovac Sisak, Zagreb, Varaždin and some others, Croatian soldiers gathered and prepared for an action in Međimurje.

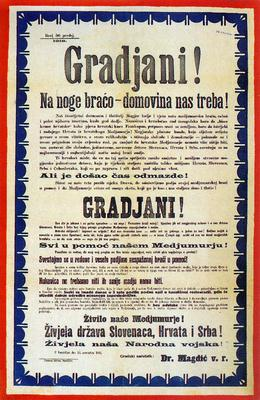
A call to the population of Croatia to mobilize for the liberation of Međimurje and its annexation to the newly created State of Slovenes, Croats and Serbs, which was announced by the administration of the City of Varaždin and signed by Mayor Dr. Magdić on 13 November 1918

Ivan Nepomuk Novak, PhD, a lawyer, chaired the 15-member National Council for Međimurje, which also included Vinko Žganec, Kapistran Geci, Franjo Glogovec and Stjepan Vidušić (who was the secretary of the council), and one representative from each administrative municipality at the time. Since the violence of the Hungarians against the Medjimurians was increasing every day and there was no time to wait, the Council decided on 13 November 1918 that the armed Croatian units formed until then in Varaždin, would set out to liberate Međimurje, although they were not particularly large (about 300 men). Opposite them stood a more numerous and well-equipped Hungarian army led by lieutenant colonel György Kühn, together with major Károly Györi, commander of the unit in Čakovec.

Croatian forces, commanded by major Ivan Tomašević, succeeded in liberating Nedelišće and marched towards Čakovec, but the Hungarians, having received reinforcements from Nagykanizsa, defended the city. Realizing that they would not succeed, the Croatian troops, exposed to enemy fire, retreated back to Varaždin. Despite the failure, that first attempt contributed to even greater determination to liberate Međimurje. To prevent the next liberation attempt from failing, a larger military contingent was formed, which would be sufficient for a successful operation. Lieutenant-colonel Slavko Kvaternik took command of seven infantry battalions, two cavalry squadrons, four artillery battalions with a total of 24 cannons and several other special and auxiliary units, a total strength of around 3,000–4,000 men.

Kvaternik's troops gathered in Varaždin until 20 December 1918, where it was decided to form two main groups that would enter Međimurje from two directions. They were led by experienced officers, such as lieutenant-colonel Dragutin Perko, majors Ivan Tomašević, Josip Špoljar, Karlo Pogledić, Marko Georgijević and Ivo Henneberg, captains Stjepan Sertić, Radoslav Rački, Matija Čanić and Erminij Jurišić, as well as first lieutenant Franjo Glogovec, who commanded the local "Međimurje volunteer company". In Međimurje itself, there were still Hungarian units under the command of lieutenant-colonel Kühn and major Györi, but now as part of the newly established (however, internationally unrecognized) army of Democratic Republic of Hungary.

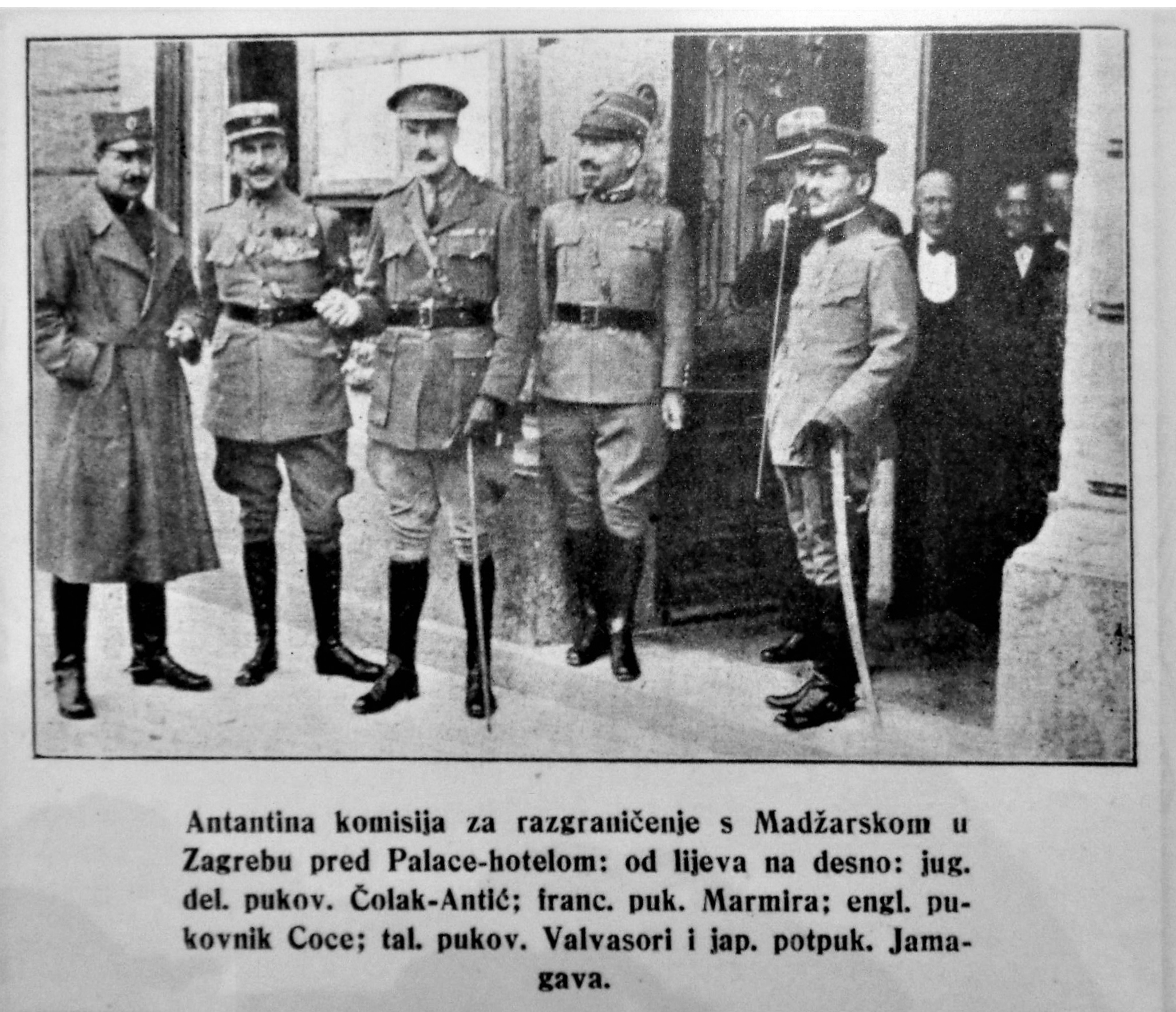
Members of the Entente Commission for the demarcation of the State of Slovenes, Croats and Serbs (SHS) with Hungary in front of the Palace Hotel in Zagreb

The liberation operation began on Christmas Eve, 24 December 1918, at 6 am, and was successfully completed, without significant casualties, within seven hours, with the surrender of the Hungarian troops. In the afternoon of the same day, people from all over Međimurje spontaneously began to gather in Čakovec. The mass of people was so large that they could not all fit in one hall, but gathered in the large schoolyard of the Civil School, where a gathering of support and joy that Međimurje was liberated was held. Ivan N. Novak was the first to speak at the gathering, followed by other members of the National Council for Međimurje. After that, the mass of people from the meeting passed through the town centre, where in the meantime all the Hungarian nameplates on the streets, squares, shops and artisan shops were quickly replaced. Members of the overthrown Hungarian administration who committed crimes were placed in prison on the same day. At the end of the day, a little before midnight, the people once again gathered in the Franciscan church of St. Nicholas in the center of Čakovec, and attended midnight mass. At the same time, Christmas carols were sung, as well as the national anthem Lijepa naša domovino.

=== Political confirmation of separation from Hungary and return to Croatia ===
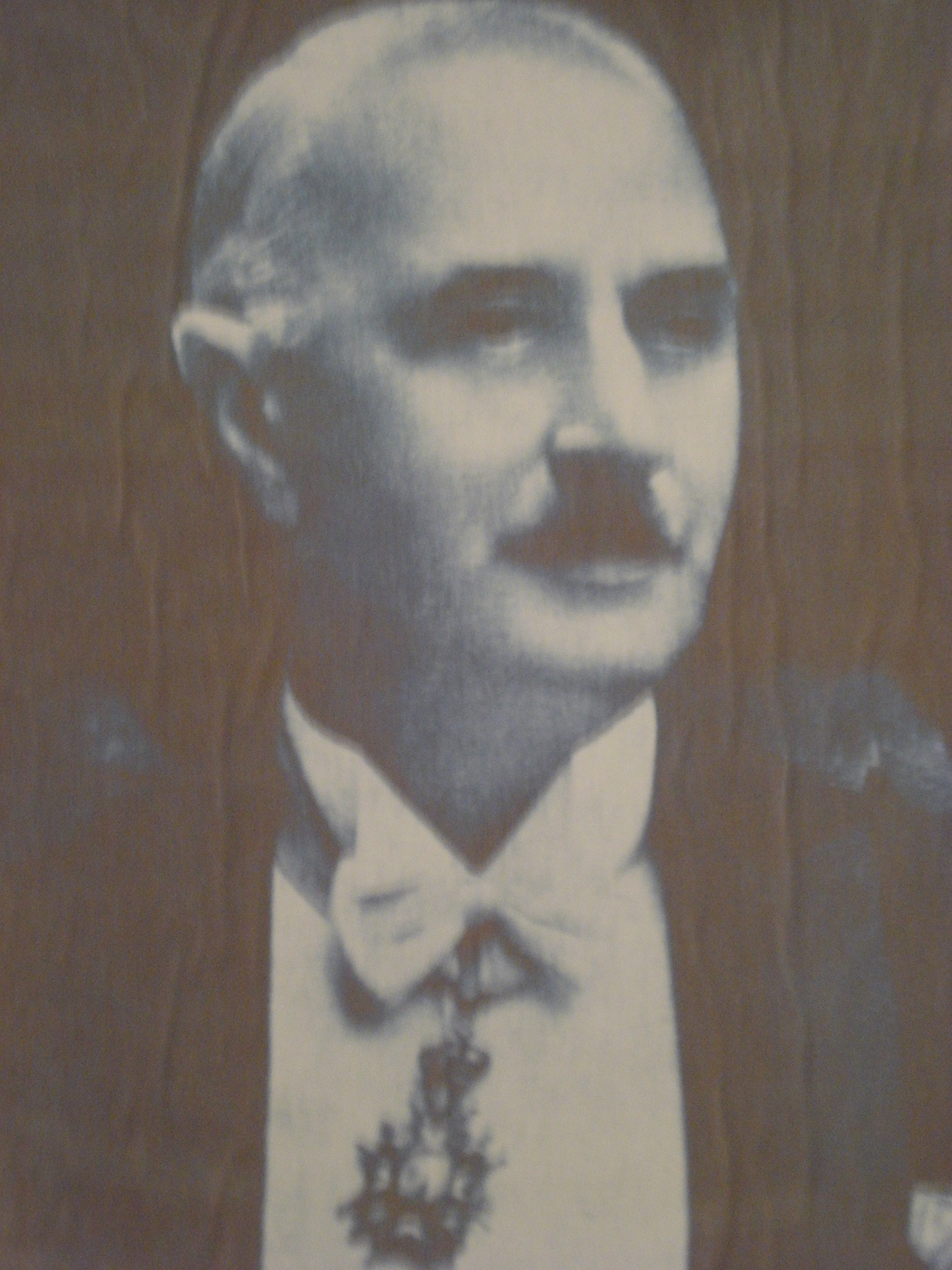
Lieutenant colonel Dragutin Perko, the first governor of liberated Međimurje

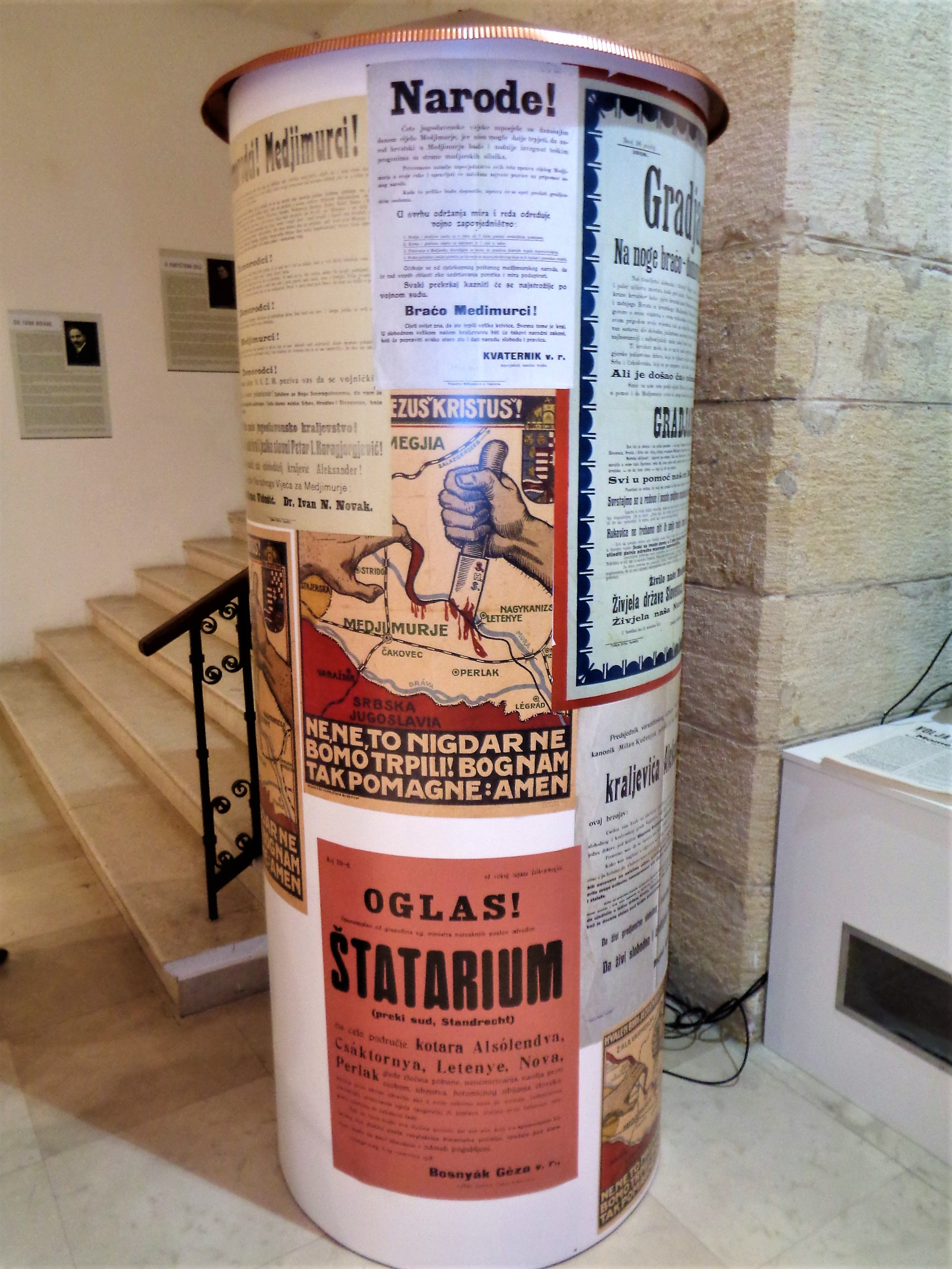
Posters displayed in Međimurje County Museum during the exhibition of the 100th anniversary of the liberation of Medjimurje from Hungarian administration

Međimurje was liberated by a military operation, but everything had to be legalized, so the National Council for Međimurje decided that on 9 January 1919, a great public assembly would be held in Čakovec. On that day, over 10,000 people gathered in Franciscan square in front of the church of St. Nicholas. The assembly was opened by Father Kapistran Geci, head of the Čakovec Franciscan monastery, who proposed the chairman and members of the presidency. During the work of the assembly, one of the most important documents in the history of Međimurje was adopted – The Resolution on the secession of Međimurje from the Hungarian State.

Međimurje's belonging to Croatia was confirmed within the framework of the Paris Peace Conference, during which the Treaty of Trianon was prepared and signed on 4 June 1920. It defined the border of the newly created states of Hungary and the Kingdom of Serbs, Croats and Slovenes.

== Legacy ==
Immediately after the remerging of Međimurje with Croatia, lieutenant colonel Dragutin Perko became its first governor. He appointed major Josip Špoljar as the local commander of Čakovec. At the same time, Croatian officials replaced Hungarian ones in the offices, and Croatian teachers took over teaching the Croatian language in schools. A little later, Perko was replaced by Ivan N. Novak, the chairman of the National Council for Međimurje, becoming the first civil administrator of Međimurje.

When the Treaty of Trianon was concluded, the Government of the Kingdom of Serbs, Croats and Slovenes took control of the entire area. Serbian soldiers, gendarmes, customs officers and officials were sent from Belgrade to Međimurje to try to artificially create Yugoslavs from the people of Međimurje by means of pressure and coercion. However, this did not work, just like the Hungarians did before, for the next twenty years, and then the Second World War began. Due to a combination of circumstances, at the beginning of that war, another opportunity arose for Hungarians and they took advantage of it, occupying Međimurje once again, for the last time, in 1941. This time it was treated as the most ordinary occupation, to which the Government of the newly formed Independent State of Croatia reacted strongly, but failed to restore the previous state.

After the occupation, intensive Hungarianization began again, which, among other things, meant compulsory learning of the Hungarian language in schools, so that even today the oldest citizens of Međimurje understand the Hungarian language. That occupation finally ended in 1945, when the Allied army drove the Hungarian forces out of Međimurje.

On the hundredth anniversary of the liberation and secession of Međimurje from Hungary, a commemorative exhibition was held in Čakovec at the beginning of 2019 in the Međimurje County Museum, which lasted from 8 January to 28 March 2019.

== See also ==
- List of feudal lords of Međimurje
- Regions of Croatia
- History of Croatia
- Zagreb Resolution
