= Hortense (disambiguation) =

Hortense is a feminine given name. It may also refer to:

- Hurricane Hortense (disambiguation)
- Hortense-class frigate
  - French frigate Hortense (1803), lead ship of the class
- Hortense, Georgia, an unincorporated community in the United States
