= Monath =

Monath is a name. Notable people who had or have this name include the following:

== Given name ==
- Monath Perera (1982–2011), Sri Lankan fighter pilot

== Surname ==
- Berndt Monath (born 1960), German historian
- Elizabeth Burger Monath (1907–1986), Austrian artist
- Hortense Monath (1905–1956), American pianist
- Martin Monath (1913–1944), German Jewish resistance fighter
- Peter Conrad Monath (1695–1747), German printer
  - Georg Peter Monath (1715–1788), German bookseller, son of Peter Conrad Monath
