= Hortense =

- Gender: Feminine

Origin
- Region of origin: French

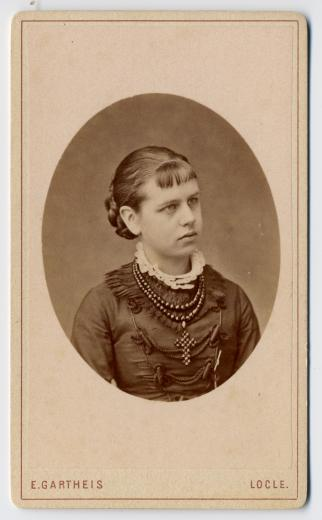
Madame Hortense Alice Marie Römer-Schwab (1866)

Hortense is a French feminine given name that comes from Latin meaning gardener. It may refer to:

== People with the given name ==
- Hortense Allart (1801–1879), Italian-French feminist writer and essayist
- Hortense de Beauharnais (1783–1837), stepdaughter of Napoleon and Queen consort of Holland
- Hortense Béwouda (born 1978), sprinter from Cameroon
- Hortense Clews (1926–2006), member of the Belgian Resistance in World War II
- Hortense Dufour (born 1946), French writer
- Hortense Ellis (1941–2000), Jamaican reggae singer
- Hortense Calisher (1911–2009), American fiction writer, author of In the Absence of Angels
- Hortense Gabel (1912–1990), New York Supreme Court Justice
- Hortense Globensky-Prévost (1804–1873), Canadian heroine
- Hortense Gordon (1886–1961), Canadian abstract painter
- Hortense Haudebourt-Lescot (1784–1845), French painter of genre scenes
- Hortense Mancini (1646–1699), Duchess of Mazarin and a mistress of Charles II, King of England
- Hortense Monath (1905–1956), American pianist
- Hortense Powdermaker (1900–1970), American anthropologist
- Hortense Parker (1859–1938), music teacher and daughter of African–American inventor, industrialist and abolitionist John Parker
- Hortense Rhéa (1844–1899), French actress
- Hortense Schneider (1833–1920), French soprano
- Hortense Sparks Ward (1872–1944), pioneering Texas lawyer and women's rights activist
- Hortense Spillers (born 1942), American literary critic and theorist of Black studies

== Fictional characters ==
- Hortense Bellacourt, the unattractive eldest of the Bellacourt sisters in the Another Period tv series
- Hortense Briggs, in the novel An American Tragedy by Theodore Dreiser
- Hortense Cumberbatch, in the film Secrets & Lies by British director, Mike Leigh
- Hortense Daigle, portrayed by Eileen Heckart in The Bad Seed play and film
- Hortense Derry, as Frank Derry’s Dana Andrews stepmother, portrayed by Gladys George in the film The Best Years of Our Lives
- Hortense McDuck, a Disney character who is Scrooge McDuck's sister and Donald Duck's mother
- Hortense, adopted sister of Michael Roberts in the novel Small Island by Andrea Levy
- Hortense Toomey Campanati, in the novel Earthly Powers by Anthony Burgess
- Mademoiselle Hortense, in the novel Bleak House by Charles Dickens
- Hortense, later known as Mist, from the Guardians of Ga'Hoole series by Kathryn Lasky
- Hortense, Donald Duck's pet in comic books and a cartoon – see Donald's Ostrich
- Hortense, Sapphire's sister in the TV show Amos 'n' Andy.
- Hortense, another Disney character who was the horse of young Scrooge McDuck and was named after Scrooge's sister
- Hortense, brothel madam in the TV show Maison Close
- Hortense the Hornbill from Jim Henson's Animal Show
- Two members of the extended Simpson family: Aunt Hortense, who died prior to the events of "Bart Gets Hit by a Car"; and Great Aunt Hortense, who died prior to the events of "Bart the Fink"
