= L'école buissonnière =

- Directed by: Nicolas Vanier
- Produced by: Clément Miserez; Matthieu Warter
- Starring: Jean Scandel; François Cluzet; Éric Elmosnino; Valérie Karsenti; François Berléand
- Cinematography: Éric Guichard
- Edited by: Raphaele Urtin
- Music by: Armand Amar
- Production company: Radar Films
- Distributed by: StudioCanal
- Release date: 11 October 2017
- Running time: 116 minutes
- Country: France
- Language: French
- Budget: $8.5 million
- Box office: $14.9 million

L'école buissonnière (English: Skip School) is a 2017 French comedy-drama film directed by Nicolas Vanier.

== Plot ==
Alongside Totoche, Paul will make a school out of life, out of nature's secrets, and learn to clean fish and everything there is to know about game, mushrooms, and plants.

1927. Paul, a boy orphaned during the WWI, comes to the Count of Fresnaye's estate to live with a foster family: Célestine, a maid at the manor, and her husband Borel, the gamekeeper. Left mostly to himself, and warned against showing up at the castle, because the Count doesn't tolerate children, Paul begins to explore the surrounding wilderness. He becomes friend with Totoche, a notorious poacher, who teaches him woodcraft. Borel is obsessed with catching Totoche, and Paul becomes mingled in the complicated relationship between Totoche, Borel and Célestine. Paul begins to suspect that his parents' connection to the locality is deeper than he was told. Meanwhile, Paul makes acquaintance with the Count, who warms up to the boy as he sees his interest in the outdoors. As they examine the Count's red deer trophy collection, the boy mentions he saw a deer with even bigger antlers in the Count's woods. In the course of the hunt after the deer the Count suffers a bad fall from a horse. The estate is about to pass to the Count's no-good son, a blatant egoist with property development ideas that would ruin the environment. But a dark family secret turns out to be a blessing.

== Cast ==
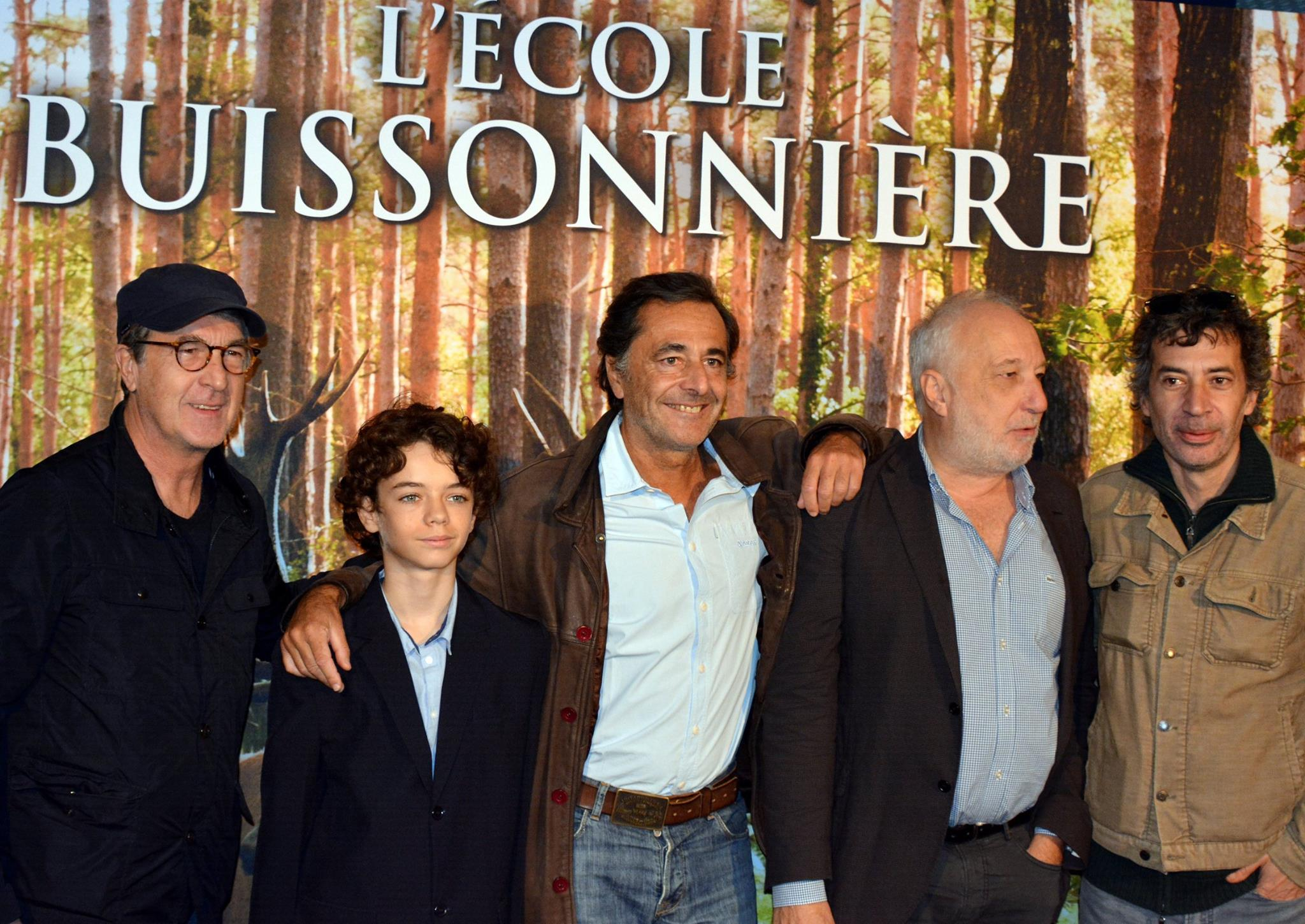
Director and lead actors at a premiere, October 2017.

- Jean Scandel as Paul
- François Cluzet as Totoche
- Éric Elmosnino as Borel
- Valérie Karsenti as Célestine
- François Berléand as Count of Fresnaye
- Urbain Cancelier as Lucien

== Production ==
Filming for the movie began on 19 September 2016 in Sologne, Chambord, Loir-et-Cher, Beaugency, La Ferté-Saint-Cyr and Brinon-sur-Sauldre and wrapped up on 25 November in the same year.
