= Paid (2006 film) =

- Directed by: Laurence Lamers
- Written by: Laurence Lamers
- Produced by: Silvester Slavenburg
- Starring: Anne Charrier; Murilo Benício; Tom Conti; Guy Marchand; Corbin Bernsen; Beppe Clerici; Fendi van Brederode; Tygo Gernandt; Hajo Bruins
- Cinematography: Tom Erisman
- Edited by: Martyn Gould
- Music by: Jaques Morelenbaum
- Distributed by: Vivendi Entertainment; Lightyear Entertainment
- Release date: September 25, 2006
- Running time: 91 min.
- Country: Netherlands
- Language: English / Portuguese
- Budget: $1,500,000

Paid is a 2006 English-language feature film directed by Laurence Lamers. It was filmed in Netherlands between 2004 and 2005 with Anne Charrier, Murilo Benício, Tom Conti, Guy Marchand, Corbin Bernsen, Marie-France Pisier, Beppe Clerici and Tygo Gernandt.

== Production ==
The film was particular for the Dutch film industry as it was made without public funds, privately financed and it combined a mix of nationalities, which made it an international orientated film. The actors came from France, USA, Britain, Italy, Brazil, and The Netherlands. If we look to minor extra roles, also Peru, Colombia and Venezuela.

The music was composed by the Brazilian composer Jaques Morelenbaum (Central Station) and the sound was mixed in Belgium by Alek Goosse. The film is being sold worldwide by a Swedish company called NonStop Sales.

The period between production and completing the film in post production took a while, because of availabilities of shooting. The production was planned for 25 days. After a week they had to replace the child and had to re-shoot 4 days within the 25 days. During editing there were re-shoots. One day in Brazil, Rio de Janeiro and two days in Amsterdam. The total editing period was 38 days. The final mix had to end till the end of 2005.

The production costs were 1.5 million Euros.

== Premiere ==
The film had its world premiere on 25 September 2006 in the Tuschinski Theatre in Amsterdam.

== Music ==
The music was composed by Jaques Morelenbaum, one of Brazil's most respected musicians. He arranged the music in the studio of Léo Gandelman in Rio de Janeiro, in the neighborhood of Ipanema.

His wife Paula Morelenbaum sang the end title music "Bésame Mucho".

== Cast ==
- Anne Charrier - Paula
- Murilo Benício - Michel
- Tom Conti - Rudi
- Guy Marchand - Giuseppe
- Fendi van Brederode - Luis
- Corbin Bernsen - William Montague
- Tygo Gernandt - Bennie
- Hajo Bruins - Andre
- Beppe Clerici - Max
- Helmert Woudenberg - Cor
- Manouk van der Meulen - Anna
- Marie-France Pisier - Gislaine
- Ana Lúcia Torre - maid

== Crew ==
- Director & Screenwriter: Laurence Lamers
- D.O.P: Tom Erisman
- Editor: Martyn Gould
- Composer: Jaques Morelenbaum
- Art-Director: Dimitri Merkoulov
- Producer: Silvester Slavenburg
- Line-Producer: Martin Lagestee
- Executive Producers: Franco Sama, Jordan Yale Levine
- Production Company: Slavenburg Films

== Distribution ==
Paramount Home Video (DVD Netherlands 2007) Waterwood Films (Theatrical Netherlands 2007) Vivendi Universal (DVD USA/Canada 2009) Lightyear Entertainment (all other media USA/Canada 2009)

== Festivals ==
The film was shown at the following festivals:

- The Dutch Festival (The Netherlands)
- Mostra de São Paulo (Brazil)
- Filmfest von Braunschwick (Germany)
- Dereel Festival of Melbourne (Australia)
- The New Orleans Film Festival (USA)
- The Exground Film Festival of Wiesbaden (Germany)
