= Strahoninec =

- Municipality
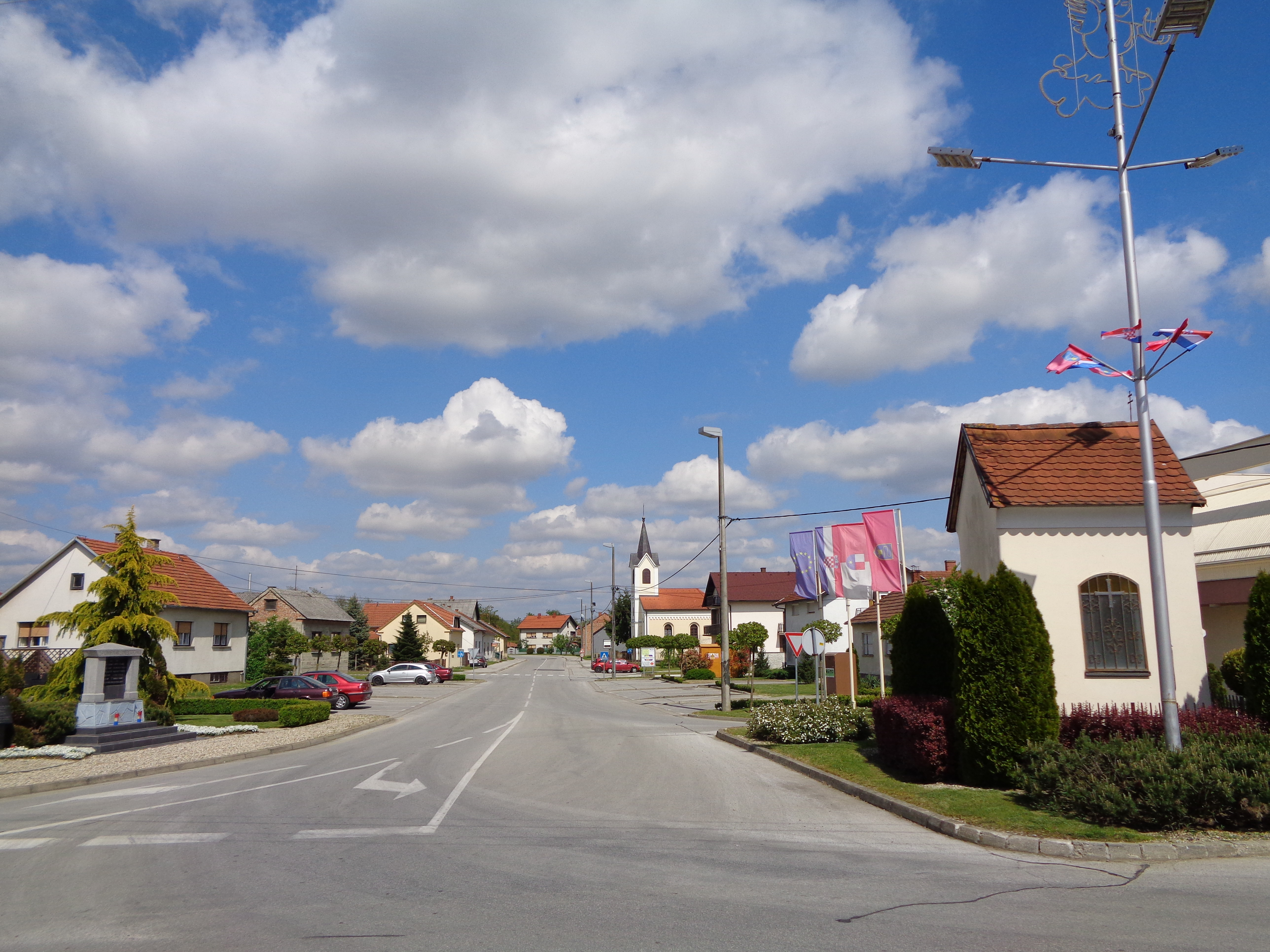
- Village centre

- Location within Croatia
- Coordinates: 46°22′N 16°25′E
- Country: Croatia
- Region: Northern Croatia (Međimurje)
- County: Međimurje County

Government
  - Municipal mayor: Franjo Lehkec (HSS)

Area
  - Municipality: 8.4 km^{2} (3.2 sq mi)
  - Urban: 8.4 km^{2} (3.2 sq mi)

Population (2021)
  - Municipality: 2,598
  - Density: 310/km^{2} (800/sq mi)
  - Urban: 2,598
  - Urban density: 310/km^{2} (800/sq mi)
- Time zone: UTC+1 (CET)
  - Summer (DST): UTC+2 (CEST)
- Postal code: 40000 Čakovec
- Area code: 040
- Website: strahoninec.hr

Strahoninec (Hungarian: Drávanagyfalu) is a municipality in Međimurje County, Croatia.

== History ==
Strahoninec was first mentioned in 1478 as Strahoninecz in the list of settlements belonging to the Čakovec area. In 1564, it was mentioned as Judicatus Strahonincs but in 1672, Strahoninec was mentioned as part of the Nedelišće judicatus. In 1718, it belonged to the Mihovljan judicatus, but was again mentioned as part of the Nedelišće judicatus three years later, in 1721.

The first organised census in the Međimurje region was conducted in 1786. According to it, there were 44 houses in Strahoninec, accommodating 56 families and a population of 384. The census conducted in 1828 showed there were 48 houses in the village, accommodating a predominantly Roman Catholic population of 385. The name of the village in that census was Ztrahominec. It was derived from strah, the Croatian word for "fear", and minuti, which means "to pass" or "to go away". According to legend, the village got its name because the people who travelled through the area were afraid of a large forest they had to go through after crossing the Drava, but once they entered the village, their fears were gone.

In the 1828 census, the hamlet of Poleve was mentioned for the first time. However, neither its population nor the number of houses were mentioned. In 1868, the hamlet was mentioned as Polevo, and was part of the village of Strahoninec and in the 1910 census, it was mentioned under the Hungarian name, Szépmajor, and had a population of 91.

Strahoninec was also known by a Hungarian name, Nagyfalu, at the beginning of the 20th century. In the 1900 census, it had a population of 777. At the time, there were 724 Croats, 44 Hungarians and 8 Germans living in the village. It was part of the Čakovec district (Hungarian: Csáktornyai járás) of Zala County in the Kingdom of Hungary until the Treaty of Trianon was signed in 1920.

It then became part of the Kingdom of Yugoslavia. In 1921, Strahoninec became the seat of a municipality, which also included Kuršanec, Poleve and Totovec. In 1941, it became a part of Hungary again, as the entire Međimurje region was annexed by Hungary until 1945. At the time, the village was known as Drávanagyfalu, which is still the name used for it in Hungarian. The majority of the population in 1941 identified themselves as Hungarians.

After World War II, it became part of Croatia within the Federal People's Republic of Yugoslavia. In the 1953 census, the village of Strahoninec had a population of 1,386. At the time, it was the seat of a municipality, which also included the villages of Šandorovec and Totovec. In 1955, it became a part of the Čakovec municipality.

Following the independence of Croatia, Strahoninec was part of the wider area of the city of Čakovec. On 17 May 1997, it officially became a separate municipality.

== Geography ==
The village of Strahoninec is located next to the southern limits of Čakovec, the county seat of Međimurje County and it borders Nedelišće to the west. The total area of the municipality is 8,35 km².

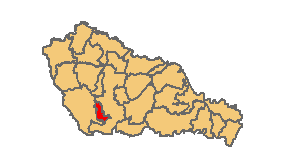
Location within Međimurje County

== Demographics ==
According to the 2021 census, the municipality had a total population of 2,598. Strahoninec is the only village in the municipality. The majority of inhabitants are Croats making up 98.04% of population.

Strahoninec: Population trends 1857–2021
v

population	448	589	617	703	777	788	870	1088	1265	1386	1538	1821	2357	2580	2728	2682	2598
	1857	1869	1880	1890	1900	1910	1921	1931	1948	1953	1961	1971	1981	1991	2001	2011	2021

Sources: Croatian Bureau of Statistics publications

== Administration ==
The current mayor of Strahoninec is Franjo Lehkec and the Strahoninec Municipal Council consists of 13 seats.

Groups	Councilors per group
HNS-HSLS-HDZ-HS	9 / 13
SDP	4 / 13

== Culture ==
There are currently 11 associations operating in Strahoninec:

- VFD Strahoninec
- Cultural and Artistic Society Strahoninec
- FC Strahoninec
- Strahoninec Football School
- Strahoninec Chess Club
- Strahoninec Shooting Club
- KU Creative Association
- Association of Coeliac Disease Patients of Northwest Croatia
- Strahoninec Pensioners Association
- Strahoninec Women's Association
- Association of Volunteers and Veterans of the Homeland War Strahoninec

== Education ==
- Kindergarten "Sunflower"
- Strahoninec Elementary School

== Gallery ==
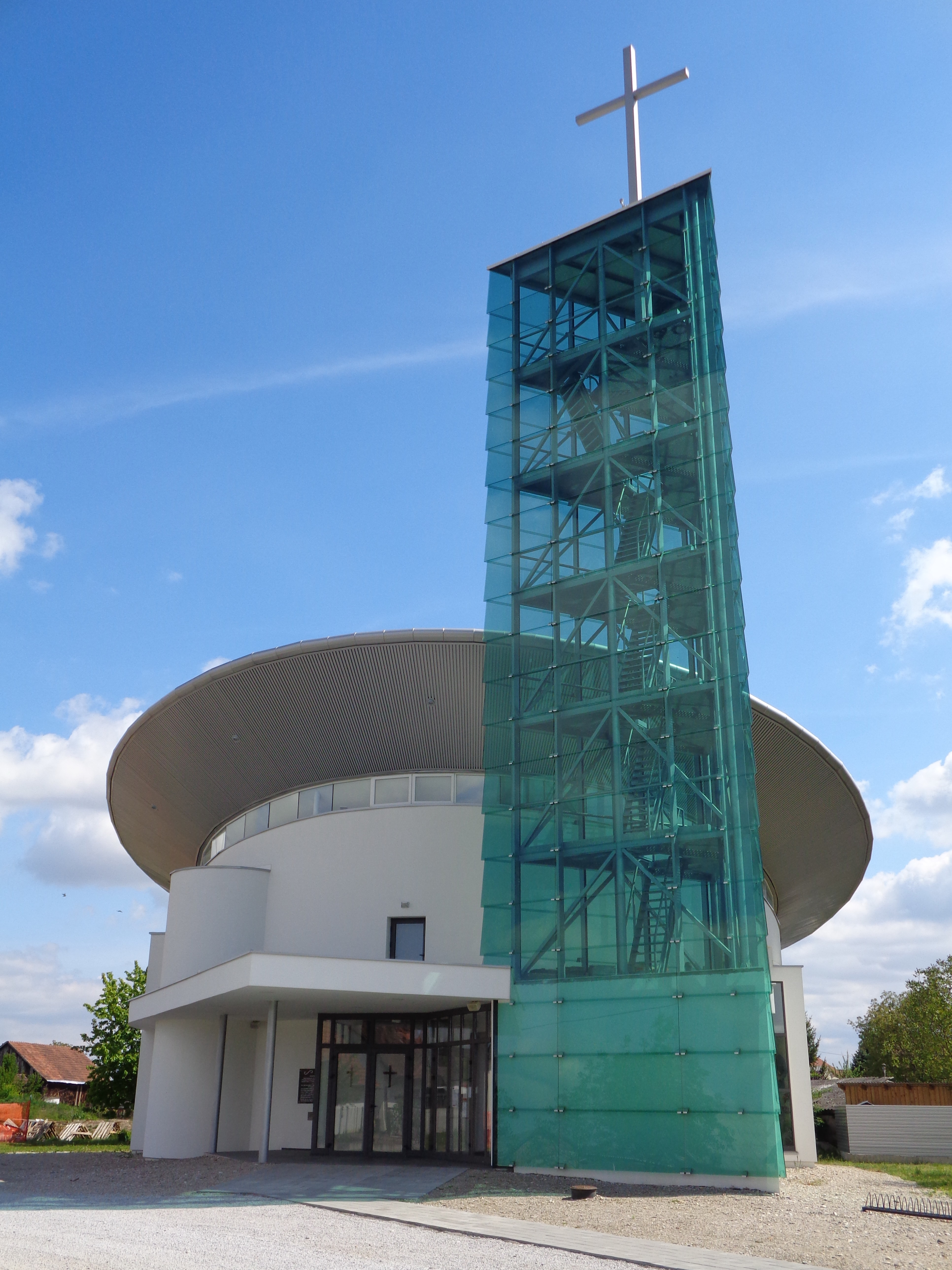
Church of Mary of Help

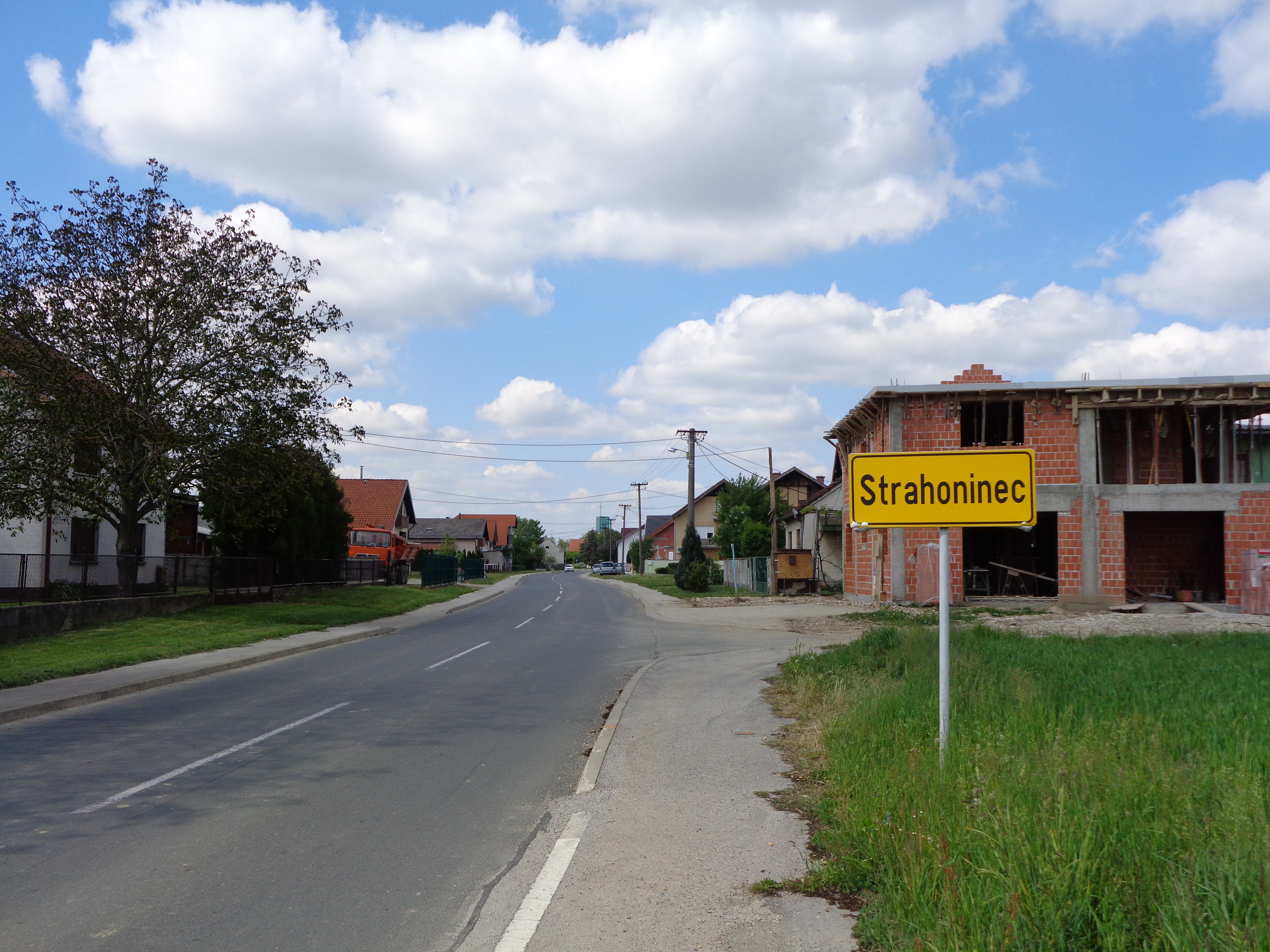
Village entrance

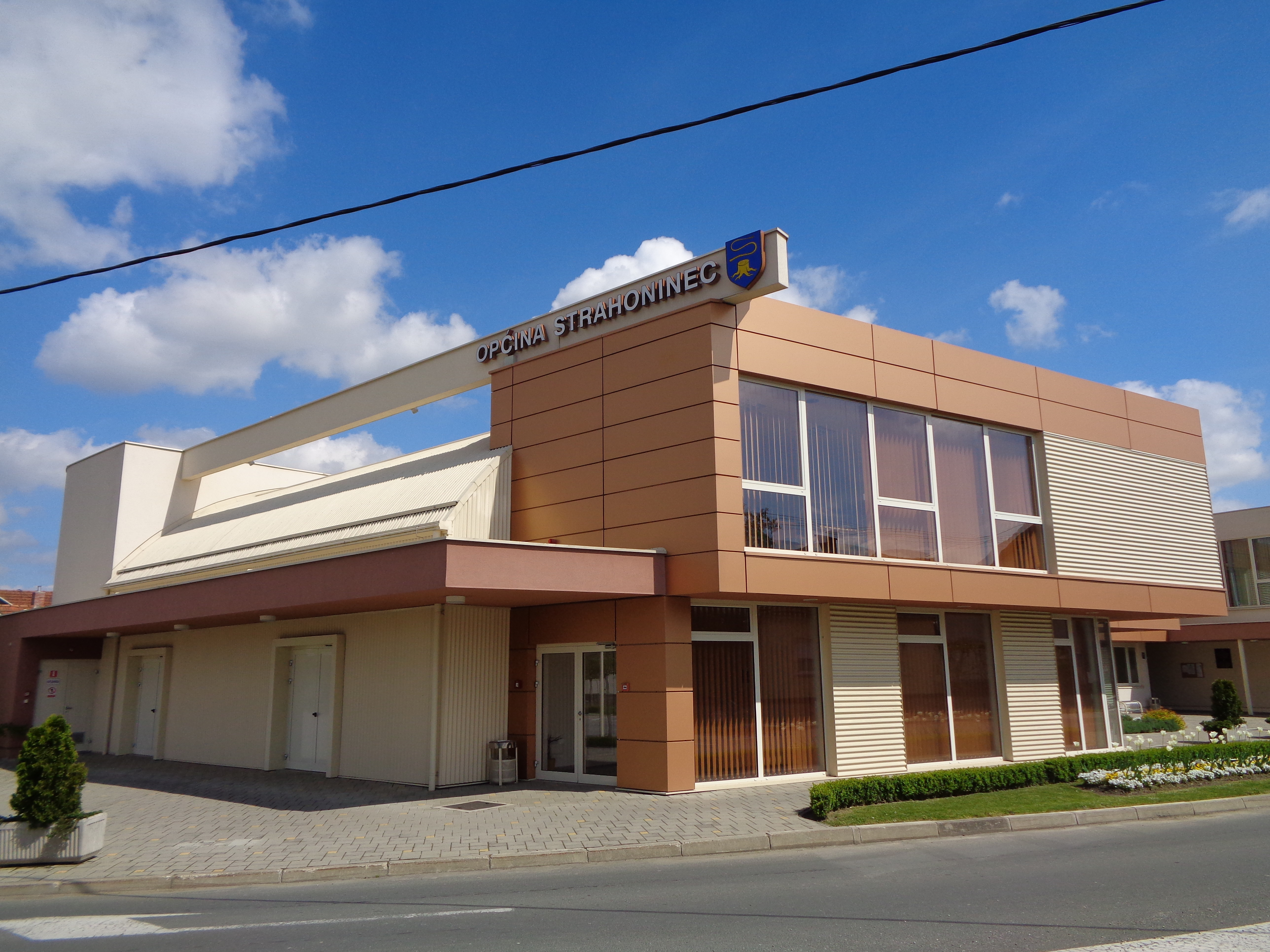
Municipal building
