= Maison Close =

TV series

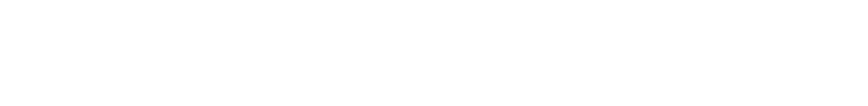
- Genre: Period drama
- Created by: Jacques Ouaniche
- Developed by: Mabrouk El Mechri
- Creative director: Paulo Routier
- Starring: Anne Charrier Valérie Karsenti Jemima West Catherine Hosmalin Clémence Bretécher Deborah Grall Blandine Bellavoir
- Composer: Gast Waltzing Alain Pewzner
- Country of origin: France
- Original language: French
- No. of series: 2
- No. of episodes: 16

Production
- Producer: Jacques Ouaniche Grégory Ouaniche Adrian Politowski Gilles Waterkeyn
- Production location: Lisbon (Portugal)
- Cinematography: Pierre-Yves Bastard
- Editor: Kako Kelber
- Running time: 52-55 minutes (season 1) 45-53 minutes (season 2)
- Production company: Noé Productions Canal+

Original release
- Network: Canal+
- Release: October 4, 2010 – February 25, 2013

Maison Close is a French television series which premiered on Canal+ on October 4, 2010. The series was developed by Mabrouk El Mechri and is based on a concept created by Jacques Ouaniche. It is a drama set in a nineteenth-century Parisian brothel.

On December 7, 2010, Canal + renewed Maison Close for a second season which premiered on February 4, 2013. But in May 2013, the series had been cancelled by Canal+ after the second season, following a decline in ratings.

== Premise ==
Paris, 1871. In Le Paradis, a luxury brothel, three women try to escape from their troublesome circumstances. Vera is 35 years old, the end of her career as a prostitute drawing nearer. She puts all her hopes on her main client, the only one rich enough to redeem her debt. Hortense is the madam of Le Paradis. She must hold on to her girls whilst dealing with an extortionist from the Parisian suburbs. Rose arrives in search of her mother, a former prostitute. She is trapped with a pimp and forcibly conscripted into Le Paradis.

== Cast and characters ==
=== Main ===
- Anne Charrier as Véra
- Valérie Karsenti as Hortense Gaillac.
- Jemima West as Rosalie "Rose" Tranier
- Catherine Hosmalin as Marguerite Fourchon
- Clémence Bretécher as Valentine
- Deborah Grall as Bertha
- Blandine Bellavoir as Angèle
- Nicolas Briançon as Pierre Gaillac (season 1)
- Michaël Cohen as Louis Mosca (season 2)

=== Recurring ===
- Dany Verissimo as Camélia
- Sébastien Libessart as Torcy

Season 1

- Dan Herzberg as Gaston Lupin
- Serge Dupuy as Brice Caboche
- Lannick Gautry as Edgar
- Arnaud Binard as Francis Arnoult
- Antoine Chappey as Charles Blondin
- Garlan Le Martelot as Edmond Blondin
- Juana Pereira da Silva as Louison "Louise"
- Olivier Claverie as senator Gaudissart
- Quentin Baillot as baron du Plessis
- Pierre Casadei as the general

Season 2

- Fatou N'Diaye as Pauline
- Martin Loizillon as Bak
- Lubna Gourion as Jeanne
- Michaël Abiteboul as Kertel
- Jean-Marie Frin as commissioner Angélus
- Aurélien Wiik as the doctor
- Susana Blazer as Zoe
- David Salles as Paul
- Elmano Sancho as Delvaux
- Sophie-Charlotte Husson as Joséphine
- Francis Seleck as Bayle
- Sylvain Rougerie as Lubeck
- Afonso Lagarto as Themier le Borgne

== Episodes ==
=== Season 1 (2010) ===
The first season premiered on Canal+ on October 4, 2010. The season finale aired on October 25, 2010.

- Épisode 1
- Épisode 2
- Épisode 3
- Épisode 4
- Épisode 5
- Épisode 6
- Épisode 7
- Épisode 8

=== Season 2 (2013) ===
The second season premiered on Canal+ on February 4, 2013. The season finale aired on February 25, 2013.

- Épisode 1
- Épisode 2
- Épisode 3
- Épisode 4
- Épisode 5
- Épisode 6
- Épisode 7
- Épisode 8

== Production and development ==
Jacques Ouaniche imagined the series in 2007, taking as a starting point a "trapped young girl forced to prostitute in a nineteenth century Parisian brothel".

Production of the first season began in October 2009 and ended in January 2010 in Lisbon, Portugal.

On December 7, 2010, Canal + renewed Maison Close for a second season to consist of 8 episodes. Production of the second season began in January 2012 and ended in May 2012 in Lisbon, Portugal.

In May 2013, the series had been cancelled by Canal+ after the second season, following a decline in ratings.

== Home media release ==
- The first season was released in France on DVD on October 26, 2010, and on Blu-ray on March 1, 2013. The second season was released on both DVD and Blu-ray on March 1, 2013. The complete serie was released on DVD and Blu-ray on October 9, 2013.
- The first season was released in United Kingdom on DVD and Blu-ray on September 3, 2012. The second season was released on DVD and Blu-ray on August 19, 2013.
- The first season was released in United States on DVD and Blu-ray on January 27, 2015. The second season was released on DVD and Blu-ray on June 16, 2015.

== Adaptations ==
On November 9, 2012, it was revealed that an English-language adaptation was in development and that HBO and Mark Wahlberg and Stephen Levinson's Leverage would develop the project. The remake should be identical to the original version except for the cast and the language. Although the project has not been canceled, HBO no longer communicates about it since the announcement.
