= Međimurje (region) =

Region in Croatia

Međimurje Hungarian: Muraköz
- Geographic region
- Etymology: Croatian: međimorje, lit. 'island'
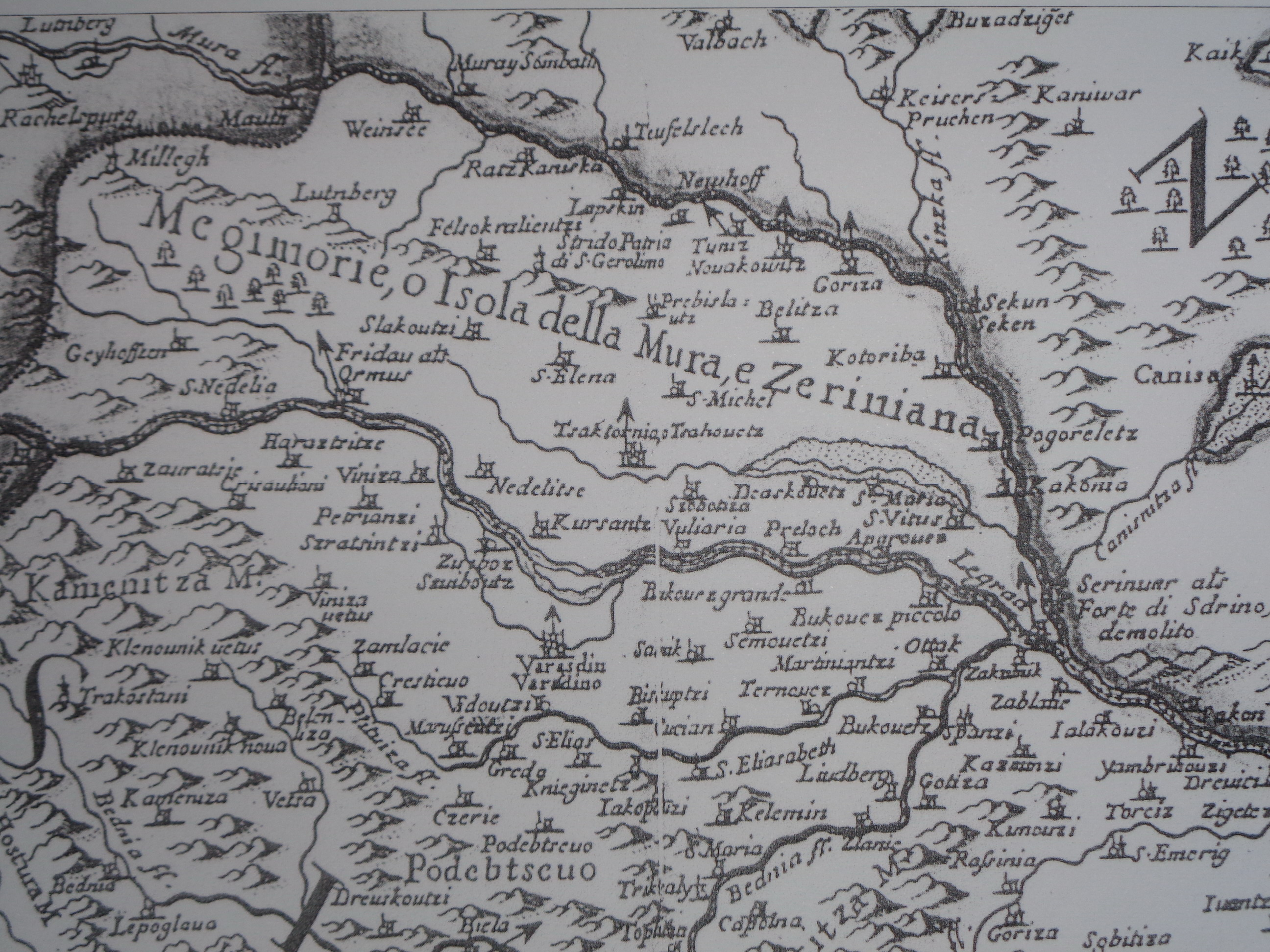
- Međimurje (here on an old map from 1690, with the Mura River as border to Hungary) is the northernmost part of Croatia
- Country: Croatia
- Traditional capital: Čakovec

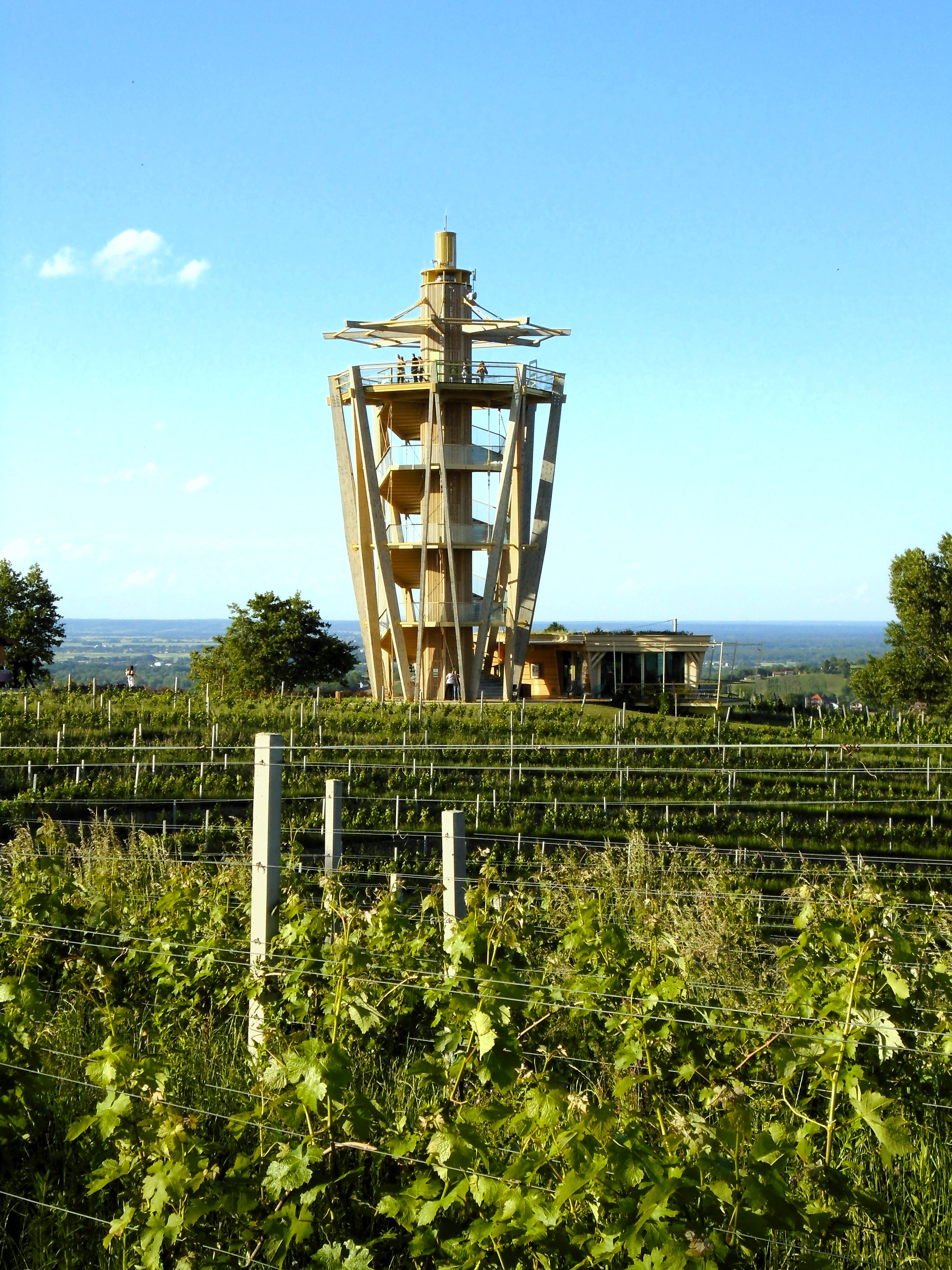
Upper Međimurje landscape

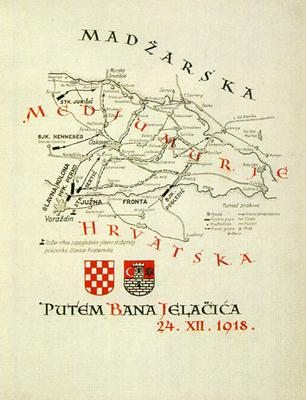
Map showing military campaign at the end of the First World War, during which Međimurje was liberated from Hungarian forces and incorporated into the newly formed State of Slovenes, Croats and Serbs

Međimurje (pronounced [medʑǐmuːrje]; Hungarian: Muraköz) is a small historical and geographical region in Northern Croatia comprising the area between the two large rivers, Mura and Drava, and roughly corresponding to the administrative division of Međimurje County.

== Overview ==
The region consists of the alluvial plain in its southeastern part (so called Dolnje Međimurje or 'Lower Međimurje') and the slopes of the Alpine foothills in its northwestern part (Gornje Međimurje – 'Upper Međimurje' – or sometimes Međimurske gorice, approx. 'the Međimurje Hills'). The highest geographical point is Mohokos at 344.4 metres (1,130 ft) above sea level. It forms part of a short hill range that extends for about 20 kilometres (12 mi) across the northwestern part of the region in northwest-southeast direction. While Upper Međimurje is covered with groves, meadows, vineyards and orchards, Lower Međimurje is largely used for tillage, which includes fields of cereals, maize, potato, as well as vegetable farming.

The region has been inhabited since the Neolithic and Bronze Age. From the 1st century it was under the control of the Roman Empire and part of the province of Pannonia. In the Early Middle Ages the Slavs settled the region, which later became part of the Duchy of Pannonian Croatia, then the Kingdom of Croatia and (from 1102) the Kingdom of Croatia in personal union with Hungary. Over the centuries it was possessed by many noble families such as the Lacković, Celjski, Ernušt, Zrinski, Althann or Feštetić.

According to the 1527 election in Cetin Međimurje fell under the rule of the Austrian Habsburgs and remained part of the Habsburg monarchy (later the Austrian Empire and Austria-Hungary) until the end of the First World War in 1918. From 1720 Međimurje was officially part of the Hungarian Zala County.

It was occupied in late December 1918, and proclaimed a part of the newly formed Kingdom of Serbs, Croats and Slovenes (later known as Yugoslavia) by a popular assembly held in the region's largest town Čakovec. This was confirmed in the Treaty of Trianon. Since 1991 the region has been part of the Republic of Croatia.

== Castles and manor houses ==
- Banfi Manor
- Čakovec Castle
- Feštetić Castle
- Lapšina Castle
- Tkalec Manor

== See also ==
- Regions of Croatia
- History of Croatia
- Geography of Croatia
- Hungarian Revolution of 1848
- Međimurje under Hungarian rule
- Međimurje horse
- Međimurska gibanica
- Sveta Jelena
