= Anne Charrier =

French actress

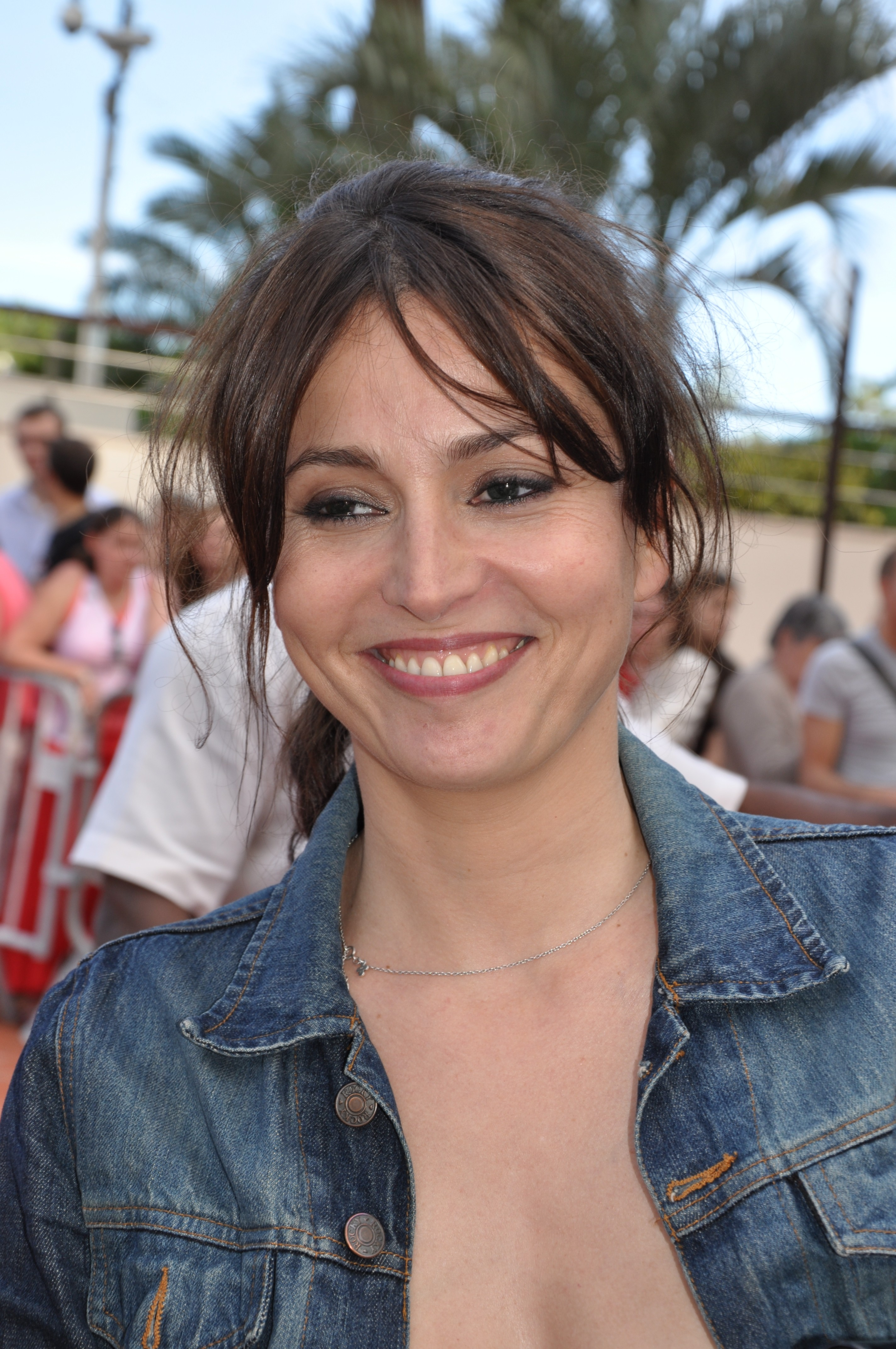
- Anne Charrier at the Monte Carlo Television Film Festival
- Born: 16 March 1974 (age 52); Ruffec, Charente, France
- Occupation: Actress
- Years active: 1999–present

Anne Charrier is a French actress, who is credited with 7 films and 22 TV productions between 2000 and 2009.

== Career ==
She is best known for her lead role in the film Paid, made in 2006, where she played a French call girl from Netherlands. The film was exhibited at the 22nd Braunschweig International Film Festival. Charrier made her film debut in this production though she has had over 20 TV credits.

== Theater ==
Year	Title	Author	Director	Notes
1999	Twelfth Night	William Shakespeare	L. Pacot-Grivel	
2002	The Liar	Pierre Corneille	Nicolas Briançon	Théâtre Hébertot
2005	Le Manège	Florian Zeller	Nicolas Briançon (2)	Petit Montparnasse
2006	Début de fin de soirée	Clément Michel	Clément Michel	Comédie de Paris
2011	Au moment de la nuit	Claude Prosper Jolyot de Crébillon	Nicolas Briançon (3)	Théâtre des Champs-Élysées
2011	Le Pain de Ménage	Jules Renard	Nicolas Briançon (4)	Théâtre des Champs-Élysées
2012	Volpone	Ben Jonson	Nicolas Briançon (5)	Théâtre de la Madeleine
2014	Chambre froide	Michele Lowe	Sally Micaleff	La Pépinière-Théâtre

== Filmography ==
Year	Title	Role	Director	Notes
2000	Éléanne K	Éléanne	Guillaume Moreels	Short
2000	Argent content	The Woman	Philippe Dussol	Short
2000	Drug Scenes		Guillaume Nicloux	TV series (1 episode)
2002	H	Jessica	Charles Nemes	TV series (1 episode)
2002	Âge sensible	Delphine Pagès	Gilles Bannier	TV series (1 episode)
2002	Avocats & associés	The Lawyer	Alexandre Pidoux	TV series (1 episode)
2003	Le prix de l'honneur	Sophie Larrieu	Gérard Marx	TV movie
2004	Paul Sauvage	Sam	Frédéric Tellier	TV movie
2004	Central nuit	The Receptionist	Franck Vestiel	TV series (1 episode)
2004	Avocats & associés	The Lawyer	Philippe Triboit	TV series (1 episode)
2005	Cortèges		Thomas Perrier	Short
2005	Prune Becker	Anne	Alexandre Pidoux (2)	TV series (1 episode)
2005–2006	La crim'	Lefèvre	François Luciani & Jean-Pierre Prévost	TV series (18 episodes)
2006	Paid	Paula	Laurence Lamers	
2006	Léa Parker	Ariane Straten	Jean-Pierre Prévost (2)	TV series (1 episode)
2006	David Nolande	The Young Girl	Nicolas Cuche	TV series (1 episode)
2007	Jalouse	Louise	Matthew Frost	Short film
2007	Joséphine, ange gardien	Estelle Duval	Sylvie Ayme	TV series (1 episode)
2008	The Last Deadly Mission	The Veterinarian	Olivier Marchal	
2008	Arrêt demandé		Thomas Perrier (2)	Short
2008	État de manque	Elsa	Claude d'Anna	TV movie
2008	Julie Lescaut	Coralie	Eric Summer	TV series (1 episode)
2008	Paris enquêtes criminelles	Catherine	Jean-Teddy Filippe	TV series (1 episode)
2008	Femmes de loi	Madame Gauthier	Hervé Renoh	TV series (1 episode)
2008	Les tricheurs	Monica Casagrande	Laurent Carcélès	TV series (1 episode)
2008	Duval et Moretti	Judge Clément	Dominique Guillo	TV series (1 episode)
2008	Scalp	Hélène	Jean-Marc Brondolo & Xavier Durringer	TV series (8 episodes)
2009	Une semaine sur deux (et la moitié des vacances scolaires)	Clara	Ivan Calbérac	
2009	Les corbeaux	Nathalie	Régis Musset	TV movie
2009	La vie est à nous	Carole	Luc Pagès	TV series (3 episodes)
2009	Ligne de feu	Laura Van Bommel	Marc Angelo	TV series (5 episodes)
2009–2010	R.I.S, police scientifique	Laura Manès	Eric Le Roux & Jean-Marc Thérin	TV series (2 episodes)
2009–2010	Mes amis, mes amours, mes emmerdes	Nathalie	Jérôme Navarro & Sylvie Ayme (2)	TV series (11 episodes)
2010–2013	Maison Close	Véra	Mabrouk El Mechri, ...	TV series (16 episodes)
2011	L'art de séduire	The Florist	Guy Mazarguil	
2011	R.I.F. (Recherches dans l'Intérêt des Familles)	Sandra Giuliani	Franck Mancuso	
2011	Fatou		Nathalie Marchak	Short
2011	Tout le monde descend	Nadège Blancourt	Renaud Bertrand	TV movie
2012	Mes héros	Stéphanie	Éric Besnard	
2012	La stratégie de la poussette	Lorraine	Clément Michel	
2012	Clash	Béatrice Diop	Pascal Lahmani	TV series (2 episodes)
2013	Le jour attendra	Sarah	Edgar Marie	
2013	Profilage	Alexandra Gilardi	Julien Despaux	TV series (1 episode)
2013	Fais pas ci, fais pas ça	Isabelle	Cathy Verney	TV series (1 episode)
2013	Chérif	Nathalie Plessard	Julien Zidi	TV series (1 episode)
2014–2017	Marjorie	Marjorie	Ivan Calbérac	TV series (5 episodes)
2015	On voulait tout casser	Hélène	Philippe Guillard	
2015	The Proposal	Emma	Sean Ellis	Short
2015	Chefs	Delphine	Arnaud Malherbe	TV series (6 episodes); Nominated - ACS Award for Best Actress
2016	Marseille	Valérie	Kad Merad	
2016	Crash test Aglaé		Éric Gravel	
2016	Je compte sur vous		Pascal Elbé	
2019	Persona non grata	Ella Montero	Roschdy Zem	
2020	L'aventure des Marguerite	Isabelle	Pierre Coré	
2020	Peur sur le lac	Manon Carrère		TV series (5 episodes)
2020	Parents d'élèves	Elise Canova		
2020	Mention particulière: Bienvenue dans l'âge adulte	Nathalie		TV movie
2020	Bullit & Riper	Juge Woodpecker		TV movie
2020–2021	3615 Monique	Monique Masnel		TV series (9 episodes)
2021	Gabriel Rose			Short
2021	Meurtres à...	Fiona		TV series (2 episodes)
2021	Le temps des secrets	Tante Rose		
2022	Syndrome E	Dr. Florence Bordier		TV series (6 episodes)
2022	L'astronaute	Eva Veredia		
2023	Crimes parfaits	Aurélie Lelievre		TV series (1 episode)
2023	Alex Hugo	Mathilde Laurent		TV series (1 episode)
2023–2024	The Walking Dead: Daryl Dixon	Marion Genet		TV series (9 episodes)
