= Valérie Karsenti =

French actress (born 1964)

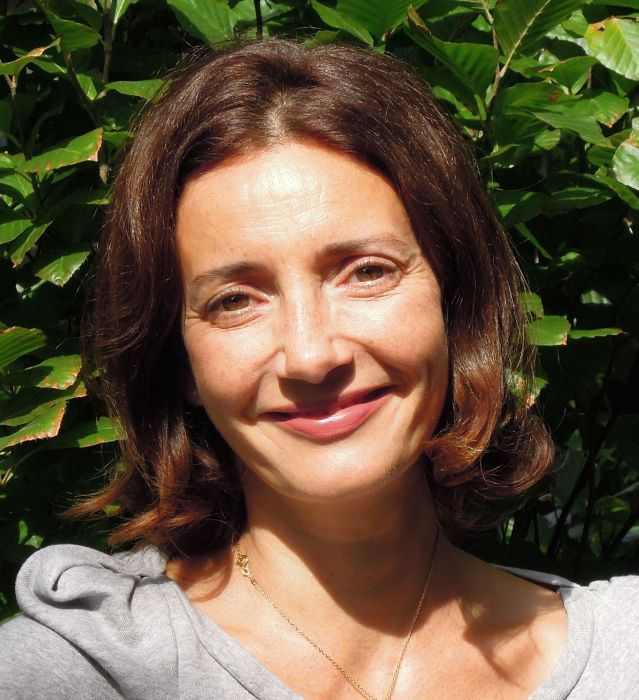
- Valérie Karsenti in 2011
- Born: 26 August 1964 (age 62); Pantin, Seine-Saint-Denis, France
- Occupations: Actress, comedian
- Years active: 1986–present

Valérie Karsenti (born 26 August 1964) is a French television, film, stage and voice actress. She is best known for her role as Liliane in the sitcom Scènes de ménages.

== Biography ==
Valérie Karsenti was born in Pantin in the department of Seine-Saint-Denis. She started at the age of 15 taking acting classes before joining the National School of Arts and Theater (ENSATT). She was still a student when Jean-Louis Thamin hired her to play in L'Étourdi with Roland Blanche and Jean-Pierre Lorit.

After leaving the ENSATT in 1988, she later portrayed important roles in television films such as Sniper and Édouard et ses filles. Since 1990, her career began to focus on theater, with her taking roles in Camus, Sartre et les autres, Colombe with Geneviève Page and Jean-Paul Roussillon, and Accalmies passagères, which received the Molière Award for best comedy show in 1997. She later played in Un fil à la patte and Un petit jeu sans conséquence, 5 Molière Awards and best private show in 2003.

At that time, she appeared again on television and cinema, especially with Bertrand Blier and Lisa Azuelos. She continued doing theatre work like Comme en 14, 3 Molière Awards and one for best public show in 2004, Le Prince travesti, Exit the King with Michel Bouquet, 2 Molière Awards and one for best private show in 2005, and Adultères with Pascale Arbillot.

Since 2009, she plays the role of Liliane in the sitcom Scènes de ménages, broadcast every day on channel M6. That year, she was chosen by Mabrouk El Mechri to play one of the leading roles in Maison Close, the new TV Series broadcast on Canal+.

== Personal life ==
She is mother of two boys, Léon (2002) and Chaïm (2006), born from her relationship with the actor François Feroleto.

== Filmography ==
Year	Title	Role	Director	Notes
1990	Sniper	Sandrine	Klaus Biedermann	TV movie
1990	Edouard et ses filles	Anne	Michel Lang	TV series (2 episodes)
1993	L'annexe	Caroline	Christophe Andrei	TV series (1 episode)
1993	La tête en l'air	Ludmilla 'Ludi' Guyot	Marlène Bertin	TV series (26 episodes)
1999	Occupé?	Hélène	Xavier Castano	Short
2000	Evamag	Charles's ex-wife	Agnès Boury	TV series (2 episodes)
2004	Maigret	Isabelle Fresco	Laurent Heynemann	TV series (1 episode)
2004	Fabien Cosma	Florence Lejeune	Christiane Lehérissey	TV series (1 episode)
2004	Le grand patron	Lisa	Christian Bonnet	TV series (1 episode)
2005	How Much Do You Love Me?	François's colleague	Bertrand Blier	
2005	Un prof en cuisine	Alice	Christiane Lehérissey	TV movie
2005	Confession d'un menteur	Fabienne	Didier Grousset	TV movie
2006	Le roi se meurt	Queen Marie	Roberto Maria Grassi	TV movie
2006	Spiral	Madeleine Surrier	Pascal Chaumeil	TV series (1 episode)
2006	Commissaire Cordier	Judge Fabre	Christophe Douchand	TV series (1 episode)
2008	Modern Love	Laure	Stéphane Kazandjian	
2008	LOL (Laughing Out Loud)	Laurence	Lisa Azuelos	
2008	Voici venir l'orage...	Moussia Gordon	Nina Companeez	TV mini-series
2009	The Hedgehog	Tibère's mother	Mona Achache	
2009	Tellement proches	Chantal	Éric Toledano and Olivier Nakache	
2009	P.J.	Valérie	Claire de la Rochefoucauld	TV series (2 episodes)
2009	Reporters	Judge Delassagne	Gilles Bannier & Jean-Marc Brondolo	TV series (7 episodes)
2009-2023	Scènes de ménages	Liliane	Francis Duquet, Karim Adda, ...	TV series (2714 episodes)
2010	Quand vient la peur...	Simone Cadet	Élisabeth Rappeneau	TV movie
2010-13	Maison Close	Hortense Gaillac	Mabrouk El Mechri	TV series (16 episodes)
2012	Je me suis fait tout petit	Claire	Cécilia Rouaud	
2012	Spin	Appoline Vremler	Frédéric Tellier	TV series (6 episodes)
2013	Cherif	Anne Delvos	Julien Zidi	TV series (1 episode)
2014	À toute épreuve	Christine Mollet	Antoine Blossier	
2014	Résistance	Maryka	Miguel Courtois & David Delrieux	TV mini-series
2014	Jusqu'au dernier	Karine Latour	François Velle	TV mini-series
2014-17	Marjorie	Claire	Ivan Calbérac & Mona Achache	TV series (4 episodes)
2015	Babysitting 2	Madame Massieye	Nicolas Benamou & Philippe Lacheau	
2016	Ma famille t'adore déjà	Corinne	Jérôme Commandeur & Alan Corno	
2016	Tuer un homme	Christine Belmonte	Isabelle Czajka	TV movie
2017	L'école buissonnière	Célestine	Nicolas Vanier	
2017	Pour La Galerie	Lise	Philippe Safir	Short
2018	Le poulain	Catherine Beressi	Mathieu Sapin	
2018	La Faute	Lisa Tedesco	Nils Tavernier	TV mini-series
2019	Un, Deux, Trois...	Christine	Lou Cheruy Zidi	Short
2019	Disparition inquiétante	The prosecutor	Arnauld Mercadier	TV mini-series
2020	La fugue	Jeanne	Xavier Durringer	TV movie
2020	Paris-Brest	Irène	Philippe Lioret	TV movie
2021-22	Rebecca	Sylvie Baumann	Didier Le Pêcheur	TV series (16 episodes)
2022	Champagne!	Céline	Nicolas Vanier	
2022	L'homme parfait	Florence	Xavier Durringer	
2022	Le Grand restaurant 4		Sarah Hafner & Pierre Palmade	TV movie
2022-23	Lycée Toulouse-Lautrec	Madame Lespic	Stéphanie Murat, Nicolas Cuche, ...	TV series (6 episodes)
2023	Les blagues de Toto 2	The mayor	Pascal Bourdiaux	

== Theater ==
Year	Title	Author	Director	Notes
1994	Modigliani	Dennis McIntyre	Yvan Garouel	
1996	Colombe	Jean Anouilh	Michel Fagadau	
1996	Camus, Sartre et «Les Autres»	Jean-François Prévand	Jean-François Prévand	
1997-98	Accalmies passagères	Xavier Daugreilh	Alain Sachs	Nominated - Molière Award for Best Female Newcomer
1999	Un fil à la patte	Georges Feydeau	Alain Sachs	
2002-04	Un petit jeu sans conséquence	Jean Dell & Gérald Sibleyras	Stéphane Hillel	Molière Award for Best Female Newcomer
2003-04	.. Comme en 14 !	Dany Laurent	Yves Pignot	
2004	Le Prince travesti	Pierre de Marivaux	Nicolas Briançon	
2004-05	Exit the King	Eugène Ionesco	Georges Werler	
2006-07	Adultères	Woody Allen	Benoît Lavigne	
2008	Le Vol de Kitty Hawk	Georges Dupuis	Yves Pignot	
2010-12	Grand Écart	Stephen Belber	Benoît Lavigne	
2014	Chambre froide	Michele Lowe	Sally Micaleff	
2015	Home	David Storey	Gérard Desarthe	
2018	Les Inséparables	Stéphan Archinard & François Prévôt-Leygonie	Ladislas Chollat	
2020	Le Système Ribadier	Georges Feydeau & Maurice Hennequin	Ladislas Chollat	
2023	La Femme n’existe plus	Céline Fuhrer & Jean-Luc Vincent	Céline Fuhrer & Jean-Luc Vincent	

== Dubbing ==
Year	Title	Role	Actress	Director	Notes
1994	The Swan Princess	Juliette	Michelle Nicastro	Richard Rich	
1994-95	Aladdin	Princess Jasmine	Linda Larkin	Various	TV series (59 episodes)
1994-96	Gargoyles	Angela & Hyena	Brigitte Bako & Cree Summer	Various	TV series (32 episodes)
1996	She's the One	Renee Fitzpatrick	Jennifer Aniston	Edward Burns	
1997	The Swan Princess: Escape from Castle Mountain	Juliette	Michelle Nicastro	Richard Rich	
1997-2001	Daria	Quinn Morgendorffer	Wendy Hoopes	Various	TV series (65 episodes)
1998	Mulan	Hua Mulan	Ming-Na Wen	Barry Cook & Tony Bancroft	
1998	The Swan Princess: The Mystery of the Enchanted Kingdom	Juliette	Michelle Nicastro	Richard Rich	
1999	A Map of the World	Theresa Collins	Julianne Moore	Scott Elliott	
2000	Joseph: King of Dreams	Asenath	Jodi Benson	Rob LaDuca & Robert C. Ramirez	
2000	Dr. Seuss' How the Grinch Stole Christmas	Betty Lou Who	Molly Shannon	Ron Howard	
2000	What Women Want	Annie	Sarah Paulson	Nancy Meyers	
2001	Just Visiting	Julia Malféte	Christina Applegate	Jean-Marie Poiré	
2001	Captain Corelli's Mandolin	Pelagia	Penélope Cruz	John Madden	
2004	Mulan II	Hua Mulan	Ming-Na Wen	Darrell Rooney & Lynne Southerland	
2004-08	Drawn Together	Toot Braunstein	Tara Strong	Various	TV series (39 episodes)
2005	Kingdom Hearts II	Hua Mulan	Ming-Na Wen	Tetsuya Nomura	Video game
2006	Bandidas	Sara Sandoval	Salma Hayek	Joachim Rønning & Espen Sandberg	
2007	Virgin Territory	Pampinea Anastargi	Mischa Barton	David Leland	
