= Bernd Monath =

German historian

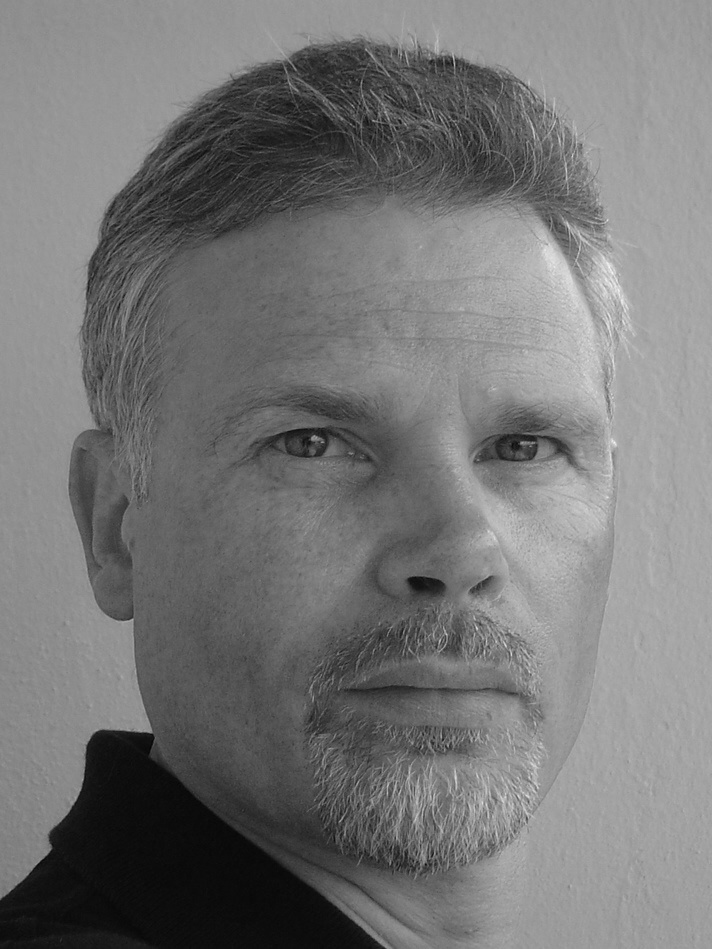
Bernd Monath (2005)

Bernd Monath (born 21 June 1960, in Bad Kreuznach, Germany) is a German historian, non-fiction author and novelist.

== Life ==
Monath completed his studies in the field of structural engineering as a graduate engineer and has been working in project management ever since. His childhood enthusiasm for sailing ships led to his first work "Versailles der Meere", published in 2016 by Frank & Timme, Berlin. The book describes the historical, art-historical and technical aspects of sailing ships in the 17th century baroque era at the court of Louis XIV. It is part of numerous academic libraries, such as the Princeton University Library, the Bibliothèque Interuniversitaire de la Sorbonne, or the Library of Congress.

His subsequent works can be classified as fiction. "Katzen sind auch nur Menschen" is a humorous, autobiographical novel about living with cats. "BORDIOC", "Der Felsengarten von Utgard" and "WANDERKRÖTEN" are thrillers and novels with scientific background.

Monath lives and works with his wife and son near Frankfurt am Main.

== Publications ==
- Versailles der Meere, Frank & Timme, Berlin 2016, ISBN 978-3-7329-0267-5
- Katzen sind auch nur Menschen, Principal-Verlag, Münster, 2017, ISBN 978-3-89969-215-0
- BORDIOC, Brighton Verlag, Framersheim, 2018, ISBN 978-3-95876-597-9
- Der Felsengarten von Utgard, Brighton Verlag, Framersheim, 2019, ISBN 978-3-95876-710-2
- WANDERKRÖTEN, Brighton Verlag, Framersheim, 2021, ISBN 978-3-95876-823-9
- MELANCHOLIA, Brighton Verlag, Framersheim, 2024, ISBN 978-3-95876-970-0
