= Hortense Monath =

American pianist (1905–1956)

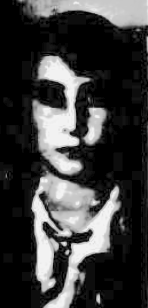
- Hortense Husserl, later Monath, from her 1924 application for a United States passport
- Born: Hortense Husserl; January 16, 1905; Newark, New Jersey, U.S.
- Died: May 21, 1956 (aged 51); New York City, U.S.
- Occupations: Pianist, arts administrator

Hortense Husserl Monath (January 16, 1905 – May 21, 1956) was an American concert pianist and program director of New Friends of Music, a concert series that ran in New York City from 1936 to 1953.

== Early life and education ==
Hortense Husserl was born in Newark, New Jersey, the daughter of Siegfried Husserl and Clara Gotthelf Husserl. Her mother was an American music teacher and pianist trained under Leschetizky, and her father was a physician from Austria. She studied piano with her mother, Ernest Hutcheson and Artur Schnabel.

== Career ==
Husserl made her professional debut in Hamburg. "Miss Husserl is without doubt the most promising young pianist heard so far this season," said a reviewer in the Brooklyn Daily Eagle, after her New York debut at Town Hall in 1930. "She brings to her instrument a highly cultivated technique, marked individuality and a truly remarkable innate rhythmic sense". She was a soloist who played with the Boston Symphony Orchestra, the NBC Symphony Orchestra, and the New York Philharmonic. She made several recordings, and performed on radio programs.

Though she was based in the New York area, Monath toured in the United States. She performed in Iowa and California in 1936, in Missouri in 1939 and 1943, and in Texas in 1940. In 1938 she was soloist with the Philadelphia Orchestra under Eugene Ormandy, in a concert marking the 20th anniversary of the end of World War I.

Monath was a co-founder and program director of New Friends of Music, a subscription chamber music concert series that ran for sixteen seasons, from 1936 to 1953. The unconventional series was based at Town Hall, and scheduled for Sunday evenings, 5:30 pm to 7:00 pm. Monath instructed that audiences should not applaud, and there were no intermissions and no encores in the program; the names of musicians and the works to be performed were not announced in advance. The concerts were broadcast, and sometimes recorded.

Monath was considered an important early proponent of Arnold Schoenberg, after playing his works at a recital in the early 1930s, inviting him to conduct his own works for the New Friends of Music series in 1940, and sponsoring the world premiere of his Second Chamber Symphony. She also debuted works by Schoenberg's student, Alban Berg. Monath opined on musical topics, including a strong distaste for musical prodigies, declaring them "a menace to musical education, a menace to proper music appreciation, and a menace mostly to their own futures as musicians and human beings". She was described as a stylish beauty in some publicity, with her beauty regimen, hairstyles, and fashion preferences detailed in newspaper profiles.

== Personal life and legacy ==
She married and divorced twice. Her first husband was Paul E. Monath; they married in 1926 and had a son, Peter, born in Vienna in 1927; they divorced in 1934. In 1937, Mayor Fiorello La Guardia officiated when she married her second husband, businessman Ira A. Hirschmann. They divorced in 1952. Monath died in 1956, at the age of 52. Pianist Seymour Bernstein, a student of her mother's, described Monath's final years as complicated by mental illness and financial struggles. Some of the New Friends of Music papers are in the Ira Arthur Hirschmann collection at the New York Public Library.

In the novel Fifty-Seventh Street (1971), by Joseph Machlis, the pianist character "Judith Conrad" is partly based on Monath in her later years.
