= Strigova =

Strigova may refer to:

- Štrigova, a village and municipality in Croatia
- Strigova, Bosnia and Herzegovina, a village near Dubica
- Strigova (river), a right tributary of the Una in Bosnia
