= Robadje =

- Village
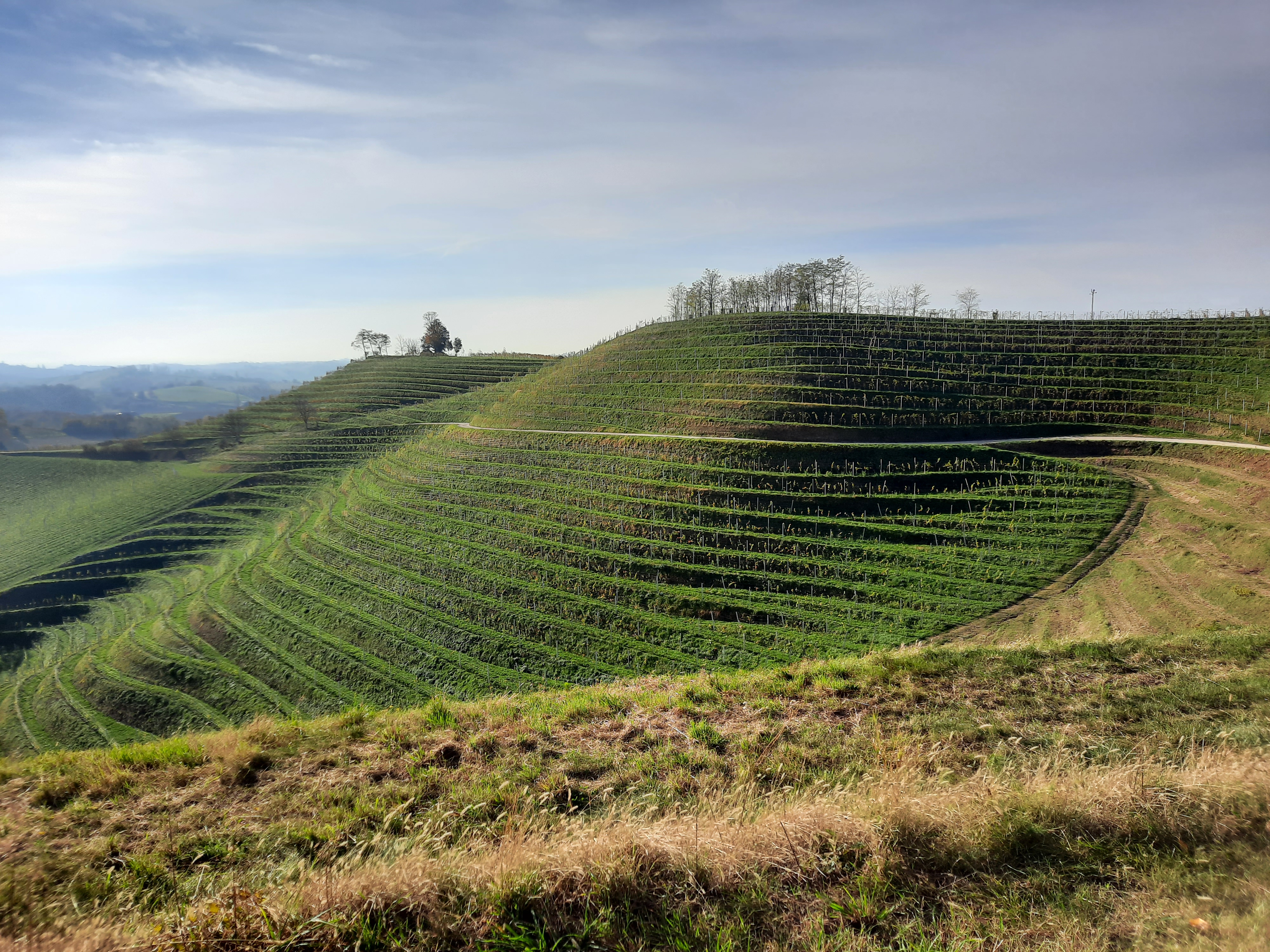
- Mađerkin breg

- Location within Croatia
- Coordinates: 46°29′23″N 16°15′04″E
- Country: Croatia
- County: Međimurje County
- Municipality: Štrigova

Area
  - Total: 4.9 km^{2} (1.9 sq mi)

Population (2021)
  - Total: 126
  - Density: 26/km^{2} (67/sq mi)
- Time zone: UTC+1 (CET)
  - Summer (DST): UTC+2 (CEST)
- Postal code: 40312 Štrigova

Robadje is a village in northern Croatia, part of the Štrigova municipality within Međimurje County. The village is located at the border with Slovenia.

== History ==
An urbarium from year 1672 mentions a vineyard on Strmec hill (Note: Strmec is a hill in Robadje) (Vinea in monte Stermecz). The vineyard was in possession of Zrinski noble family.

Tkalec Manor, most notable building in village, was built in 18th century by Paulines from Štrigova. Manor is located on Kalec hill and is surrounded by vineyards.

== Geography ==
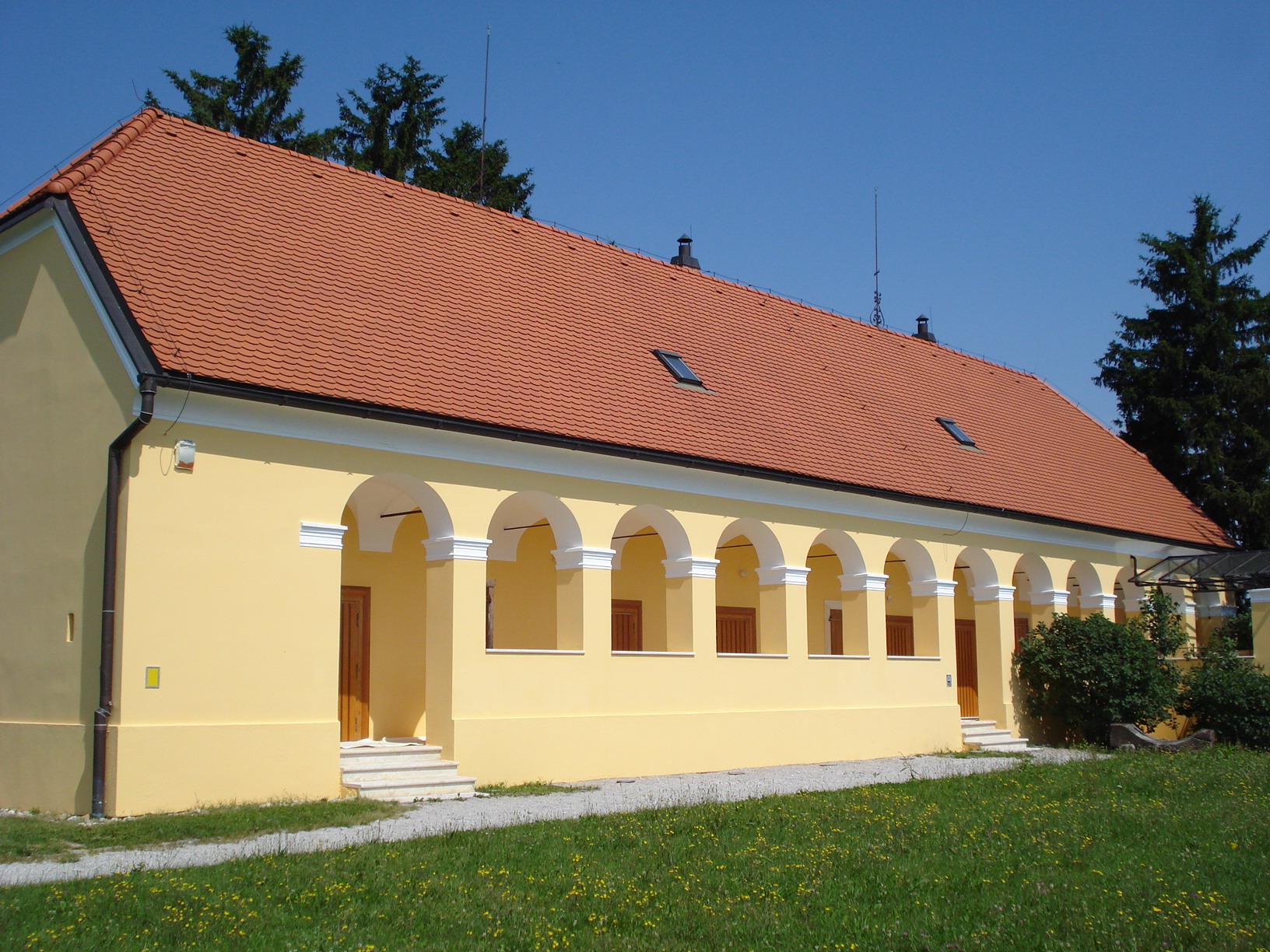
Tkalec Manor

Robadje is located in part of Međimurje called Gornje Međimurje. Robadje is about 23 kilometres northwest from Čakovec, and some 110 kilometres north of Zagreb.

Landscape of Robadje consist of low hills called Međimurske gorice, covered with vineyards, orchards and woodlands. Mađerkin breg, popular viewpoint, is located in Robadje. Robadje had a population of 159 in 2011 census. Robadje is experiencing population decline since the 1980s.

Historical population

Year	Pop.	±%
1921	466	—
1931	548	+17.6%
1948	450	−17.9%
1953	458	+1.8%
1961	399	−12.9%

Year	Pop.	±%
1971	412	+3.3%
1981	268	−35.0%
1991	237	−11.6%
2001	187	−21.1%
2011	159	−15.0%

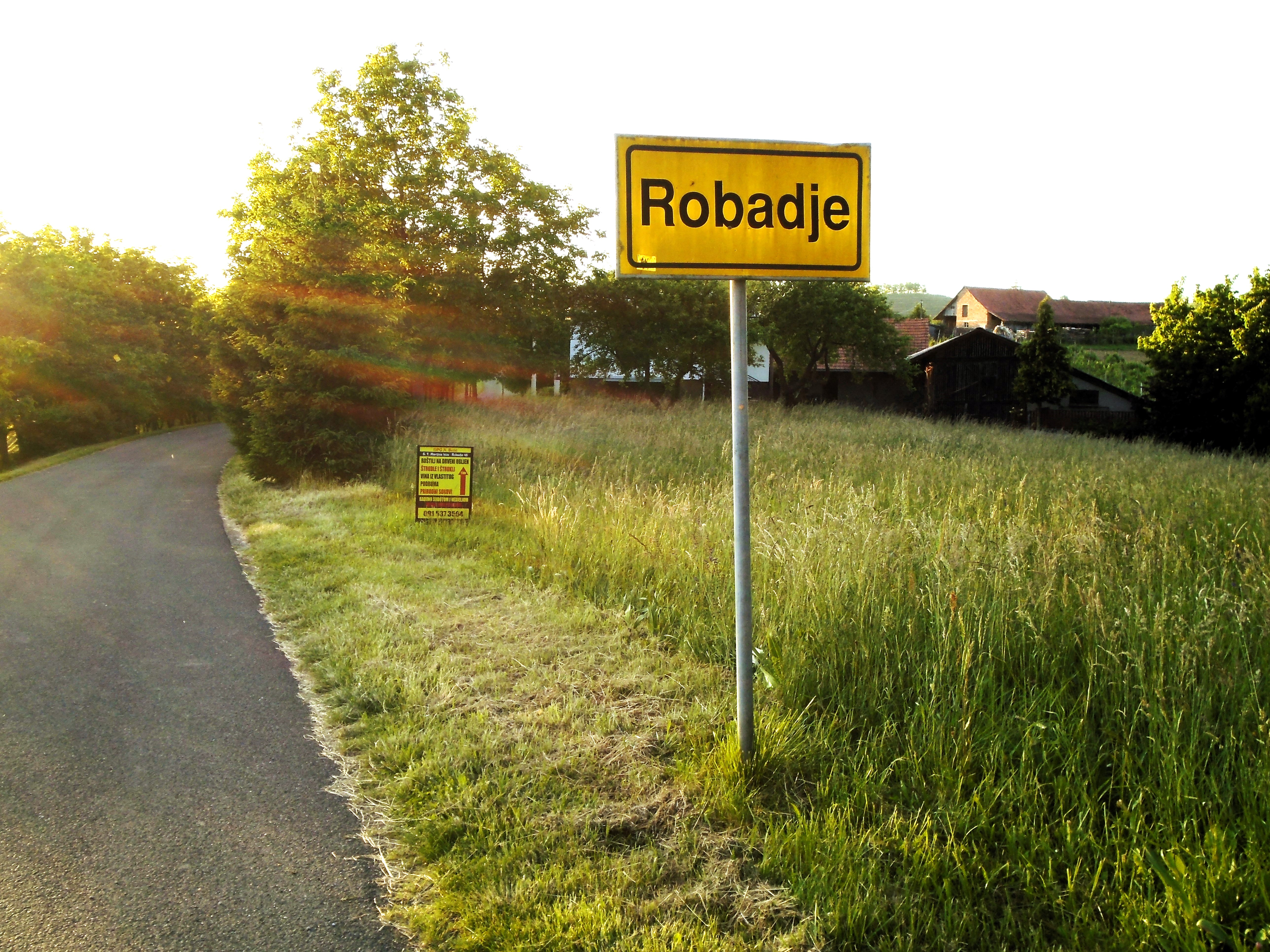
Village entrance
