= Jalšovec =

- Village
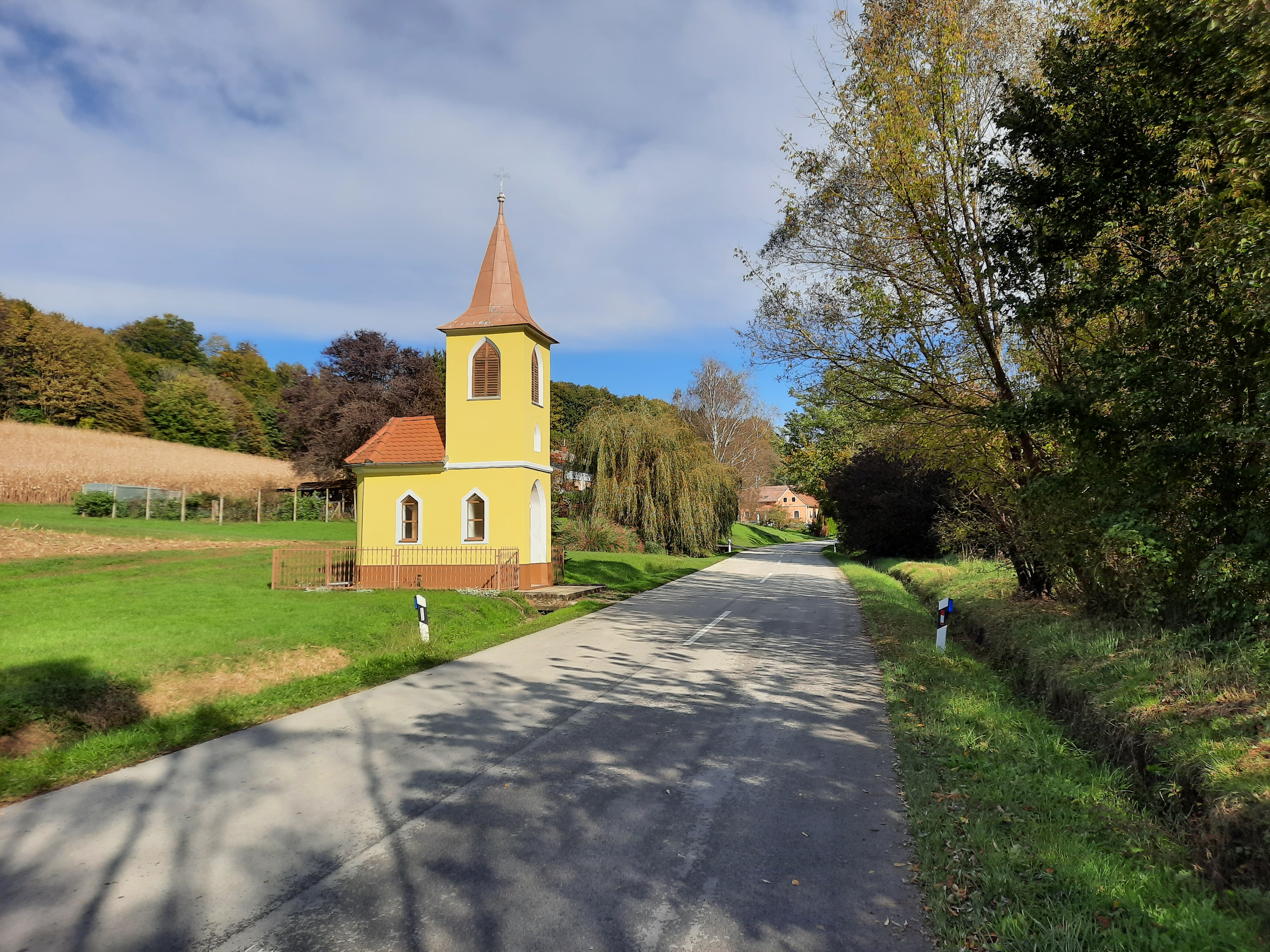
- Chapel in Jalšovec

- Location within Croatia
- Coordinates: 46°30′33″N 16°18′43″E
- Country: Croatia
- County: Međimurje County
- Municipality: Štrigova

Area
  - Total: 2.3 km^{2} (0.89 sq mi)

Population (2021)
  - Total: 111
  - Density: 48/km^{2} (120/sq mi)
- Time zone: UTC+1 (CET)
  - Summer (DST): UTC+2 (CEST)
- Postal code: 40312 Štrigova

Jalšovec is a village in northern Croatia, part of the Štrigova municipality within Međimurje County. Part of the village is on Croatia's border with Slovenia.

== History ==
Jalšovec was mentioned in the Urbarium from the second half of the 17th century as Villa Jalsowecz. In the urbarium Jalšovec is recorded as possession of Count Petar Zrinski.

The Roman Catholic Chapel in the village was built at the turn of the 19th century.

== Geography ==
Jalšovec is located in valley between hills of Gornje Međimurje. River Mura enters Croatia from Slovenia, in the northernmost part of settlement. There is a border crossing with Slovenia in Jalšovec called Bukovje. Although, is located in Jalšovec, border crossing is named after the hamlet of Bukovje, which belongs to the neighboring village of Čestijanec.

Jalšovec had a population of 144 in 2011 census. Jalšovec is experiencing population decline since the 1980s.

Historical population

Year	Pop.	±%
1921	235	—
1931	234	−0.4%
1948	241	+3.0%
1953	230	−4.6%
1961	207	−10.0%

Year	Pop.	±%
1971	241	+16.4%
1981	202	−16.2%
1991	200	−1.0%
2001	176	−12.0%
2011	144	−18.2%
