= Železna Gora =

- Village
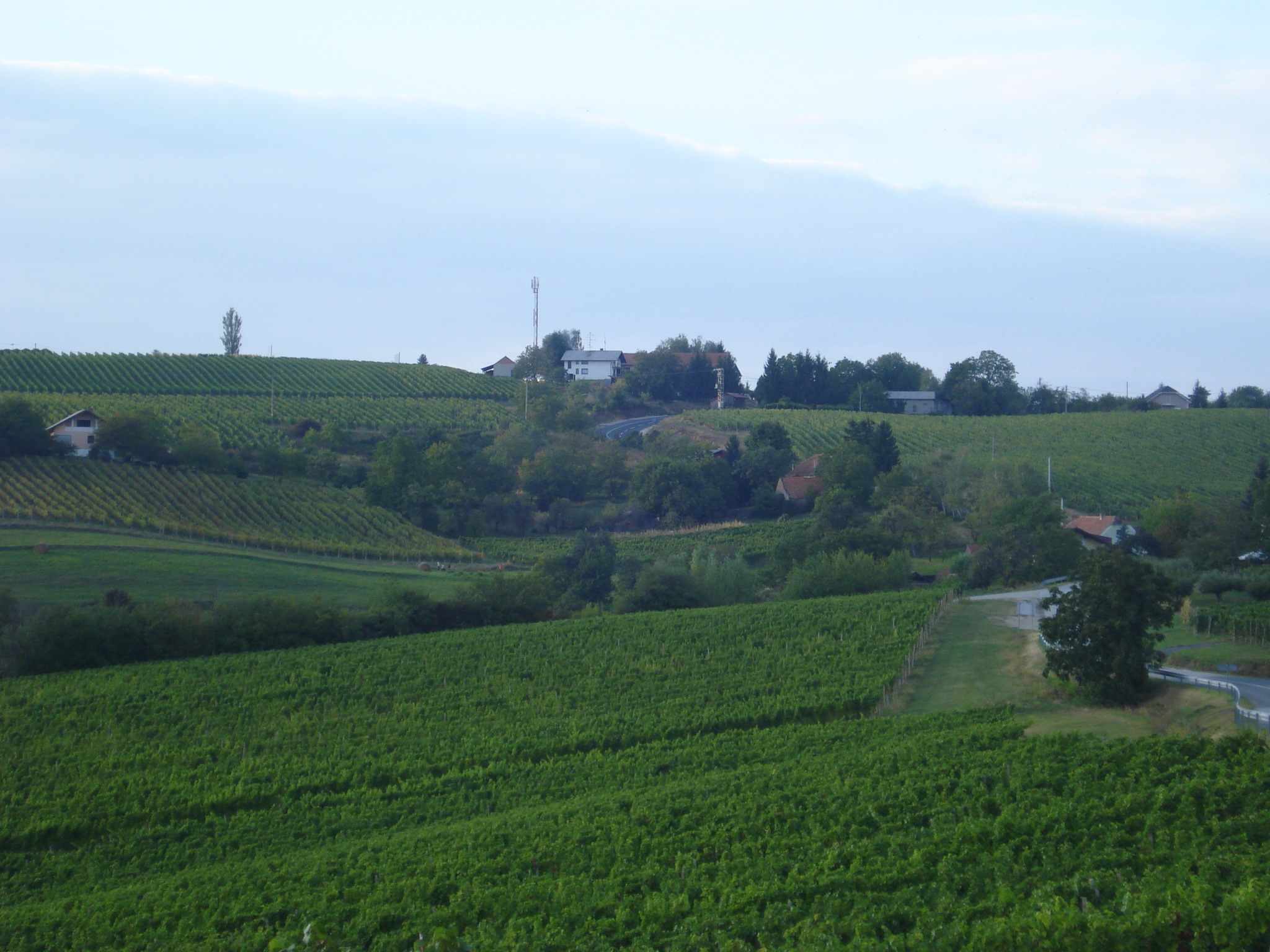

- Location within Croatia
- Coordinates: 46°28′53″N 16°18′31″E
- Country: Croatia
- County: Međimurje County
- Municipality: Štrigova

Area
  - Total: 5.7 km^{2} (2.2 sq mi)

Population (2021)
  - Total: 379
  - Density: 66/km^{2} (170/sq mi)
- Time zone: UTC+1 (CET)
  - Summer (DST): UTC+2 (CEST)
- Postal code: 40312 Štrigova

Železna Gora is a village in northern Croatia, part of the Štrigova municipality within Međimurje County.

== History ==
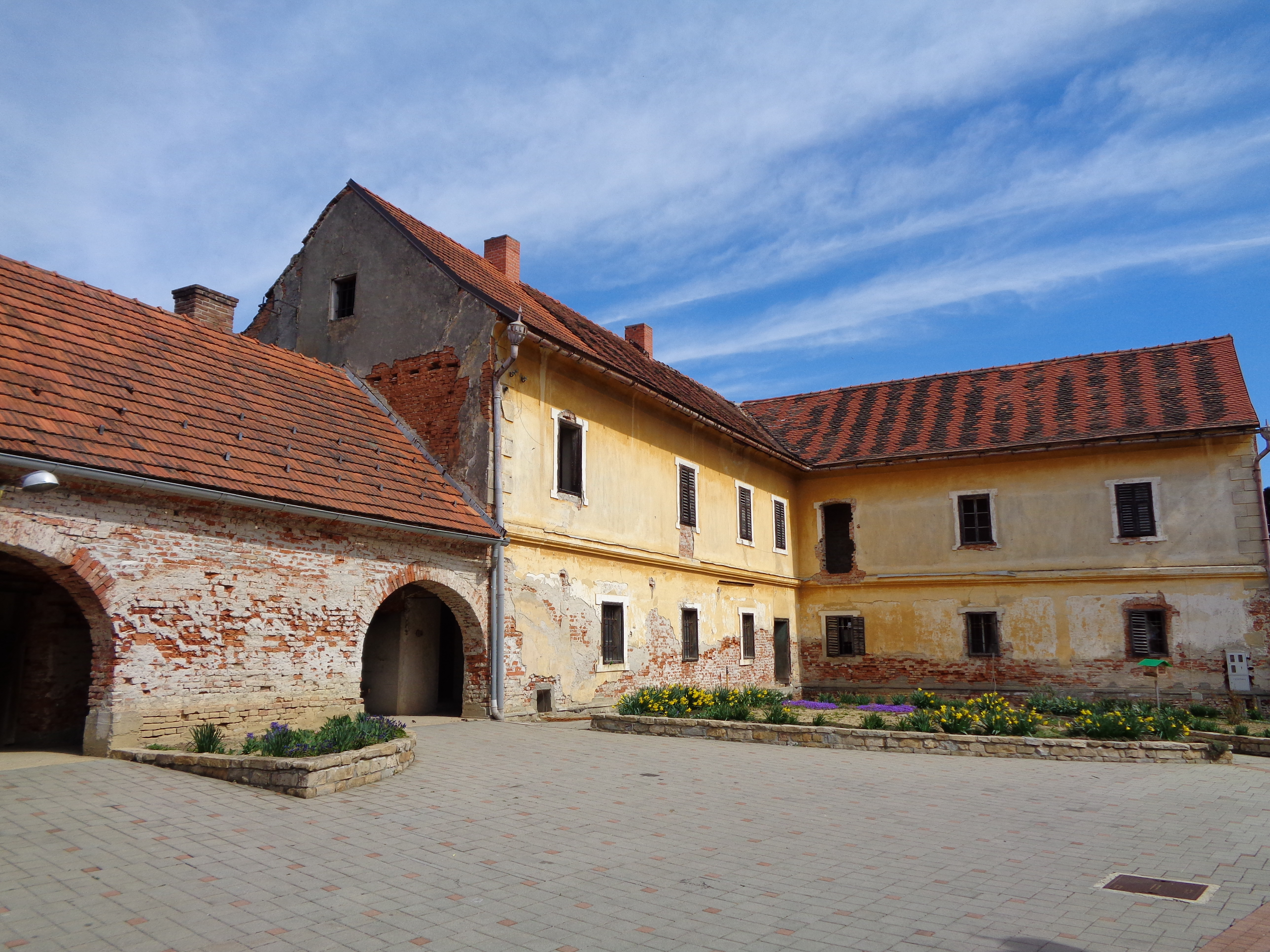
Terbotz Manor

Oldest archaeological finds in Železna Gora are from Roman period. Burial mounds and fragments of pottery were found in the hamlet of Trnovčak. Fragments of the Roman roads were found at the same locality.

Hamlet of Lohovec (Lohowecz) is first settlement mentioned in today's Železna Gora. Settlement is mentioned in the 15th century.

Terbotz Manor, most notable building in village, was built in the 19th century by members of noble family Zichy-Terbotz. Manor is located on prominent position surrounded by vineyards.

== Geography ==
Železna Gora is located in part of Međimurje called Gornje Međimurje. Settlement is about 16 kilometres northwest from Čakovec, and some 110 kilometres north of Zagreb.

Landscape of Železna Gora consist of low hills called Međimurske gorice, covered with vineyards, orchards and woodlands. Village is located on road that connects county seat Čakovec with town of Ljutomer in Slovenia. Železna Gora had a population of 465 in 2011 census. Železna Gora is experiencing population decline.

Historical population

| Year | Pop. | ±% |
|---|---|---|
| 1921 | 655 | — |
| 1931 | 613 | −6.4% |
| 1948 | 809 | +32.0% |
| 1953 | 805 | −0.5% |
| 1961 | 668 | −17.0% |

| Year | Pop. | ±% |
|---|---|---|
| 1971 | 612 | −8.4% |
| 1981 | 546 | −10.8% |
| 1991 | 493 | −9.7% |
| 2001 | 501 | +1.6% |
| 2011 | 465 | −7.2% |
