= Grabrovnik =

- Village
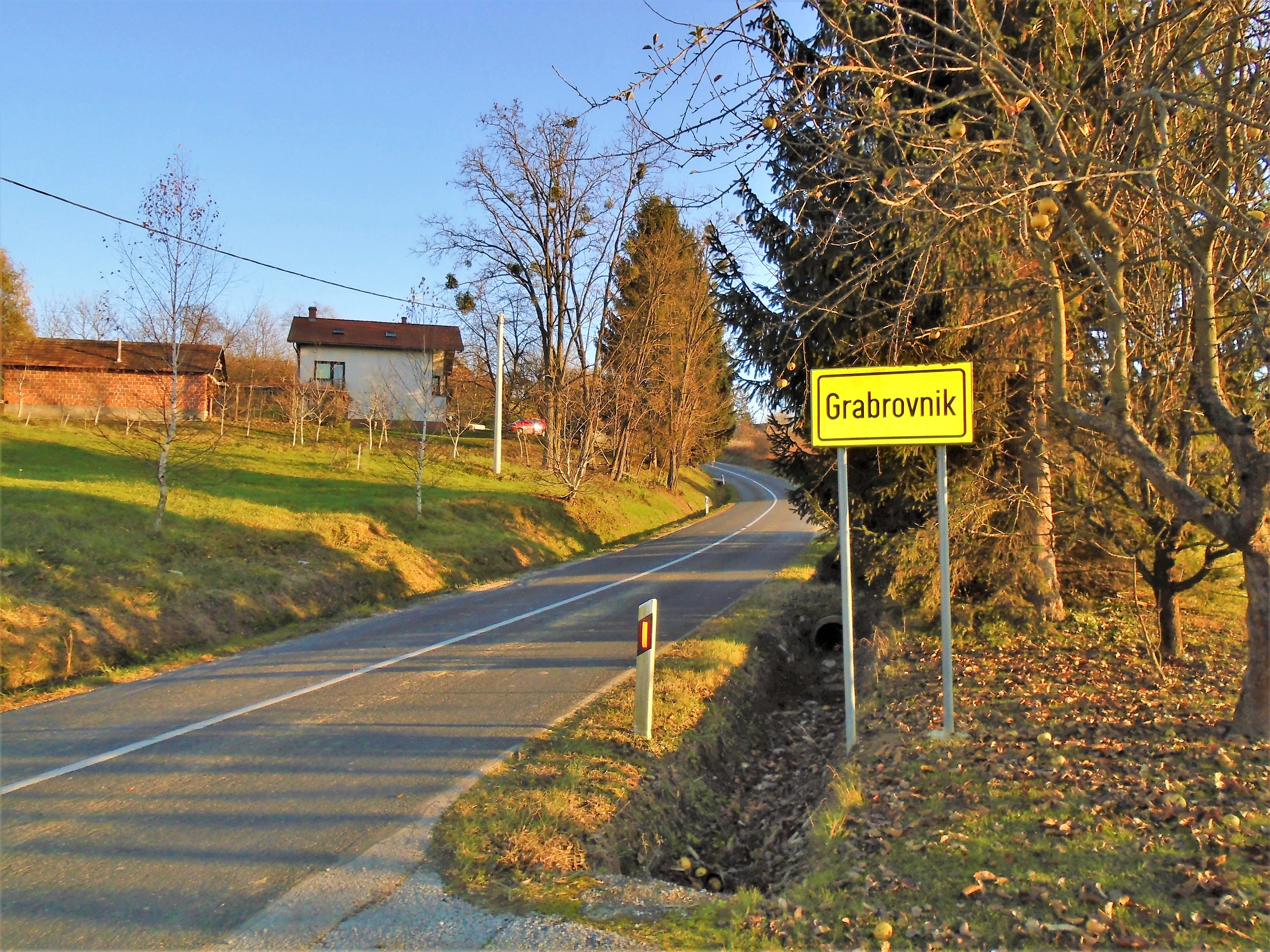
- village entrance

- Location within Croatia
- Coordinates: 46°29′17″N 16°18′09″E
- Country: Croatia
- County: Međimurje County
- Municipality: Štrigova

Area
  - Total: 5.1 km^{2} (2.0 sq mi)

Population (2021)
  - Total: 240
  - Density: 47/km^{2} (120/sq mi)
- Time zone: UTC+1 (CET)
  - Summer (DST): UTC+2 (CEST)
- Postal code: 40312 Štrigova

Grabrovnik is a village in northern Croatia, part of the Štrigova municipality within Međimurje County.

== History ==
An urbarium from year 1672 mentions a vineyard on Ciganjščak hill (Note: Čiganjščak is a hamlet and hill in Grabrovnik) (Vinea Cziganschyak). The vineyard was in possession of Zrinski noble family.

== Geography ==
Grabrovnik is located in part of Međimurje called Gornje Međimurje. Settlement is about 17 kilometres northwest from Čakovec, and some 110 kilometres north of Zagreb.

Landscape of Grabrovnik consist of low hills called Međimurske gorice, covered with vineyards, orchards, and woodlands. Village is located on road that connects county seat Čakovec with town of Ljutomer in Slovenia.

Grabrovnik had a population of 274 in 2011 census. Grabrovnik is experiencing population decline since 1950s.

Historical population

Year	Pop.	±%
1921	667	—
1931	767	+15.0%
1948	818	+6.6%
1953	800	−2.2%
1961	684	−14.5%

Year	Pop.	±%
1971	634	−7.3%
1981	556	−12.3%
1991	411	−26.1%
2001	390	−5.1%
2011	274	−29.7%
