= Banfi Manor =

House in Međimurje County, Croatia

Coordinates: 46°30′03″N 16°16′28″E

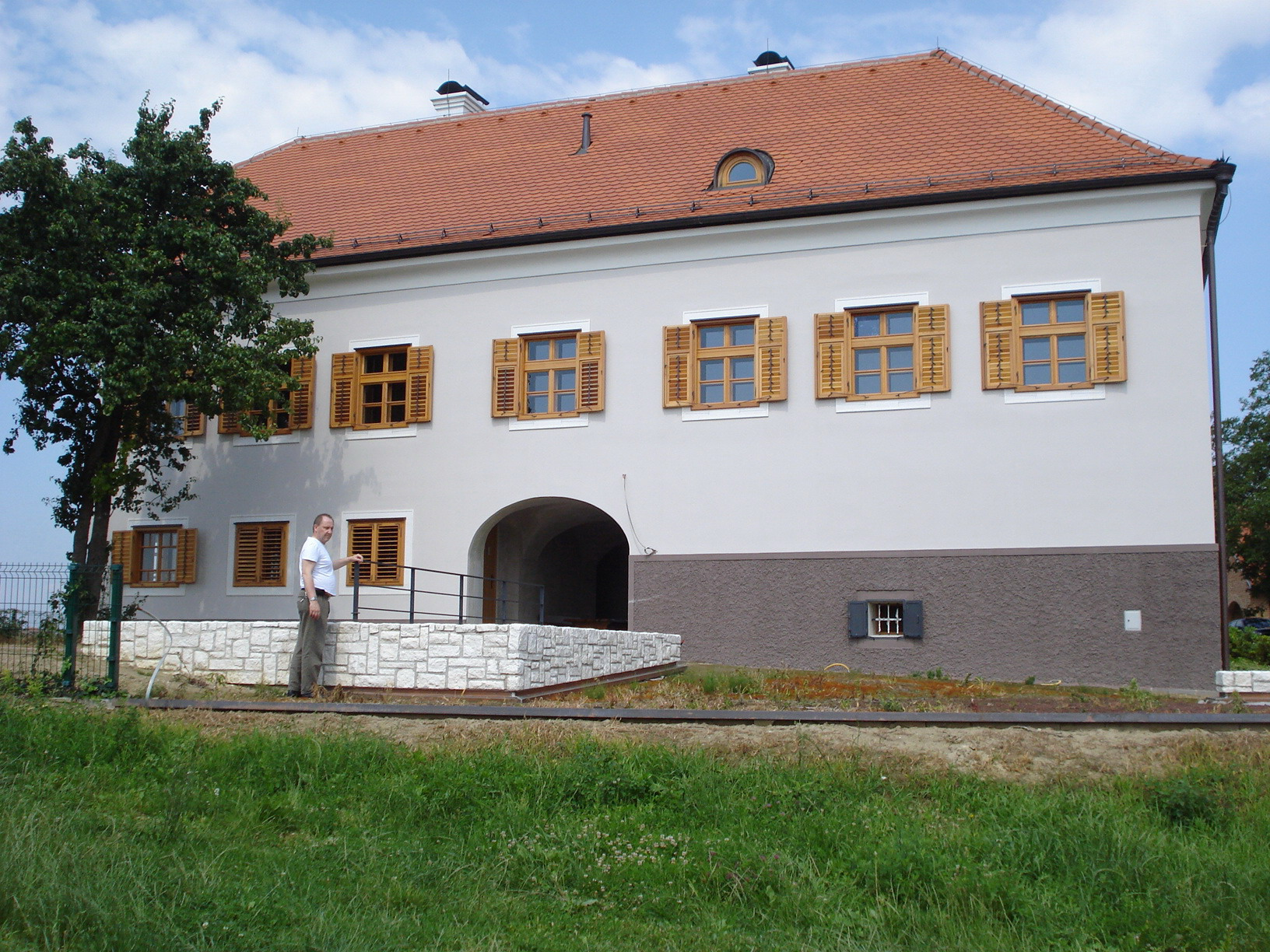
Banfi manor – south view

Banfi Manor (Croatian: Dvorac Banfi or Kurija Banfi; Hungarian: Bánffy-kastély) is an old building structure situated on a hill in the village of Banfi, next to the municipality seat of Štrigova in Međimurje county, northern Croatia.

Manor was built in 18th century on the ruins of castle Banffy. Older castle was built by a members of noble family Bánffy de Alsólendva. Castle was probably built in the 14th century (1373).

The manor is a one-storey building, designed in L-shaped ground plan, with the quite simple outside frontage of rhythmically aligned windows. There is an arcade entrance beneath the west wing of the manor. Over the past few years, Banfi has been undergoing a thorough renovation.

During many centuries, the manor was owned by several noble families like Banffy, Feštetić and Franetović. Today it is owned by Žižek, an entrepreneurial family from the Međimurje county.

== See also ==
- List of castles in Croatia

== Gallery ==
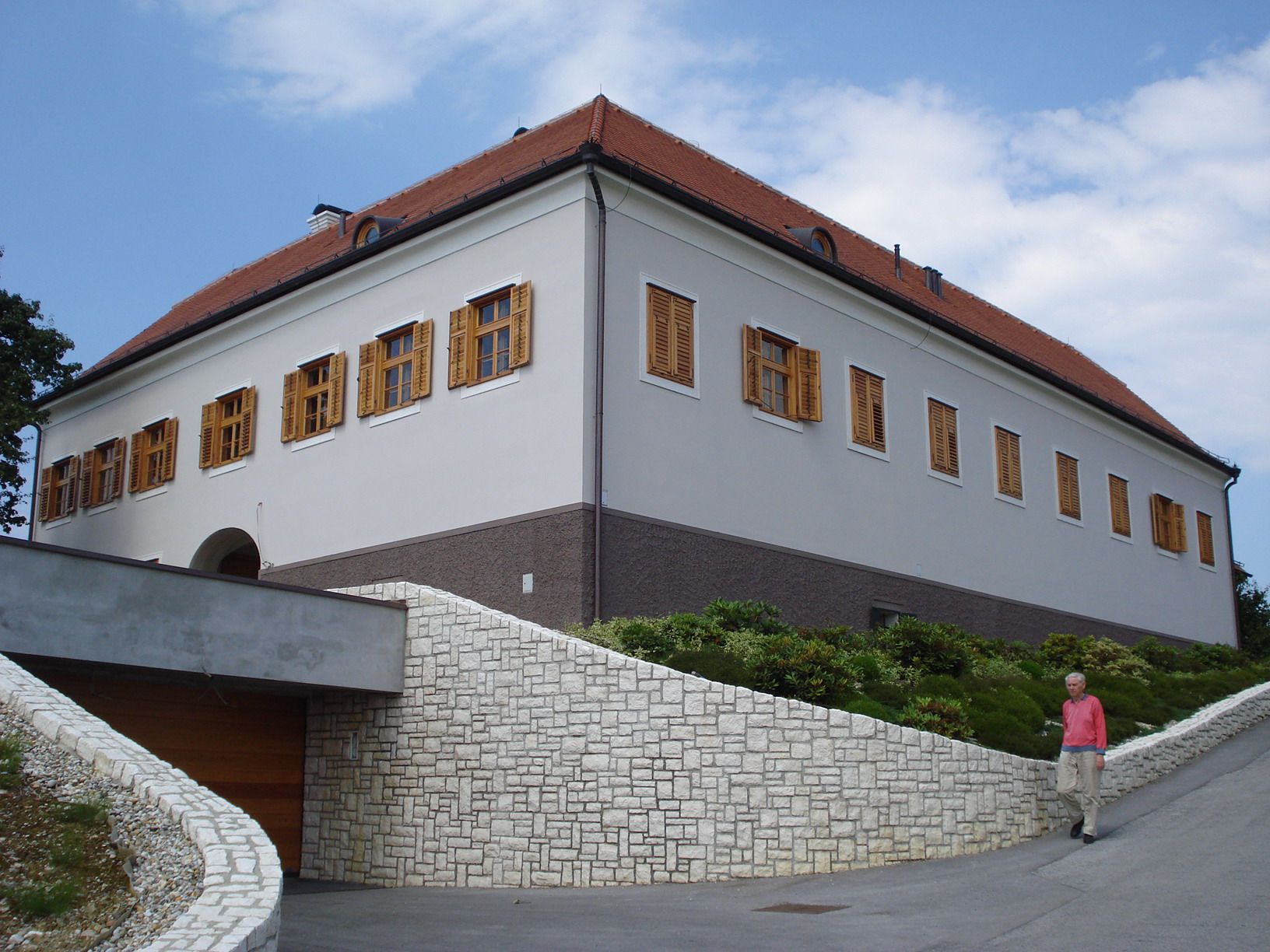
Southeast view of the manor

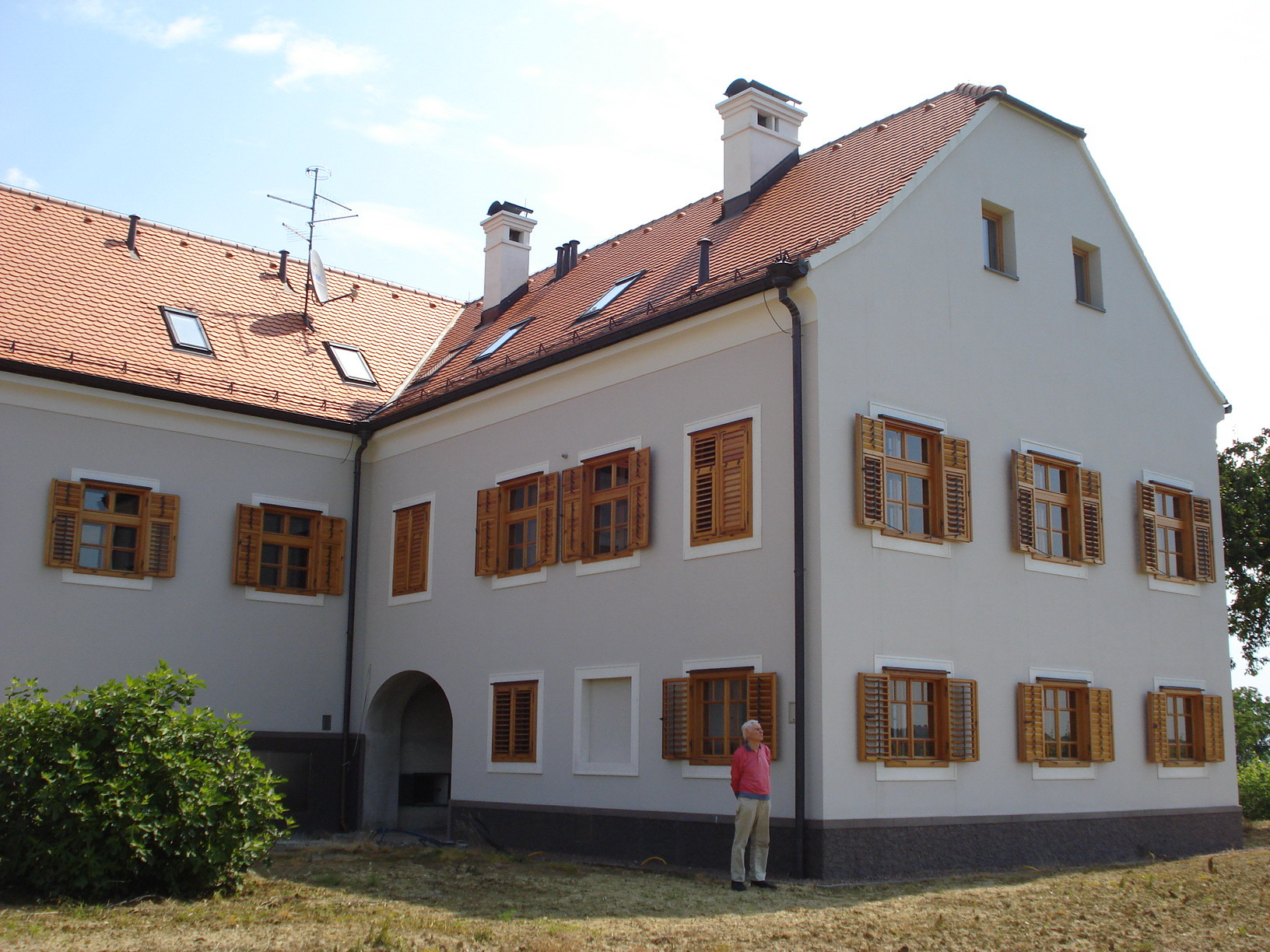
West wing of the manor

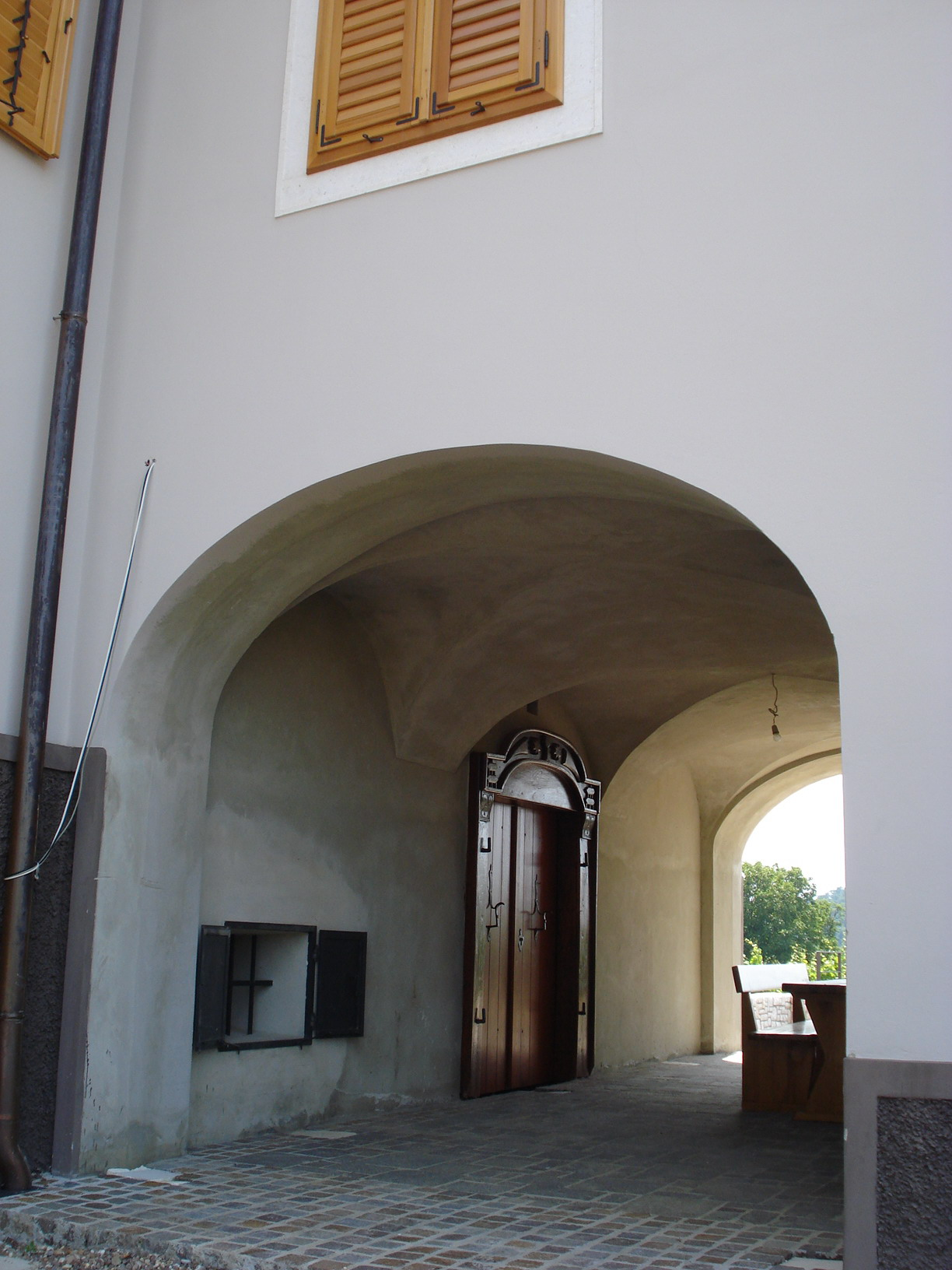
Arcade entrance

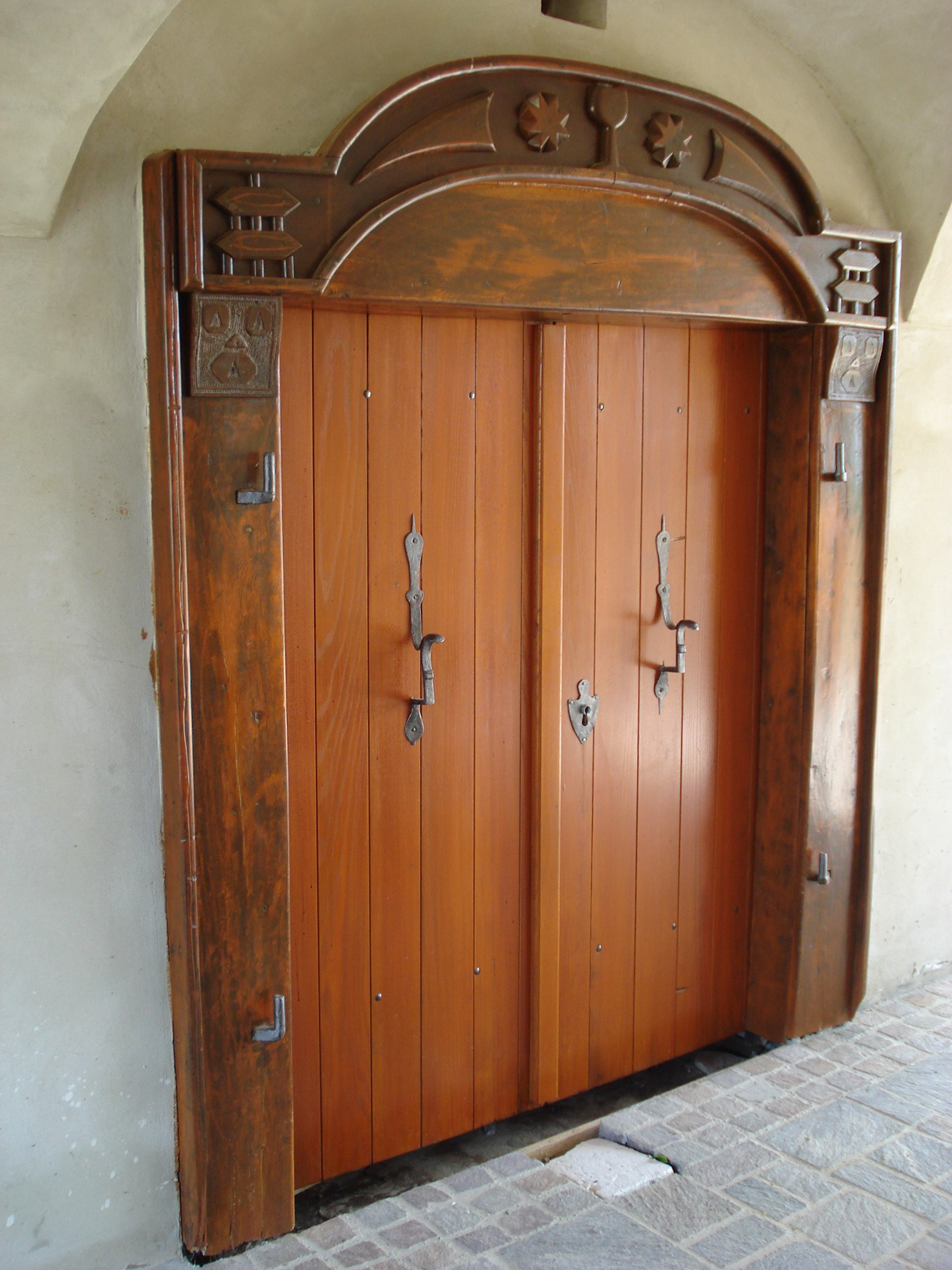
Wine cellar door
