= Banfi, Croatia =

Banfi
- Village
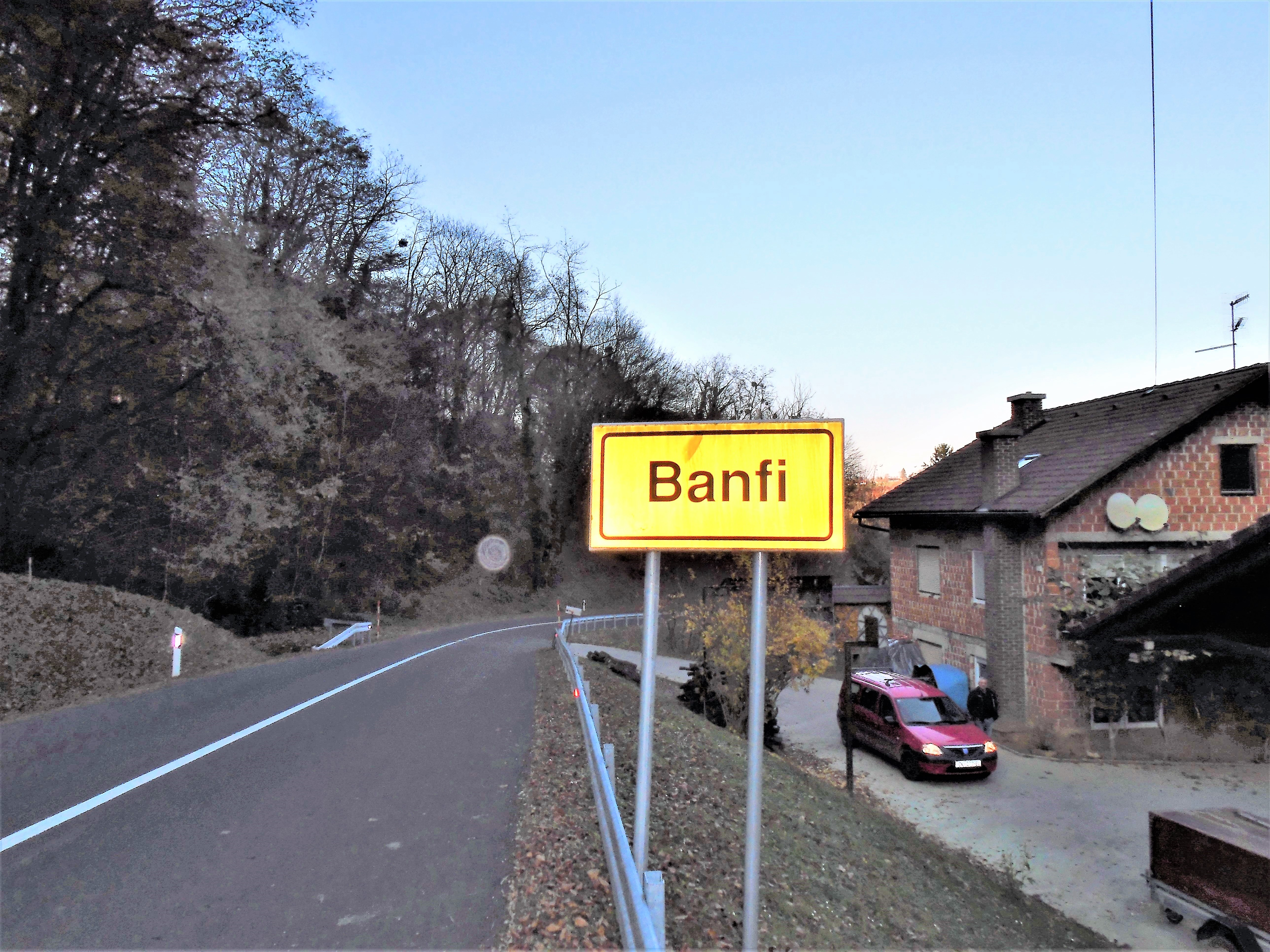
- Banfi Manor

- Location within Croatia
- Coordinates: 46°30′37″N 16°16′52″E
- Country: Croatia
- County: Međimurje County
- Municipality: Štrigova

Area
  - Total: 4.6 km^{2} (1.8 sq mi)

Population (2021)
  - Total: 209
  - Density: 45/km^{2} (120/sq mi)
- Time zone: UTC+1 (CET)
  - Summer (DST): UTC+2 (CEST)
- Postal code: 40312 Štrigova

Banfi is a village in northern Croatia, part of the Štrigova municipality within Međimurje County. The village is located at the border with Slovenia.

== Name ==
The village is named after noble family Bánffy, in whose possession it was. In Hungarian language village is called Bánfihegy ("Banffy's hills").

== History ==
At the site of today's Banfi manor, there was an older castle built by a members of noble family Bánffy de Alsólendva. Castle was probably built in the 14th century.

An urbarium from year 1672 mentions a cellar (Baanffy Cellarium) and vineyards (Vinea Banffi in monte Strigowsky). The cellar and vineyards were in possession of Zrinski noble family.

Banfi Manor, most notable building in village, was built in 18th century on the ruins of castle Banffy.

== Geography ==
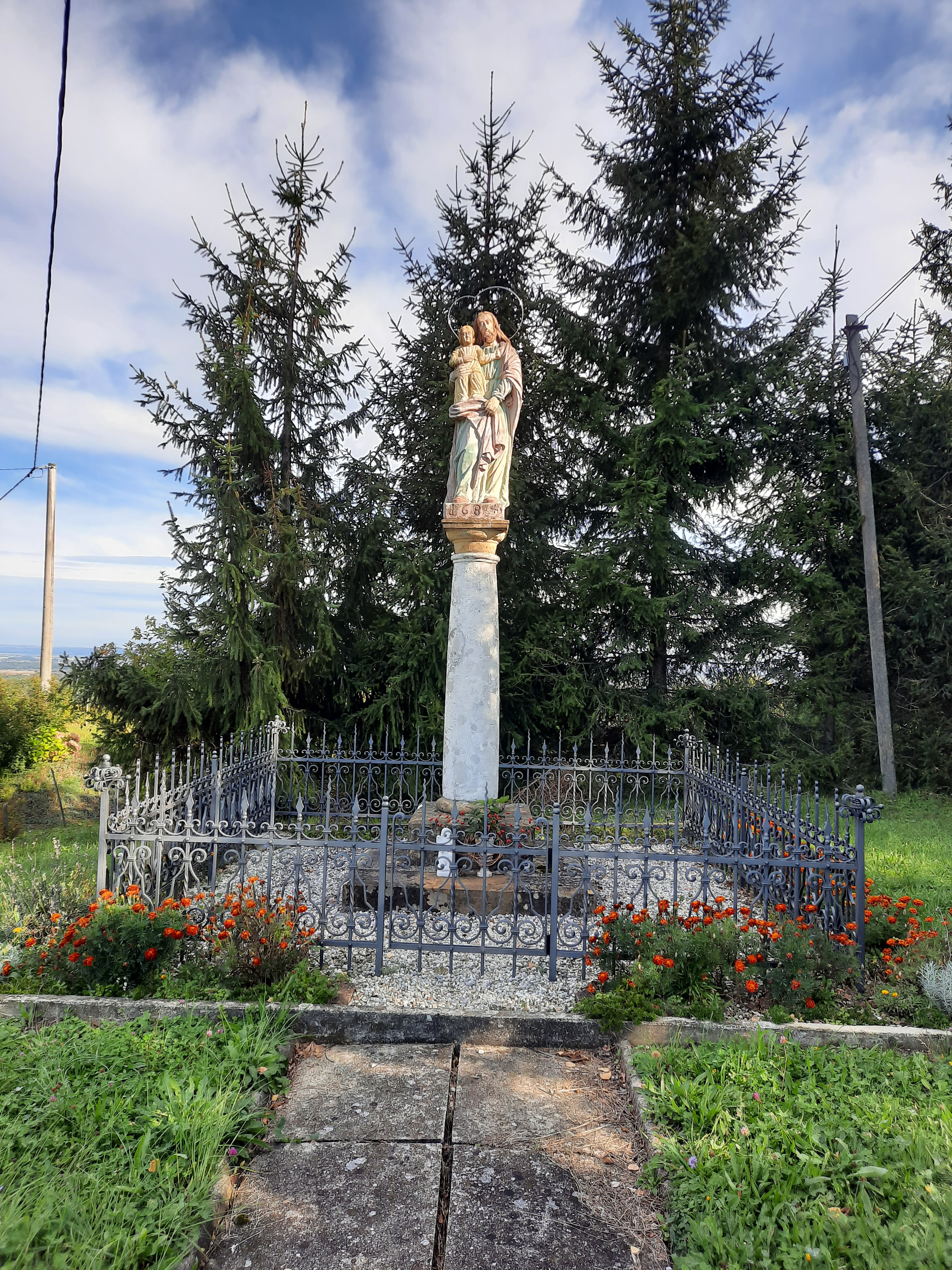
Statue of St Joseph from year 1684

Banfi is located in part of Međimurje called Gornje Međimurje. Banfi is about 20 kilometres northwest from Čakovec, and some 110 kilometres north of Zagreb.

Landscape of Banfi consist of low hills called Međimurske gorice, covered with vineyards, orchards and woodlands.

There is a border crossing with Slovenia in Banfi. Border crossing is located on road that connects county seat Čakovec with town of Ljutomer in Slovenia.

Banfi had a population of 262 in 2011 census. Banfi is experiencing population decline since the 1960s.

Historical population

Year	Pop.	±%
1921	576	—
1931	620	+7.6%
1948	650	+4.8%
1953	716	+10.2%
1961	626	−12.6%

Year	Pop.	±%
1971	594	−5.1%
1981	426	−28.3%
1991	411	−3.5%
2001	390	−5.1%
2011	262	−32.8%
