= Štrigova =

- Municipality
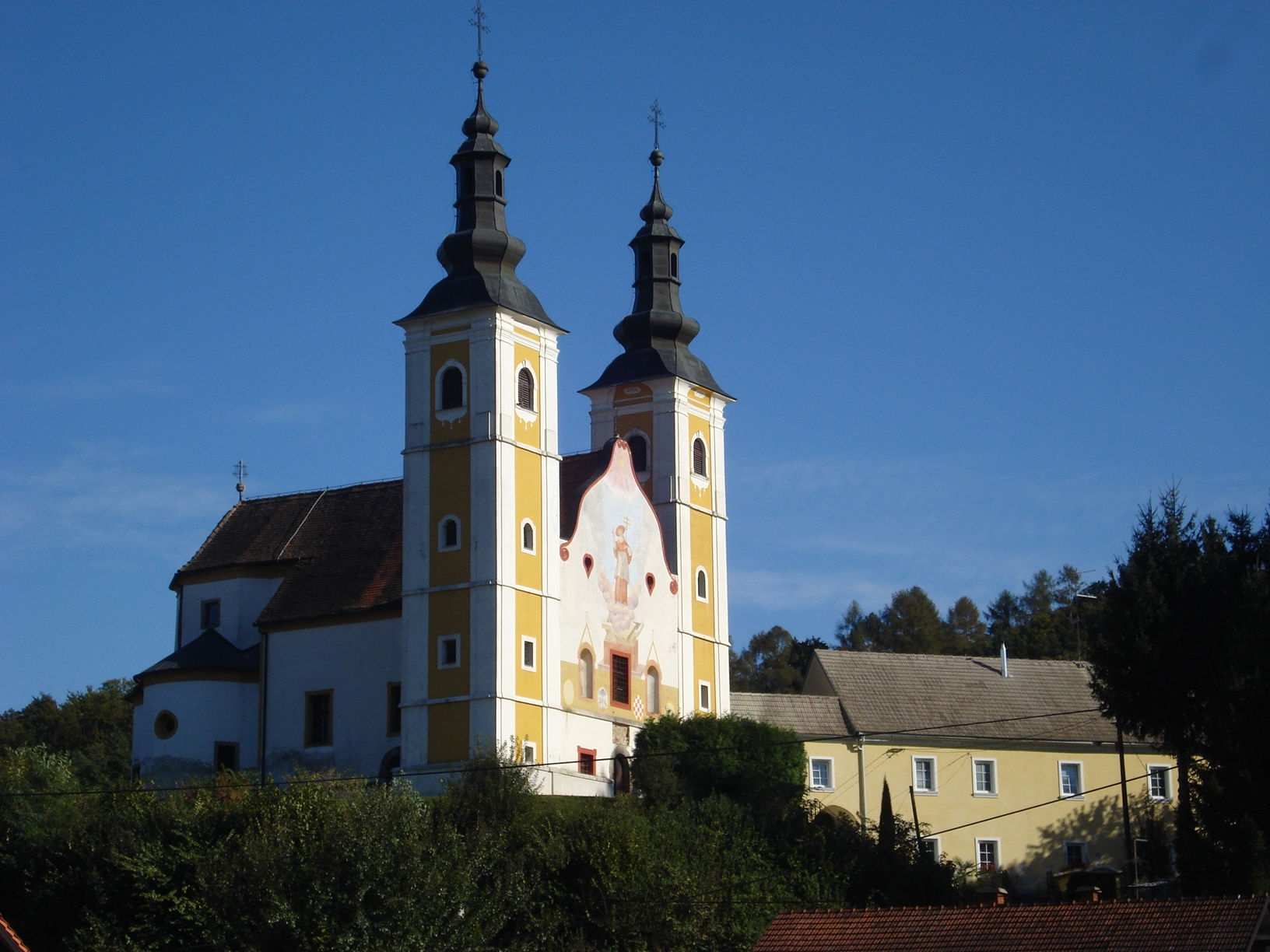
- Church of Saint Jerome

- Location within Croatia
- Coordinates: 46°30′04″N 16°17′06″E
- Country: Croatia
- Region: Northern Croatia (Međimurje)
- County: Međimurje County

Government
  - Municipal mayor: Stanislav Rebernik (SDP)

Area
  - Municipality: 39.3 km^{2} (15.2 sq mi)
  - Urban: 2.1 km^{2} (0.81 sq mi)

Population (2021)
  - Municipality: 2,357
  - Density: 60.0/km^{2} (155/sq mi)
  - Urban: 436
  - Urban density: 210/km^{2} (540/sq mi)
- Time zone: UTC+1 (CET)
  - Summer (DST): UTC+2 (CEST)
- Postal code: 40312 Štrigova
- Website: opcinastrigova.hr

Štrigova (Hungarian: Stridóvár; outdated German name: Stridau) is a village and municipality in Međimurje County, in northern Croatia.

== History ==
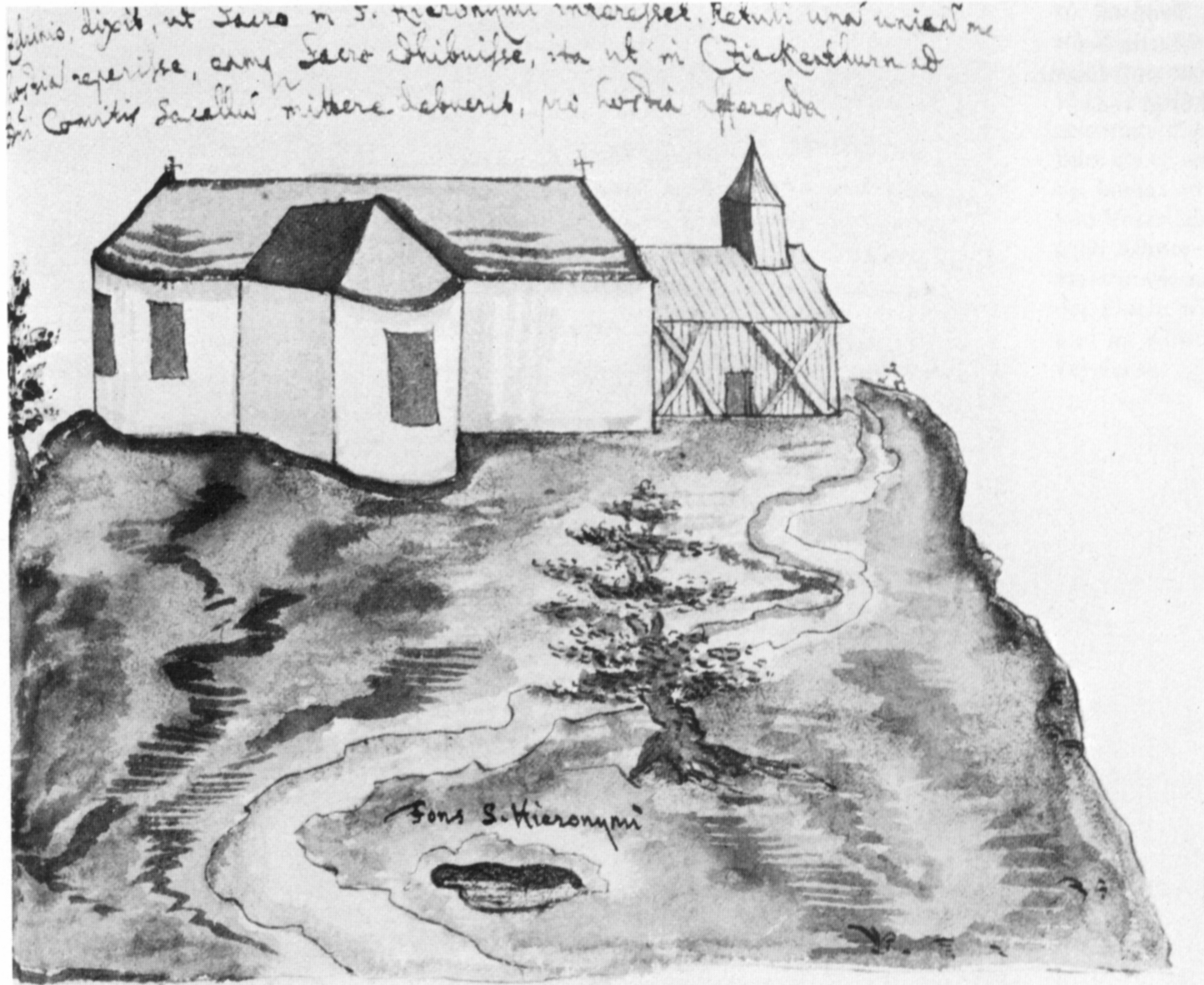
Saint Jerome chapel in 17th century

The oldest archaeological finds in Štrigova municipality are from the Roman period. Burial mounds, fragments of pottery and fragments of Roman roads have been found in the hamlet of Trnovčak.

The settlement of Štrigova was first mentioned in 1271 as Castr. Strigo (English: Fort Strigo). During that time the fort was in the possession of Arnold of Stridó. In 1290 Andrew the Venetian, later king of Hungary and Croatia, was captured in the fort by Arnold of Stridó, and was sent to Vienna in captivity. In 1334 Štrigova was recorded as a Catholic parish named Sancte Marie Magdalene de Strigo in the Census of parishes of the Zagreb Diocese. From the late Middle Ages until the beginning of the 20th century, Štrigova had the status of a Market town.

During the 15th century, the feudal proprietor of Međimurje Frederick II, Count of Celje built the wooden chapel of saint Jerome in Štrigova. In 1447, the Papal bull Gloriosus Deus in sanctis suis (English: God is glorius in his Saints) was promulgated by Pope Nicholas V for the Church of Saint Jerome in Štrigova. In that document, Štrigova is mentioned as the birthplace of Saint Jerome although this claim is disputed by some scholars.

In 1931, the Štrigova municipality was separated from Čakovec and the rest of Međimurje and placed under the authority of the Ljutomer District in Drava Banovina. In April 1941 Međimurje was occupied by the Hungarian Army, but Štrigova was occupied by the German Army. In June 1941, at the request of Hungary, Štrigova was again reincorporated into Međimurje.

In April 1945, the former municipality of Štrigova provisionally became a part of the Yugoslav Federal republic of Slovenia. In 1946 the municipality was divided between the People's Republics of Croatia and Slovenia. The villages Banfi, Grabrovnik, Jalšovec, Leskovec, Prekopa, Robadje, Stanetinec, Sveti Urban and Štrigova became a part of Croatia, while Gibina, Globoka, Kopriva, Razkrižje, Šafarsko, Šprinc, and Veščica became a part of Slovenia. In 1947, in a forest near Štrigova, Yugoslavian secret police (OZNA) murdered dozens of members of anticommunist guerrilla called Crusaders (Croatian: Križari).

In 1992 Štrigova regained the status of a municipality.

== Geography ==
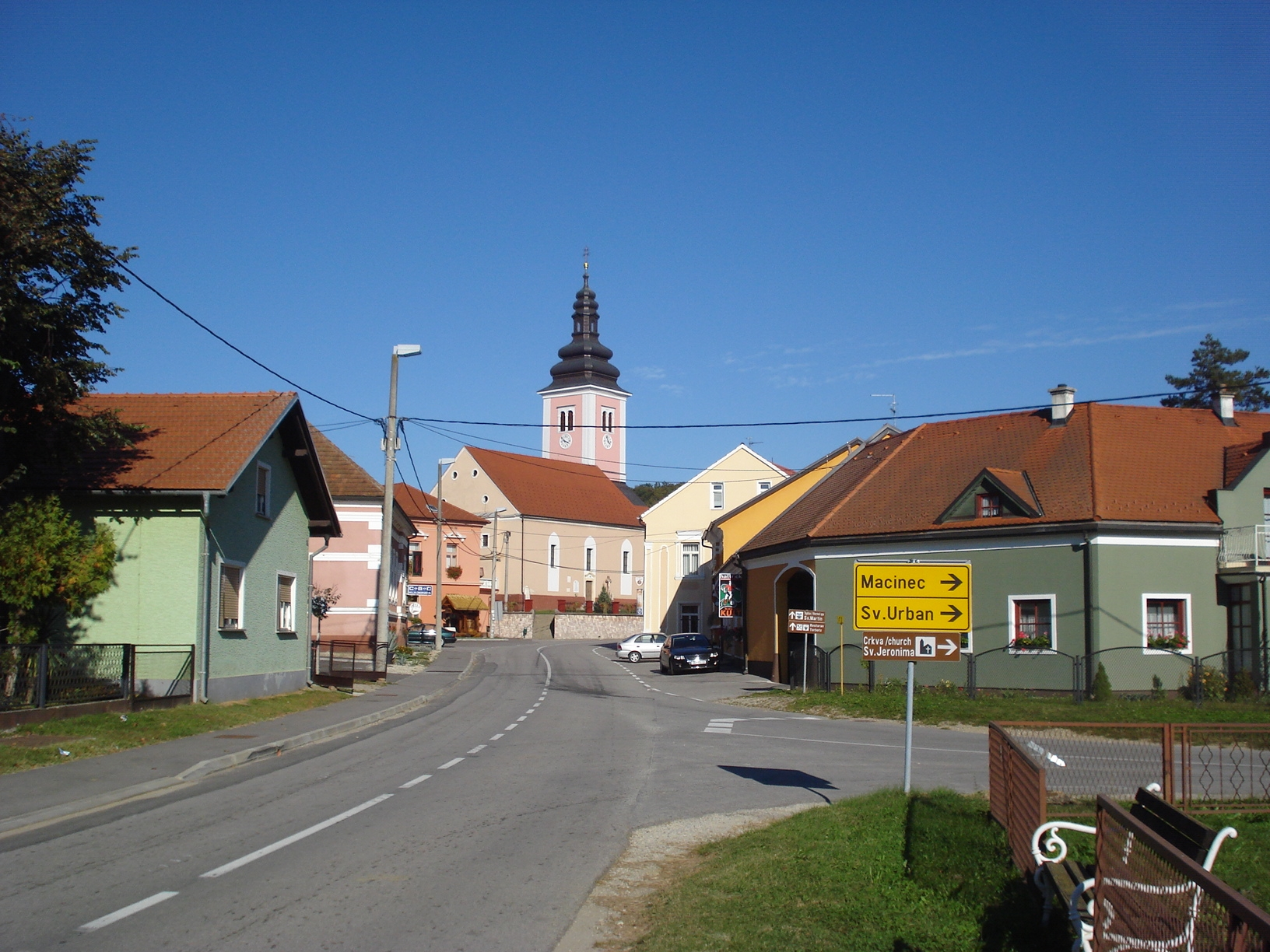
Main Street in Štrigova

Štrigova is located in upper Međimurje at the border with Slovenia. The village of Štrigova, the municipality centre, is located around 19 kilometres northwest from Čakovec, and some 110 kilometres north of Zagreb. The municipality covers an area of 39.21 km^{2}.

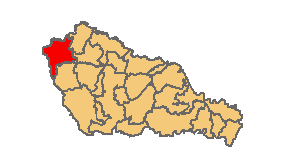
Location within Međimurje County

The landscape of Štrigova consists of low hills called Međimurske gorice, covered with vineyards, orchards and woodlands. Međimurske gorice are an extension of Slovenske gorice. At 341 metres, Mađerkin breg is the highest hill in municipality, and also a popular viewpoint.

Štrigova is located on the road that connects the county seat Čakovec with the town of Ljutomer in Slovenia. There are two border crossings with Slovenia in the municipality called Banfi and Bukovje.

== Demographics ==
In the 2021 census, the municipality had a population of 2,357 in the following settlements:

Village	Population
Banfi	209
Grabrovnik	240
Jalšovec	111
Leskovec	83
Prekopa	224
Robadje	126
Stanetinec	175
Sveti Urban	374
Štrigova	436
Železna Gora	379

The majority of inhabitants are Croats making up 94.53% of the population and the most significant minority are Slovenes at 3.48%.

Štrigova: Population trends 1857–2021
v

population	3708	4053	3788	3841	4406	4675	4492	4873	5157	5115	4606	4315	3703	3346	3221	2766	2357
	1857	1869	1880	1890	1900	1910	1921	1931	1948	1953	1961	1971	1981	1991	2001	2011	2021

Sources: Croatian Bureau of Statistics publications

== Administration ==
The current mayor of Štrigova is Stanislav Rebernik and the Štrigova Municipal Council consists of 9 seats.

Groups	Councilors per group
SDP-HNS-Reformists	7 / 9
HDZ	2 / 9

== Economy ==
The economy of the municipality is largely focused on winemaking. There are many wine cellars throughout Štrigova, most of which are privately owned, but there is also a large communally-owned wine cellar.

== Culture ==
The Church of St. Jerome was built in the 15th century but was destroyed in an earthquake in 1738. The church was rebuilt in 1749 and contains artwork by painter Ivan Ranger. There are also two historical castles located in the municipality. The Banfi Manor was mentioned in the 13th century but was built mostly in the 18th century on the Banfi hill. The Tkalec Castle on Kalec hill was built by local Paulines in the 18th century and was later owned by the Zichy family.

== Gallery ==
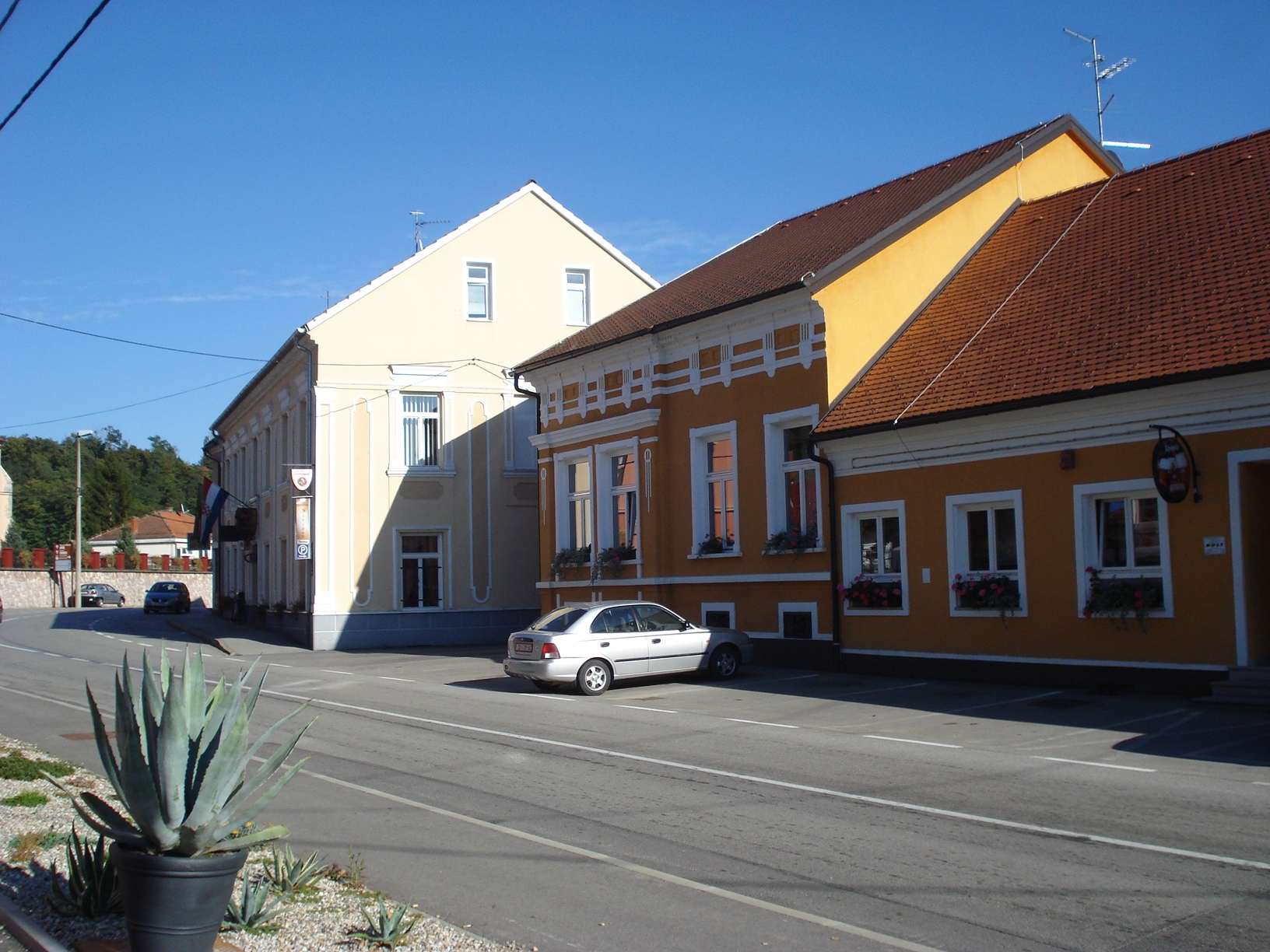
Centre of the village

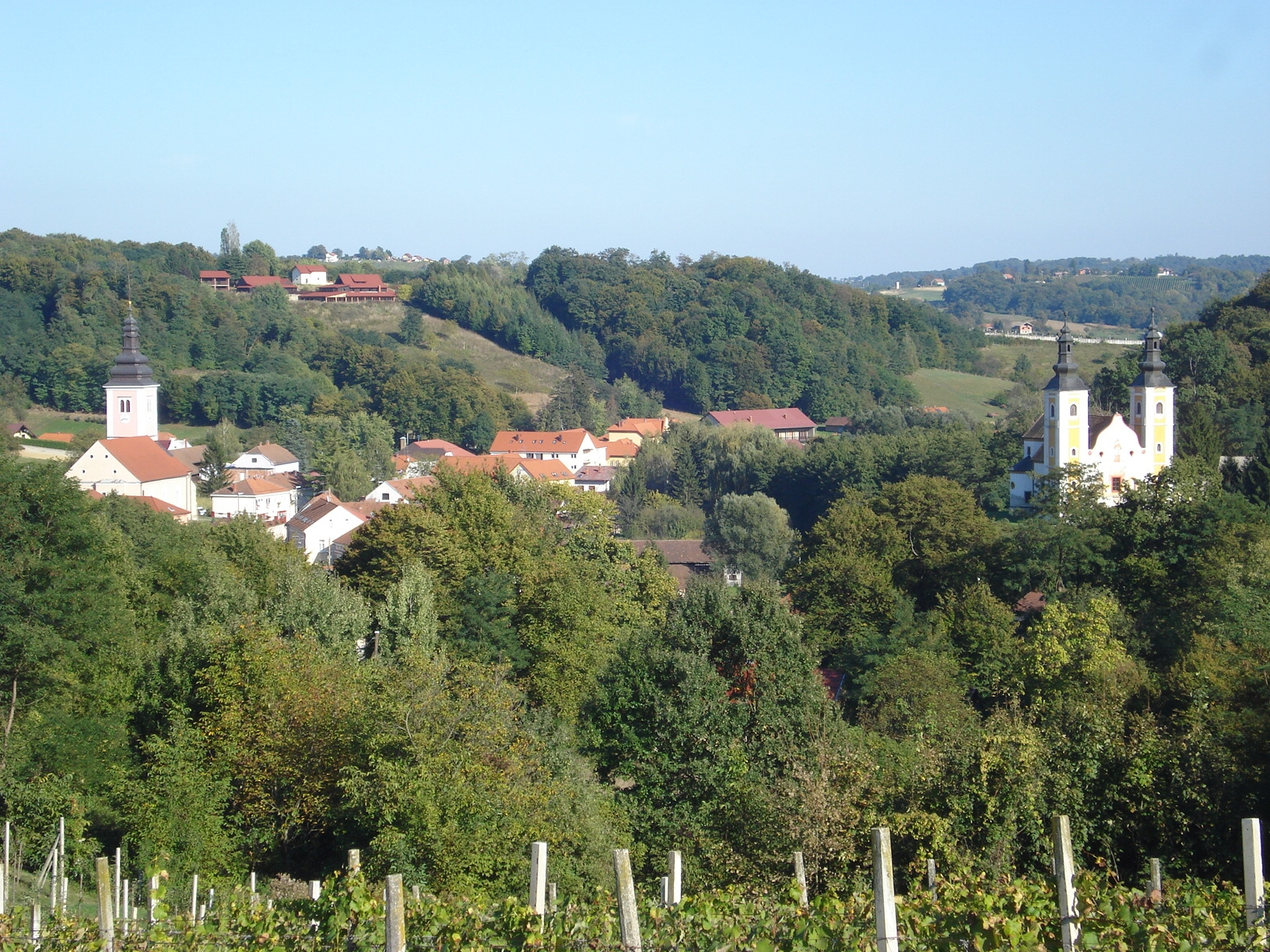
Panoramic view

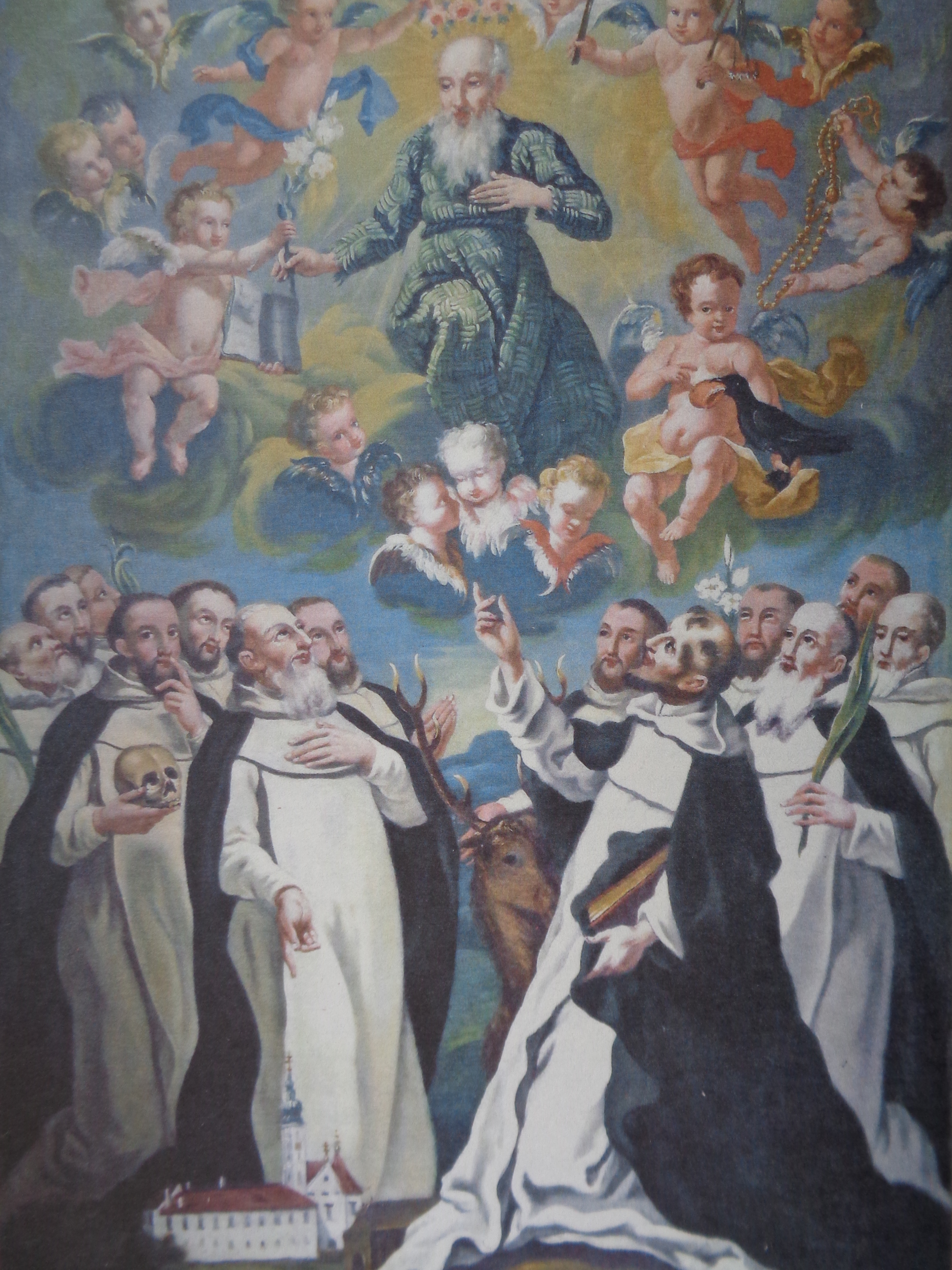
Saint Jerome and the Paulines painted by Gabriel Thaller in the St. Jerome Church in Štrigova (18th century)

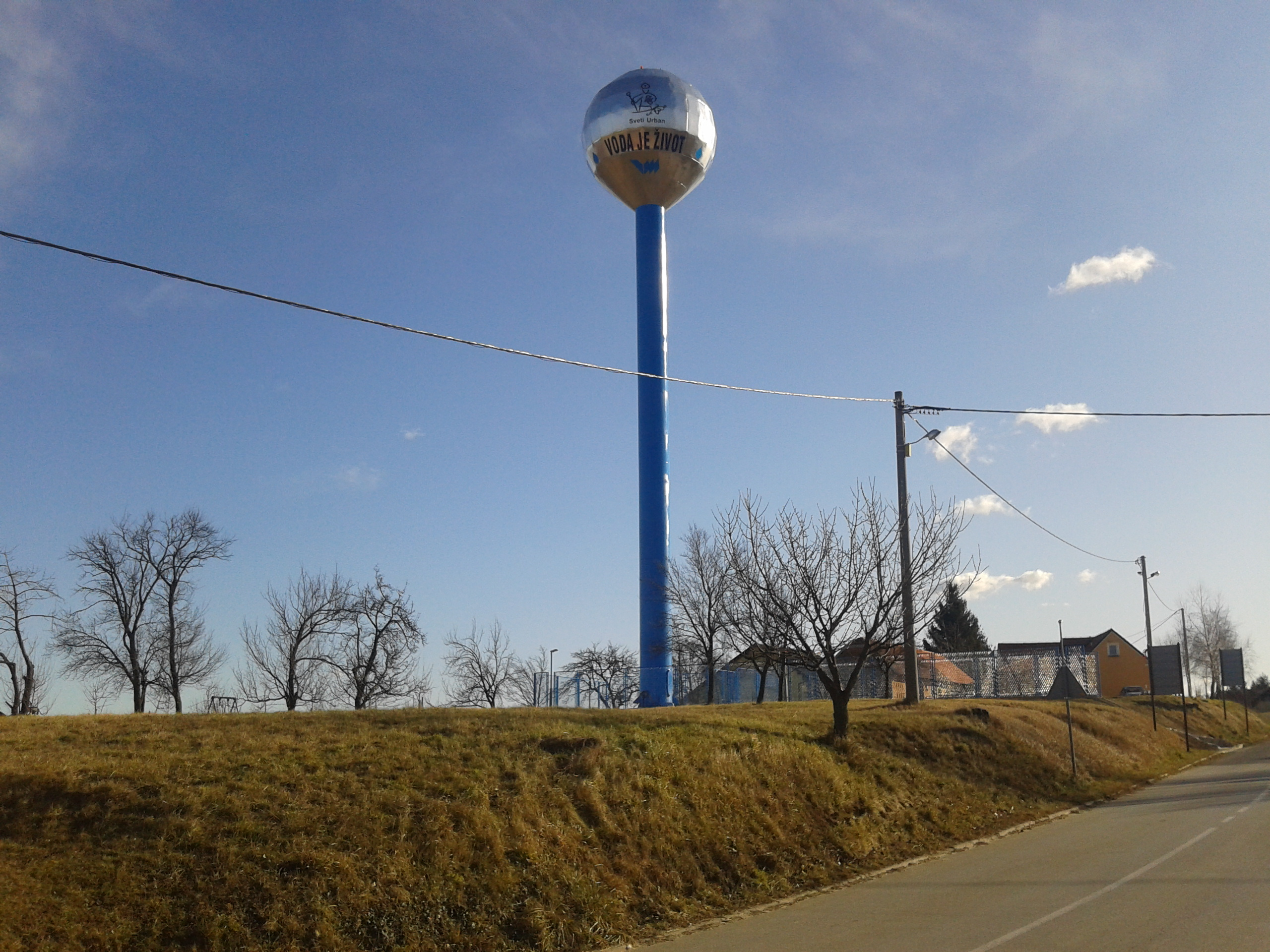
Sveti Urban water tower

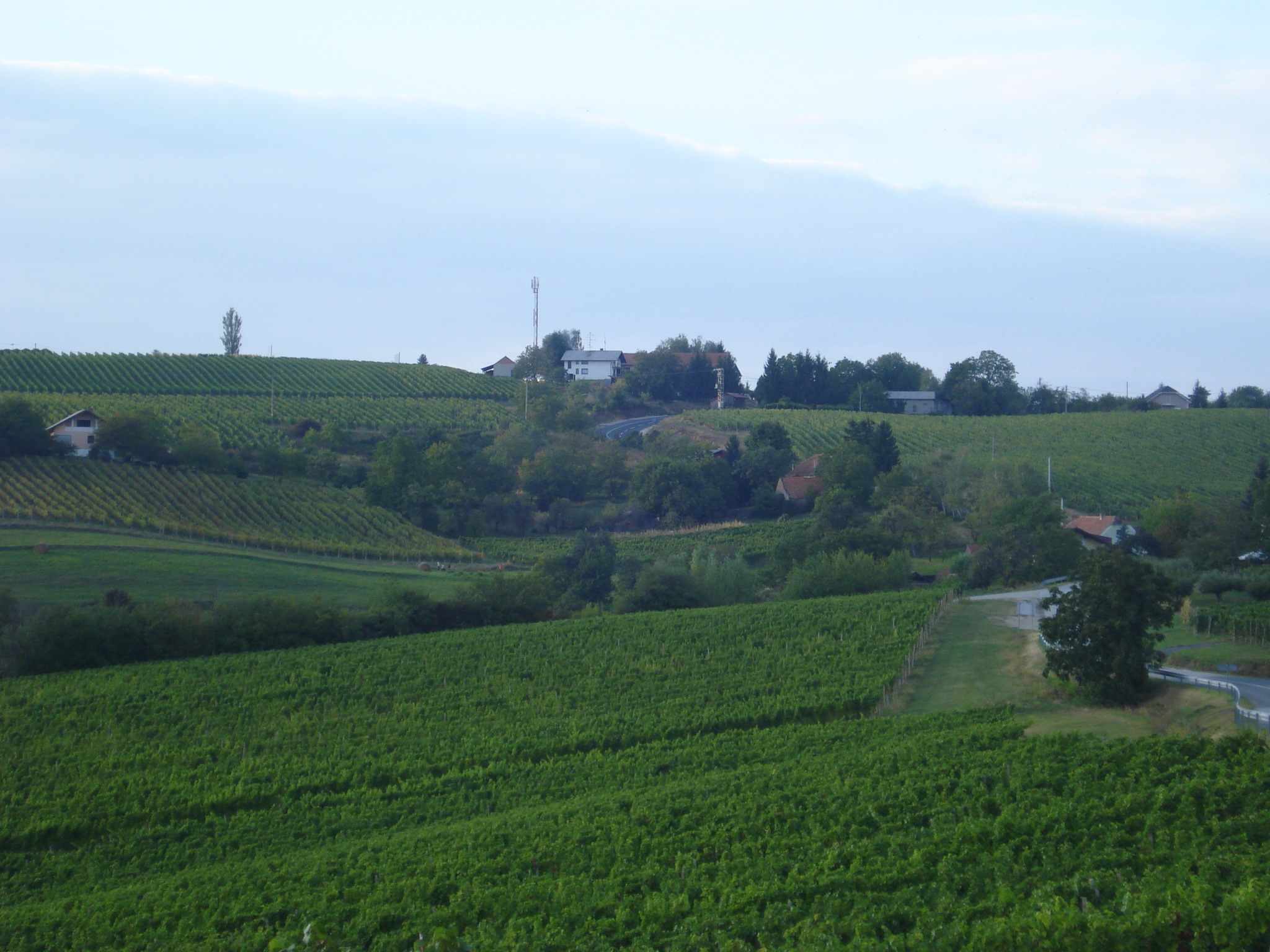
Železna Gora

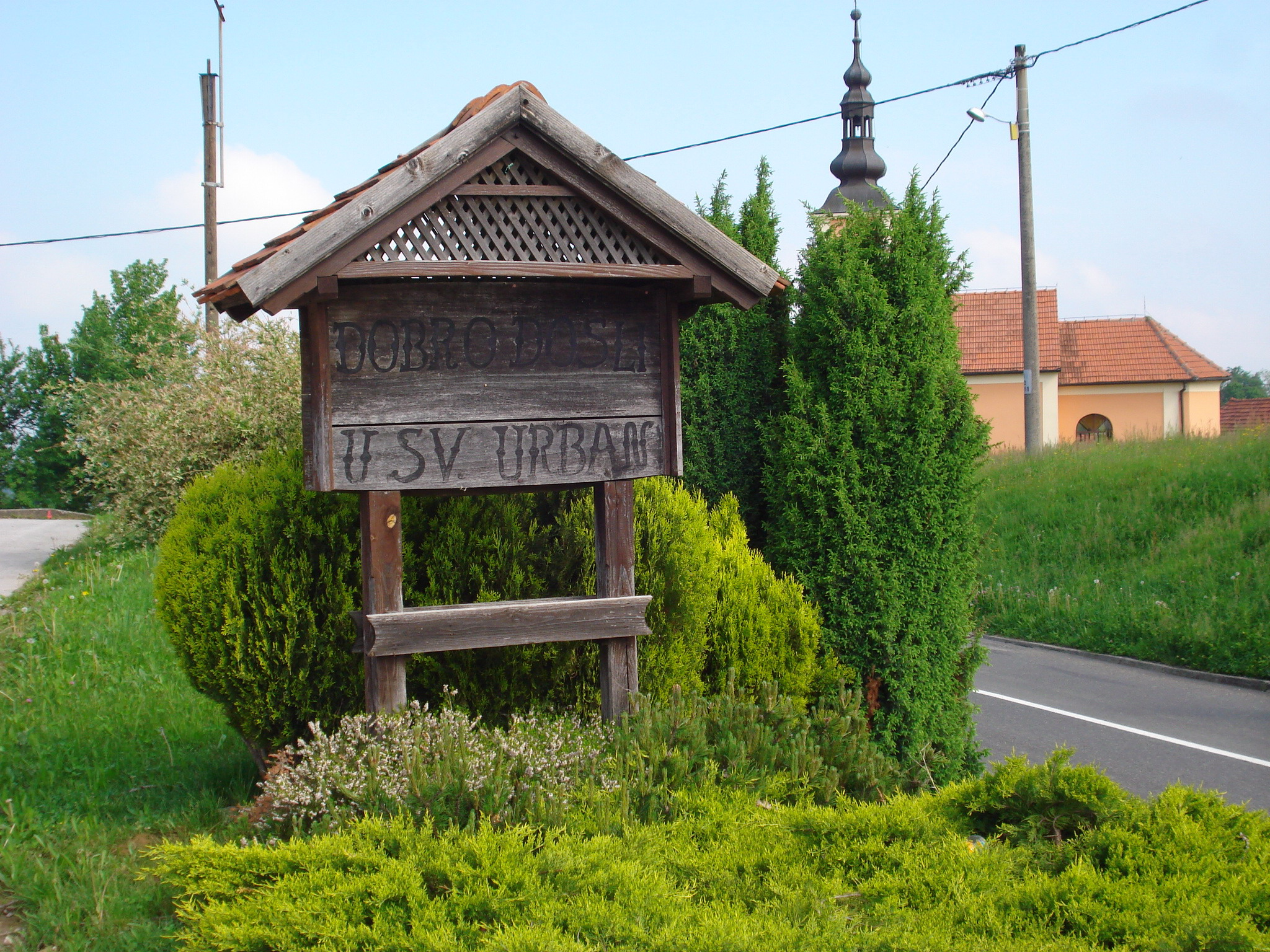
Sveti Urban

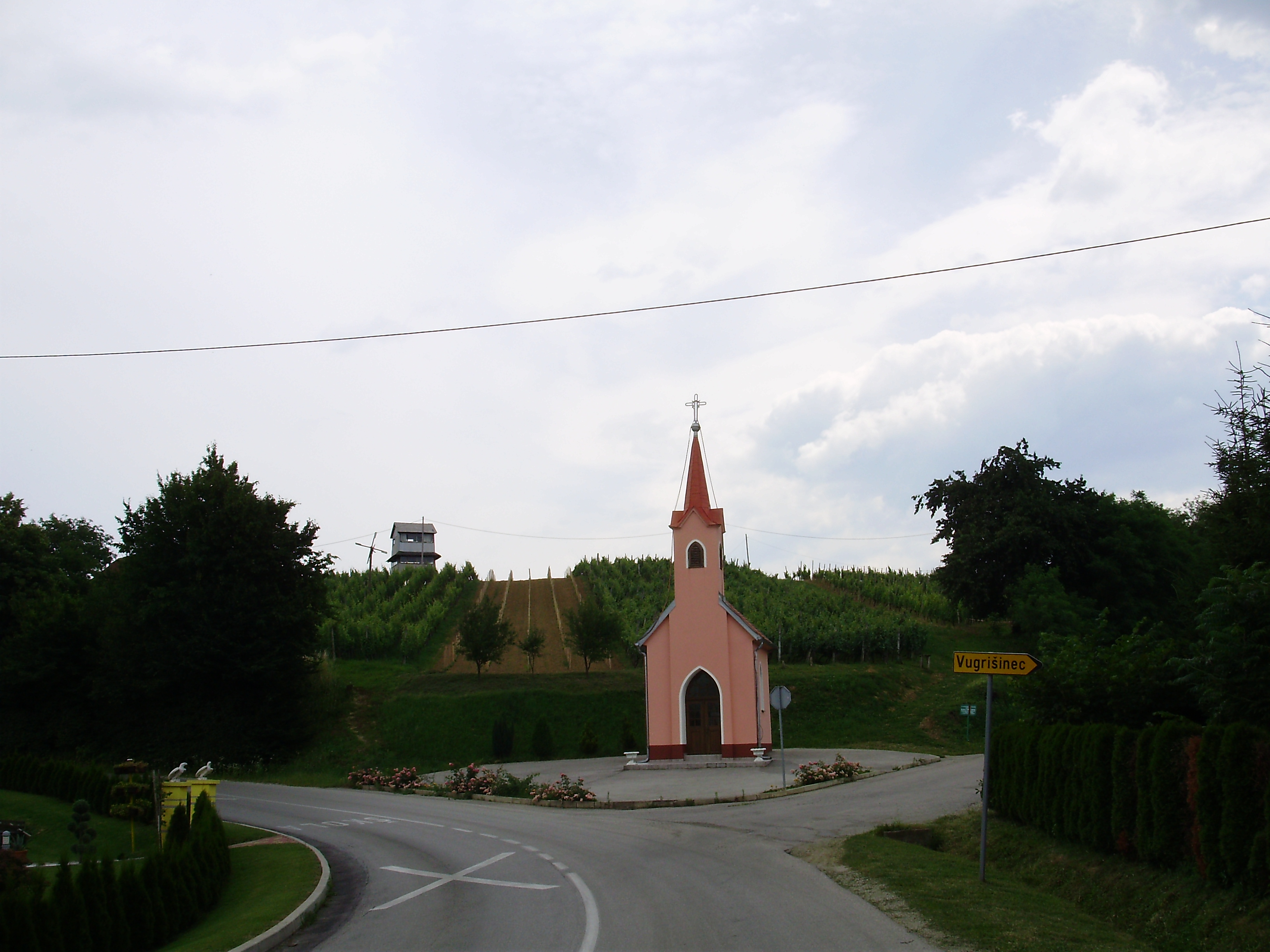
Prekopa

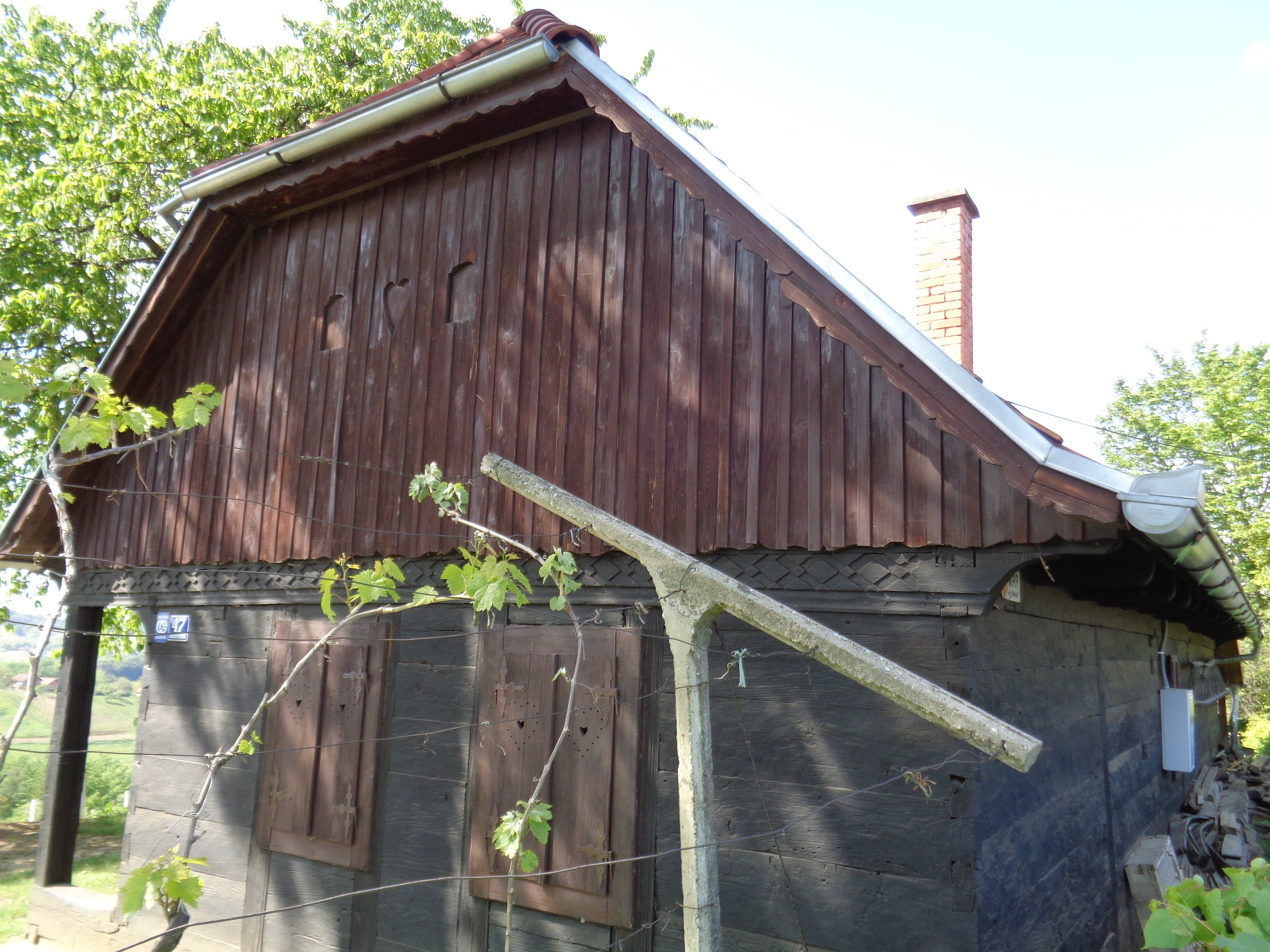
Old cottage in Grabrovnik

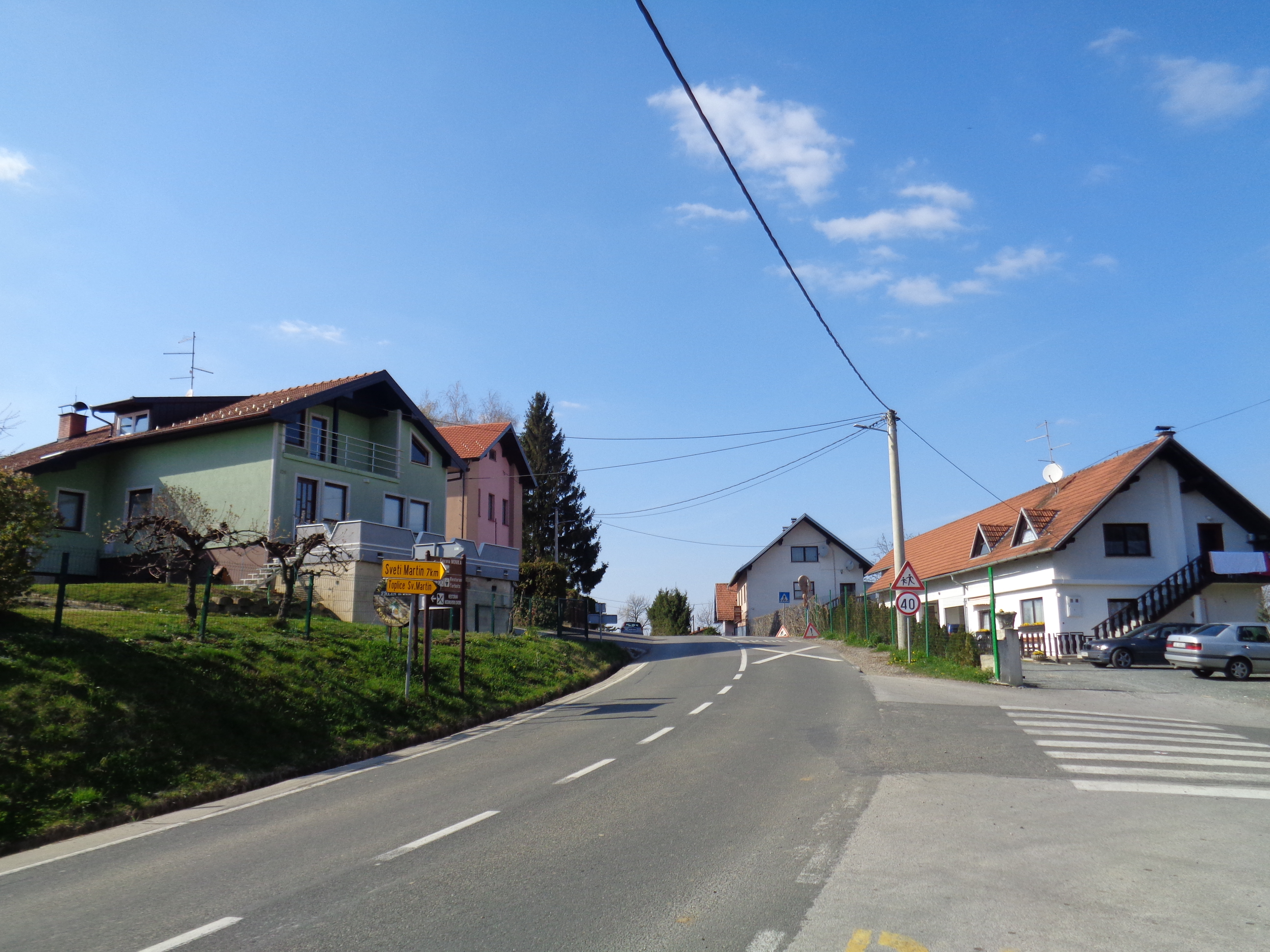
Železna Gora - village centre

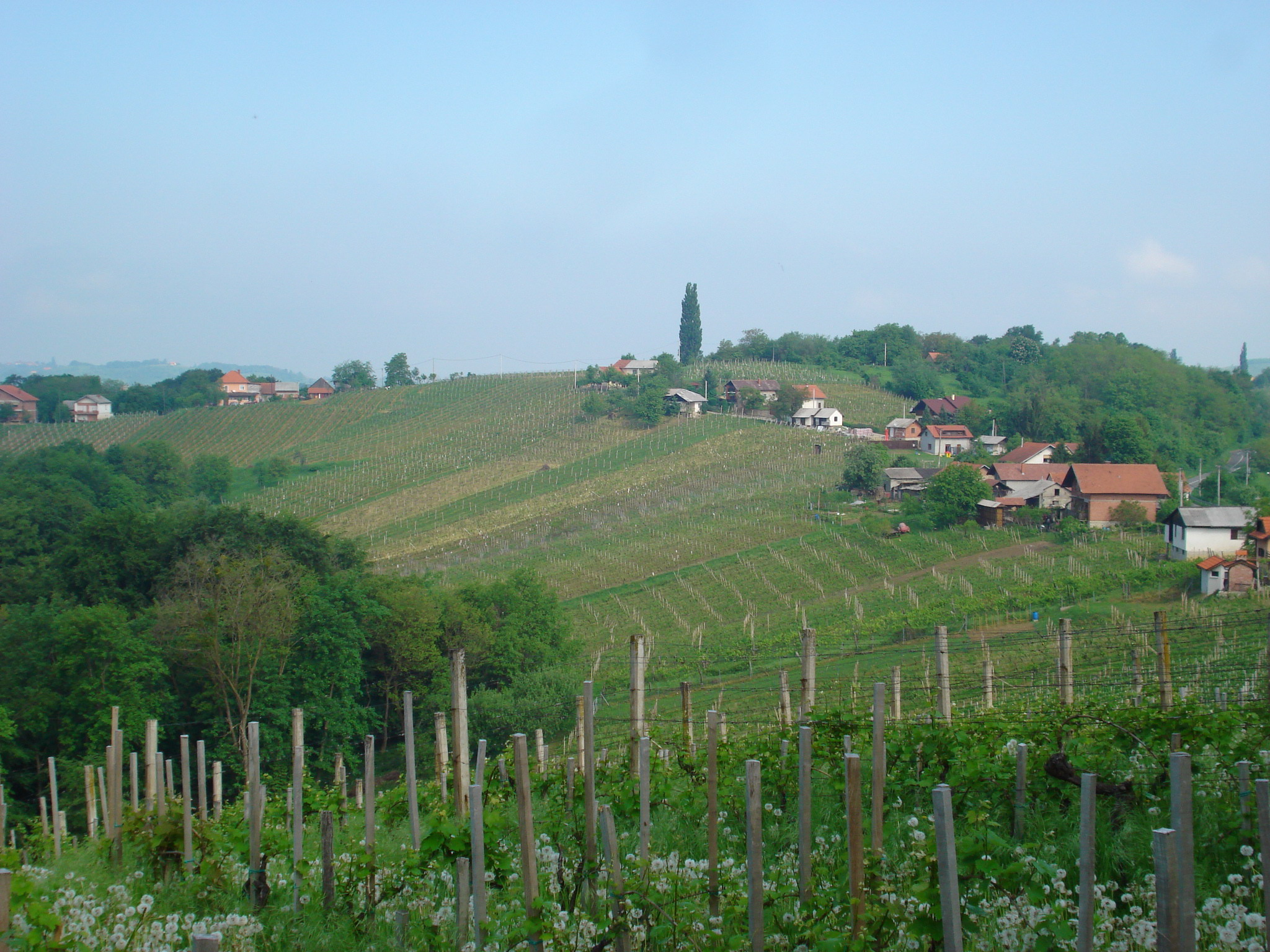
Sveti Urban

== See also ==
- Banfi Manor
- Tkalec Manor
