= Tkalec Manor =

Building in northern Croatia

Coordinates: 46°29′44″N 16°15′50″E

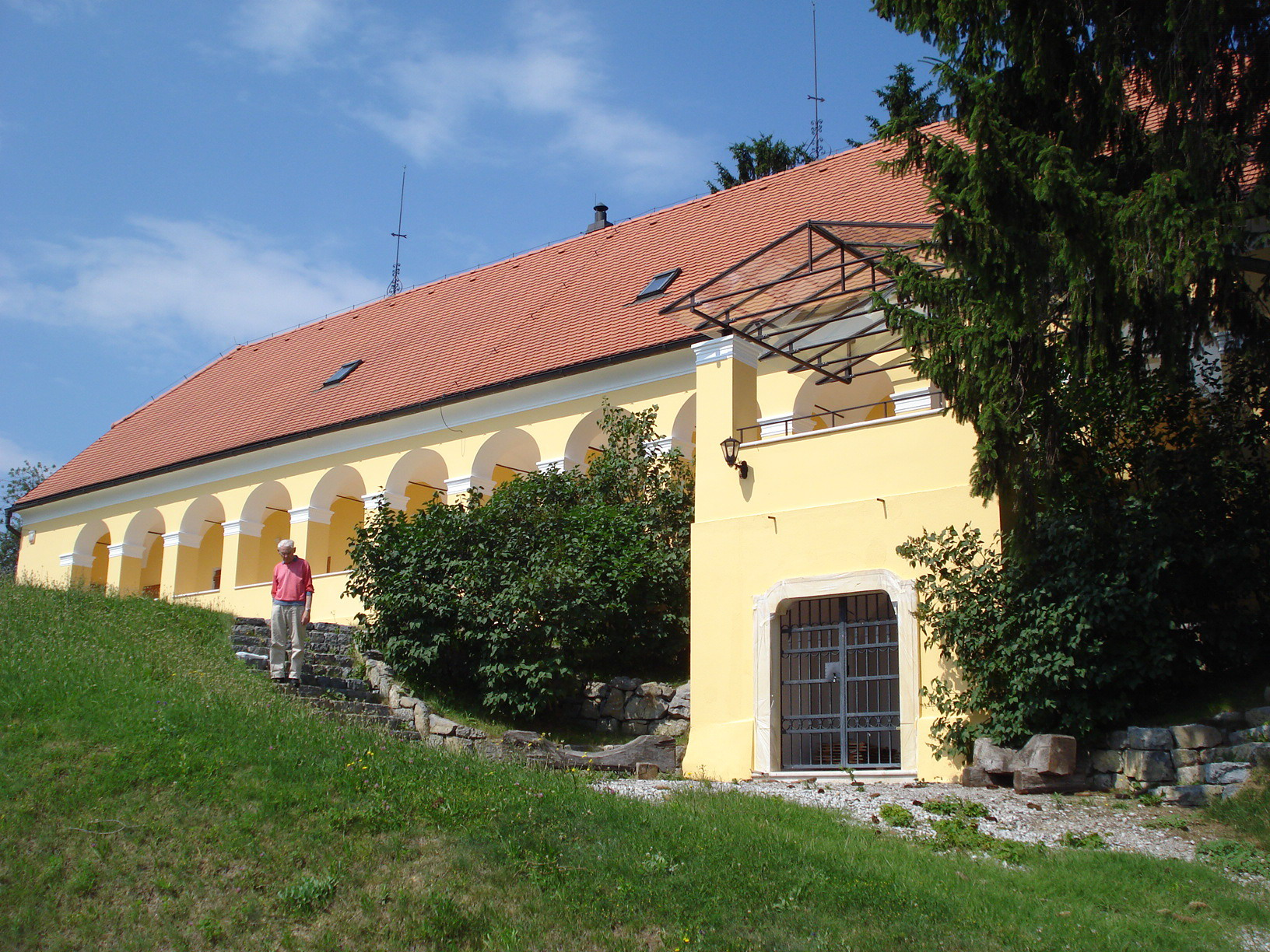
Tkalec Manor - southeast view

Tkalec Manor (Croatian: Dvorac Tkalec or Kurija Tkalec) is a baroque building situated next to the village of Štrigova in Međimurje County, northern Croatia.

It was built in the mid-18th century and first owned by the members of the Pauline Catholic Order in Štrigova, until their order was abolished by the Croato-Hungarian king Joseph II of Habsburg in 1786. In the 19th century it was owned by the counts of Zichy, who had estates in the neighbouring Slovenian region of Prekmurje as well. Before the national independence of Croatia, it was run until 1990 by a local peasants' agricultural cooperative society. After that it was privatized.

The manor itself has a long porch with arcades in the southeastern side. There is a large cellar inside with an old and huge wooden wine press from 1858. It was used for the wine production based on the widespread vineyards on the surrounding hills of that area.

== Gallery ==
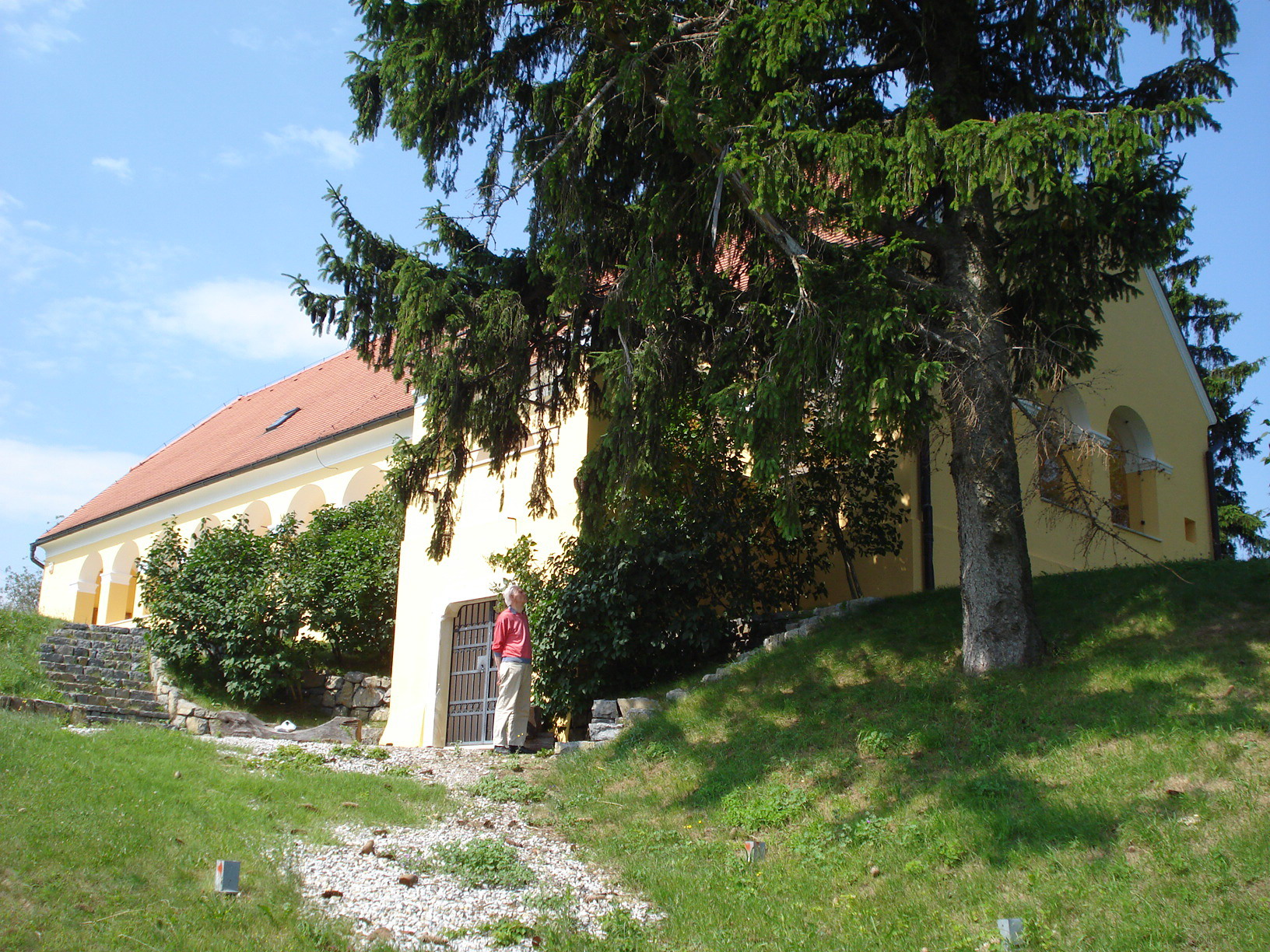
East view of the Manor

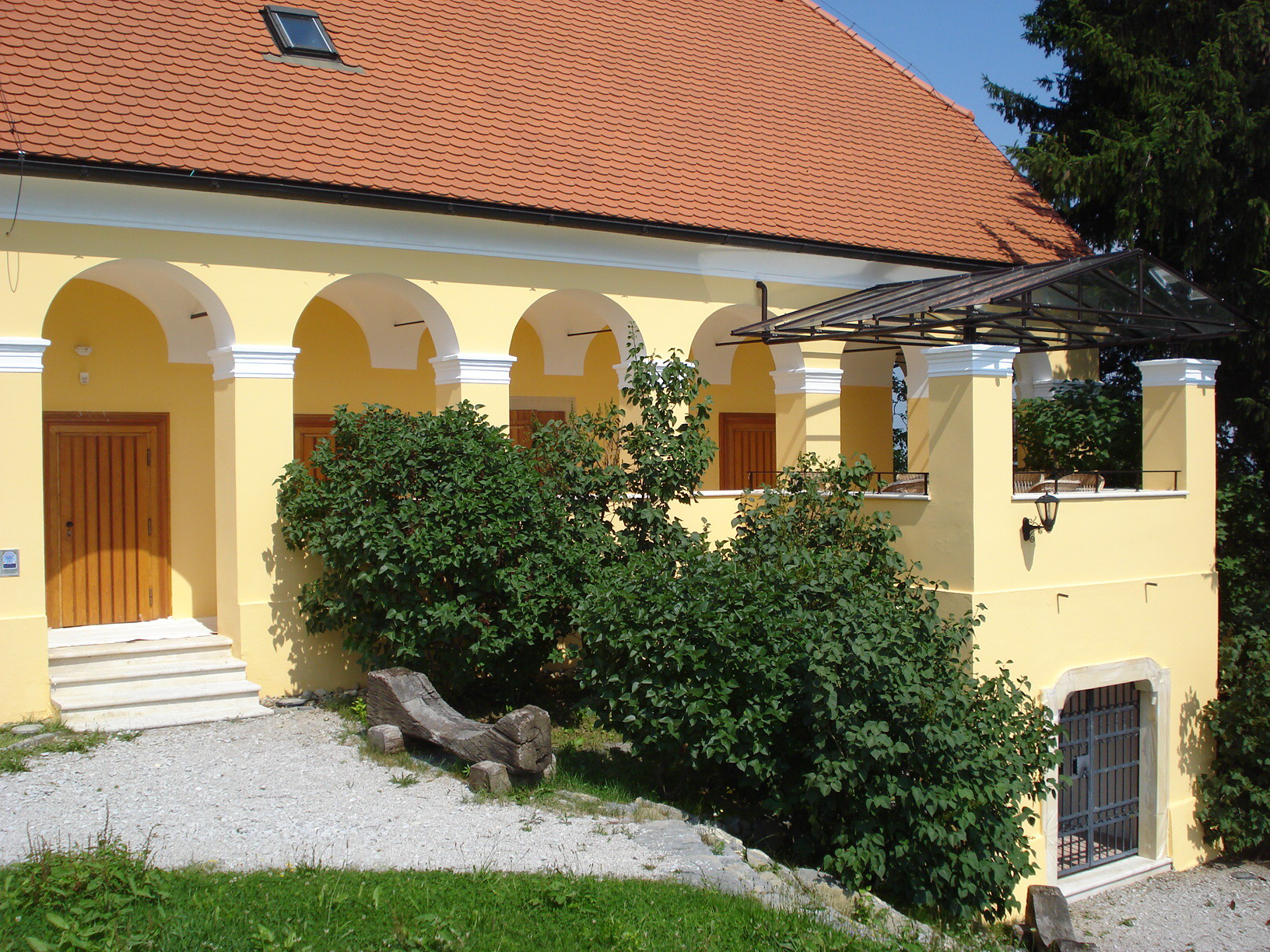
Manor entrance

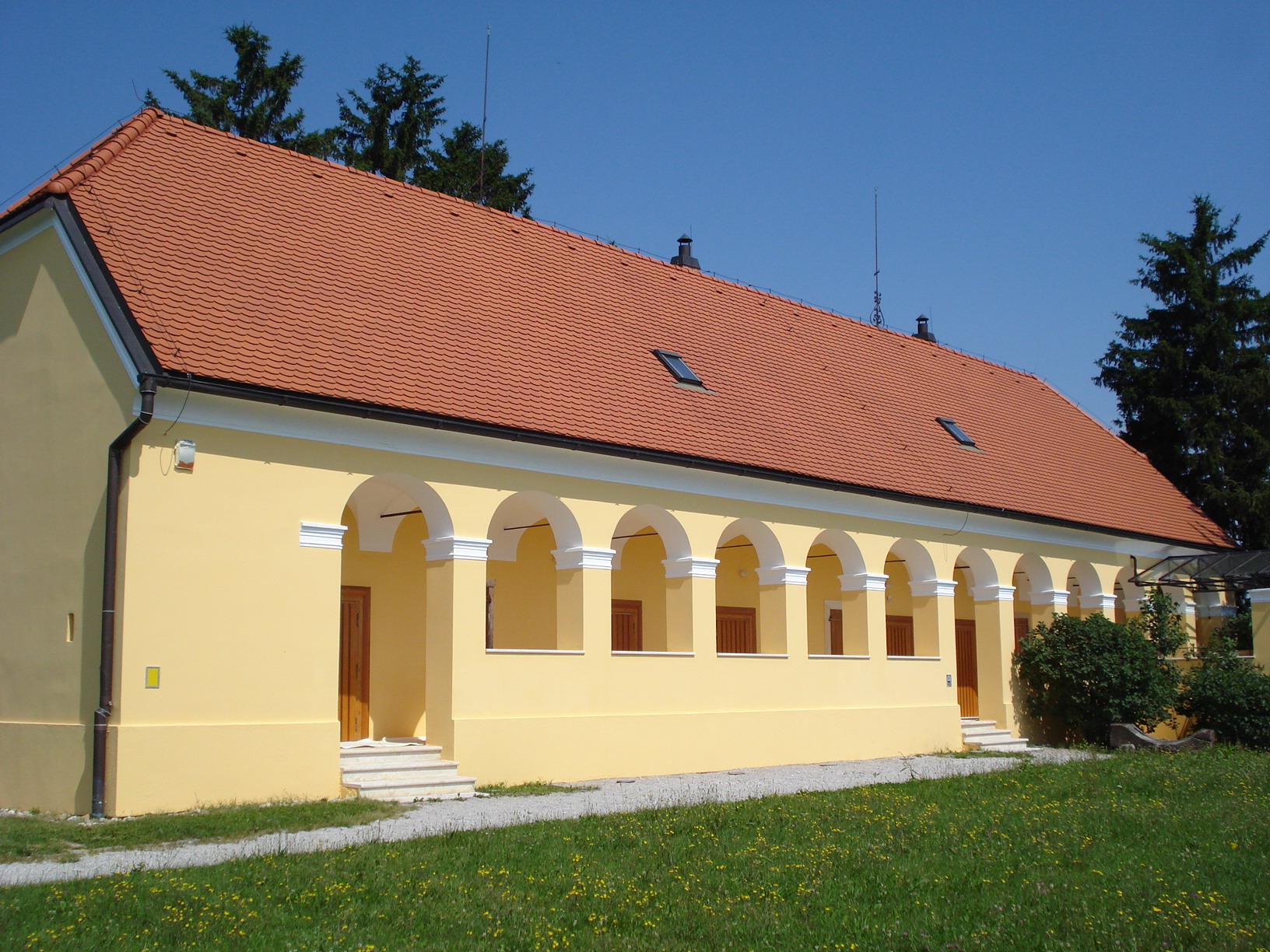
South view of the Manor

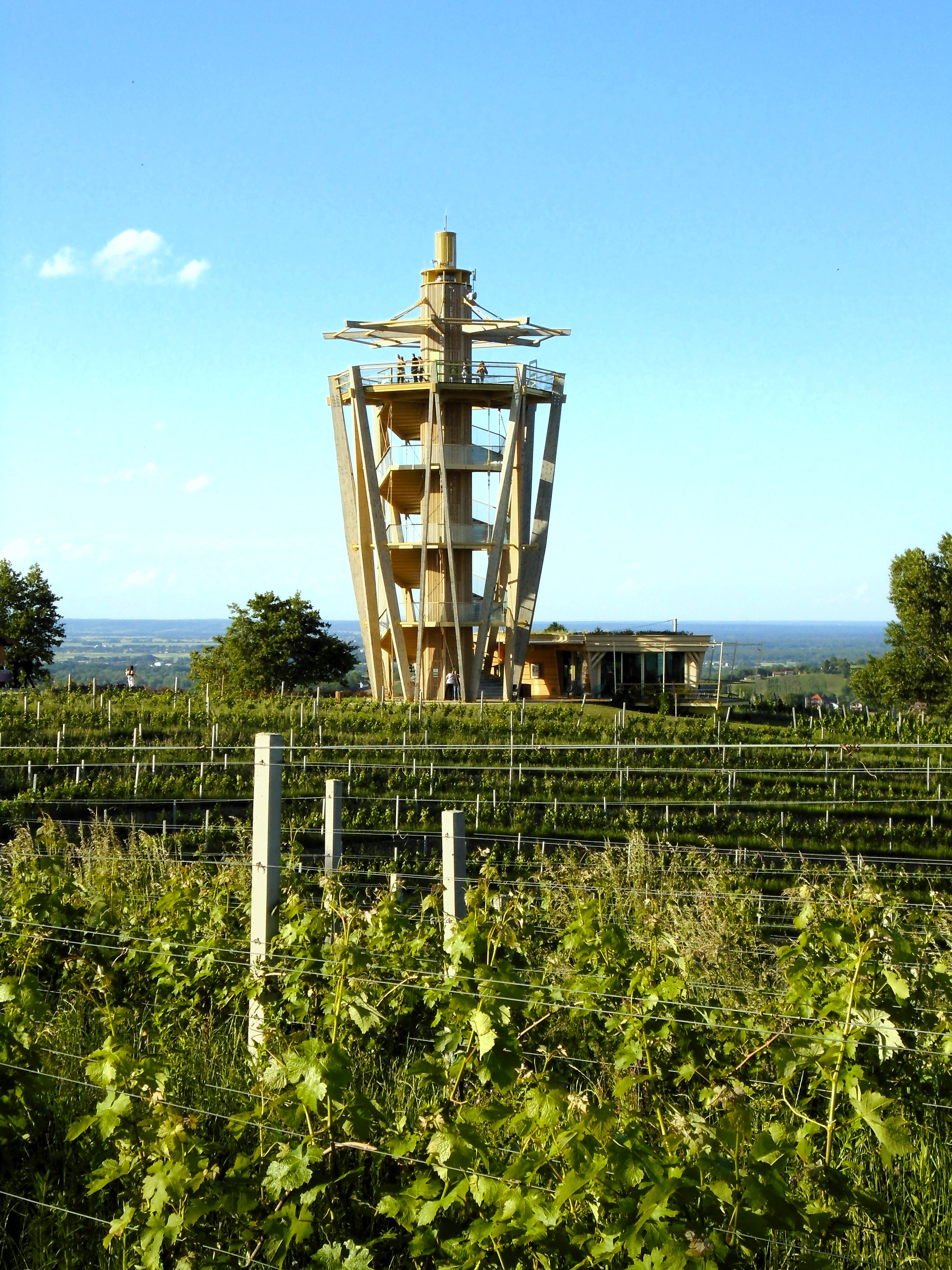
Mađerkin breg viewpoint is located a few hundred meters away from the Manor

== See also ==
- List of castles in Croatia
- Zichy
