= Zwola =

Zwola may refer to the following places:

- Zwola, Garwolin County in Masovian Voivodeship (east-central Poland)
- Zwola, Kozienice County in Masovian Voivodeship (east-central Poland)
- Zwola, Świętokrzyskie Voivodeship (south-central Poland)
- Zwola, Greater Poland Voivodeship (west-central Poland)
