= Porudzie =

- Village
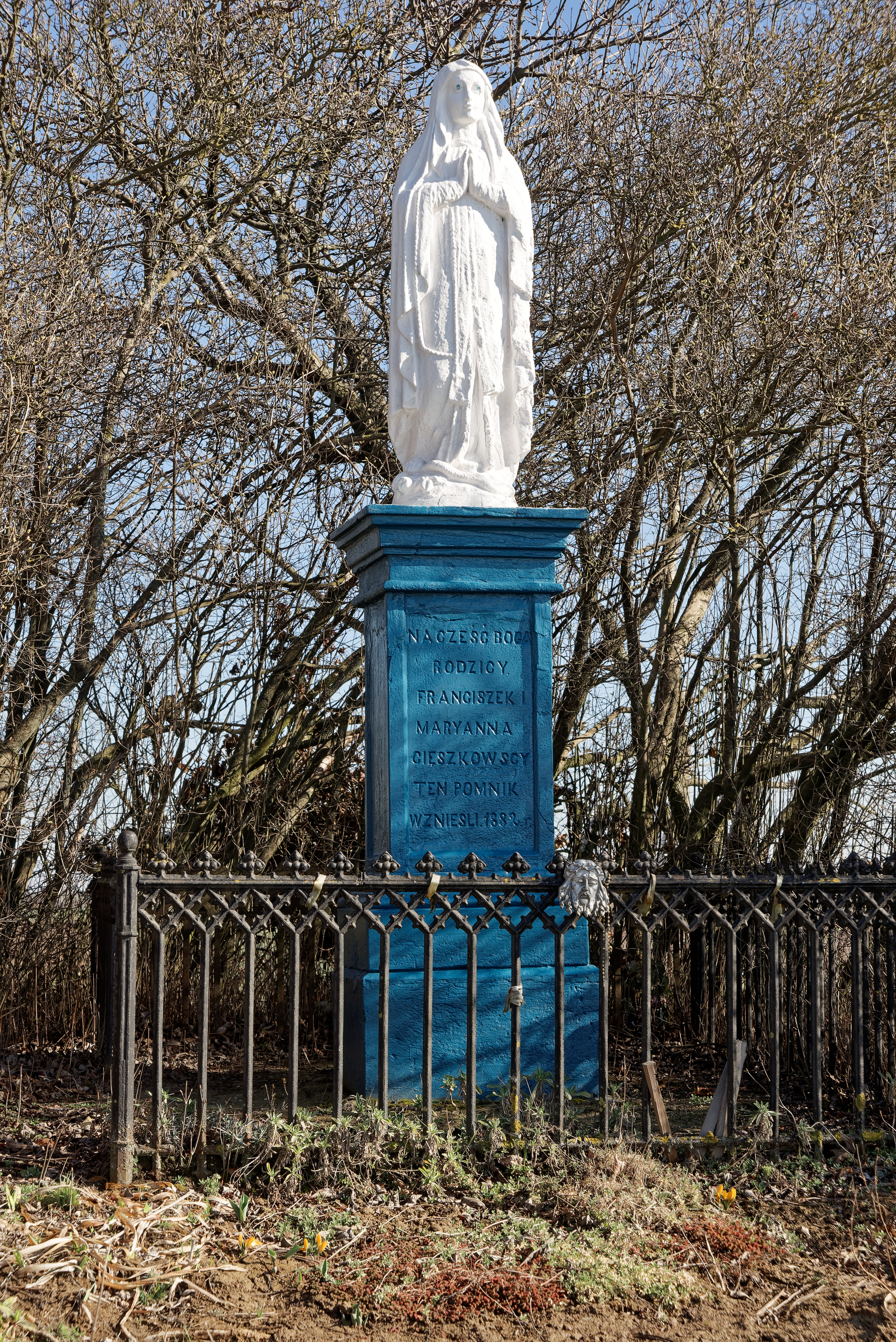

- Location within Poland
- Coordinates: 50°49′41″N 21°23′18″E
- Country: Poland
- Voivodeship: Świętokrzyskie
- County: Opatów
- Gmina: Sadowie
- Population: 170

Porudzie [pɔˈrud͡ʑɛ] is a village in the administrative district of Gmina Sadowie, within Opatów County, Świętokrzyskie Voivodeship, in south-central Poland. It lies approximately 3 km (2 mi) south-east of Sadowie, 4 km (2 mi) north-west of Opatów, and 55 km (34 mi) east of the regional capital Kielce.
