= Okręglica, Świętokrzyskie Voivodeship =

Okręglica
- Village
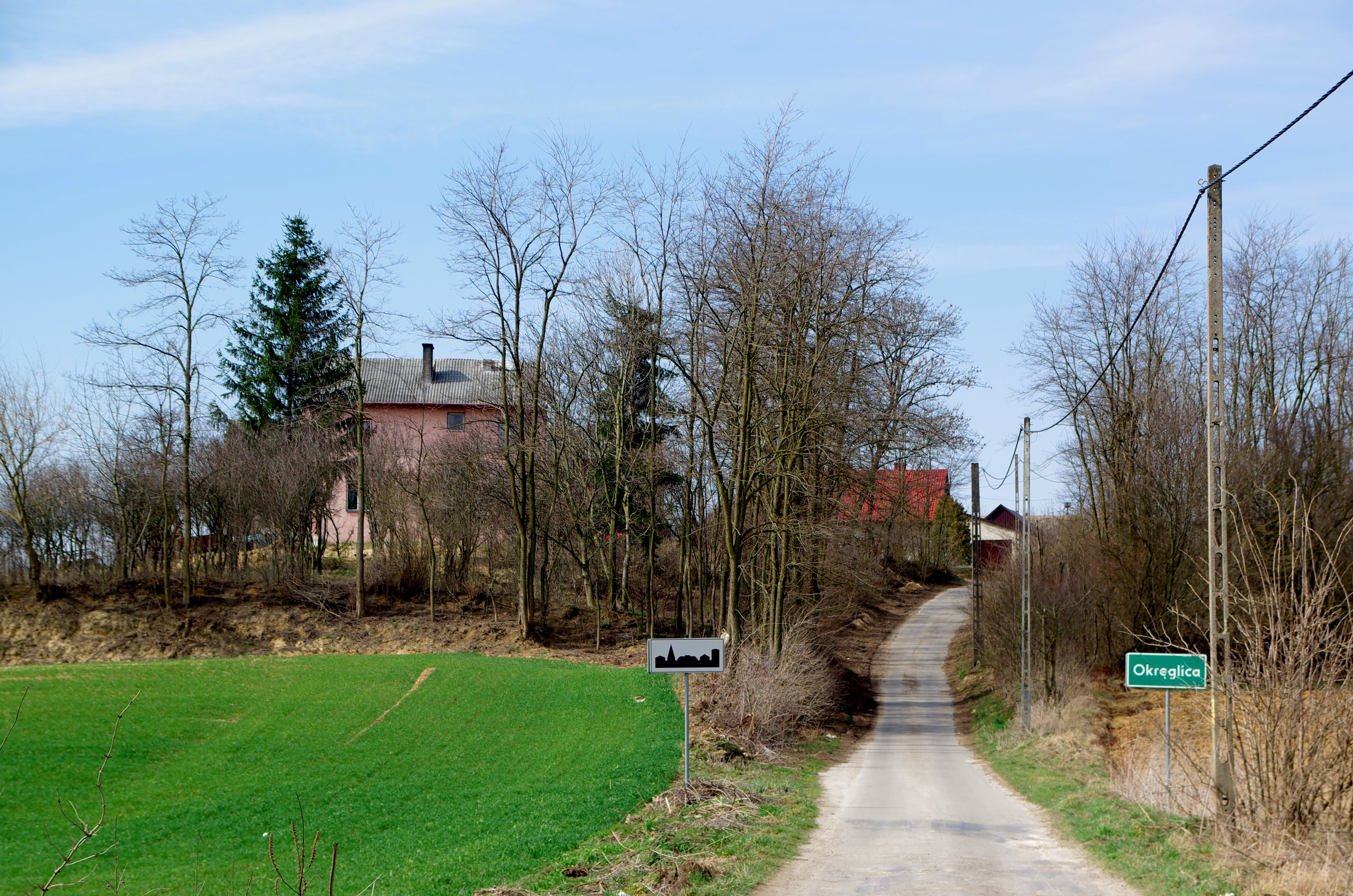

- Location within Poland
- Coordinates: 50°52′48″N 21°23′41″E
- Country: Poland
- Voivodeship: Świętokrzyskie
- County: Opatów
- Gmina: Sadowie

Okręglica [ɔkrɛŋˈɡlit͡sa] is a village in the administrative district of Gmina Sadowie, within Opatów County, Świętokrzyskie Voivodeship, in south-central Poland. It lies approximately 4 km (2 mi) north-east of Sadowie, 9 km (6 mi) north of Opatów, and 55 km (34 mi) east of the regional capital Kielce.
