= Obręczna =

- Village
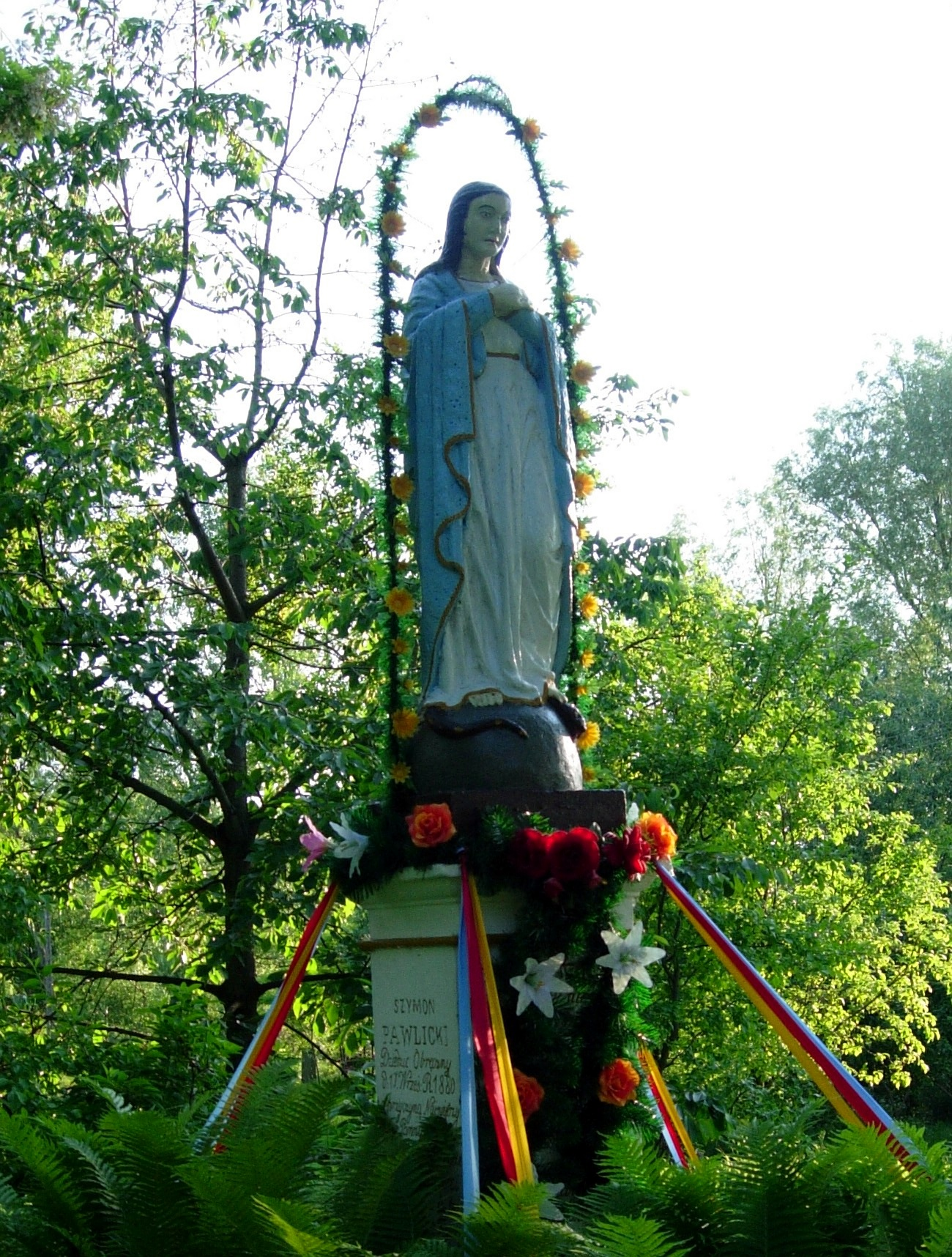

- Location within Poland
- Coordinates: 50°52′1″N 21°22′45″E
- Country: Poland
- Voivodeship: Świętokrzyskie
- County: Opatów
- Gmina: Sadowie
- Population: 290

Obręczna [ɔˈbrɛnt͡ʂna] is a village in the administrative district of Gmina Sadowie, within Opatów County, Świętokrzyskie Voivodeship, in south-central Poland. It lies approximately 2 km (1 mi) north of Sadowie, 8 km (5 mi) north-west of Opatów, and 54 km (34 mi) east of the regional capital Kielce.
