= Jacentów, Opatów County =

Jacentów
- Village
- Location within Poland
- Coordinates: 50°52′10″N 21°22′22″E
- Country: Poland
- Voivodeship: Świętokrzyskie
- County: Opatów
- Gmina: Sadowie

Jacentów [jaˈt͡sɛntuf] is a village in the administrative district of Gmina Sadowie, within Opatów County, Świętokrzyskie Voivodeship, in south-central Poland. It lies approximately 2 km (1 mi) north of Sadowie, 9 km (6 mi) north-west of Opatów, and 54 km (34 mi) east of the regional capital Kielce.
