= Truskolasy =

Truskolasy may refer to:

- Truskolasy, Silesian Voivodeship
- Truskolasy, Świętokrzyskie Voivodeship
