= Grocholice, Gmina Sadowie =

Grocholice
- Village
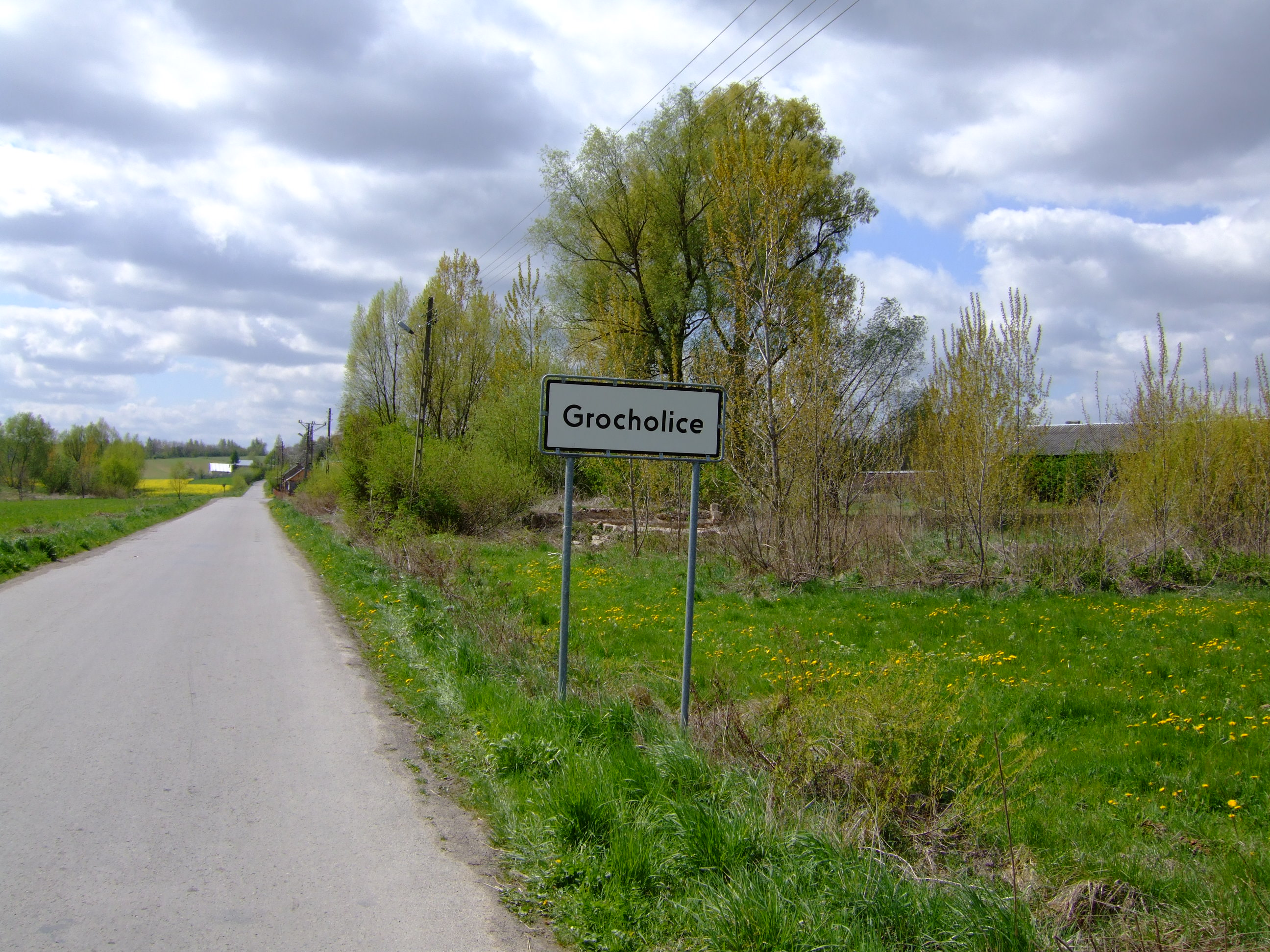

- Location within Poland
- Coordinates: 50°52′12″N 21°26′8″E
- Country: Poland
- Voivodeship: Świętokrzyskie
- County: Opatów
- Gmina: Sadowie
- Population: 180

Grocholice [ɡrɔxɔˈlit͡sɛ] is a village in the administrative district of Gmina Sadowie, within Opatów County, Świętokrzyskie Voivodeship, in south-central Poland. It lies approximately 6 km (4 mi) north-east of Sadowie, 8 km (5 mi) north of Opatów, and 58 km (36 mi) east of the regional capital Kielce.
