= Ruszkowiec =

- Village
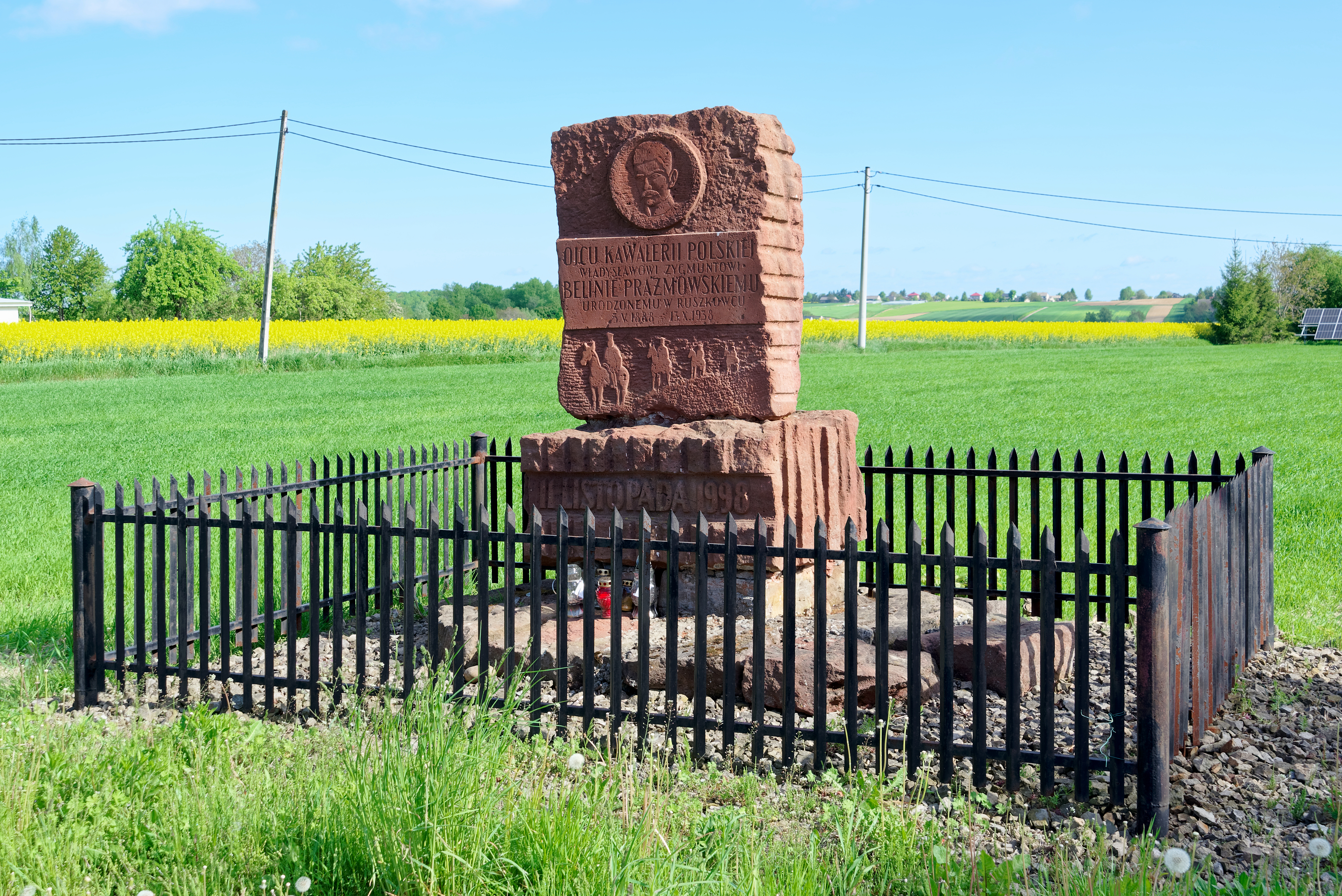

- Location within Poland
- Coordinates: 50°51′N 21°21′E
- Country: Poland
- Voivodeship: Świętokrzyskie
- County: Opatów
- Gmina: Sadowie

Ruszkowiec [ruʂˈkɔvjɛt͡s] is a village in the administrative district of Gmina Sadowie, within Opatów County, Świętokrzyskie Voivodeship, in south-central Poland. It lies approximately 2 km (1 mi) west of Sadowie, 8 km (5 mi) north-west of Opatów, and 52 km (32 mi) east of the regional capital Kielce.
