= Ruszków, Świętokrzyskie Voivodeship =

Ruszków
- Village
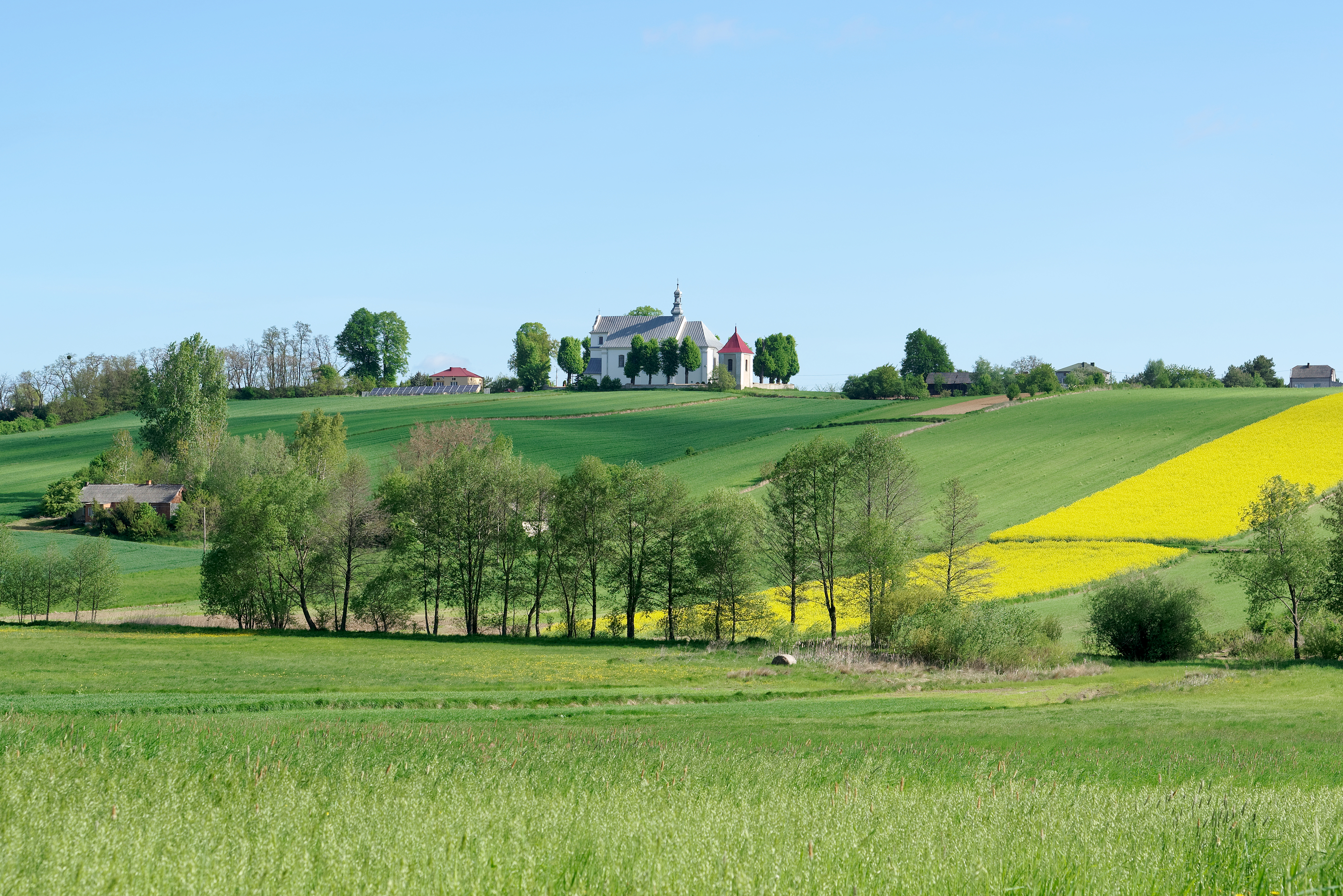

- Location within Poland
- Coordinates: 50°51′44″N 21°20′39″E
- Country: Poland
- Voivodeship: Świętokrzyskie
- County: Opatów
- Gmina: Sadowie

Population
  - Total: 250

Ruszków [ˈruʂkuf] is a village in the administrative district of Gmina Sadowie, within Opatów County, Świętokrzyskie Voivodeship, in south-central Poland. It lies approximately 3 km (2 mi) north-west of Sadowie, 9 km (6 mi) north-west of Opatów, and 52 km (32 mi) east of the regional capital Kielce.

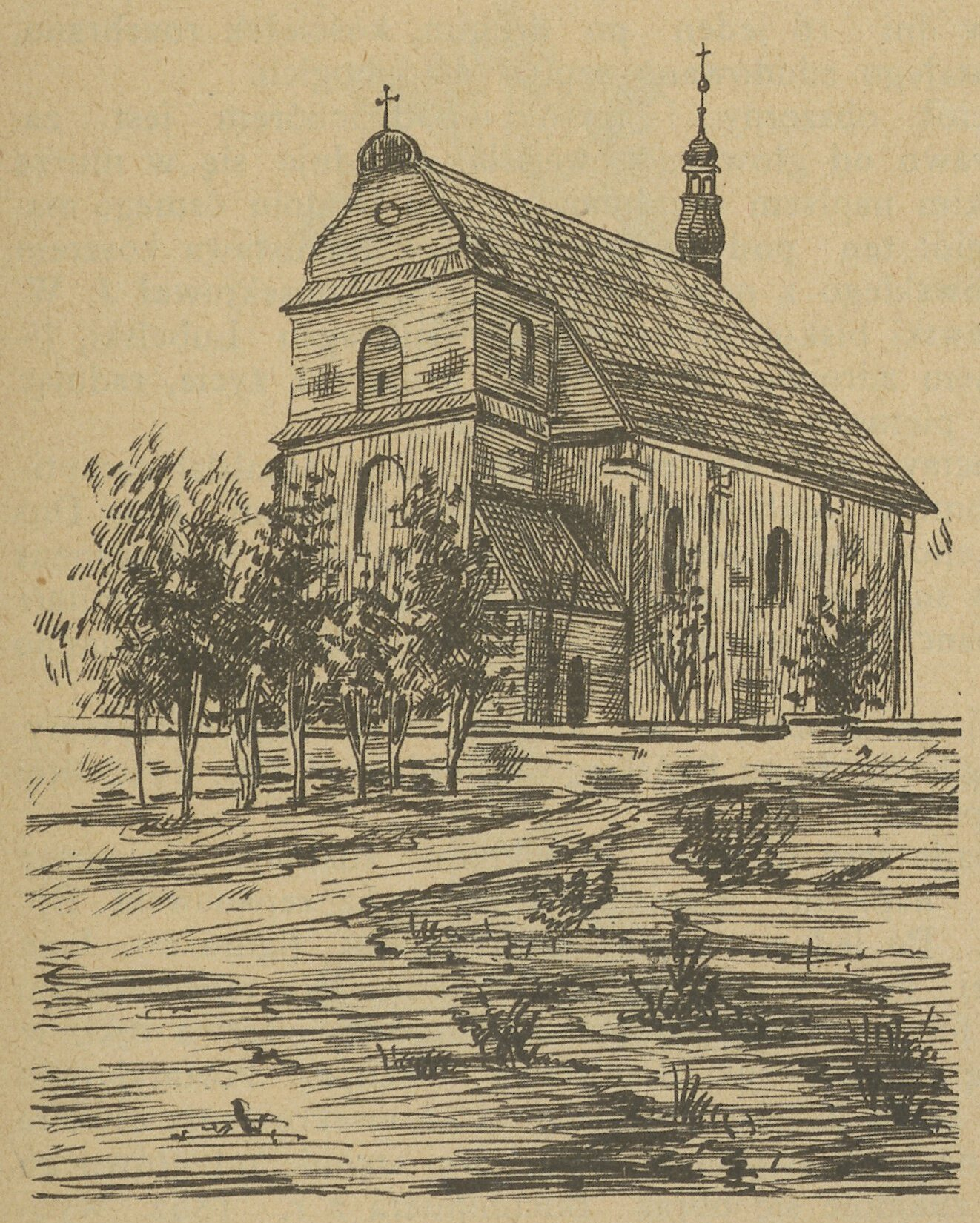
Church of Saint Stanislaus before 1907
