= Czerwona Góra, Świętokrzyskie Voivodeship =

Czerwona Góra
- Village
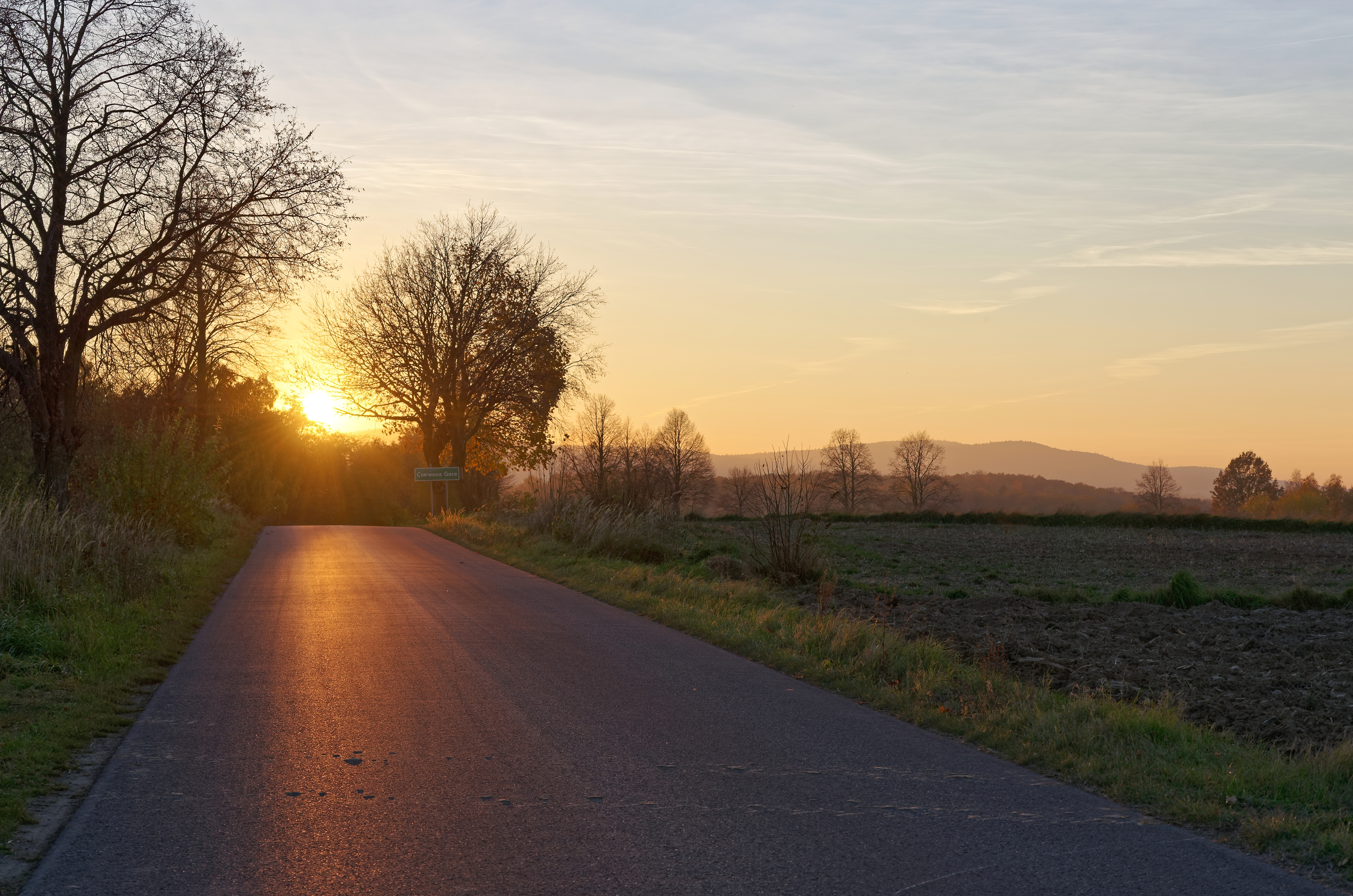

- Location within Poland
- Coordinates: 50°50′52″N 21°18′31″E
- Country: Poland
- Voivodeship: Świętokrzyskie
- County: Opatów
- Gmina: Sadowie
- Population: 190

Czerwona Góra [t͡ʂɛrˈvɔna ˈɡura] is a village in the administrative district of Gmina Sadowie, within Opatów County, Świętokrzyskie Voivodeship, in south-central Poland. It lies approximately 5 km (3 mi) west of Sadowie, 10 km (6 mi) north-west of Opatów, and 49 km (30 mi) east of the regional capital Kielce.
