= Niemienice, Świętokrzyskie Voivodeship =

Niemienice
- Village
- Location within Poland
- Coordinates: 50°49′51″N 21°19′33″E
- Country: Poland
- Voivodeship: Świętokrzyskie
- County: Opatów
- Gmina: Sadowie
- Population: 290

Niemienice [ɲɛmjɛˈnit͡sɛ] is a village in the administrative district of Gmina Sadowie, within Opatów County, Świętokrzyskie Voivodeship, in south-central Poland. It lies approximately 4 km (2 mi) south-west of Sadowie, 8 km (5 mi) west of Opatów, and 51 km (32 mi) east of the regional capital Kielce.
