= Małoszyce, Świętokrzyskie Voivodeship =

Małoszyce
- Village
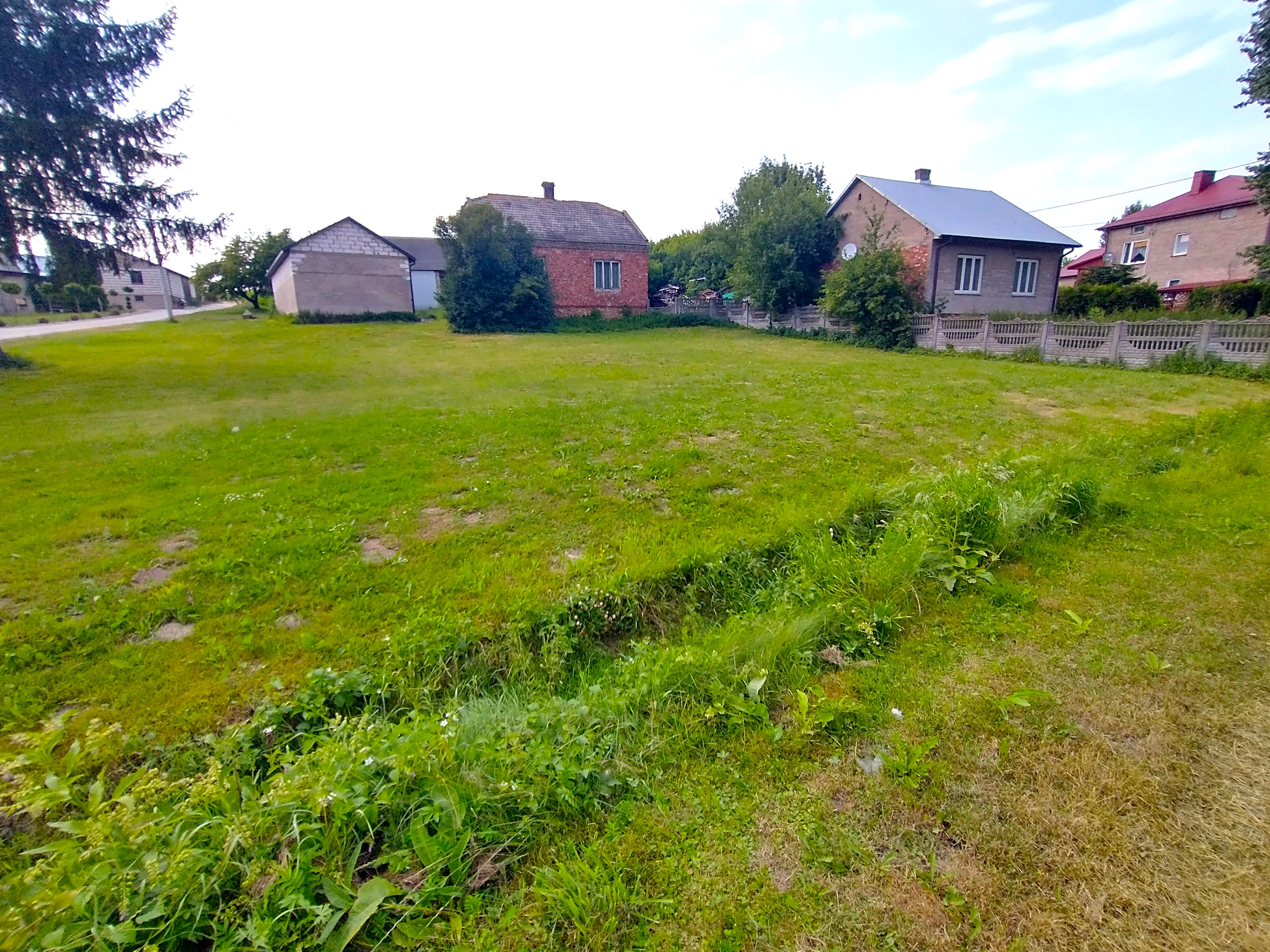

- Location within Poland
- Coordinates: 50°51′15″N 21°27′3″E
- Country: Poland
- Voivodeship: Świętokrzyskie
- County: Opatów
- Gmina: Sadowie
- Population: 90

Małoszyce [mawɔˈʂɨt͡sɛ] is a village in the administrative district of Gmina Sadowie, within Opatów County, Świętokrzyskie Voivodeship, in south-central Poland. It lies approximately 6 km (4 mi) east of Sadowie, 6 km (4 mi) north of Opatów, and 59 km (37 mi) east of the regional capital Kielce.

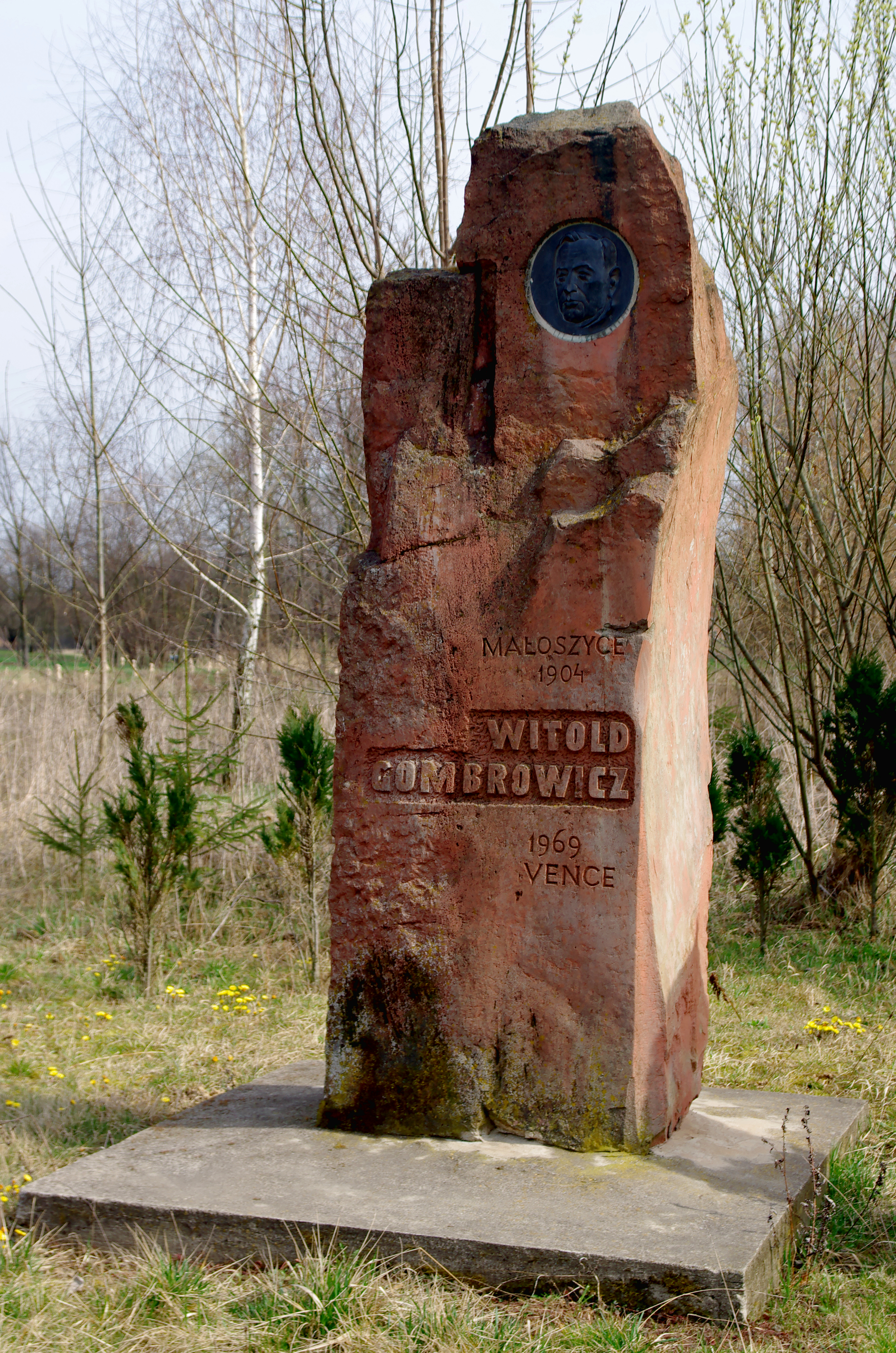
Monument to Witold Gombrowicz

Małoszyce is the birthplace of writer Witold Gombrowicz (1904–1969).
