= Biskupice, Opatów County =

Biskupice
- Village
- Location within Poland
- Coordinates: 50°49′29″N 21°18′57″E
- Country: Poland
- Voivodeship: Świętokrzyskie
- County: Opatów
- Gmina: Sadowie
- Population: 250

Biskupice [biskuˈpit͡sɛ] is a village in the administrative district of Gmina Sadowie, within Opatów County, Świętokrzyskie Voivodeship, in south-central Poland. It lies approximately 5 km (3 mi) south-west of Sadowie, 8 km (5 mi) west of Opatów, and 50 km (31 mi) east of the regional capital Kielce.
