= Wszechświęte =

Wszechświęte may refer to the following places in Poland:

- Wszechświęte, Lower Silesian Voivodeship (south-west Poland)
- Wszechświęte, Świętokrzyskie Voivodeship (south-central Poland)
