= The Marriage (Gombrowicz play) =

Play written by Witold Gombrowicz

- Original language: Polish
- Written by: Witold Gombrowicz

Premiere
- Date: 1960
- Place: Gliwice, Poland

The Marriage (Polish: Ślub) is a play by the Polish writer Witold Gombrowicz, written in Argentina after World War II. The narrative takes place in a dream, where the dreamer transforms into a king and plans to marry his fiancée in a royal wedding, only as a means to save their integrity. A Spanish translation was first published in 1948, followed by the original Polish version in 1953. The play was first performed in 1960.

== Plot ==
Henryk has a dream where his childhood home has been turned into an inn. His father is the innkeeper and his fiancée, Mania, is a serving maid. Drunkards begin to cause trouble and pursue the father. The father, to defend his dignity, claims that he is untouchable, "like a king". This would make Henryk a prince. Henryk is then promised a marriage with Mania, a marriage worthy of a royal in order to restore her purity.

As the marriage is prepared—it will be celebrated by none other than a bishop—Henryk begins to have doubts about the validity of the dream. The drunkard enters and is about to fight Henryk when the scene changes into a court banquet. The drunkard is now an ambassador of a hostile nation. The drunkard makes Henryk's friend Władzio hold a flower over Mania's head. He then makes the flower disappear, leaving the two in an improper position, to Henryk's indignation.

Henryk becomes a dictator who rules over the whole world. The marriage is still in preparation. Henryk is worried since he has doubts whether his power has any meaning when he is omnipotent. He therefore asks Władzio to sacrifice himself, as a way to confirm his power, and also to satisfy his jealousy. Władzio agrees and goes on to kill himself. Henryk regrets what he has done, and the marriage is cancelled.

== Background ==
Witold Gombrowicz lived in Argentina from 1939 to 1963. He began to write The Marriage in August 1946 and it was finished in September the following year. It was first published in a Spanish translation in 1948, and in its original Polish version in 1953, together with the novel Trans-Atlantyk. An English translation was published by Grove Press in 1969.

== Production history ==
The Marriage was first performed in Gliwice, Poland in 1960, under the direction of Jerzy Jarocki. The production was stopped by the censors after four performances. In 1963, the French director Jorge Lavelli staged the play at the Théâtre Récamier in Paris, to critical success. The Royal Dramatic Theatre in Stockholm performed the play in 1966, with Alf Sjöberg as director and Ernst-Hugo Järegård in a role. The first full-scale Polish production was directed by Jarocki in 1974 for the Teatr Dramatyczny in Warsaw.

== Opera ==
Volker David Kirchner composed an opera based on the play, Die Trauung, which premiered on 27 April 1975 at the Hessisches Staatstheater Wiesbaden, conducted by Siegfried Köhler.
