= Łężyce =

Łężyce may refer to the following places in Poland:

- Łężyce, Lower Silesian Voivodeship (south-west Poland)
- Łężyce, Świętokrzyskie Voivodeship (south-central Poland)
- Łężyce, Pomeranian Voivodeship (north Poland)
