= Szczucice =

- Village
- Location within Poland
- Coordinates: 50°51′23″N 21°24′14″E
- Country: Poland
- Voivodeship: Świętokrzyskie
- County: Opatów
- Gmina: Sadowie
- Population: 110

Szczucice [ʂt͡ʂuˈt͡ɕit͡sɛ] is a village in the administrative district of Gmina Sadowie, within Opatów County, Świętokrzyskie Voivodeship, in south-central Poland. It lies approximately 3 km (2 mi) east of Sadowie, 6 km (4 mi) north of Opatów, and 56 km (35 mi) east of the regional capital Kielce.
