= Bogusławice, Świętokrzyskie Voivodeship =

Bogusławice
- Village
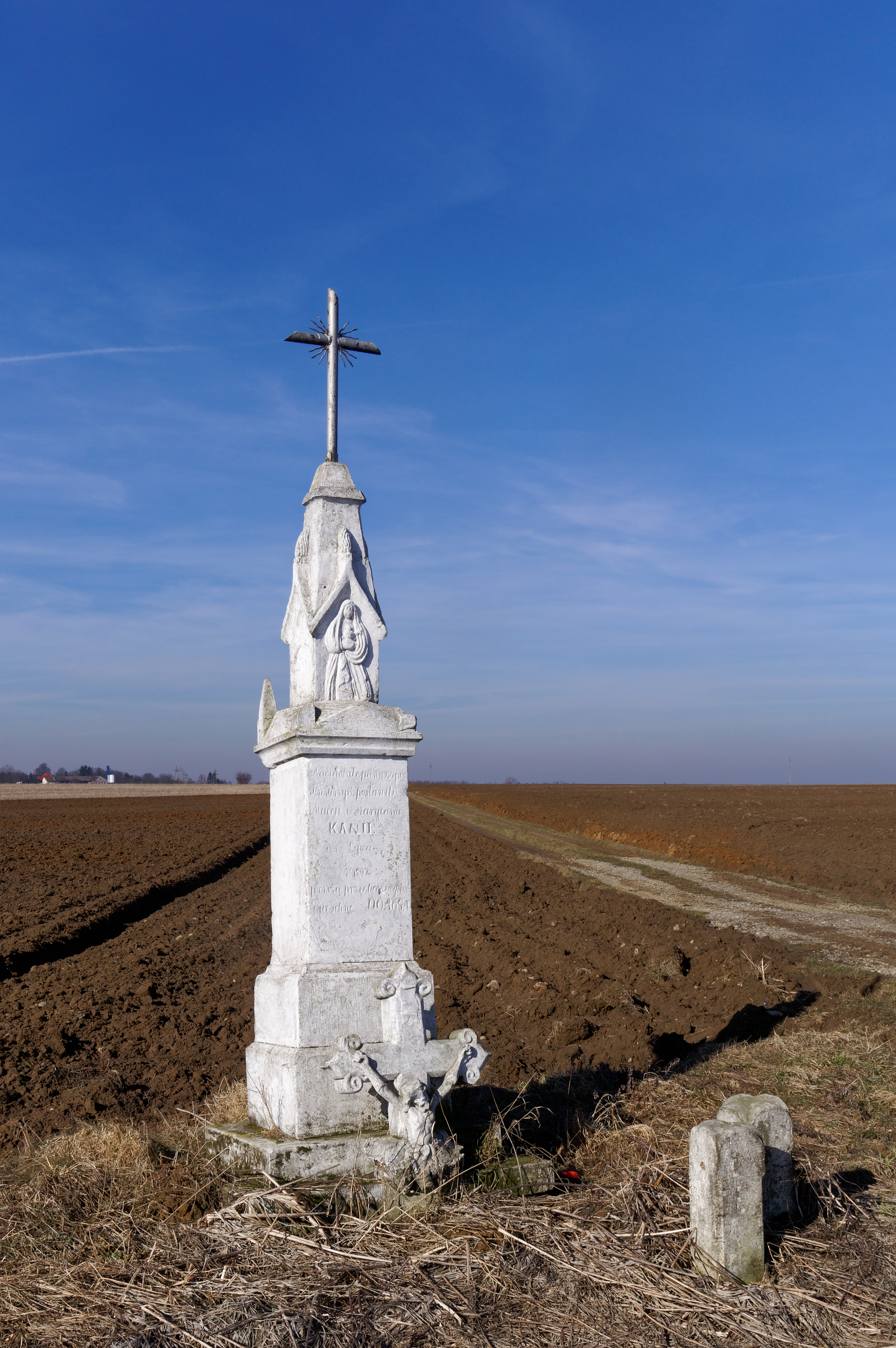

- Location within Poland
- Coordinates: 50°50′25″N 21°25′6″E
- Country: Poland
- Voivodeship: Świętokrzyskie
- County: Opatów
- Gmina: Sadowie
- Population: 270

Bogusławice [bɔɡuswaˈvit͡sɛ] is a village in the administrative district of Gmina Sadowie, within Opatów County, Świętokrzyskie Voivodeship, in south-central Poland. It lies approximately 4 km (2 mi) east of Sadowie, 4 km (2 mi) north of Opatów, and 57 km (35 mi) east of the regional capital Kielce.
