= Rzuchow =

Rzuchow may refer to the following places:

- Rzuchów, Greater Poland Voivodeship (west-central Poland)
- Rzuchów, Silesian Voivodeship (south Poland)
- Rzuchów, Subcarpathian Voivodeship (south-east Poland)
- Rzuchów, Świętokrzyskie Voivodeship(south-central Poland)
