= Michałów, Opatów County =

Michałów
- Village
- Location within Poland
- Coordinates: 50°49′32″N 21°17′54″E
- Country: Poland
- Voivodeship: Świętokrzyskie
- County: Opatów
- Gmina: Sadowie
- Population: 90

Michałów [miˈxawuf] is a village in the administrative district of Gmina Sadowie, within Opatów County, Świętokrzyskie Voivodeship, in south-central Poland. It lies approximately 6 km (4 mi) south-west of Sadowie, 10 km (6 mi) west of Opatów, and 49 km (30 mi) east of the regional capital Kielce.
