= Zochcin =

- Village
- Location within Poland
- Coordinates: 50°49′32″N 21°22′31″E
- Country: Poland
- Voivodeship: Świętokrzyskie
- County: Opatów
- Gmina: Sadowie
- Population: 230

Zochcin [ˈzɔxt͡ɕin] is a village in the administrative district of Gmina Sadowie, within Opatów County, Świętokrzyskie Voivodeship, in south-central Poland. It lies approximately 3 km (2 mi) south of Sadowie, 5 km (3 mi) north-west of Opatów, and 54 km (34 mi) east of the regional capital Kielce.
