= Witold Gombrowicz =

Polish writer (1904–1969)

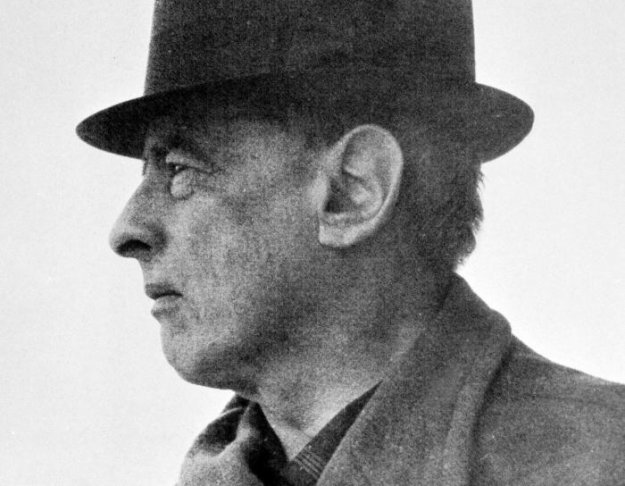
- Born: Witold Marian Gombrowicz; August 4, 1904; Małoszyce, Radom Governorate, Congress Poland, Russian Empire
- Died: July 24, 1969 (aged 64); Vence, France
- Education: University of Warsaw (MJur, 1927)
- Occupations: Novelist, dramatist, diarist
- Writing career
- Language: Polish
- Notable works: Ferdydurke; Trans-Atlantyk; Kosmos; Pornografia; The Marriage
- Website: witoldgombrowicz.com

Witold Marian Gombrowicz (August 4, 1904 – July 24, 1969) was a Polish writer and playwright. His works are characterised by deep psychological analysis, a certain sense of paradox and absurd, anti-nationalist flavor. In 1937, he published his first novel, Ferdydurke, which presented many of his usual themes: problems of immaturity and youth, creation of identity in interactions with others, and an ironic, critical examination of class roles in Polish society and culture.

He gained fame only during the last years of his life, but is now considered one of the foremost figures of Polish literature. His diaries were published in 1969 and are, according to the Paris Review, "widely considered his masterpiece", while Cosmos is considered, according to The New Yorker, "his most accomplished novel". He was nominated for the Nobel Prize in Literature four times, from 1966 to 1969.

== Biography ==
=== Polish years ===
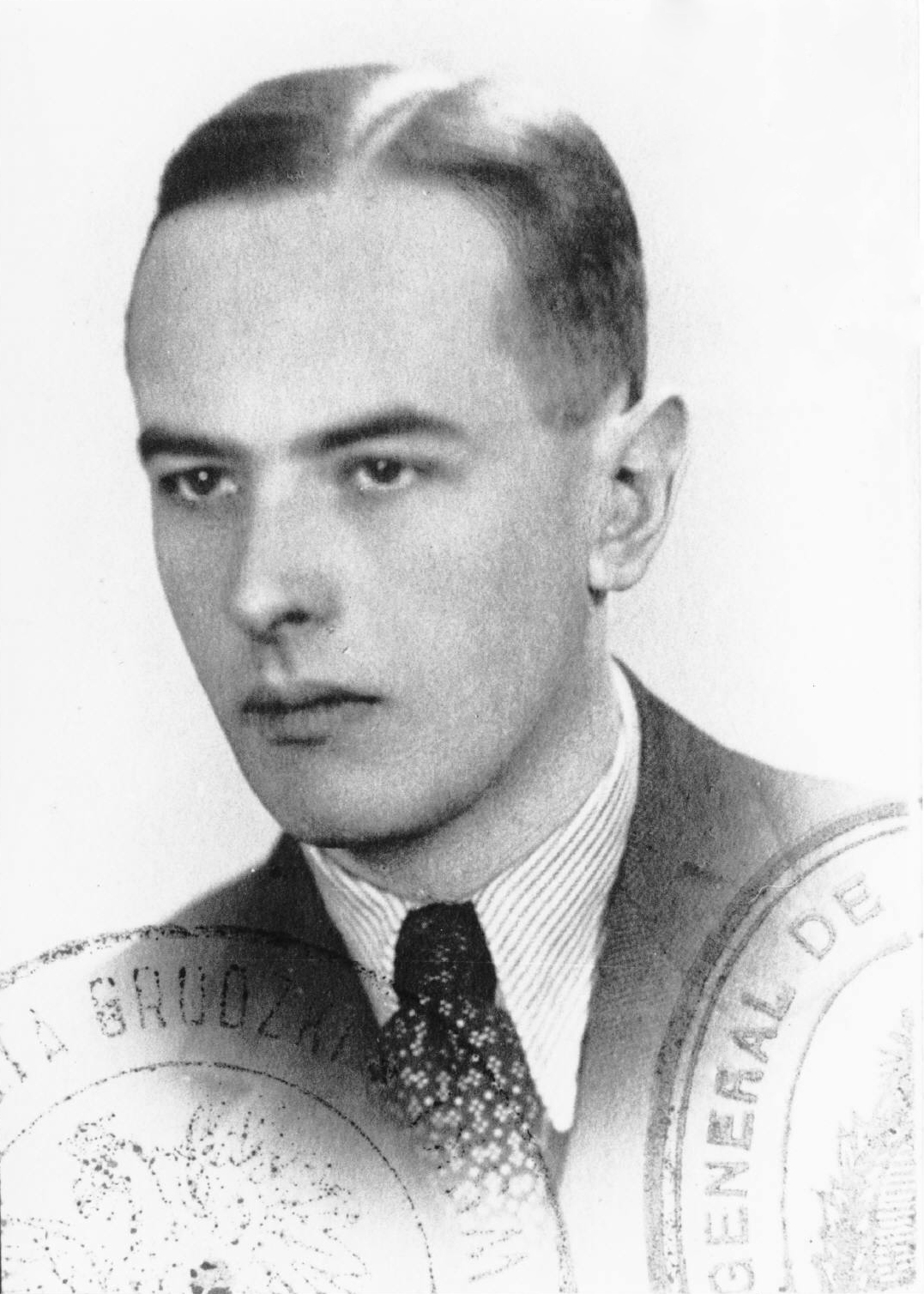
Passport photo, 1939

Gombrowicz was born in Małoszyce near Opatów, then in Radom Governorate, Congress Poland, Russian Empire, to a wealthy gentry family of the Kościesza coat of arms. He was the youngest of four children of Jan Onufry and Antonina (née Ścibor-Kotkowska of the Ostoja coat of arms). In an autobiographical piece, A Kind of Testament, he wrote that his family had lived for 400 years in Lithuania on an estate between Vilnius and Kaunas but were displaced after his grandfather was accused of participating in the January Uprising of 1863. He later described his family origins and social status as early instances of a lifelong sense of being "between" (entre). In 1911 his family moved to Warsaw. After completing his education at Saint Stanislaus Kostka's Gymnasium in 1922, Gombrowicz studied law at Warsaw University, earning a MJur in 1927. He spent a year in Paris, where he studied at the Institute of Higher International Studies (French: Institut des Hautes Etudes Internationales). He was less than diligent in his studies, but his time in France brought him in constant contact with other young intellectuals. He also visited the Mediterranean.

When Gombrowicz returned to Poland, he began applying for legal positions with little success. In the 1920s he started writing. He soon rejected the legendary novel, whose form and subject matter were supposed to manifest his "worse" and darker side of nature. Similarly, his attempt to write a popular novel in collaboration with Tadeusz Kępiński was a failure. At the turn of the 1920s and 1930s, Gombrowicz began to write short stories, later printed under the title Memoirs of a Time of Immaturity, edited by Gombrowicz and published under the name Bacacay, the street where he lived during his exile in Argentina. From the moment of this literary debut, his reviews and columns began appearing in the press, mainly the Kurier Poranny (Morning Courier). Gombrowicz met with other young writers and intellectuals, forming an artistic café society in Zodiak and Ziemiańska, both in Warsaw. The publication of Ferdydurke, his first novel, brought him acclaim in literary circles.

=== Exile in Argentina ===
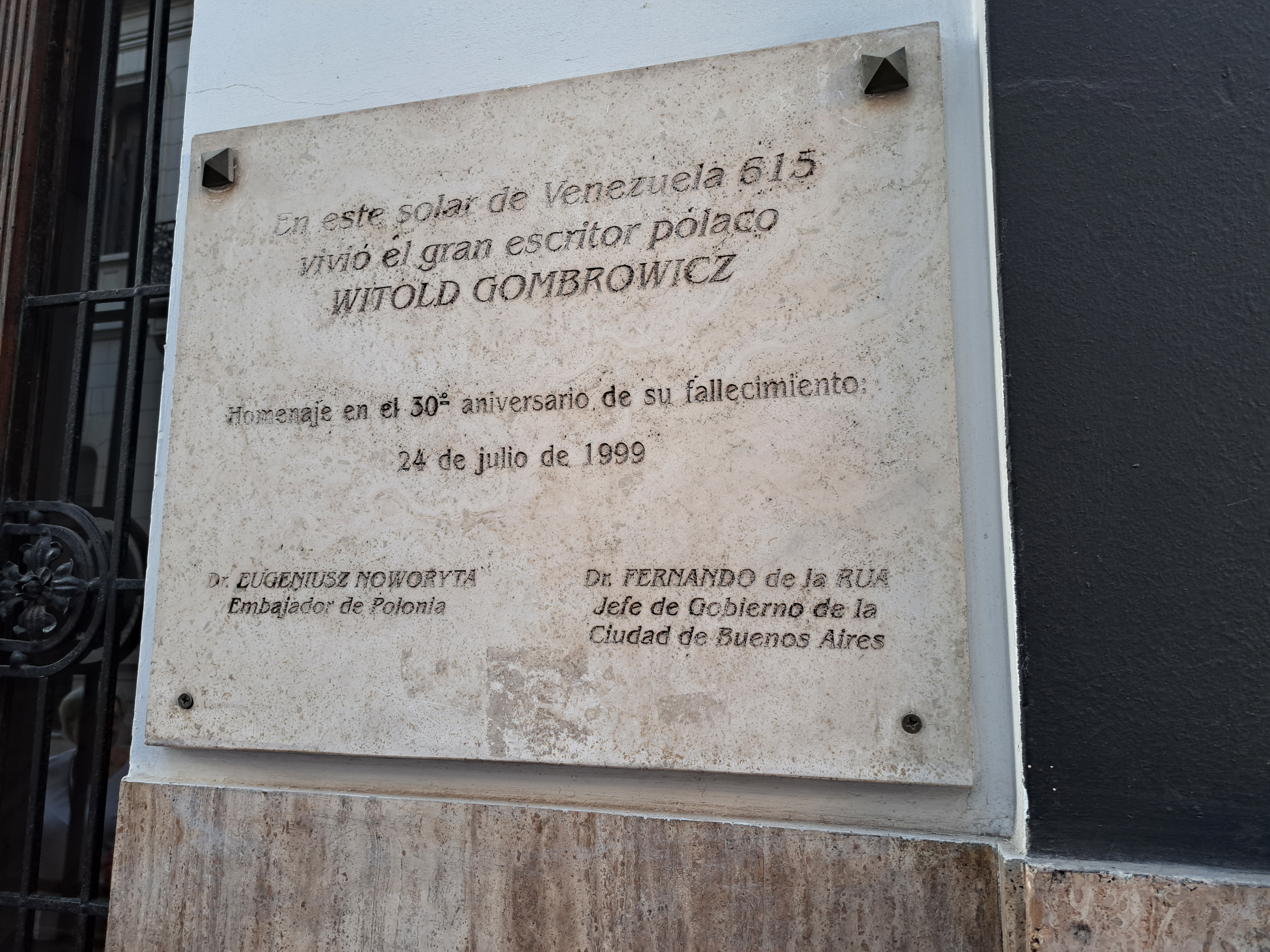
Commemorative plaque on the building located on Calle Venezuela 615, where Gombrowicz lived

Just before the outbreak of the Second World War, Gombrowicz took part in the maiden voyage of the Polish transatlantic liner MS Chrobry to South America. When he learned of the outbreak of war in Europe, he decided to wait in Buenos Aires until it was over; he reported to the Polish legation in 1941 but was considered unfit for military duties. He stayed in Argentina until 1963—often, especially during the war, in poverty.

At the end of the 1940s Gombrowicz was trying to gain a position in Argentine literary circles by publishing articles, giving lectures at the Fray Mocho café, and, finally, by publishing in 1947 a Spanish translation of Ferdydurke, with the help of friends including Virgilio Piñera. This version of the novel is now considered a significant event in the history of Argentine literature, but at the time of its publication it did not bring Gombrowicz any great renown, nor did the 1948 publication of his drama Ślub in Spanish (The Marriage, El Casamiento). From December 1947 to May 1955 Gombrowicz worked as a bank clerk in Banco Polaco, the Argentine branch of Bank Pekao, and formed a friendship with Zofia Chądzyńska, who introduced him to Buenos Aires's political and cultural elite. In 1950 he started exchanging letters with Jerzy Giedroyc, and in 1951 he began to publish work in the Parisian journal Culture, in which fragments of Dziennik (Diaries) appeared in 1953. In the same year he published a volume of work that included Ślub and the novel Trans-Atlantyk, in which the subject of national identity on emigration was controversially raised. After October 1956 four of Gombrowicz's books appeared in Poland and brought him great renown, even though the authorities did not allow the publication of Dziennik (Diary).

Gombrowicz had affairs with both men and women. In his later serialised Diary (1953–69) he wrote about his adventures in the homosexual underworld of Buenos Aires, particularly his experiences with young men from the lower class, a theme he picked up again when interviewed by Dominique de Roux in A Kind of Testament (1973).

=== Last years in Europe ===
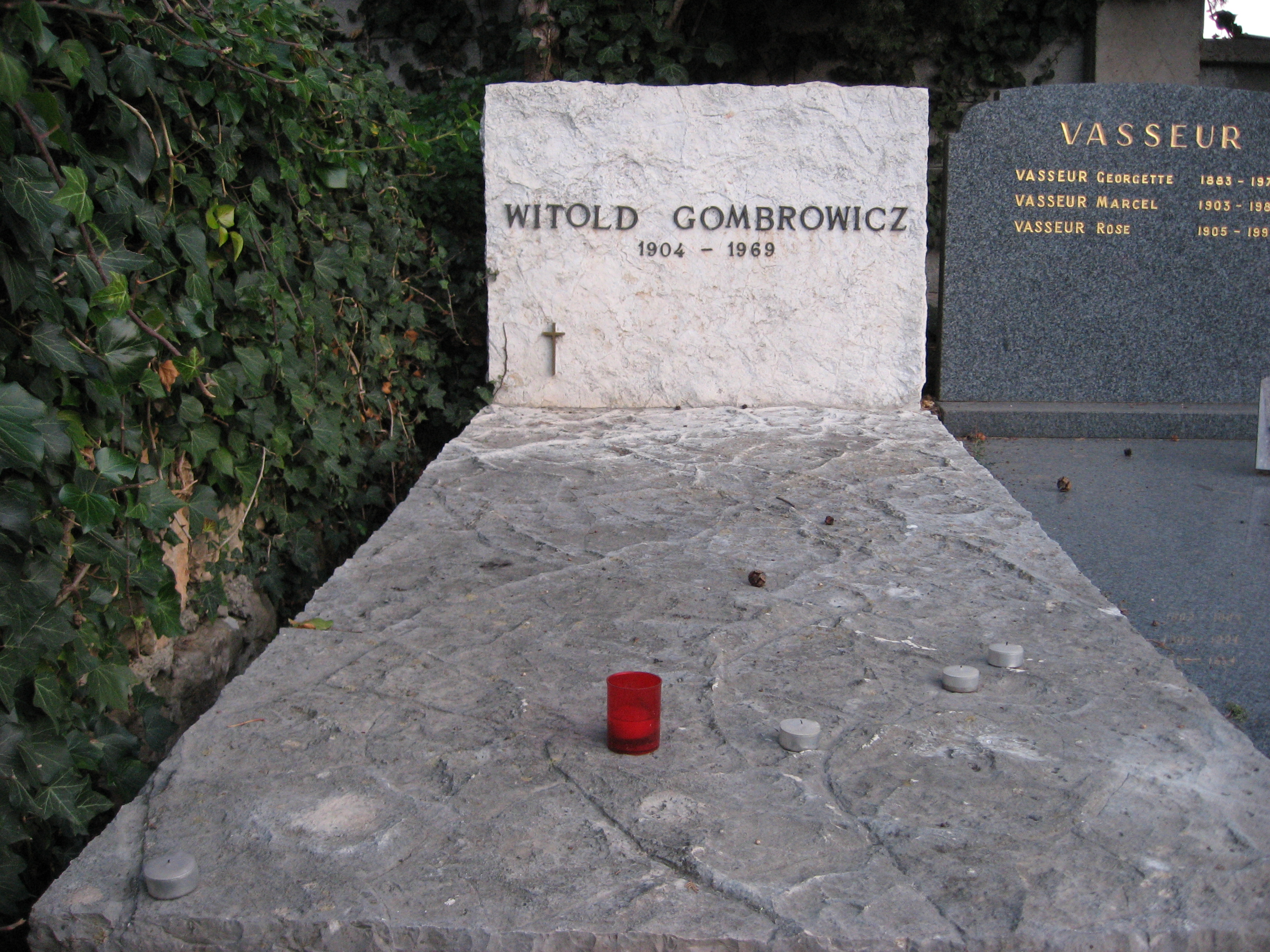
Gombrowicz's grave in Vence

In the 1960s Gombrowicz became recognised globally, and many of his works were translated, including Pornografia (Pornography) and Kosmos (Cosmos). His dramas were staged in theatres around the world, especially in France, Germany and Sweden.

Having received a scholarship from the Ford Foundation, Gombrowicz returned to Europe in 1963. In April 1963 he embarked on an Italian ship, landing at Cannes and then taking a train to Paris. A record of the journey can be found in his diary. Gombrowicz stayed for a year in West Berlin, where he endured a slanderous campaign organised by the Polish authorities. His health deteriorated during this stay, and he was unable to return to Argentina. He went back to France in 1964 and spent three months in Royaumont Abbey, near Paris, where he met Rita Labrosse, a Canadian from Montreal who studied contemporary literature. In 1964 he moved to the Côte d'Azur in the south of France with Labrosse, whom he employed as his secretary. He spent the rest of his life in Vence, near Nice.

Gombrowicz's health prevented him from thoroughly benefiting from his late renown. It worsened notably in spring 1964; he became bedridden and was unable to write. In May 1967 he was awarded the Prix International. The following year, on December 28, he married Labrosse. On the initiative of his friend Dominique de Roux, who hoped to cheer him up, he gave a series of 13 lectures on the history of philosophy to de Roux and Labrosse, ironically titled "Guide to Philosophy in Six Hours and Fifteen Minutes", which de Roux transcribed. The lectures began with Kant and ended with existentialism. The series ended before Gombrowicz could deliver the last part, interrupted by his death on July 24, 1969. He was buried in the cemetery in Vence.

== Writing ==
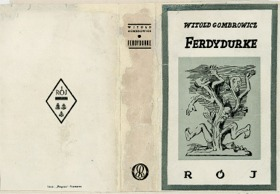
Cover of 1938 edition of Ferdydurke

Gombrowicz wrote in Polish, but he did not allow his works to be published in Poland until the authorities lifted the ban on the unabridged version of Dziennik, his diary, in which he described their attacks on him. Because he refused publication in Poland, he remained largely unknown to the general reading public until the first half of the 1970s. Still, his works were printed in Polish by the Paris Literary Institute of Jerzy Giedroyć and translated into more than 30 languages. Moreover, his dramas were repeatedly staged around the world by prominent directors such as Jorge Lavelli, Alf Sjöberg, Ingmar Bergman, and Jerzy Jarocki and Jerzy Grzegorzewski in Poland.

The salient characteristics of Gombrowicz's writing include incisive descriptions of characters' psychological entanglement with others, an acute awareness of conflicts that arise when traditional cultural values clash with contemporary values, and an exasperated yet comedic sense of the absurd. Gombrowicz's clear and precise descriptions criticise Polish Romanticism, and he once claimed he wrote in defiance of Adam Mickiewicz (especially in Trans-Atlantic). Gombrowicz's work has links with existentialism and structuralism. It is also known for its playful allusions and satire, as in a section of Trans-Atlantic written in the form of a stylised 19th-century diary, followed by a parody of a traditional fable.

For many critics and theorists, the most engaging aspects of Gombrowicz's work are the connections with European thought in the second half of the 20th century, which link him with the intellectual heritage of Foucault, Barthes, Deleuze, Lacan, and Sartre. As Gombrowicz said, "Ferdydurke was published in 1937 before Sartre formulated his theory of the regard d'autrui. But it is owing to the popularization of Sartrean concepts that this aspect of my book has been better understood and assimilated."

Gombrowicz uses first-person narrative in his novels, except Opętani. The language includes many neologisms. Moreover, he created "keywords" that shed their symbolic light on the sense covered under the ironic form (e.g. gęba, pupa in Ferdydurke).

In the story "Pamiętnik z okresu dojrzewania" Gombrowicz engages in paradoxes that control the entrance of the individual into the social world and the repressed passions that rule human behaviour. In Ferdydurke he discusses form as a universal category that is understood in philosophical, sociological, and aesthetic senses, and is a means of enslavement of the individual by other people and society as a whole. Certain turns of phrase in the novel became common usage in Polish, such as upupienie (imposing on the individual the role of somebody inferior and immature) and gęba (a personality or an authentic role imposed on somebody). Ferdydurke can be read as a satire of various Polish communities: progressive bourgeoisie, rustic, conservative. The satire presents the human either as a member of a society or an individual who struggles with himself and the world.

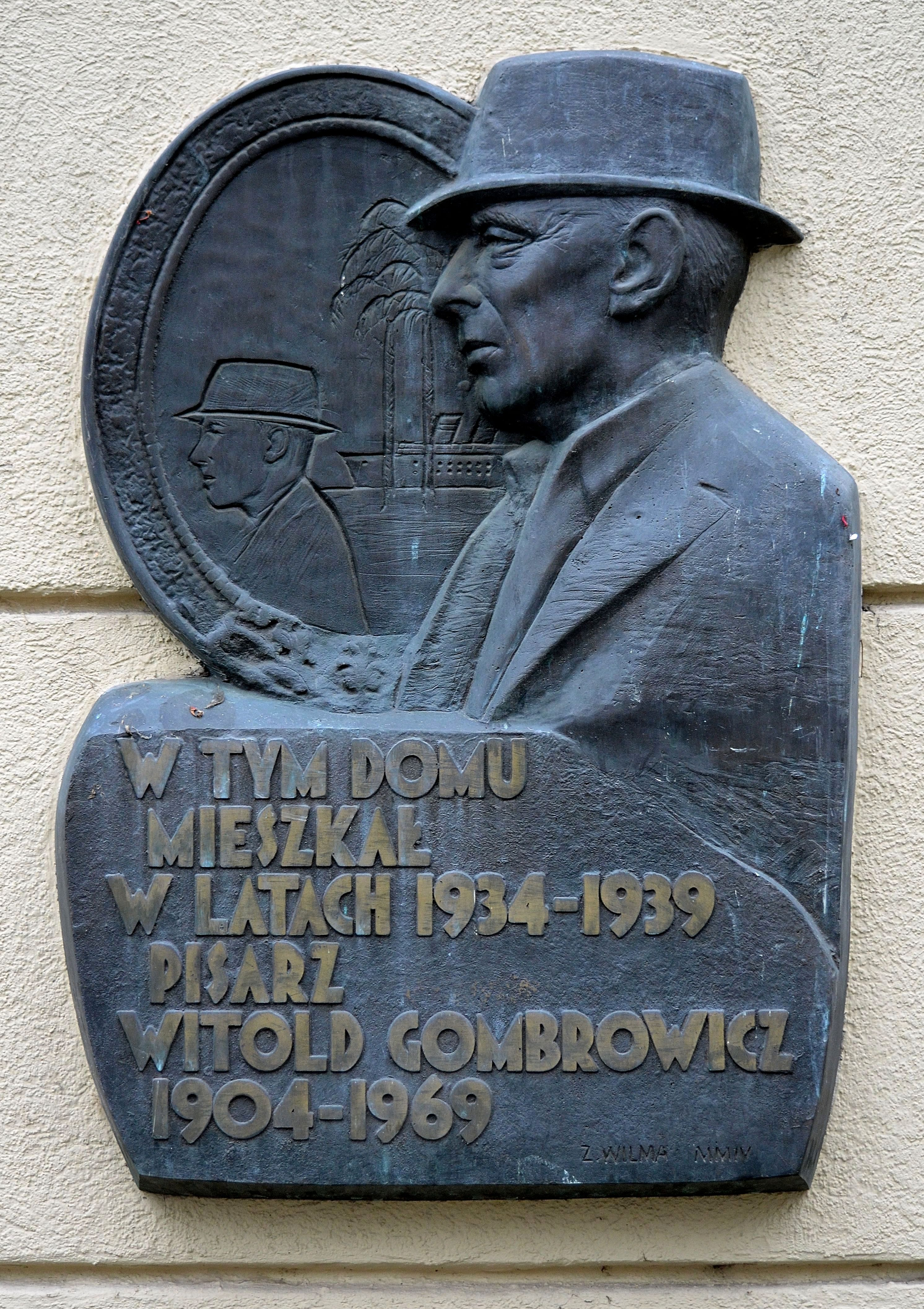
Memorial plaque at the Gombrowicz's Warsaw home (1935–39)

Adaptations of Ferdydurke and other works of Gombrowicz were presented by many theatres, especially before 1986, when the first nine volumes of his works were published. It was the only official way to gain access to his work.

Gombrowicz's first dramatic text was Iwona, księżniczka Burgunda (Ivona, Princess of Burgundia, 1938), a tragicomedy. It describes what the enslavement of form, custom, and ceremony brings.

In 1939 he published in installments in two daily newspapers the popular novel Opętani, in which he interlaced the form of the Gothic novel with that of sensational modern romance.

In Ślub, written just after the war, Gombrowicz used the form of Shakespeare's and Calderón’s theatre. He also critically undertook the theme of the romantic theatre (Zygmunt Krasiński, Juliusz Słowacki) and portrayed a new concept of power and a human being created by other people.

In Trans-Atlantyk Gombrowicz juxtaposes the traditional vision of a human who serves values with a new vision according to which an individual frees oneself of this service and fulfills oneself. The representative of this model of humanity is the eccentric millionaire Gonzalo.

The novel Pornografia shows Poland in wartime, when the eternal order of traditional culture, based on faith in God, collapsed. In its place appears a new reality where the elderly and the young cooperate to realise their cruel fascinations streaked with eroticism.

Kosmos is Gombrowicz's most complex and ambiguous work. In it he portrays how human beings create a vision of the world, what forces, symbolic order, and passion take part in this process and how the novel form organises itself in the process of creating sense.

Operetka, Gombrowicz's last play, uses operetta form to grotesquely present 20th-century totalitarianism. At the same time, he expresses a tentative faith in rebirth through youth.

According to many scholars, his most outstanding work is Dziennik (Diaries), not only as a literary work but also philosophical: "The affectingly cool critic of European tradition, the diagnostician of the disease afflicting contemporary thought, the great artist and moralist. If I were to designate a worthy successor to the Joyful science of Nietzschean criticism and poetry in twentieth century literature, I would answer: Gombrowicz in his Diary" (Wojciech Karpiński). Dziennik was published in serial form in Kultura from 1953 to 1969. It is not only Gombrowicz's record of life but also a philosophical essay, polemic, collection of auto-reflection on folk poetry, views on politics, national culture, religion, tradition, and many other themes. He writes in ostensibly casual anecdotes and uses a wide range of literary devices.

Three of Gombrowicz's novels were adapted for film: Ferdydurke (1991) directed by Jerzy Skolimowski, Pornografia (2003) directed by Jan Jakub Kolski, and Cosmos (2015) directed by Andrzej Żuławski.

2004, the centenary of his birth, was declared the Year of Gombrowicz.

Gombrowicz's last extensive work, Kronos, was published in Poland by Wydawnictwo Literackie on May 23, 2013. From May 2024, a manuscript of the Kronos is presented at a permanent exhibition in the Palace of the Commonwealth in Warsaw.

== Style ==
Gombrowicz's works are characterised by deep psychological analysis, a certain sense of paradox, and an absurd, anti-nationalist flavor. Ferdydurke presents many themes explored in his later work: the problems of immaturity and youth, the masks people wear, and an ironic, critical examination of class roles in Polish society and culture, specifically the nobility and provincials. It provoked sharp critical reactions and immediately divided Gombrowicz's audience into worshipers and sworn enemies.

In his work, Gombrowicz struggled with Polish traditions and the country's difficult history. This battle was the starting point for his stories, which were deeply rooted in this tradition and history. Gombrowicz is remembered by scholars and admirers as a writer and a man unwilling to sacrifice his imagination or his originality for any price, person, god, society, or doctrine.

== Oeuvre: bibliography, translations, adaptations ==
Gombrowicz's novels and plays have been translated into 35 languages.

- Bacacay (short stories, 1933); original title Pamiętnik z okresu dojrzewania, later retitled Bakakaj
  - Bacacay, tr. Bill Johnston, Archipelago Books, 2004, ISBN 0-9728692-9-8.
- Ivona, Princess of Burgundia (play, 1935); Iwona, księżniczka Burgunda
- Ferdydurke (novel, 1937)
  - Ferdydurke, tr. Danuta Borchardt, Yale University Press, 2000, ISBN 0-300-08240-1.
- Possessed (novel, 1939); Opętani
  - Possessed: The Secret of Myslotch: A Gothic Novel, tr. J.A. Underwood (Marion Boyars, 1980), ISBN 9780714526843.
  - Possessed, tr. Antonia Lloyd-Jones (Fitzcarraldo Editions, 2023)
- The Marriage (play, 1948); Ślub
- Trans-Atlantyk (novel, 1953)
  - Trans-Atlantyk, tr. Carolyn French and Nina Karsov, Yale University Press (reprint), 1995, ISBN 0-300-06503-5.
  - Trans-Atlantyk: An Alternate Translation, tr. Danuta Borchardt, Yale University Press, 2014, ISBN 0-300-17530-2.
- Pornografia (novel, 1960)
  - Pornografia, Danuta Borchardt translator, Grove Press, 2009, ISBN 978-0-8021-1925-4.
- Cosmos (novel, 1965); Kosmos
  - Cosmos and Pornografia: Two Novels, tr. Eric Mosbacher and Alastair Hamilton, Grove Press (reissue edition), 1994, ISBN 0-8021-5159-0.
  - Cosmos, tr. Danuta Borchardt, Yale University Press, 2005, ISBN 0-300-10848-6.
- Operetta (play, 1966); Operetka
- Diaries, 1953–1969 (diary, 1969); Dzienniki
  - Diary Volumes 1–3, tr. Lillian Vallee, introductory essay: Wojciech Karpiński, Northwestern University Press, 1988, ISBN 0-8101-0715-5.

=== Other translations ===
- A Guide to Philosophy in Six Hours and Fifteen Minutes, Benjamin Ivry translator, Yale University Press, 2004, ISBN 0-300-10409-X.
- Polish Memories, tr. Bill Johnston, Yale University Press, 2004, ISBN 0-300-10410-3.
- A Kind of Testament, tr. Alastair Hamilton, Dalkey Archive Press (reprint), 2007, ISBN 1-56478-476-2.

=== Film adaptations ===
- Ferdydurke (1991) in Polish, directed by Jerzy Skolimowski. Also known as 30 Door Key.
- Pornografia (2003) in Polish, directed by Jan Jakub Kolski. Also known as Pornography.
- Cosmos (2015) in French, directed by Andrzej Żuławski. Won award for directing in Locarno, 2015.

The documentary filmmaker Nicolas Philibert made a documentary set in the radical French psychiatric clinic La Borde entitled Every Little Thing (French La Moindre des choses); released in 1997, the film follows the patients and staff as they stage a production of Gombrowicz's Operette.

=== Opera adaptations ===
- Yvonne, Prinzessin von Burgund (1973), composed by Boris Blacher, in four acts, premiered in Wuppertal
- Die Trauung (The Marriage) by Volker David Kirchner, premiered on 27 April 1975 at the Hessisches Staatstheater Wiesbaden, conducted by Siegfried Köhler
- Opérette (2002), composed by Oscar Strasnoy, premiered in 2003 at Grand Théâtre de Reims, France
- Geschichte/History (2003), a cappella opera composed by Oscar Strasnoy, premiered in 2004 at Theaterhaus de Stuttgart
- Die Besessenen (The Possessed) (2008–2009), composed by Johannes Kalitzke, premiered in 2010 at the Theater an der Wien, Vienna, Austria, on 19 February
- Yvonne, princesse de Bourgogne (2009), composed by Philippe Boesmans, premiered at the Paris Opera

== See also ==
- List of Polish-language authors
- List of Poles
