= Annie Tribel =

French interior architect and designer

- Tribel in 2018
- Born: 1933 (age 92–93); Paris
- Occupation: Designer
- Relatives: Jean Tribel

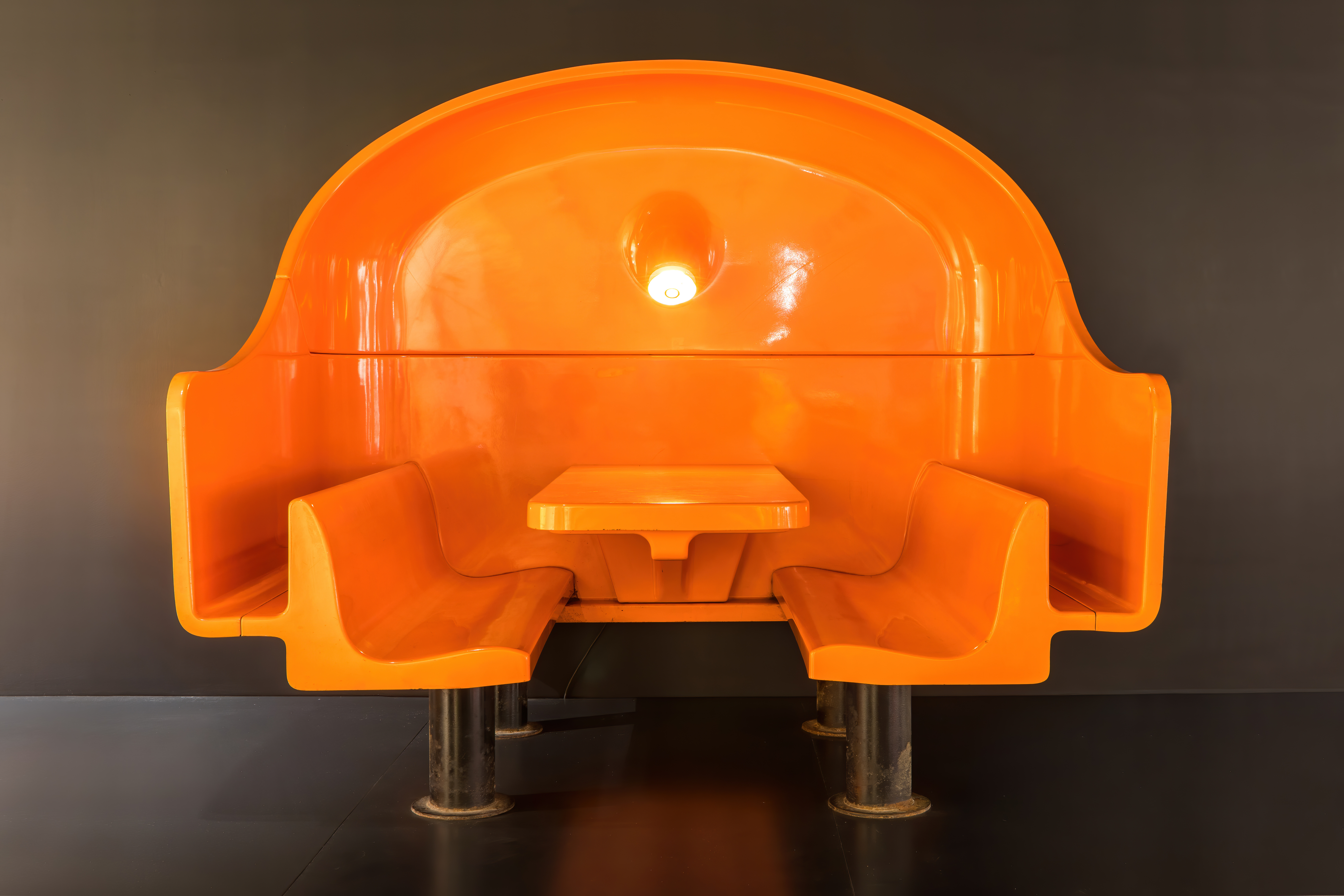
Table-banquette designed for the Théâtre de la Ville, Paris in 1968 (collection of the Design Museum Brussels)

Annie Tribel Heinz (born 1933) is a French architect and designer.

== Early life and education ==
Tribel was born in Paris in 1933. She attended the École nationale supérieure des arts décoratifs, graduating in 1956. Following her studies, she spent several years living and working in India. Upon her return to France, she undertook a number of interior design projects that included furniture inspired by Indian craft techniques.

== Career ==
In 1962, Tribel began working at Atelier d'urbanisme et d'architecture (AUA), an architecture and design collective that was co-founded by her brother, the architect Jean Tribel, and Jacques Allégret. AUA also included included Jean Perrottet, Georges Loiseau, Jacques Berce, and Valentin Fabre.

She frequently worked with the architects Paul Chemetov and Jean Deroche, designing the interiors and furniture for a number of projects such as the open-air theatre in Hammamet (1964), Foyer des anciens de La Courneuve, House of Shalit (1965–1967). In the early 1970s, she worked with Jacques Berce et Henri Ciriani on the design of modular housing units called Tétrodon houses.

Later projects include tha Théâtre de la Ville de Paris and interiors of Théâtre national de la Collined in Paris. In 1981, alongside Marc Held, Ronald-Cecil Sportes, Philippe Starck, and Jean-Michel Wilmotte, Tribel was one of the designers responsible for the refurbishment of François Mitterrand's private apartments in the Élysée Palace.

Tribel taught at École Camondo and the École Supérieure d’Arts Graphiques.

Works of Tribels's are in museum collections including the Pompidou Centre, Design Museum Brussels, and the Vitra Design Museum.

== Gallery ==
Fiberglass banquette seating shell with integrated lighting designed for the cafeteria of the Théâtre de la Ville in Paris. Manufactured by Dubigeon (France)

== Exhibitions ==
- 2009 Elles@centrepompidou, Centre Pompidou, Paris
- 2010 Mobi Boom, une explosion du design en France, Musée des Arts Décoratifs, Paris
- 2016 Une architecture de l'engagement: l'AUA (1960–1985), Cité de l'Architecture et du Patrimoine, Paris
- 2022 Années 80. Mode, design et graphisme en France, Musée des Arts Décoratifs, Paris
