= Possessed (novel) =

Novel

- Author: Witold Gombrowicz
- Original title: Opętani
- Language: Polish
- Publication date: 1939
- Publication place: Poland

Possessed (Polish: Opętani) is a 1939 novel by the Polish writer Witold Gombrowicz, published under the pseudonym Zdzisław Niewieski. It is a pastiche of gothic and serial novels in the vein of Horace Walpole and Eugène Sue.

== Publication ==
The novel was serialised in the summer 1939 in two Polish daily newspapers, under the pseudonym Zdzisław Niewieski. Only the first two parts were published before the outbreak of World War II. Witold Gombrowicz never claimed authorship of the work until a few days before his death in 1969. It was first published in book form in 1973 and translated from a French translation into English in 1980 by J. A. Underwood. In 1986, the three final parts of the novel were discovered. The full version was published in 1990 and a new English complete translation by Antonia Lloyd-Jones was published in 2023.

== See also ==
- 1939 in literature
- Polish literature
