= Łężyce, Świętokrzyskie Voivodeship =

Łężyce
- Village
- Location within Poland
- Coordinates: 50°48′59″N 21°19′39″E
- Country: Poland
- Voivodeship: Świętokrzyskie
- County: Opatów
- Gmina: Sadowie
- Population: 160

Łężyce [wɛ̃ˈʐɨt͡sɛ] is a village in the administrative district of Gmina Sadowie, within Opatów County, Świętokrzyskie Voivodeship, in south-central Poland. It lies approximately 5 km (3 mi) south-west of Sadowie, 7 km (4 mi) west of Opatów, and 51 km (32 mi) east of the regional capital Kielce.
