= Ferdydurke =

1937 novel by Witold Gombrowicz

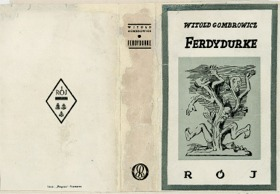
- Author: Witold Gombrowicz
- Translator: Danuta Borchardt
- Cover artist: Bruno Schulz
- Language: Polish
- Genre: Novel
- Publisher: Towarzystwo Wydawnicze "Rój", Warsaw (1st ed); Harcourt, Brace and World (New York 1961); Yale University Press (2000)
- Publication date: Oct 1937 (1st ed dated 1938)
- Publication place: Poland
- English publication date: 1961 (1st US ed), Aug 2000 (new translation)
- Media type: Print (Hardcover & trade paperback)
- Pages: 281pp (YUP ed)
- ISBN: 0-300-08240-1 (YUP pb), ISBN 0-7145-3403-X (2005 UK pb)
- OCLC: 43114995
- Dewey Decimal: 891.8/5273 21
- LC Class: PG7158.G669 F4713 2000

Ferdydurke is a novel by the Polish writer Witold Gombrowicz, published in 1937. It was his first and most controversial novel.

The book has been described as a "cult novel".

== Author's comment ==
Gombrowicz himself wrote of his novel that it is not "... a satire on some social class, nor a nihilistic attack on culture... We live in an era of violent changes, of accelerated development, in which settled forms are breaking under life's pressure... The need to find a form for what is yet immature, uncrystalized and underdeveloped, as well as the groan at the impossibility of such a postulate – this is the chief excitement of my book."

== Translations ==
The first translation of the novel, to Spanish, published in Buenos Aires in 1947, was done by Gombrowicz himself. A translation committee presided over by the Cuban writer Virgilio Piñera helped him in this endeavor, since Gombrowicz felt that he did not know the language well enough at the time to do it on his own. Gombrowicz again collaborated on a French translation of the book, with Ronald Martin in 1958. A direct German translation by Walter Tiel was published in 1960. In 2006, the first Brazilian Portuguese translation by Tomasz Barciński, direct from the Polish original text, was delivered.

The first English translation of Ferdydurke, by Eric Mosbacher, was published in 1961. It was a combined indirect translation of the French, German and possibly Spanish translations. In 2000, Yale University Press published the first direct translation from the original Polish. The 2000 edition, translated by Danuta Borchardt, has an introduction by Susan Sontag.

Direct and indirect translations now exist in over twenty languages.

== Adaptations ==
Jerzy Skolimowski directed the 1991 film adaptation of Ferdydurke (alternate English title: 30 Door Key) with an international cast including Iain Glen, Crispin Glover, Beata Poźniak, Robert Stephens, Judith Godrèche, Zbigniew Zamachowski, and Fabienne Babe.

In 1999, Ferdydurke was adapted into a stage play by Provisorium & Kompania Theater from Lublin.

== Analysis ==
The novel has been described as a "meditation on stupidity and immaturity", with its other main themes being the tragedy of passing from immature, utopian youth to adulthood, and the degree to which culture can infantilize various subjects.

== Reception ==
The book was Gombrowicz's first and most controversial novel. It has been described since as a cult novel. Writing in 1995, Warren F. Motte commented that the book "exemplifies that rare bird of literary avant-garde: a text that retains, decades after its initial publication, the power to shock.".

== Influences ==
Among works influenced by the book is Jacek Dukaj's novel Other Songs.
