= Wszechświęte, Świętokrzyskie Voivodeship =

Wszechświęte
- Village
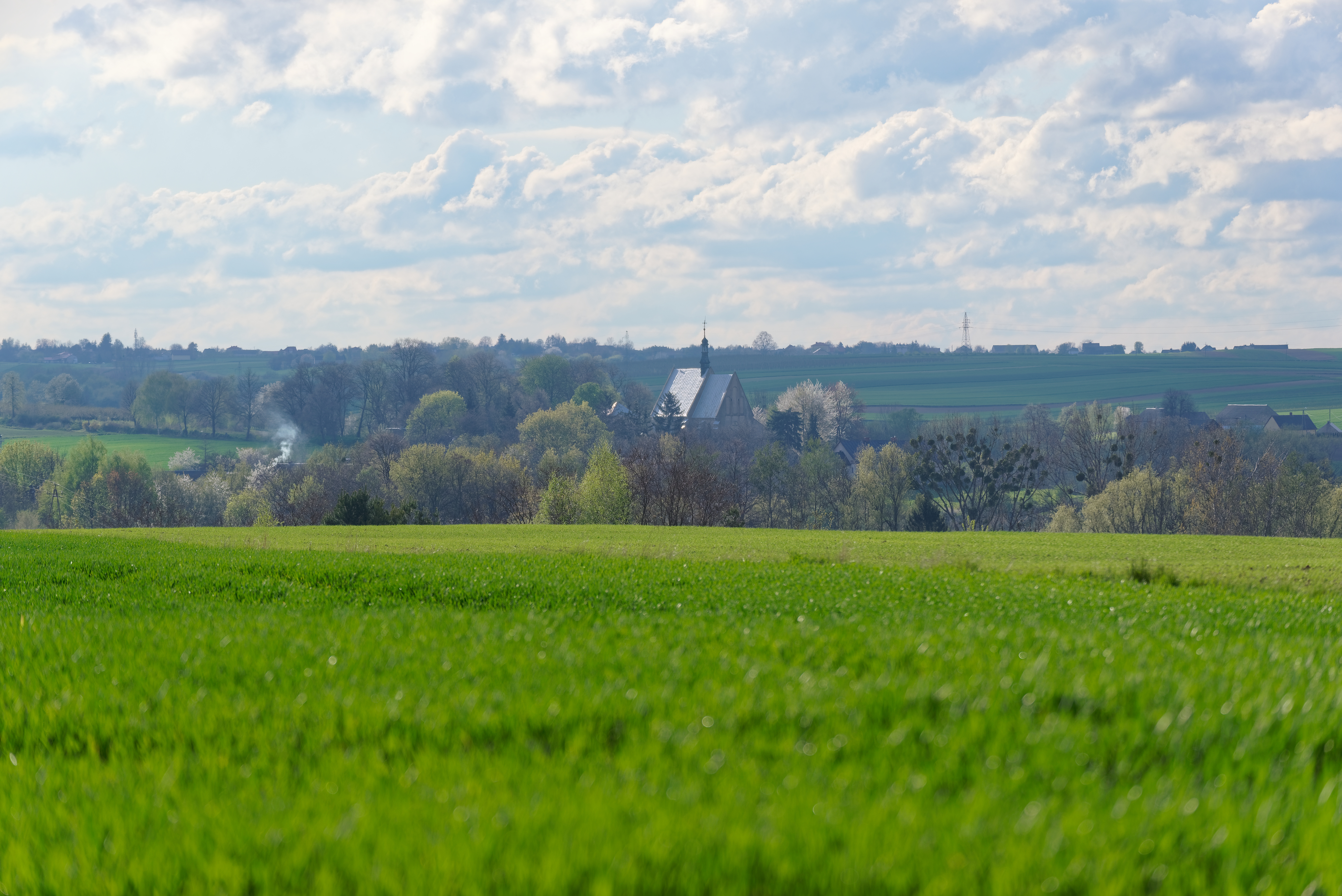

- Location within Poland
- Coordinates: 50°51′51″N 21°25′44″E
- Country: Poland
- Voivodeship: Świętokrzyskie
- County: Opatów
- Gmina: Sadowie
- Population: 120

Wszechświęte [fʂɛxɕˈfjɛntɛ] is a village in the administrative district of Gmina Sadowie, within Opatów County, Świętokrzyskie Voivodeship, in south-central Poland. It lies approximately 5 km (3 mi) east of Sadowie, 7 km (4 mi) north of Opatów, and 58 km (36 mi) east of the regional capital Kielce.
