= Jorge Lavelli =

French theatre and opera director (1932–2023)

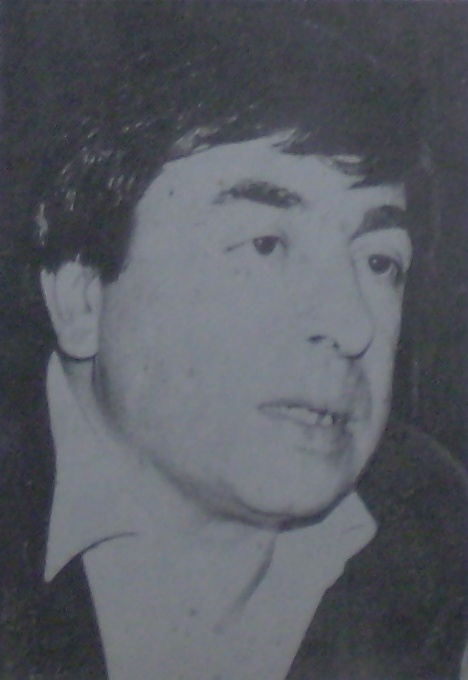
- Lavelli in 1982
- Born: 11 November 1932; Buenos Aires, Argentina
- Died: 9 October 2023 (aged 90); Paris, France
- Occupations: Stage director; Opera director; Theatre manager
- Organizations: Théâtre des Nations; Théâtre national de la Colline; Paris Opera
- Awards: Order of Arts and Letters; Legion of Honor; Ordre National du Mérite

Jorge Lavelli (11 November 1932 – 9 October 2023) was an Argentine-born French theatre and opera director. He staged first plays and then opera, and in both fields, he was open to contemporary pieces without neglecting the classic repertoire.

Lavelli was first recognised when he directed Witold Gombrowicz's The Marriage for a 1963 drama competition. He was head of the Théâtre national de la Colline in Paris from 1987 to 1996, focusing on 20th-century plays. As an opera director, he worked mainly for the Paris Opera and for leading opera houses and festivals internationally. His 1975 production of Gounod's Faust for Paris, set during World War I, was played until 2003.

== Life and career ==
Jorge Lavelli was born in Buenos Aires on 11 November 1932 to parents who had immigrated from Italy. He moved to France in 1960, having received a scholarship from the National Fund for the Arts for classes at both the Charles Dullin school and the Jacques Lecoq school.

=== Drama ===
In 1961, Lavelli joined the Théâtre des Nations in Paris. In 1963, he took part in a national competition for young companies, staging Witold Gombrowicz's The Marriage. He won the competition, and introduced the Polish playwright to the French public. Lavelli later staged Gombrowicz's Yvonne, Princess of Burgundy (1965) and Operetta (1971).

In 1967, Lavelli began a collaboration with Jean Vilar to stage Goethe's Triumph der Empfindsamkeit (Triumph of Sensitivity) and Oskar Panizza's The Love Council (1969; sets and costumes by the surrealist painter Leonor Fini).

From 1987 to 1996, Lavelli was head of the Théâtre national de la Colline in Paris and gave it a focus on contemporary plays. He introduced French audiences to works by Fernando Arrabal (Pique-nique en campagne, La Princesse et la Communiante), Edward Bond, Peter Handke, Lars Noren (La Veillée), René de Obaldia (Le Cosmonaute agricole), Harold Pinter, and Serge Rezvani. He staged García Lorca's Le Public in 1987, and Copi's Une visite inopportune in 1988.

Lavelli also staged plays by Shakespeare, Corneille, Ramón del Valle-Inclán, Schnitzler, Brecht, Eugène Ionesco, Pirandello, Dürrenmatt, Thomas Bernhard, O'Neill, George Tabori, Chekhov, and Bulgakov. Lavelli directed Copi's L'Ombre de Venceslas at the Théâtre du Rond-Point in 2001, Arthur Miller's Mr. Peters' Connections at the Théâtre de l'Atelier in 2002, Calderón La hija del aire (The Daughter of the Air) in Madrid in 2004, Tankred Dorst 's Merlin oder das wüste Land at the Festival Nuits de Fourvière in 2005, three works by Juan Mayorga, a young Spanish playwright at the Théâtre de la Tempête (Chemin du ciel in 2007, Le Garçon du dernier rang in 2009, Lettres d'amour à Staline in 2011), Oedipus Rex by Sophocles at the 2009 Mérida Festival, and Molière's L'Avare in Madrid in 2010.

=== Opera ===
The first opera that Lavelli directed was Orden, a political opera with a libretto by Pierre Bourgeade and music by Girolamo Arrigo, at the 1969 Aix-en-Provence Festival.

He directed 20th-century operas, such as Rolf Liebermann's Medea, Maurice Ohana's La Célestine, Salome by Richard Strauss, Stravinsky's Oedipus Rex, and works by Bartók, Gottfried von Einem, Luigi Nono, Prokofiev and Heinrich Sutermeister. He staged the world premiere of Cécilia by Charles Chaynes at the Opéra de Monte-Carlo in 2000. He also directed at the Paris Opera classical repertoire such as Gounod's Faust; the 1975 production set during World War I was reprised 13 times until 2003. He directed there Verdi's La traviata, Bellini's Norma, Handel's Alcina, and Mozart's Die Entführung aus dem Serail, Le nozze di FigaroL and Die Zauberflöte. He also staged there Debussy's Pelléas et Mélisande, Puccini's Madame Butterfly, Ravel's L'enfant et les sortilèges, and Handel's Ariodante.

He staged Handel's Siroe at La Fenice in Venice in 2000), Xavier Montsalvatge's Babel 46 at the Teatro Real in Madrid in 2002, Wagner's Der fliegende Holländer at the Teatro di San Carlo in Naples in 2003, the world premiere of Zygmunt Krauze's Polieukt in Warsaw in 2010 and the Capitole de Toulouse in 2011, Wagner's Rienzi in Toulouse in 2012, Mozart's Idomeneo at the Teatro Colón in Buenos Aires in 2014, the world premiere of Martín Matalon's L'Ombre de Venceslas, an opera based on Copi's play, at the Opéra de Rennes in a coproduction with Toulouse in 2016, and Janáček's Jenůfa at the Municipal Theatre of Santiago in 2017.

=== Personal life ===
Lavelli was married to Dominique. He died in Paris on 9 October 2023, at age 90.

== Recognition ==
Lavelli won theatrical prizes in France, Spain, and Italy. He was nominated for the Molière Award for Best Director five times. He was made Commander of the Order of Arts and Letters in 1993, Commander of the Order of the Legion of Honor in 1994, and Chevalier (in 1992) and Officer (in 2002) of the National Order of Merit.
