= Théâtre national de la Colline =

Theatre in Paris, France

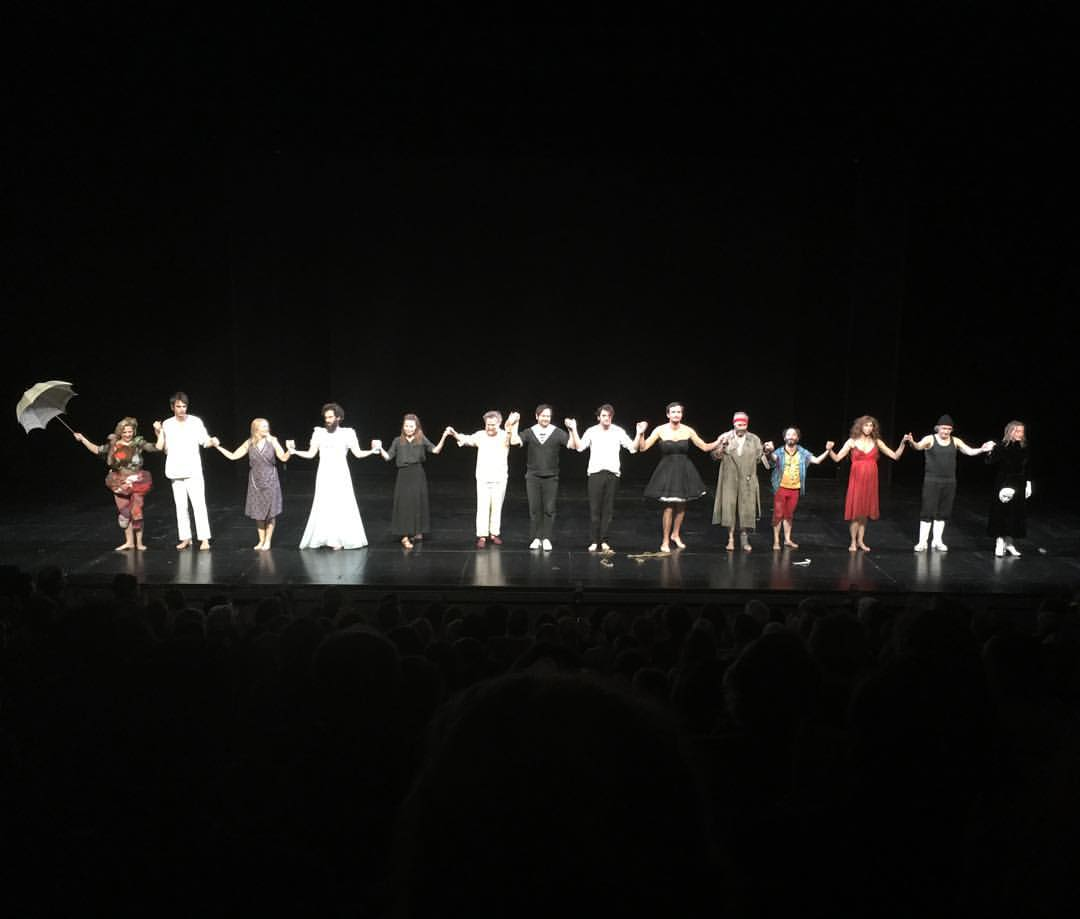
- A 2015 production of Les Géants de la montagne de Luigi
- Interactive map of Théâtre national de la Colline
- Address: 15, rue Malte-Brun, 20th. Paris; Paris; France
- Coordinates: 48.864419°N 2.397386°E
- Capacity: main theatre: 750 small theatre: 200

Construction
- Opened: 1951
- Architects: Valentine Fabre, John Perrottet

Website
- www.colline.fr

The Théâtre national de la Colline (French pronunciation: [teɑtʁ nɑsjɔnal də la kɔlin]) is a theatre at 15, rue Malte-Brun in the 20th arrondissement of Paris. The closest métro station is Gambetta. It is one of the five national theatres dedicated to drama which are entirely supported by the French Ministry of Culture. The other four are the Odéon-Théâtre, the Comédie-Française, the Théâtre National de Chaillot, and the Théâtre National de Strasbourg. Its status as a national theatre mandates that its mission is to promote contemporary works, hence the Colline mainly stages works of the twentieth century.

Various artists have succeeded at the direction of the theatre. Jorge Lavelli directed the theatre from 1987 to 1996, stage director Alain Françon directed it from 1996 to 2010. In January 2009, stage director, Stéphane Braunschweig became an associate artist at the theatre and assumed the directorship from 2010 to 2016. Actor, author and stage director Wajdi Mouawad was appointed director in April 2016.

== History ==
The Théâtre national de la Colline was founded in 1951 by The Guild, a company headed by Guy Rétoré. It became a permanent theatre in 1960. In 1983 the French Minister of Culture, Jack Lang, had the theatre rebuilt. As a result, there are now two auditoriums—a large room that seats 750 people, and a small room that seats 200. There is also a restaurant, a bar, and a spacious lobby.

The theatre is the work of architects Valentine Fabre and John Perrottet, assisted by Alberto Cattani. They had to harmonize with the design of the city theatre and the great hall of the Théâtre national de Chaillot. The façade of the building is a 12-meter high structure made of glass and metal, which gives the building a certain grandeur in the middle of the small street Malte-Brun and makes it a classic representative of 1980s architecture. The interior was designed by Annie Tribel Heinz, using coloured varnish and wood preservative to emphasize the natural grain of the underlying wood.

Alain Françon directed the theatre from 1996 to 2010. In January 2009, Stéphane Braunschweig became an associate artist at the theatre and assumed the directorship from 2010 to 2016.
