= Zwola, Świętokrzyskie Voivodeship =

Zwola
- Village
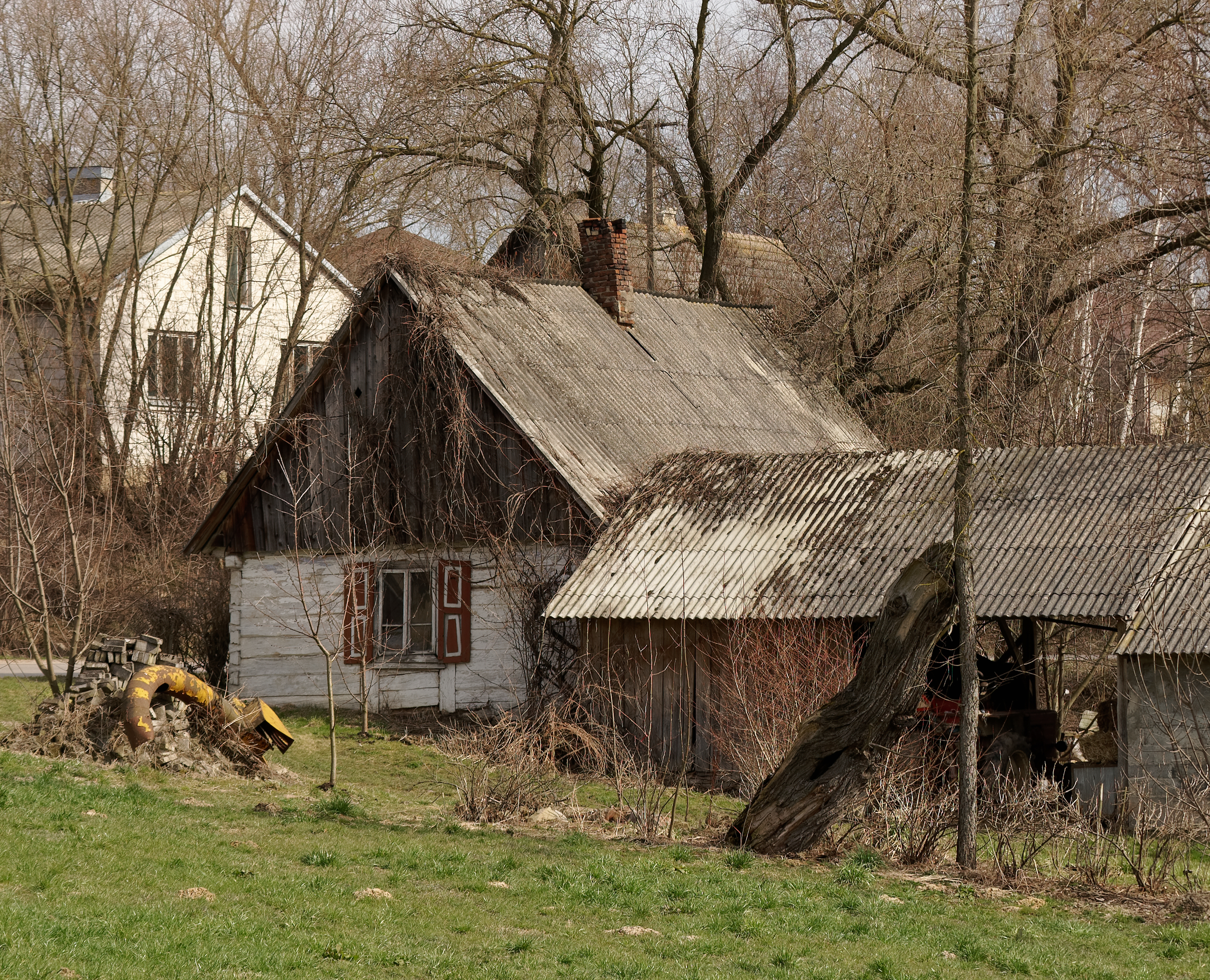

- Location within Poland
- Coordinates: 50°50′36″N 21°16′53″E
- Country: Poland
- Voivodeship: Świętokrzyskie
- County: Opatów
- Gmina: Sadowie
- Population: 170

Zwola [ˈzvɔla] is a village in the administrative district of Gmina Sadowie, within Opatów County, Świętokrzyskie Voivodeship, in south-central Poland. It lies approximately 7 km (4 mi) west of Sadowie, 11 km (7 mi) north-west of Opatów, and 47 km (29 mi) east of the regional capital Kielce.
