= Gmina Sadowie =

Gmina Sadowie Sadowie Commune
- Gmina
- Interactive map of Gmina Sadowie
- Coordinates (Sadowie): 50°51′6″N 21°22′13″E
- Country: Poland
- Voivodeship: Świętokrzyskie
- County: Opatów
- Seat: Sadowie

Area
  - Total: 81.71 km^{2} (31.55 sq mi)

Population (2006)
  - Total: 4,289
  - Density: 52.49/km^{2} (135.9/sq mi)
- Website: http://www.sadowie.com.pl

Gmina Sadowie is a rural gmina (administrative district) in Opatów County, Świętokrzyskie Voivodeship, in south-central Poland. Its seat is the village of Sadowie, which lies approximately 7 kilometres (4 mi) north-west of Opatów and 54 km (34 mi) east of the regional capital Kielce.

The gmina covers an area of 81.71 square kilometres (31.5 sq mi), and as of 2006 its total population is 4,289.

The gmina contains part of the protected area called Jeleniowska Landscape Park.

== Villages ==
Gmina Sadowie contains the villages and settlements of Biskupice, Bogusławice, Bukowiany, Czerwona Góra, Grocholice, Jacentów, Łężyce, Małoszyce, Michałów, Niemienice, Obręczna, Okręglica, Porudzie, Ruszków, Ruszkowiec, Rżuchów, Sadowie, Szczucice, Truskolasy, Wszechświęte, Zochcin and Zwola.

== Neighbouring gminas ==
Gmina Sadowie is bordered by the gminas of Baćkowice, Bodzechów, Ćmielów, Opatów and Waśniów.
