= Rzuchów, Świętokrzyskie Voivodeship =

Rzuchów
- Village
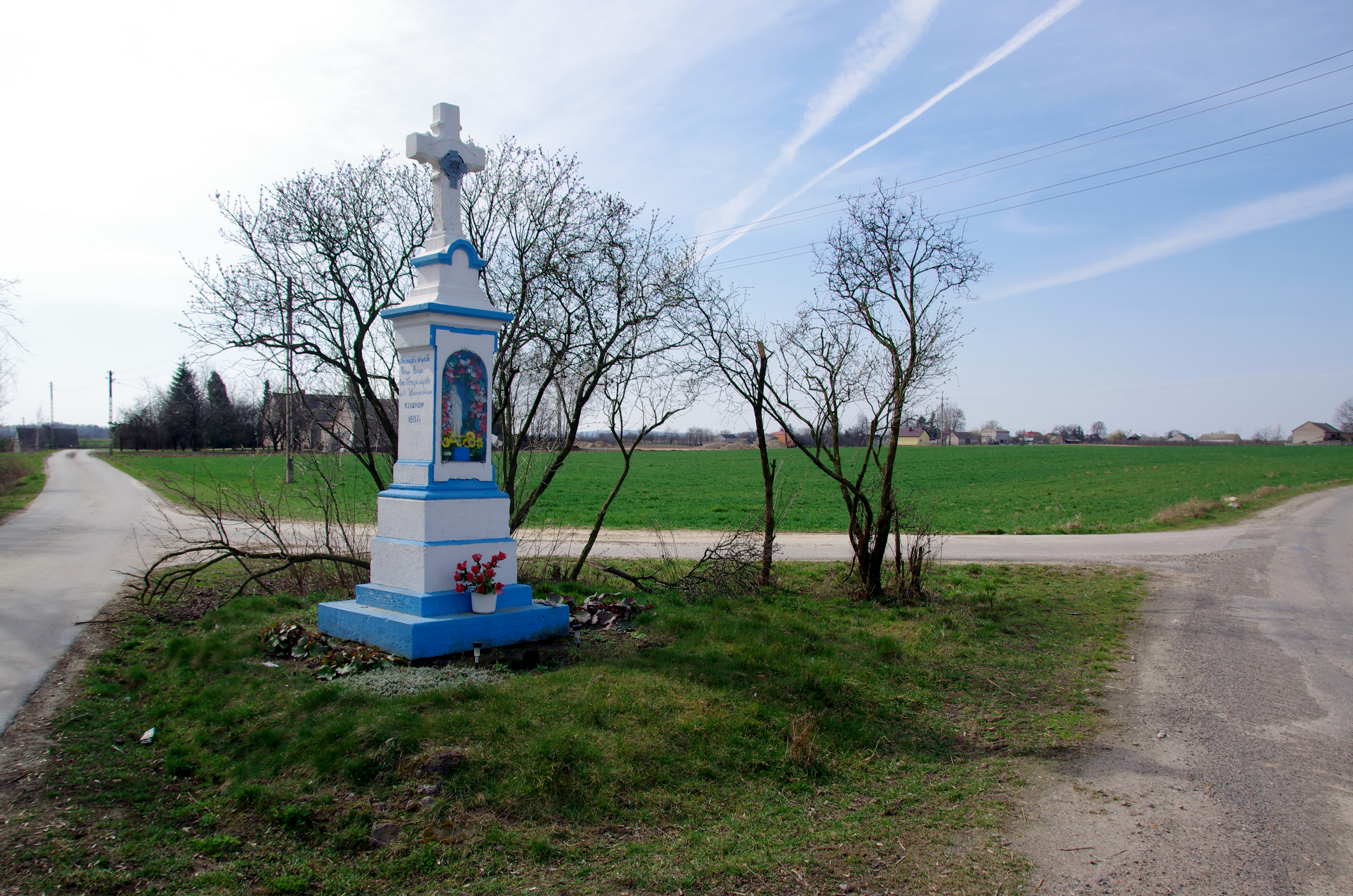

- Location within Poland
- Coordinates: 50°52′31″N 21°22′14″E
- Country: Poland
- Voivodeship: Świętokrzyskie
- County: Opatów
- Gmina: Sadowie
- Population: 310

Rzuchów [ˈʐuxuf] is a village in the administrative district of Gmina Sadowie, within Opatów County, Świętokrzyskie Voivodeship, in south-central Poland. It lies approximately 3 km (2 mi) north of Sadowie, 9 km (6 mi) north-west of Opatów, and 53 km (33 mi) east of the regional capital Kielce.
