= Jean Perrottet =

French architect (1925–2021)

- Born: 31 May 1925; Paris, France
- Died: 26 February 2021 (aged 95); Montreuil, France
- Occupation: Architect

Jean Perrottet (31 May 1925 – 26 February 2021) was a French architect. He was best known for his restorations of Parisian theatres in the 1960s.

== Biography ==
Perrottet studied architecture at the Beaux-Arts de Paris from 1947 to 1954 alongside Guy Lagneau. He joined Valentin Fabre, Jacques Allégret, Jean Tribel, Paul Chemetov, and Georges Loiseau to create the Atelier d'urbanisme et d'architecture. He was awarded the Prix de l'Équerre d'Argent in 1960.

Perrottet specialized in public architectural projects, particularly theatres and cultural centers. Thanks to André Malraux and Jack Lang, he was able to gain support from the French government, which helped him gain notoriety. He helped restore the old Théâtre Sarah-Bernhardt, which became the Théâtre de la Ville.

Jean Perrottet died on 26 February 2021, at his home in Montreuil, at the age of 95.

== Main works ==
- Théâtre de la Ville (1968)
- Théâtre national de Chaillot (1975)
- Théâtre du Vésinet (1975)
- Théâtre de l'Agora (1975)
- Théâtre de la Commune (1976)
- Salle des congrès du Mans (1981)
- Théâtre de Sartrouville (1986)
- Théâtre national de la Colline (1988)
- Théâtre des Gémeaux (1994)
- Théâtre municipal d'Angoulême (1997)
- Pôle culturel de La Seyne-sur-Mer (2006)
