= 30 Door Key =

- Polish theatrical release poster
- Directed by: Jerzy Skolimowski
- Screenplay by: Jerzy Skolimowski; Michał Skolimowski; Józef Skolimowski
- Based on: Ferdydurke by Witold Gombrowicz
- Produced by: Jerzy Skolimowski
- Starring: Iain Glen; Robert Stephens; Crispin Glover
- Cinematography: Witold Adamek
- Edited by: Marek Denys; Grażyna Jasińska-Wiśniarowska
- Music by: Stanisław Syrewicz
- Production companies: Million Frames Limited; Cinea
- Distributed by: FSF
- Release dates: 2 September 1991 (Venice); 21 February 1992 (Poland)
- Running time: 88 minutes
- Countries: France; Poland; United Kingdom
- Language: English

30 Door Key (Polish: Ferdydurke [fɛr.dɘ̟.ˈdur.kɛ]), also spelled as Thirty Door Key, is a 1991 English-language drama film directed and produced by Jerzy Skolimowski, and written by Skolimowski, Michał Skolimowski (credited as Michael Lyndon), and Józef Skolimowski (credited as Joseph Kay). It starred Iain Glen, Robert Stephens, and Crispin Glover. The film was based on the 1937 novel Ferdydurke by Witold Gombrowicz. The film premiered at the 48th Venice International Film Festival on 2 September 1991 and was released in Poland on 21 February 1992. It was produced in France, Poland, and the United Kingdom by Million Frames Limited and Cinea.

== Plot ==
The film is set in Warsaw, Poland in the Summer of 1939. A 30-year-old aspiring novelist, Joey Kowalski, just published his first book. One day, he is visited by his former teacher, professor Pimco, who reverts him in time to being a student in the middle school. There he observes the squabbles of his classmates, which he finds immature. He is hosted by the Young family, where he is infatuated and sexually attracted to sexually liberated 16-years-old girl, Zoo Young, who disregards him. Eventually, he escapes Pimco's control, and together with a fellow student, Mintus, escapes the city to a nearby village, living in the house of the Hurlecki family, which is part of a minor nobility. There he is infatuated with girl Sophie Hurlecka, a cousin of Zoo Young, who reciprocates his feelings. As Mintus begins to fraternize with peasants and servants, he accidentally stars a peasant revolution. It courses a fire to start, which forces Joey and Zosia escape the village at the night, in a small boat named Transatlantic, with sirens sounding an alarms, as German Air Force starts dropping bombs on Warsaw in an air raid, beginning the Invasion of Poland.

== Cast ==
- Iain Glen as Joey Kowalski
- Robert Stephens as professor Pimco
- Crispin Glover as Mintus
- Fabienne Babe as Sophie Hurlecka
- Beata Tyszkiewicz as aunt Hurlecka
- Tadeusz Łomnicki as uncle Hurlecki
- Dorota Stalińska as Mrs. Young
- Jan Peszek as Mr. Young
- Judith Godrèche as Zoo Young
- Zbigniew Zamachowski as Tom
- Jerzy Bińczycki as professor Filidor
- Kalina Jędrusik as professor Filidor's wife
- Henryk Bista as Anti-Filidor
- Beata Poźniak as Flora Gente
- Magdalena Wójcik as Joey's servant
- Artur Żmijewski as Kopyrda
- Robert Więckiewicz as Poppy
- Dariusz Gnatowski as Pyzo
- Krzysztof Janczar as Leo
- Jerzy Skolimowski as head teacher Piórkowski
- Marek Probosz as Syphonus
- Jan Pietrzak as the ambassador of France
- Małgorzata Potocka as the ambassador's wife
- Michał Pawlicki as a teacher

== Production and release ==
The film was directed and produced by Jerzy Skolimowski, and written by Skolimowski, Michał Skolimowski (credited as Michael Lyndon), and Józef Skolimowski (credited as Joseph Kay). It starred Iain Glen, Robert Stephens, and Crispin Glover. The cinematography was done by Witold Adamek, editing by Marek Denys and Grażyna Jasińska-Wiśniarowska, music by Stanisław Syrewicz, scenography by Andrzej Przedworski and Janusz Sosnowski, and costumes by Ewa Krauze. The film was produced in France, Poland, and the United Kingdom by Million Frames Limited and Cinea. It premiered at the 48th Venice International Film Festival on 2 September 1991, and was released in Poland on 21 February 1992.

The film was based on the 1937 novel Ferdydurke by Witold Gombrowicz. Being produced for international audiences, many aspects relating to Polish culture were removed, and simplified. Due to difficulties in presenting the philosophical ideas of the novel, the production focused more on the film's plot, while also putting more enthesis on depicting the social and political realities of the 1930s in Poland. The film also ends with the Invasion of Poland and the outbreak of the Second World War on 1 September 1939, which were not present in the book and took place after its publication.

The Polish-language film's title, Ferdydurke is a meaningless word coined by Gombrowicz. The English title, 30 Door Key, was coined as phonetically similar to the Polish equivalent. Skolimowski stated that, aside of phonetics, the title is also meant to symbolise the main character, a 30-years-old, looking for a key to the metaphoric doors between infantilism and maturity. It was also intentionally kept grammatically incorrect.

== Reception ==
The film was received mostly negatively, with both audiences and critics finding it confusing. The simplification of the plot, which was seen as not interesting, at the expense the philosophical ideas present in the original novel, were wildly criticised, being seen as the consequence of the attempt to adopt the story into the international markets. The critic Mateusz Werner stated in 1992, that "Skolimowski essentially mistook the novel's plot for its substance", and argued that the scenes from the book were adopted too literally, missing their philosophical and symbolic aspects. In 2016, the British Film Institute described it as "artistic misfire".

The critical failure of the film led to Skolimowski's 17-year break in directing. In 2022, he described the film as a wrong choice, badly executed, and said that the result was very poorly received.
