= Truskolasy, Świętokrzyskie Voivodeship =

Truskolasy
- Village
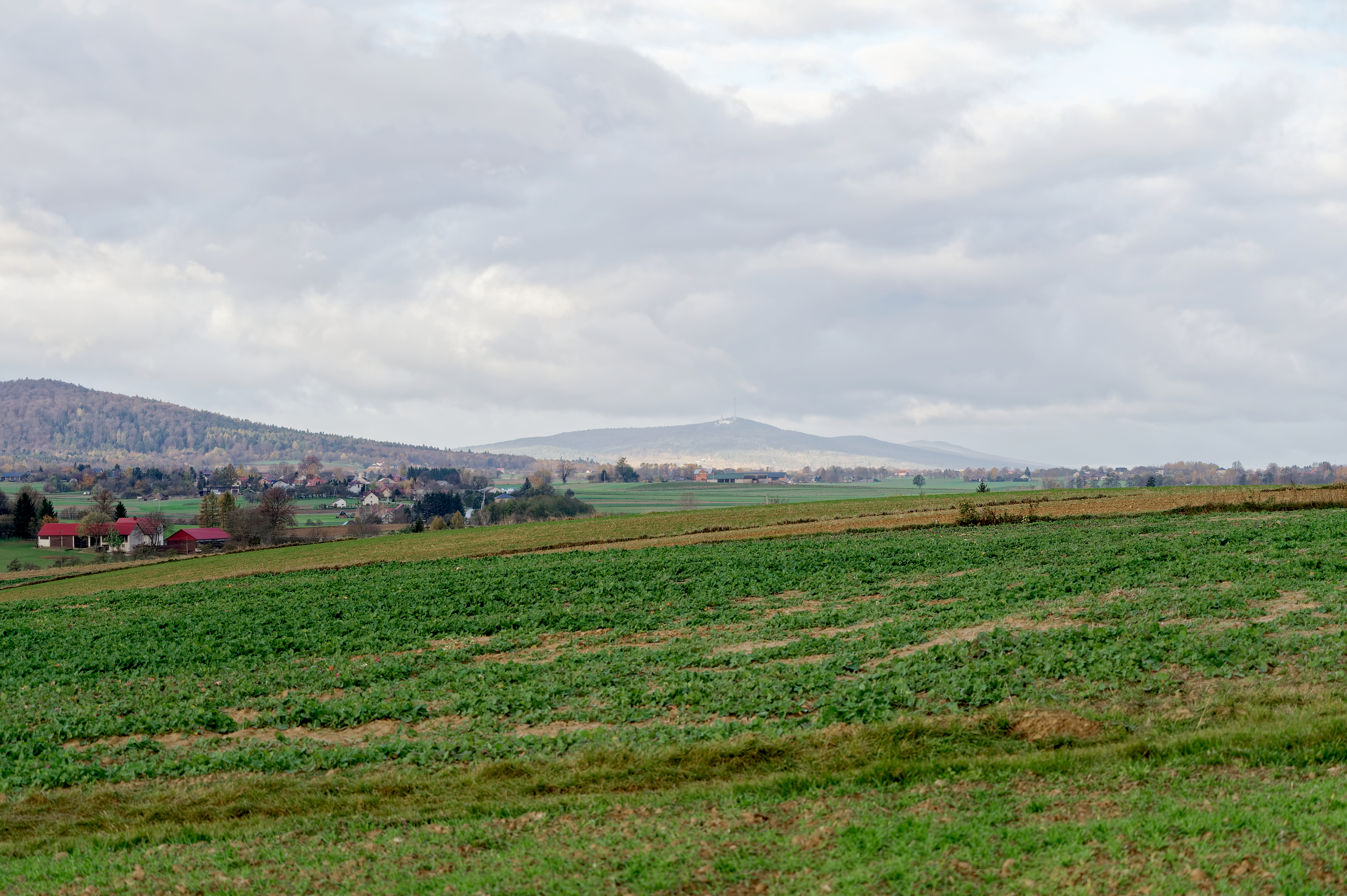

- Location within Poland
- Coordinates: 50°49′43″N 21°16′9″E
- Country: Poland
- Voivodeship: Świętokrzyskie
- County: Opatów
- Gmina: Sadowie
- Population: 140

Truskolasy [truskɔˈlasɨ] is a village in the administrative district of Gmina Sadowie, within Opatów County, Świętokrzyskie Voivodeship, in south-central Poland. It lies approximately 8 km (5 mi) west of Sadowie, 12 km (7 mi) west of Opatów, and 47 km (29 mi) east of the regional capital.
