= Trans-Atlantyk =

1953 novel by Witold Gombrowicz

- First edition
- Author: Witold Gombrowicz
- Translator: Carolyn French/Nina Karsov
- Language: Polish
- Publisher: Paris: Instytut literacki Yale University Press (Eng. trans.)
- Publication date: 1953 (Eng. trans. June 1994)
- Publication place: Poland
- Media type: Print (Hardback & Paperback)
- Pages: 152 pp (Eng. trans.)
- ISBN: 0-300-05384-3 (Eng. trans. hardback edition) & ISBN 0-300-06503-5 (Eng. trans. paperback edition)
- OCLC: 28586039
- Dewey Decimal: 891.8/537 20
- LC Class: PG7158.G669 T713 1994

Trans-Atlantyk is a novel by the Polish author Witold Gombrowicz, originally published in 1953. The semi-autobiographical plot of the novel closely tracks Gombrowicz's own experience in the years during and just after the outbreak of World War II.

== Plot ==
Witold, a Polish writer, embarks on an ocean voyage only to have the war break out while he is visiting Argentina. Finding himself penniless and stranded after the Nazis take over his country, he is taken in by the local Polish emigre community. A fantastical series of twists and turns follow in which the young man finds himself, after a debauched night of drinking, involved as a second in a duel. Witold is constantly confronted with the exasperating contrasts between his love of country and his status as a forced expatriate and the shallow nationalism of his fellow Poles.

== Reception ==
George Hydge reviewed the book for The Times Literary Supplement. According to the reviewer, "this is surely the most devastating account of what exile can do to you in the whole of literature".
