= Sadowie, Świętokrzyskie Voivodeship =

Sadowie
- Village
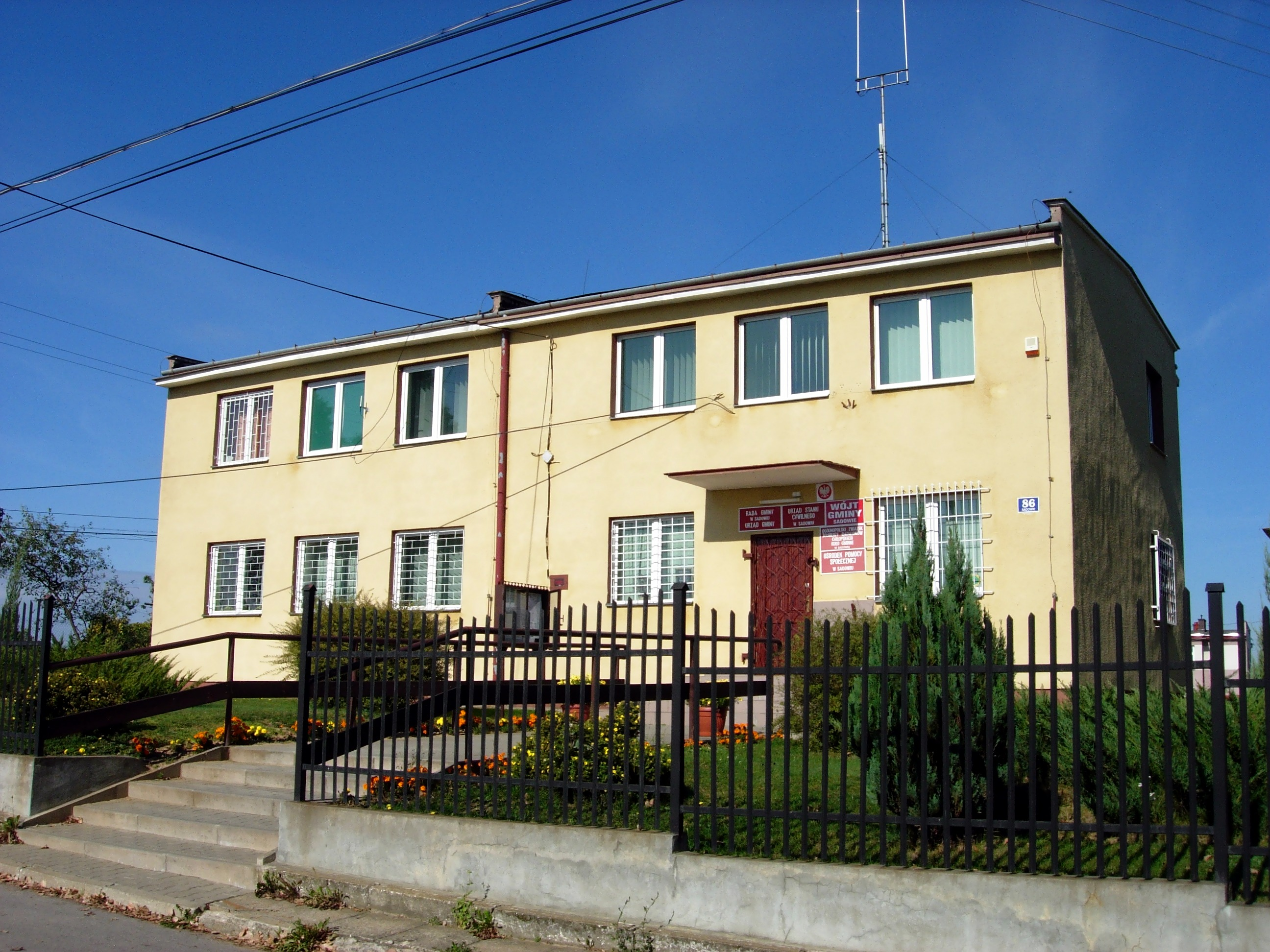
- Gmina office

- Location within Poland
- Coordinates: 50°51′6″N 21°22′13″E
- Country: Poland
- Voivodeship: Świętokrzyskie
- County: Opatów
- Gmina: Sadowie
- Population: 600

Sadowie [saˈdɔvjɛ] is a village in Opatów County, Świętokrzyskie Voivodeship, in south-central Poland. It is the seat of the gmina (administrative district) called Gmina Sadowie. It lies approximately 7 km (4 mi) north-west of Opatów and 54 km (34 mi) east of the regional capital Kielce.
