= Bérengère Dautun =

French actress

Bérengère Dautun (born 10 May 1939), whose first name is sometimes written Bérangère whose real name is Bérengère Marie Gaubens-Cabrol, is a French actress, resident of the Comédie-Française in 1964, then member of the society from 1972 to 1997. She has been married to surgeon Christian Cabrol since 1998.

== Roles ==
=== Film ===
- 1987 : Falsch, des Frères Dardenne.
- 1978 : Au théâtre ce soir : Le Nouveau Testament de Sacha Guitry, mise en scène Robert Manuel, réalisation Pierre Sabbagh, Théâtre Marigny
- 1977 : Blue Jeans de Hugues Burin des Roziers
- 1974 : Valérie, de François Dupont-Midi
- 1974 : Au théâtre ce soir : Édouard, mon fils de Robert Morley et Noel Langley, mise en scène Jacques Ardouin, réalisation Georges Folgoas, Théâtre Marigny
- 1970 : Au théâtre ce soir : Un fil à la patte de Georges Feydeau, mise en scène Jacques Charon, réalisation Pierre Sabbagh, Théâtre Marigny (spectacle de la Comédie-Française)
- 1969 : Les Patates.
- 1968 : Eugénie Grandet, réalisation : Alain Boudet, d'après le roman d'Honoré de Balzac Eugénie Grandet.
- 1968 : Le Crime de David Levinstein d'André Charpak
- 1968 : Catherine, il suffit d'un amour.
- 1968 : Un mur à Jérusalem.
- 1967 : Le Crime de David Levinstein d'André Charpak
- 1963 : La chasse ou l'amour ravi d'Alain Boudet, (TV)
- 1963 : Le vray mystère de la Passion de Louis Dalmas

=== Theatre ===
==== Carrière à la Comédie-Française ====
- 1964: Cyrano de Bergerac d'Edmond Rostand, mise en scène Jacques Charon, Comédie-Française
- 1965 : Le Songe d'une nuit d'été de Shakespeare, mise en scène Jacques Fabbri, Comédie-Française
- 1965 : Suréna de Corneille, mise en scène Maurice Escande, Comédie-Française
- 1965 : L'Orphelin de la Chine de Voltaire, mise en scène Jean Mercure, Comédie-Française
- 1966 : Le Voyage de Thésée de Georges Neveux, mise en scène Michel Etcheverry, Festival de Bellac
- 1967: Cyrano de Bergerac d'Edmond Rostand, mise en scène Jacques Charon, Comédie-Française
- 1969 : Polyeucte de Corneille, mise en scène Michel Bernardy, Comédie-Française
- 1970 : Dom Juan de Molière, mise en scène Antoine Bourseiller, Comédie-Française, tournée USA, Canada
- 1970 : Le Songe d'August Strindberg, mise en scène Raymond Rouleau, Comédie-Française
- 1971 : L'Impromptu de Versailles de Molière, mise en scène Pierre Dux, Comédie-Française
- 1971 : Becket ou l'Honneur de Dieu de Jean Anouilh, mise en scène de l'auteur et Roland Piétri, Comédie-Française
- 1971 : Le Malade imaginaire de Molière, mise en scène Jean-Laurent Cochet, Comédie-Française
- 1972: Cyrano de Bergerac d'Edmond Rostand, mise en scène Jacques Charon, Comédie-Française
- 1972 : Antigone de Bertolt Brecht, mise en scène Jean-Pierre Miquel, Comédie-Française au Théâtre national de l'Odéon
- 1973 : L'Impromptu de Versailles de Molière, mise en scène Pierre Dux, Comédie-Française
- 1973 : On ne saurait penser à tout de Alfred de Musset, mise en scène Jean-Laurent Cochet, Comédie-Française
- 1973 : Un fil à la patte de Georges Feydeau, mise en scène Jacques Charon, Comédie-Française
- 1975 : La Célestine de Fernando de Rojas, mise en scène Marcel Maréchal, Comédie-Française au Théâtre Marigny
- 1976 : Hommage à Jean Cocteau, conception André Fraigneau, Comédie-Française
- 1976 : La Commère de Marivaux, mise en scène Jean-Paul Roussillon, Comédie-Française
- 1976 : Maître Puntila et son valet Matti de Bertolt Brecht, mise en scène Guy Rétoré, Comédie-Française au Théâtre Marigny
- 1976 : Iphigénie en Aulide de Racine, mise en scène Jacques Destoop, Comédie-Française
- 1976 : Cyrano de Bergerac de Edmond Rostand, mise en scène Jean-Paul Roussillon, Comédie-Française
- 1977 : Le Malade imaginaire de Molière, mise en scène Jean-Laurent Cochet, Comédie-Française
- 1978 : Britannicus de Racine, mise en scène Jean-Pierre Miquel, Comédie-Française
- 1979 : Dave au bord de mer de René Kalisky, mise en scène Antoine Vitez, Comédie-Française au Théâtre national de l'Odéon
- 1980 : Simul et singulis, Soirée littéraire consacrée au Tricentenaire de la Comédie-Française, mise en scène Jacques Destoop, Comédie-Française
- 1981 : Sertorius de Corneille, mise en scène Jean-Pierre Miquel, Comédie-Française Salle Richelieu
- 1981 : Victor ou les Enfants au pouvoir de Roger Vitrac, mise en scène Jean Bouchaud
- 1981 : La Dame de chez Maxim de Georges Feydeau, mise en scène Jean-Paul Roussillon, Comédie-Française
- 1983 : Victor ou les Enfants au pouvoir de Roger Vitrac, mise en scène Jean Bouchaud, Comédie-Française au Théâtre national de l'Odéon
- 1984 : Le Suicidé de Nikolaï Erdman, mise en scène Jean-Pierre Vincent, Comédie-Française au Théâtre national de l'Odéon
- 1985 : La Tragédie de Macbeth de William Shakespeare, mise en scène Jean-Pierre Vincent, Festival d'Avignon
- 1987 : Esther de Racine, mise en scène Françoise Seigner, Comédie-Française au Théâtre national de l'Odéon, Théâtre de la Porte-Saint-Martin
- 1987 : Dialogue des Carmélites de Georges Bernanos d'après Gertrud von Lefort, Raymond Leopold Bruckberger, Philippe Agostini, mise en scène Gildas Bourdet, Comédie-Française à l'Opéra de Lille, au Théâtre de la Porte-Saint-Martin
- 1989 : Michelet ou le Don des larmes d'après Jules Michelet, mise en scène Simone Benmussa, Comédie-Française au Petit Odéon
- 1990 : L'Émission de télévision de Michel Vinaver, mise en scène Jacques Lassalle, Théâtre national de l'Odéon, Théâtre national de Strasbourg
- 1995 : Occupe-toi d'Amélie! de Georges Feydeau, mise en scène Roger Planchon, Comédie-Française
- 1997 : La Vie parisienne de Jacques Offenbach, mise en scène Daniel Mesguich

==== Hors Comédie-Française ====
- 1960 : Jean de la Lune de Marcel Achard, mise en scène Bernard Dhéran
- 1961 : Dommage qu'elle soit une putain de John Ford, mise en scène Luchino Visconti, Théâtre de Paris
- 1962 : George Dandin de Molière, mise en scène Daniel Leveugle, Théâtre de l'Alliance française
- 1963 : Les Amours de Palerme de Lope de Vega, mise en scène Daniel Leveugle, Festival du Languedoc
- 1968 : La guerre de Troie n'aura pas lieu de Jean Giraudoux, mise en scène Jean Darnel, Théâtre antique d'Arles
- 1968 : Britannicus de Racine, mise en scène Maurice Escande, Théâtre antique d'Arles
- 1974 : Macbett d'Eugène Ionesco, mise en scène Jacques Mauclair, Festival de Vaison-la-Romaine
- 1998 : L'Idiot d'après Fiodor Dostoïevski, mise en scène Jacques Mauclair et Gérard Caillaud, Théâtre 14 Jean-Marie Serreau
- 1999 : L'Idiot d'après Fiodor Dostoïevski, mise en scène Jacques Mauclair et Gérard Caillaud, Théâtre de la Madeleine
- 2003 : Hamlet de William Shakespeare, mise en scène Jean-Luc Jeener, Théâtre du Nord-Ouest
- 2007 : Laisse flotter les rubans de Jacqueline de Romilly, mise en scène Philippe Rondest, Théâtre des Mathurins
- 2008 : Les femmes savantes de Molière, mise en scène Colette Teissèdre, Théâtre du Nord-Ouest
- 2009 : Les Cahiers de Malte Laurids Brigge de Rainer Maria Rilke, mise en scène Bérengère Dautun, Théâtre de la Huchette
- 2010 : Les Cahiers de Malte Laurids Brigge de Rainer Maria Rilke, mise en scène et adaptation Bérengère Dautun, Petit Hébertot
- 2011 : Refuge pour temps d'orage de Patrick de Carolis, mise en scène et adaptation Bérengère Dautun, Petit Hébertot
- 2012 : J'accuse d'après Émile Zola, adaptation de Bérengère Dautun, mise en scène de Xavier Jaillard, Petit Hébertot
- 2013 : Dans le regard de Louise de et avec Georges Dupuis, mise en scène Yves Pignot, Théâtre Le Ranelagh
- 2014: Comtesse de Ségur née Rostopchine, Théâtre Le Ranelagh
- 2015 : Comtesse de Ségur née Rostopchine, Théâtre Comédie Bastille
- 2016 : Je l'appelais Monsieur Cocteau
- 2017: Compartiment fumeuse, Studio Hébertot
