= Jean-Pierre Miquel =

French actor and theatre director

- Born: 22 January 1937; Neuilly-sur-Seine, France
- Died: 22 February 2003 (aged 66); Vincennes, France
- Occupations: Actor, theatre director

Jean-Pierre Miquel (22 January 1937 – 22 February 2003) was a French actor and theatre director, as well as an administrator of the Comédie française.

== Biography ==
Artistic director at the Théâtre de l'Odéon from 1971 to 1977, he becomes managing director of the Conservatoire national supérieur d'art dramatique from 1982 to 1993 and administrator of the Comédie française from 1993 to 2001.

In 1985, as director of the Conservatoire national supérieur d'art dramatique de Paris, he organised a great exhibition of paintings by Dolores Puthod devoted to the Commedia dell'Arte and wrote articles published in the "Catalogo generale delle Opere di Dolores Puthod".

== Actor ==
- 1965: El Greco by Luc Vilsen, directed by Georges Vitaly, Théâtre du Vieux-Colombier
- 1975: Suréna de Corneille, directed by Jean-Pierre Miquel, Théâtre de l’Odéon
- 1980: La Malédiction after Seven Against Thebes by Aeschylus, The Phoenician Women by Euripides and Antigone by Sophocles, directed by Jean-Pierre Miquel, Festival d'Avignon
- 1982: Night and Day de Tom Stoppard, directed by Jacques Rosner, Maison de la Culture André Malraux Reims, Nouveau théâtre de Nice

== Theatre director ==
- 1964: Suréna by Pierre Corneille, Théâtre Récamier
- 1965: Cinna by Pierre Corneille, Théâtre Récamier
- 1965: Oreste by Vittorio Alfieri, Arras puis Théâtre Récamier
- 1966: Le Cid by Pierre Corneille, Théâtre Antoine
- 1967: Horace by Pierre Corneille, Théâtre des Variétés
- 1967: La Butte de Satory by Pierre Halet, Théâtre de Chaillot, reprise Théâtre Récamier
- 1968: Renaud et Armide by Jean Cocteau, Amiens
- 1969: Spectacle des auteurs contemporains 5 pièces en un acte réunissant : Pierre Halet, Guy Foissy, Rixe de Jean-Claude Grumberg, Victor Haïm, Fernando Arrabal, Maison de la Culture d'Amiens
- 1969: L'Étoile de Séville by Félix Lope de Vega, Festival de Théâtre baroque de Montauban
- 1969: La Malédiction (1st version), montage of texts by Aeschylus, Sophocles, Euripides, Paris and provinces
- 1970: Antigone by Bertolt Brecht, Amiens
- 1975: Dom Juan by Molière with le Jeune Théâtre National, provinces
- 1980: La Malédiction after Seven Against Thebes by Aeschylus, The Phoenician Women by Euripides and Antigone by Sophocles, Festival d'Avignon
- 1981: Les Vacances by Jean-Claude Grumberg, Centre dramatique de Reims
- 1983: Le Roi Victor by Louis Calaferte
- 1984: La double inconstance by Marivaux, Conservatoire national d'art dramatique and tour in the USA
- 1984: Le Fauteuil à bascule by Jean-Claude Brisville, maison de la Culture de Loire-Atlantique Nantes
- 1985: La Bataille de Waterloo by Louis Calaferte, Studio des Champs-Elysées
- 1985: The Collection by Harold Pinter, centre dramatique national de Reims
- 1988: Les Sincères by Marivaux, Rencontres d'été de la Chartreuse de Villeneuve-lès-Avignon (students of the Conservatoire National Supérieur d’Art Dramatique)
- 1989: Le Souper by Jean-Claude Brisville, Théâtre Montparnasse
- 1990: L’Officier de la garde by Ferenc Molnár, Comédie des Champs-Élysées
- 1991: L'Antichambre by Jean-Claude Brisville, Théâtre de l'Atelier

=== Théâtre de l’Odéon ===
- 1972: Le Comte Oderland by Max Frisch, troupe of the Comédie-Française
- 1972: La Grande Muraille by Max Frisch
- 1972: Antigone by Bertolt Brecht, troupe of the Comédie-Française
- 1973: C’est la guerre, M. Grüber by Jacques Sternberg, troupe of the Comédie-Française
- 1973: Chez les Titch by Louis Calaferte, troupe of the Comédie-Française, Petit-Odéon
- 1974: La Catin aux lèvres pouces by René Clair
- 1975: Othon by Pierre Corneille
- 1975: Suréna by Pierre Corneille, Petit-Odéon
- 1976: Don Juan ou l’amour de la géométrie by Max Frisch
- 1976: Trafic by Louis Calaferte, troupe of the Comédie-Française, Petit-Odéon
- 1976: Mo by Louis Calaferte, Petit-Odéon
- 1977: Uncle Vanya by Anton Chekhov
- 1981: Tu as bien fait de venir, Paul by Louis Calaferte, Petit-Odéon
- 1982: Hedda Gabler by Henrik Ibsen
- 1982: Le Fauteuil à bascule by Jean-Claude Brisville, Petit-Odéon, Studio des Champs-Elysées
- 1985: L'Entretien de M. Descartes avec M. Pascal le jeune by Jean-Claude Brisville, Petit-Odéon, Théâtre Moderne
- 1986: The Just Assassins by Albert Camus

=== Comédie-Française ===
- 1970-1971 : Soirées littéraires : Auteurs nouveaux : Femmes parallèles by François Billetdoux et Cœur à deux by Guy Foissy
- 1971: Horace by Pierre Corneille
- 1972: Graf Öderland by Max Frisch
- 1972: Antigone by Bertolt Brecht
- 1973: C'est la guerre, Monsieur Gruber by Jacques Sternberg
- 1978: Britannicus by Jean Racine
- 1981: Sertorius by Pierre Corneille
- 1983: La Seconde Surprise de l'amour and La Colonie by Marivaux
- 1987: Old Times by Harold Pinter, Théâtre du Petit-Montparnasse
- 1994: Comment va le monde, môssieu ? il tourne, môssieu ! by François Billetdoux, Théâtre national de la Colline
- 1995: Double Inconstancy by Marivaux
- 1996: Les Fausses Confidences by Marivaux
- 1996: Les Derniers Devoirs by Louis Calaferte, Théâtre du Vieux-Colombier
- 1997: L'Alerte by Bertrand Poirot-Delpech, Théâtre du Vieux-Colombier
- 1997: Texts by Bertolt Brecht, lecture Studio-Théâtre de la Comédie-Française
- 1998: Euphonia by Hector Berlioz, création musicale de Michaël Levinas, Théâtre du Vieux-Colombier
- 1998: Paroles de théâtre by Louis Jouvet, Comédie-Française
- 1998: Le Legs by Marivaux, Comédie-Française
- 2000: Le Misanthrope by Molière, Théâtre du Vieux-Colombier
- 2001: Textes de Louis Jouvet, lecture Comédie-Française
- 2002: Hedda Gabler by Henrik Ibsen, Théâtre du Vieux-Colombier

== Filmography ==
=== Cinema ===
- 1969: Z (by Costa-Gavras) – Pierre – un avocat
- 1972: L'Étrangleur (by Paul Vecchiali) – Le commissaire principal
- 1975: Section spéciale( by Costa-Gavras) – Alec Mellor, l'avocat d'Émile Bastard
- 1982: All Fired Up (by Jean-Paul Rappeneau) – Le ministère de l'Économie et des finances
- 1985: Bras de fer (by Gérard Vergez) – (voice)
- 1990: Tatie Danielle (by Étienne Chatiliez) – Doctor
- 1990: Lacenaire (by Francis Girod) – Le président du tribunal
- 1992: Max et Jérémie (by Claire Devers) – Maubuisson
- 1993: Hélas pour moi (by Jean-Luc Godard) – L'autre pasteur
- 1998: Terminale (by Francis Girod) – Le Proviseur (final film role)

=== Television ===
- 1984: Raison perdue (by Michel Favart) – Charles Mornant
- 1989: L'Ingénieur aimait trop les chiffres (by Michel Favart) – Aubertet
- 1995: Les Alsaciens ou les Deux Mathilde (by Michel Favart) – Baron Kempf
- 1997: Un homme digne de confiance (de Philippe Monnier) – Le procureur
