= Jean Gillibert =

French psychiatrist and playwright

Jean Gillibert (1925 – 31 October 2014) was a French psychiatrist, psychoanalyst, poet, translator, playwright and theatre director.

== Short biography ==
Gillibert graduated from the Paris conservatory in 1945. In 1947, he attended a lecture by Antonin Artaud at the Théâtre du Vieux-Colombier in Paris, which had a decisive influence on his career, under the sign of the exploration of madness and theater. A part of his career was devoted to psychoanalysis.

Gillibert died on 31 October 2014 in his home in Bourg-la-Reine.

== Filmography ==
- 1962: The Trial of Joan of Arc by Robert Bresson
- 1963: La Meule by René Allio
- 1983: Le Général a disparu by Yves-André Hubert
- 1985: Le Monde désert by Pierre Beuchot

== Theatre ==
=== Actor ===
- 1950: Adam exilé written and directed by Johan de Meester, Théâtre Hébertot
- 1950: Lucifer written and directed by Johan de Meester, Théâtre Hébertot
- 1959: Tête d'or written by Paul Claudel, directed by Jean-Louis Barrault, Odéon-Théâtre de France
- 1962: The Idiot written by Fyodor Dostoyevsky, directed by Jean Gillibert, Théâtre Récamier
- 1967: Phèdre by Racine, directed by Jean Gillibert, Châteauvallon-Scène nationale
- 1971: A Midsummer Night's Dream written by William Shakespeare, directed by Jean Gillibert, Chateauvallon
- 1971: Les Ombres sur la mer written by William Butler Yeats, directed by Jean Gillibert, Chateauvallon
- 1971: L'Entrée dans la baie et la prise de la ville de Rio de Janeiro en 1711 written by Jean Ristat, directed by Jean Gillibert, Chateauvallon

=== Director ===
- 1956: Medea by Euripides, Théâtre de l'Alliance française
- 1957: Athalie by Racine, Théâtre Récamier
- 1958: Horace by Corneille, Théâtre de l'Alliance française
- 1962: The Idiot by Fyodor Dostoyevsky, Théâtre Récamier
- 1962: Oedipus Rex by Sophocles, Théâtre Récamier
- 1964: Romeo and Juliet by William Shakespeare, Festival du Marais Hôtel de Béthune-Sully
- 1964: Oedipus Rex and Oedipus at Colonus by Sophocles, Théâtre Récamier
- 1965: Phèdre by Racine, Théâtre Récamier, 1967: Châteauvallon, 1968: Festival de Nancy
- 1967: The Persians by Aeschylus, Châteauvallon
- 1967: La Sonate des spectres by August Strindberg, Théâtre de l'Alliance française
- 1968: L'Échange by Paul Claudel, Châteauvallon
- 1969: Les Cenci by Antonin Artaud, Châteauvallon
- 1969: Le Gardien du tombeau after Franz Kafka, Rencontres de Châteauvallon
- 1970: The Misanthrope by Molière, Châteauvallon
- 1970: Life Is a Dream by Pedro Calderón de la Barca, Châteauvallon
- 1971: The Misanthrope by Molière, Théâtre de la Cité internationale
- 1971: A Midsummer Night's Dream by William Shakespeare, Chateauvallon
- 1971: Les Ombres sur la mer by William Butler Yeats, Chateauvallon
- 1971: L'Entrée dans la baie et la prise de la ville de Rio de Janeiro en 1711 by Jean Ristat, Chateauvallon
- 1972: La Celestina by Fernando de Rojas, Châteauvallon, Théâtre de l'Ouest parisien Boulogne-Billancourt
- 1973: Penthesilea by Heinrich von Kleist, Châteauvallon
- 1974: Bajazet by Racine, Petit Odéon
- 1976: The Dance of Death by August Strindberg, Festival du Marais Théâtre Essaïon
- 1978: Oresteia by Aeschylus, Châteauvallon
- 1979: Finnegans Wake by James Joyce, Théâtre Marie Stuart
- 1980: Phèdre by Racine, Festival de Sarlat
- 1980: Finnegans Wake by James Joyce, Théâtre de la Cité internationale
- 1980: Président Schreber : Fragments de délire by Jean Gillibert, after Freud and Daniel Paul Schreber, Théâtre de la Cité internationale
- 1980: The Dance of Death by August Strindberg, Théâtre de la Cité internationale
- 1981: Le Personnage combattant by Jean Vauthier, Théâtre de la Cité internationale
- 1981: Phèdre by Racine
- 1981: Les Quatre Petites Filles by Picasso, Centre Georges Pompidou
- 1981: Medea by Euripides, Festival d'Avignon Comédie-Française
- 1981: Lectures autour de Médée after Sigmund Freud, artistic director Jean Gillibert, Comédie-Française Festival d'Avignon
- 1981: L'Âne by Victor Hugo, Festival d'Avignon
- 1981: Lectures autour de Médée by Sigmund Freud
- 1981: Notes from Underground by Fyodor Dostoyevsky, Théâtre de la Huchette
- 1982: Mother Courage and Her Children by Bertolt Brecht, Maison des arts et de la culture de Créteil
- 1983: Le ciel est par-dessus le toit by Louis Gay, Festival d'Avignon off
- 1984: Le Babil des classes dangereuses by Valère Novarina, Théâtre de la Criée
- 1984: La Petite Apocalypse by Tadeusz Konwicki, Enghien-les-Bains
- 1985: Le borgne est roi by Carlos Fuentes, Théâtre Marie Stuart
- 1986: Vautrin after Honoré de Balzac, directed with Jean-Claude Penchenat, Théâtre du Campagnol Châtenay-Malabry
- 1987: Fait-divers by Frédérique Ruchaud, Théâtre national de Chaillot
- 1987: Baba-Puzzle by Claude Morand
- 1988: King Lear by William Shakespeare, Maison de la Culture de Bourges, Théâtre du Lierre
- 1980: Finnegans Wake by James Joyce, lecture Festival d'Avignon
- 1988: Lieutenant Gustl by Arthur Schnitzler, Théâtre du Lavoir Pontarlier
- 1989: Death in Venice after Thomas Mann
- 1989: Psychomachies by Jean Gillibert, Théâtre de la Cité internationale
- 1990: Mithridate by Racine
- 1990: Rahab by Claude-Henri Rocquet
- 1990: Entre rêve et réalité after Luigi Pirandello, Fernando Pessoa, Antonio Tabucchi, Théâtre Denis Hyères
- 1990: Jeanne d'Arc au bûcher by Paul Claudel, Festival de Saint-Céré
- 1991: Demons by Fyodor Dostoyevsky
- 1992: W comme Gombrowicz by Claude Bernhardt
- 1992: Paulina 1880 by Pierre Jean Jouve
- 1992: Oreste by Vittorio Alfieri, Maison des arts et de la culture de Créteil
- 1993: Lili de Liliane Rovère
- 1994: Les Cheveux d'Absalon by Pedro Calderón de la Barca, lecture
- 1997: Le Rêve d'un homme ridicule by Fyodor Dostoyevsky
- 1998: The Brothers Karamazov after Dostoyevsky, Lavoir Moderne Parisien
- 1999: Le Mort-Homme by Jean Gillibert, Lavoir Moderne Parisien
- 1999: Athalie by Jean Racine, Granges de Port-Royal
- 2000: Les Barbares (trilogy Les Retranchés, Nécropolis, La Truite des anges) by Jean Gillibert, Lavoir Moderne Parisien
- 2001: Les Vagants by Jean Gillibert
- 2001: Medea after Euripides, Seneca the Younger, Pierre Corneille
- 2002: White Nights after Dostoyevsky
- 2002: Nuits chauves by Jean Gillibert
- 2003: L'Apprenti after Raymond Guérin
- 2003: La Mort d'Anna Karénine after Raymond Guérin after Leo Tolstoy

== Translations ==
- Medea by Euripides
- Oedipus Rex and Oedipus at Colonus by Sophocles
- King Lear by Shakespeare

== Books ==
- L'Œdipe maniaque : 4 volumes éditions Payot :
  - 1978: L'Œdipe maniaque
  - 1978: Une Quête phallique
  - 1979: Le Moi soulagé
  - 1979: L'Image réconciliée
- 1983: Les Illusiades, essai sur le théâtre de l'acteur, Clancier Guénaud
- 1985: Le Psychodrame de la psychanalyse, Champ Vallon 1985, ISBN 2-903528-54-3
- 1987: Ça n'est plus ça: Notes cliniques et métapsychologiques sur l'autre théâtre de L'Étre, Césura, Lyon
- 1990: Folie et création, Champ Vallon, ISBN 2-87673-109-6
- 1991: L'acteur en creation, Presses Universitaires Mirail-Toulouse
- 1992: Mœurs de nuit : Versets hérétiques, Presses Universitaires Mirail-Toulouse, ISBN 2-85816-183-6
- 1993: Dialogue avec les schizophrénies, collection "Fait psychanalytique", Presses universitaires de France
- 1994: Mes Référendes, L'Harmattan
- 1995: Conversions – Trois études de Métapsychanalyse : de Dieu, du Monde, de l'Homme, Calamnn-Lévy
- 1997: Plus béant que le temps, L'Harmattan (poetry)
- 2000: L'Esprit du théâtre, Éditions Phébus
- 2002: Nuits chauves. Légende d'un couple, Les éditions de l'Ambedui
- 2003: Phèdre et l'inconscient poétique, L'Harmattan
- 2004: Humeur, passion, pulsions : depuis que j'écoute..., L'Harmattan
- 2004: Jean sans terre, Phébus, ISBN 2-85940-950-5
- 2011: Jean Gillibert (2011). La mort à vif. L'Harmattan.

About Jean Gillibert

- 2004: Jean Gillibert ou l'autre théâtre, Marc-Olivier Sephiha & Jean Gillibert, Phébus 2004 (interviews)
- 2004: Présence de Jean Gillibert, Michèle Venard
