= Théâtre Récamier =

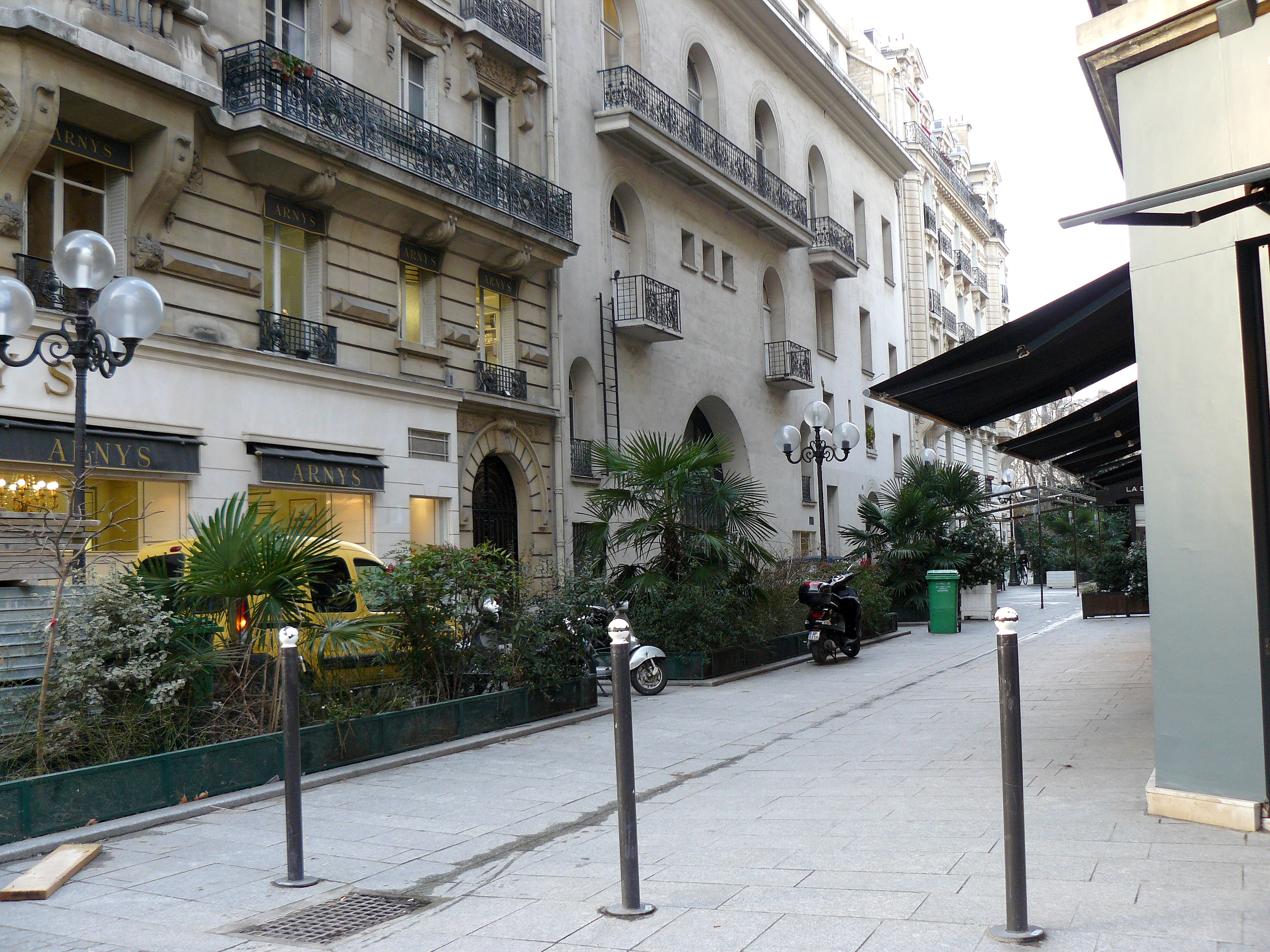
- The former theatre in the rue Récamier
- Interactive map of the Théâtre Récamier area

General information
- Location: 7th arrondissement of Paris, France
- Coordinates: 48.8522°N 2.3277°E
- Inaugurated: 1908

The théâtre Récamier was a Parisian theatre located at 3 rue Récamier in the 7th arrondissement of Paris, inaugurated in 1908 and closed in 1978.

== History ==
Originally, it was an entertainment venue built by Charles Blondel for the Ligue de l'enseignement on the location of the convent chapel of the Abbaye-aux-Bois.

From October 1959 to May 1961, the théâtre Récamier serves as second room of the TNP directed by Jean Vilar and located at palais de Chaillot.

In December 1965, Louis Aragon set up there the soirée " Six poètes et une musique de maintenant " (Six poets and a music of our time) in order to introduce new poets (Jacques Garelli, Pierre Lartigue, Jacques Roubaud, André Libérati, Maurice Régnaut and Bernard Vargaftig).

After the May 1968 events in France, the venue housed the compagnie Renaud-Barrault expelled from the Théâtre de l'Odéon. This troupe stayed in the place until 1975 when Antoine Bourseiller became director until the closure happened in 1978.

Rehearsal room of the Comédie-Française until 2008, it is currently undergoing a renovation project because of its age.

In 2013, Roman Polanski draws inspiration from the settings for the shooting of his Venus in Fur.

== Productions ==
- 1957: Athalie by Racine, directed by Jean Gillibert
- 1958: Lorsque cinq ans seront passés by Federico García Lorca, directed by Guy Suarès (November)
- 1959: The Killer by Eugène Ionesco, directed by José Quaglio (19 February)
- 1959: Le Crapaud-buffle d'Armand Gatti, Jean Vilar (22 October)
- 1959: Les Bâtisseurs d'empire by Boris Vian, directed by Jean Négroni (22 December)
- 1960: Les Femmes savantes by Molière, directed by Jean-Paul Moulinot
- 1960: Krapp's Last Tape by Samuel Beckett, directed by Roger Blin (22 March)
- 1960: Lettre morte by Robert Pinget, directed by Jean Martin (22 March)
- 1960: Génousie by René de Obaldia, directed by Roger Mollien (1 October)
- 1960: The Good Person of Szechwan by Bertolt Brecht, directed by André Steiger (2 December)
- 1960: La Louve by Robèrt Lafont, directed by Claude Vernick (8 December)
- 1961: Servant of Two Masters by Carlo Goldoni, directed by Edmond Tamiz (October)
- 1961: The Trojan Women by Euripides, directed by Jean Tasso (3 November)
- 1961: William Conrad by Pierre Boulle, directed by André Charpak (23 Novembre)
- 1962: Tilt by Philippe Curval, directed by Jean-Marie Serreau
- 1962: The Idiot by Fyodor Dostoyevsky, directed by Jean Gillibert (17 May)
- 1962: The Plough and the Stars by Seán O'Casey, directed by Gabriel Garran (20 October)
- 1962: Œdipus rex by Sophocles, directed by Jean Gillibert (21 November)
- 1962: The Fire Raisers by Max Frisch, directed by Jean-Marie Serreau (7 December)
- 1963: La Femme sauvage ou Le Cadavre encerclé by Kateb Yacine, directed by Jean-Marie Serreau (9 January)
- 1963: Les Officiers by Jakob Michael Reinhold Lenz, directed by Jean Tasso (16 February)
- 1963: L'École de dressage by Francis Beaumont and John Fletcher, directed by Yves Gasc (11 June)
- 1963: Le Printemps by Marc'O, directed by the author (16 July)
- 1963: Monsieur Vautrin by André Charpak after Honoré de Balzac, directed by André Charpak (27 September)
- 1963: Another Man's Wife by Fyodor Dostoyevsky, directed by André Charpak
- 1964: Sacco and Vanzetti by Mino Roli and Luciano Vincenzoni, directed by José Valverde
- 1964: The Marriage by Witold Gombrowicz, directed by Jorge Lavelli (8 January)
- 1964: Jacques le fataliste by Henry Mary after Diderot, directed by Edmond Tamiz
- 1964: Œdipus rex and Oedipus at Colonus by Sophocles, directed by Jean Gillibert
- 1964: Suréna by Corneille, directed by Jean-Pierre Miquel
- 1965: Cinna de Corneille, directed by Jean-Pierre Miquel
- 1965: Oreste by Vittorio Alfieri, directed by Jean-Pierre Miquel
- 1965: Le temps viendra by Romain Rolland, directed by Guy Kayat (20 February)
- 1965: Les Enchaînés by Eugene O'Neill, directed by Jorge Lavelli (10 March)
- 1965: Ubu roi by Alfred Jarry, directed by Victor Garcia (23 June)
- 1965: Les Amants maléfiques by Thomas Middleton and William Rowley, directed by Jacques Tourane (10 September)
- 1965: Les Zykov by Maxim Gorki, directed by Jean Leuvrais (4 November)
- 1965: Phèdre by Racine, directed by Jean Gillibert (8 December)
- 1966: Le Capitaine Fracasse by Théophile Gautier, adaptation Philippe Léotard, directed by Ariane Mnouchkine (21 January)
- 1966: The House of Bernarda Alba by Federico García Lorca, directed by Jacques Mauclair (28 février)
- 1966: Les Bouquinistes by Antoine Tudal, directed by Claude Confortès (19 April)
- 1966: Oh, What a Lovely War! by Charles Chilton and Joan Littlewood, directed by Pierre Debauche
- 1967: La Butte de Satory by Pierre Halet, directed by Jean-Pierre Miquel (26 September)
- 1967: Le Roi Faim by Leonid Andreïev, directed by Pierre Debauche (11 November)
- 1969: Happy Days by Samuel Beckett, directed by Roger Blin (9 September)
- 1970: Krapp's Last Tape by Samuel Beckett, directed by de l'auteur
- 1970: Waiting for Godot by Samuel Beckett, directed by Roger Blin (11 March)
- 1970: Actes sans paroles by Samuel Beckett, directed by Deryk Mendel (29 April)
- 1970: deathwatch by Jean Genet, directed by Alexandre Arcady (15 September)
- 1970: Happy Days by Samuel Beckett, directed by Roger Blin (7 October)
- 1970: La Mère by Stanisław Ignacy Witkiewicz, directed by Claude Régy (7 November)
- 1971: L'Amante anglaise by Marguerite Duras, directed by Claude Régy
- 1971: La Nuit des assassins by José Triana, Roger Blin (26 March)
- 1971: Le Personnage combattant by Jean Vauthier, directed by Roger Blin and Jean-Louis Barrault (1 October)
- 1971: Il ventaglio by Carlo Goldoni, directed by Luca Ronconi, Piccolo Teatro di Milano (20 novembre)
- 1972: Où boivent les vaches by Roland Dubillard, directed by Roger Blin (9 November)
- 1973: L'Ami des nègres by George Tabori, directed by Robert W. Goldsby (23 January)
- 1973: Le Métro fantôme by Leroi Jones, directed by Antoine Bourseiller
- 1973: Harold and Maude by Colin Higgins, directed by Jean-Louis Barrault (5 November)
- 1974: Sous le vent des îles Baléares by Paul Claudel, directed by Jean-Pierre Granval
- 1974: The Suicide by Nikolai Erdman, directed by Jean-Pierre Granval (6 February)
- 1975: Kennedy's Children by Robert Patrick, directed by Antoine Bourseiller (16 September)
- 1976: Barbe-bleue et son fils imberbe by Jean-Pierre Bisson, directed by the author (February)
- 1976: Der Turm by Hugo von Hofmannsthal, directed by Antoine Bourseiller (16 March)
- 1976: Encore un militaire by Jean-Pierre Bisson, directed by the author (17 May)
- 1976: Phèdre by Racine, directed by Antoine Bourseiller (17 November)
- 1977: The Sermons of Jean Harlow and the Curses of Billy the Kid by Michael McClure, directed by Antoine Bourseiller (22 September)
