= Falsch =

Falsch may refer to:

- Falsch (netlabel), an online subsidiary of electronic music label Mego
- Falsch (play), a 1980 play by René Kalisky
- Falsch (film), a 1987 film adaptation of Kalisky's play, directed by the Dardenne brothers
