= Guy Suarès =

Guy Suarès (1932 in Paris - February 1996) was a French actor, theatre director, theatre manager and critic.

== Mise en scène (selection) ==
- 1954 : Yerma by Federico García Lorca
- 1957 : Hedda Gabler : drama in 4 acts : comedy in 1 act, Henrik Ibsen - Léon Deutsch
- 1957 : Le temps est un songe by Henri-René Lenormand
- 1958 : When Five Years Pass by Federico García Lorca, Théâtre Récamier
- 1962 : L'Échange, Théâtre Hébertot
- 1964 : On ne badine pas avec l’amour (Alfred de Musset), Comédie de la Loire
- 1964 : L’Echange (Paul Claudel), Comédie de la Loire
- 1965 : Miguel Manara (O.V. de L Milosz), Comédie de la Loire
- 1967 : Le repoussoir (Rafael Alberti), Comédie de la Loire
- 1967 : The Chairs (Ionesco), Comédie de la Loire
- 1968 : Liberté, Liberté (Flavio Rangel and Millor Fernandes, adapt Guy Suares), Comédie de la Loire
- 1969 : Le barbier de Séville (Beaumarchais), Comédie de la Loire
- 1979 : Splendeur et mort de Joaquin Murieta de Pablo Neruda (adaptation)

== Books ==
- 1979 : La Mémoire oubliée: récit
- 1981 : Résidence sur la terre, Pablo Neruda, Julio Cortázar, Guy Suarès
- 1986 : Vladimir Jankélévitch, Guy Suarès, Vladimir Jankélévitch, La Manufacture, 1986

== Bibliography ==
- Malraux, La Voix de l'Occident, Stock, 1974
- Malraux, celui qui vient: entretiens entre André Malraux, Guy Suarès, José Bergamín, Éditions Stock, 1979
