= Louis Calaferte =

French novelist (1928–1994)

Louis Calaferte (French pronunciation: [lwi kalafɛrt]; 14 July 1928 - 2 May 1994) was an Italian-born French naturalized novelist. He was born in Turin, Italy, but emigrated to France with his parents when he was very young, settling in a Lyon suburb where he spent the majority of his childhood and adolescence. In 1947, he set out for Paris to pursue his dream of becoming an actor, where he found a love for writing instead. Over the span of his career, he published a variety of works, including “a fantastic profusion of novels, short stories, essays, plays, poems and erotica of a particularly distinguished vulgarity that created genuine excitement in the most blase connoisseur”. This writing style resulted in a variety of literary prizes, including the Prix de l’Academie Française for Ebauche d’un autoportrait in 1983; for a collection of poems, Londoniennes in 1985; and for a collection of short stories, Promenades dans un parc in 1987. Calaferte died in Dijon, France on 2 May 1994.

== Early life ==
In his early teens, Calaferte worked as an errand boy in a battery factory and later began work as a general laborer. During this time, he enjoyed reading books; subsequently, in 1947 he moved to Paris, where he got a job at Odéon - Théâtre de l'Europe (formerly the Théâtre de l’Odéon) as a theatre extra. It was then and there that he wrote his first plays. One of them was performed at a preview performance at Théâtre d'Angers, earning him a standing ovation at the age of twenty.

== Career ==
With the support of his “literary hero” Joseph Kessel, he had Requiem des innocents published by Éditions Julliard in 1952. This work was a culmination of childhood memories in which Calaferte’s rebellious writing style began to emerge. This first book had great success and was soon followed by the publication of Partage des vivants (The Lot of the Living) in 1953. These two youthful works would be severely criticized by the author twenty five years later. He is quoted as saying : “If I had to name two of my books that I loathe, it would be the first two; I would gladly see them disappear”.

In 1956, he moved to Mornant in the Monts du Lyonnais, where he wrote Septentrion, a work accused of being pornographic, and which was consequently censored and banned from being sold. It was reprinted only twenty years later, on the initiative of Gérard Bourgadier at Éditions Denoël, a French publishing house. In this largely autobiographical and erotic novel, Calaferte uses first-person narrative to recount the wanderings of a novice writer, his time spent secretly reading while working as a laborer (as a child, the protagonist would hide in public toilets, reading there very happily), and his encounters with women. The most important female figure in the novel is without a doubt Nora, a Dutch woman who represents female emancipation and social success. Calaferte continued to regularly publish collections of poems and stories of an intimate and sensual nature; some of these were dreamlike and strange, and they were often linked to childhood. His plays explored the theme of family relations, using both a humorous and troubling tone. According to director Patrick Pelloquet, “ Louis Calaferte’s characters are more of a stereotype for certain behavior than characters in the strictest sense of the word”.

Until 1974, Calaferte worked for a Lyon radio station and at ORTF (Office de Radiodiffusion-Télévision Française). He spent the last years of his life near Dijon, in the village of Blaisy-Bas with his wife. Among his friends, he was closest to writer Georges Piroué and theatre director Jean-Pierre Miquel. Miquel described Calaferte’s work as “honest, harsh and capable of crazy rhetoric, [while] never straying away from the psychological reality of its characters.” He added that it was “a well-rounded work - perfect, precise, deeply moving and amusing.” Miquel said his friend Calaferte was a private and friendly person, someone who always spoke his mind and whose work was distinguished by its harshness. Calaferte’s notebooks also present his audience with another aspect of the author’s artistic personality, demonstrating his passion for painting and his literary inspiration, which derives from the works of numerous established thinkers, including Paul Léautaud and Franz Kafka.

Despite being often overlooked by his peers, Louis Calaferte produced powerful and personal works. Among them was The Way It Works with Women (1992) (La méchanique des femmes), an unclassifiable short novel he published two years before his death, which was adapted for the screen in 2000 by Jérôme de Missolz; however, it did not experience great success. Calaferte reflected on his life as an author, saying:

“For having written so much between the ages of thirteen and twenty, having presented two plays in Paris, and having my first book published at age of twenty-two, I deem myself to be talented beyond my years...The development of my thoughts and my ability to understand only flourished as I gradually matured over the years.”

Over the course of his career, Calaferte produced hundreds of works, mainly poetry and short story collections, as well as plays and notebooks. Louis Calaferte died on 2 May 1994 in Dijon, France. His wife, Guillemette, has proposed to the municipality her willingness to donate Calaferte’s work to the city, provided that there is a place dedicated to him. She has continued to publish the previously unseen volumes of his notebooks.

== Works ==
=== Novels ===
Requiem des innocents, 1952, publisher: Collection Folio (No 3388) (2000), Gallimard, (ISBN 2070410013)
Partage des vivants, 1953
Septentrion, 1963, publisher: Collection Folio (No 2142) (1990), Gallimard, (ISBN 2-07-038227-3)
No man's land, 1963, publisher: Collection L'Arpenteur, Gallimard, (ISBN 2070772683)
Satori, 1968, publisher: Collection Folio (No 2990) (1997), Gallimard, (ISBN 2070403483)
Rosa mystica, 1968, publisher : Collection Folio (No 2822) (1996), Gallimard, (ISBN 2070400212)
Portrait de l'enfant, 1969, publisher: Collection Romans français (1981), Denoël, (ISBN 2207202933)
Hinterland, 1971, publisher: Collection Romans français, Denoël, (ISBN 2207213455)
Limitrophe, 1972, publisher: Collection Romans français, Denoël, (ISBN 220721723X)
La vie parallèle, 1974, publisher: Collection Documents actualité, Denoël, (ISBN 2207220516)
Épisodes de la vie des mantes religieuses, 1976, publisher: Collection Romans français, Denoël, (ISBN 2207222519)
Voyage stellaire, 1977
Campagnes, 1979, publisher: Collection Romans français, Denoël, (ISBN 2207225712)
Ébauche d'un autoportrait, 1983, publisher: Collection Romans français, Denoël, (ISBN 2207228541)
Un riche, trois pauvres, 1986, publisher: éditions Hesse - (ISBN 9782950406170)
L'Incarnation, 1987, publisher: Collection Romans français, Denoël, (ISBN 2207234037)
Promenade dans un parc, 1987, publisher: Collection Romans français, Denoël, (ISBN 2207233367)
Memento mori, 1988, publisher: Collection L'Arpenteur, Gallimard, (ISBN 2070780007)
Maître Faust, 1992, publisher: Collection L'Arpenteur, Gallimard, (ISBN 2070759547)
La Mécanique des femmes, 1992, publisher: Collection L'Arpenteur, Gallimard, (ISBN 2070388638)
C'est la guerre, 1993, publisher: Collection L'Arpenteur, Gallimard, (ISBN 2070736326)
Le Monologue, 1996, publisher: Collection L'Arpenteur, Gallimard, (ISBN 2070743926)
Droguerie du ciel, 1996, publisher: Hesse éditions, (ISBN 291127203X)
Le sang violet de l'améthyste, 1998, publisher: Collection L'Arpenteur, Gallimard, (ISBN 2070752119)
Suite villageoise, 2000, publisher: Hesse éditions, (ISBN 2911272315)

=== Essays ===
Les sables du temps, Éditions Le tout pour le tout, Paris, 1998
Droit de cité, 1992, Éditions Manya, Folio Gallimard (no 2670), 1995, (ISBN 207038702X)
L'homme vivant, Gallimard, L'arpenteur, 1994, (ISBN 2070740021)
Perspectives, illustrations de l'auteur, Éditions Hesse, 1995, (ISBN 295040619X)
Art-Signal, Éditions Hesse, 1996, (ISBN 9782911272042)
Les fontaines silencieuses, publisher: Collection L'Arpenteur, Gallimard, 2005, (ISBN 2070772675)

=== Notebooks ===
Le chemin de Sion (1956-1967), Carnets, Denoël, 1980, (ISBN 2207226239)
L'or et le plomb (1968-1973), Carnets II, Denoël, 1981, (ISBN 2207227685)
Lignes intérieures (1974-1977), Carnets III, Denoël, 1985, (ISBN 2207231232)
Le Spectateur immobile (1978-1979), Carnets IV, Gallimard, L'arpenteur, 1990 (ISBN 2070780244)
Miroir de Janus (1980-1981), Carnets V, Gallimard, L'arpenteur, 1993, (ISBN 2070736318)
Rapports (1982), Carnets VI, Gallimard, L'arpenteur, 1996 (ISBN 2070743934)
Étapes (1983), Carnets VII, Gallimard, L'arpenteur, 1997, (ISBN 2070750221)
Trajectoires (1984), Carnets VIII, Gallimard, L'arpenteur, 1999, (ISBN 2070755614.)
Écriture (1985-1986), Carnets IX, Gallimard, L'arpenteur, 2001, (ISBN 2070763633)
Bilan (1987-1988), Carnets X, Gallimard, L'arpenteur, 2003, (ISBN 2070767787)
Circonstances (1989), Carnets XI, Gallimard, L'arpenteur, 2005, (ISBN 2070772691)
Traversée (1990), Carnets XII, Gallimard, L'arpenteur, 2006, (ISBN 2070776883)
Situation (1991), Carnets XIII, Gallimard, L'arpenteur, 2007, (ISBN 9782070783144)
Direction (1992), Carnets XIV, Gallimard, L'arpenteur, 2008, (ISBN 978-2-07-011960-8)
Dimensions (1993), Carnets XV, Gallimard, L'arpenteur, 2009, (ISBN 9782070125562)
Le jardin fermé (1994), Carnets XVI, Gallimard, L'arpenteur, 2010

=== Plays ===
Aux armes, citoyens !, Baroquerie en un acte avec couplets 1986, Collection Romans français, Denoël, (ISBN 2207232735)
Théâtre complet, Éditions Hesse, 4 volumes (Pièces intimistes, 1993 et Pièces Baroques I, II et III, 1994, 1996 pour le dernier (23 pièces au total)

=== Poems ===
Rag-Time, 1972, publisher: Collection Romans français, Denoël, (ISBN 2207217248)
Paraphe, 1974, publisher: Collection Romans français, Denoël, (ISBN 2207220524)
Londoniennes, 1985
Décalcomanies, 1987
A.B.C.D., Enfantines, avec les illustrations de Jacques Truphémus, Éditions Belle-fontaine, 1987
Haïkaï du jardin, 1991, publisher: Collection L'Arpenteur, Gallimard, (ISBN 2070780392)
Les métamorphoses du révolver, 1993
Ouroboros, 1995
Non-lieu, 1996
Pile ou face, 1996
Terre céleste, 1999
Imagerie, magie, 2000

=== Other works ===
Une vie, une déflagration (entretiens avec Patrick Amine), Denoël, 1985
L’Aventure intérieure, (entretiens avec Jean-Pierre Pauty), Éditions Julliard, 1994
Choses dites, Entretiens et choix de textes, le Cherche Midi, 1997
Correspondance 1969-1994, avec Georges Piroué, éditions Hesse, 2001

== Awards ==
Prix Ibsen for the play "Les Miettes" (1978)
Prix Lugné Poe (1979)
Grand Prix de la littérature Dramatique de la Ville de Paris for his entire theatrical work (1984)
Grand Prix national des lettres (1992)
