= Antoine Vitez =

French actor, director, and poet

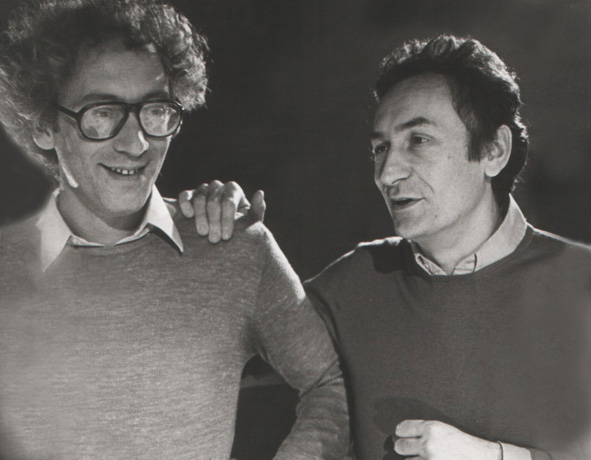
- René Kalisky with Antoine Vitez (right)
- Born: 20 December 1930; Paris, France
- Died: 30 April 1990 (aged 59); Paris, France
- Education: Tania Balachova
- Known for: Theatre director, stage director

Antoine Vitez (French pronunciation: [ɑ̃twan vitɛz]; 20 December 1930 – 30 April 1990) was a French actor, director, and poet. He became a central character and influence on the French theater in the post-war period, especially in the technique of teaching drama. He was also translator of Chekhov, Vladimir Mayakovsky and Mikhail Sholokhov.

== Early life ==
Antoine Vitez was born in Paris and trained to be an actor, finding his first acting job at the age of 19 in Ils attendent Lefty at the Théâtre Maubel. He failed to enter the National Conservatory of Dramatic Art in Paris and became a Communist activist, which he continued until 1979, when he left the Communist Party following the invasion of Afghanistan by the USSR.

He met Louis Aragon in 1958 and became his private secretary from 1960 to 1962. He worked in the theater Balachova Tania, and wrote reviews published by Jean Vilar in the magazine Théâtre populaire. Vitez also found work reading on the radio and voice-dubbing in films. He had his first opportunity as director with Sophocles' Electra at the Maison de la Culture de Caen in 1966.

== Career ==
Vitez' production of Electra was successful and he continued directing with Russian and Greek repertoire, directing Mayakovsky's Les Bains in 1967, Eugene Schwartz's Le Dragon in 1968, and Chekhov's La Mouette in 1970. After this initial period, he began working more with French and German repertoire, directing works by Racine, Jakob Lenz, Goethe, Brecht and René Kalisky. He later expanded his work to both traditional and classical theatrical repertoire, including Sophocles, Shakespeare, Marivaux, Molière, Jean Racine, Paul Claudel, Vladimir Mayakovsky, Pierre Guyotat, Jean Metellus and Jean Audureau.

Vitez became a professor at the National Conservatory of Dramatic Arts in 1968, and in 1972 he founded the Théâtre des Quartiers d'Ivry. In the same year, he founded the Ateliers d'Ivry workshop, where amateurs and professionals could share a common theatrical practice. He became director at the Chaillot National Theatre in 1981, and was appointed deputy head of the Comédie Française in June 1988, a post he held until his sudden death in Paris in 1990. In 1978, Vitez' workshop sessions were recorded by film-maker Maria Koleva, who made five films on different workshop sessions.

== Aesthetic ==
Vitez often presented his plays in locations with non-theatrical elements and without any descriptive function, employing an aesthetic of "free play" and "association of ideas," according to Georges Banu. Vitez' work required thought on the part of the audience, more than the reality of a set. He saw the theater as a "force field" and demanded an "elitist theater for all." He defended the great classical texts as "sunken galleons," works that were remote, archaic and mythological.

== Legacy ==
- Théâtre Antoine Vitez on the campus of the University of Provence, now Aix-Marseille University is named for him.
- Théâtre d'Ivry Antoine Vitez in Ivry-sur-Seine, is also named for him.

== Filmography ==
Year	Title	Role	Notes
1966	The War Is Over	Un employé Pan-am / Pan-Am Employee	
1969	My Night at Maud's	Vidal	
1970	La nuit bulgare		
1970	The Confession	Un ami communiste	
1976	Les Ambassadeurs		
1976	Antoine Vitez s'amuse avec Claudel et Brecht	Himself	
1978	The Green Room	Bishop's secretary	
1978	Le barbouillé ou la mort gaie	Le professeur	
1979	Écoute voir	Le délégue de la secte	
1979	Je parle d'amour	Le comédien de Tartuffe	
1989	Hiver 54, l'abbé Pierre	Le ministre de l'intérieur Léon Martinaud-Déplat	(final film role)
1991	Paroles tues ou Aimer en étrangère à Paris	Himself	
