= Graf Öderland =

Drama by Max Frisch, premiered in 1951

Graf Öderland, subtitled A Moritat in Twelve Pictures, is a drama by the Swiss writer Max Frisch. Inspired by a newspaper report, Frisch wrote his first prose sketch in 1946, which was published the following year as part of Tagebuch mit Marion (Diary with Marion). Frisch adapted the material several times for the theatre. The premiere of the first drama version took place on 10 February 1951 at the Schauspielhaus Zürich, directed by Leonard Steckel, and was Frisch's first failure on stage. Frisch's second adaptation, staged on 4 February 1956 by Fritz Kortner at the Kleines Haus der Städtischen Bühnen Frankfurt, had a stronger political emphasis. With the third and final version, Frisch largely returned to his original diary sketch. It premiered on 25 September 1961 at the Schiller Theatre in Berlin, directed by Hans Lietzau, and was included in Frisch's collected works published in 1975. Although all three stage adaptations were unsuccessful with critics and audiences alike, Graf Öderland remained the drama with which Frisch felt most connected. He described it as his favourite and most mysterious play.

The plot begins with the seemingly senseless murder of a conscientious bank clerk who kills a caretaker with an axe. Only the public prosecutor shows any understanding of the crime, which inspires him to break out of his orderly life. From then on, he follows the legend of Count Öderland, roaming the countryside with an axe in his hand and killing anyone who stands in the way of his claim to freedom. Supporters rally behind the leading figure of Count Öderland, and the prosecutor's individual act escalates into general unrest. The rebellion ultimately leads to a political upheaval, without the prosecutor achieving the freedom he longs for. Characteristic of Count Öderland is the blending of private and political motives, which can be traced back to two main themes in Frisch's work: the longing to break free from social constraints and a growing criticism of the bourgeois order.

== Contents ==
=== Final version ===
1st image: A public prosecutor has had enough: Public prosecutor Martin gets up in the middle of the night because he cannot stop thinking about the case of an axe murderer. He sees the crime, which was committed without motive, as an escape from the monotony of everyday life, as an indictment of a life that consists only of deferred hope. While his wife, Elsa, turns away from him in incomprehension, the young maid Hilde joins him, burns his files on his instructions, and tells him the legend of Count Öderland.

2nd image: The murderer: In his prison cell, murderer Wolfgang Schweiger talks to his solicitor, Dr. Hahn, who is angry about his client's confession. Schweiger, who cannot explain his actions himself, felt understood for the first time during the public prosecutor's interrogation. He recounts the events of the evening of the crime: after a dutiful working life at the Bank Union, he naturally made his way to the bank on his day off, Sunday, when he felt the urge to use the toilet. The caretaker Karl-Anton Hofmeier let him in, they had a friendly chat, Schweiger joked that Hofmeier should be killed, grabbed his axe, and put his words into action. In the end, Dr. Hahn receives news that the trial scheduled for the following day has been postponed because the public prosecutor is missing.

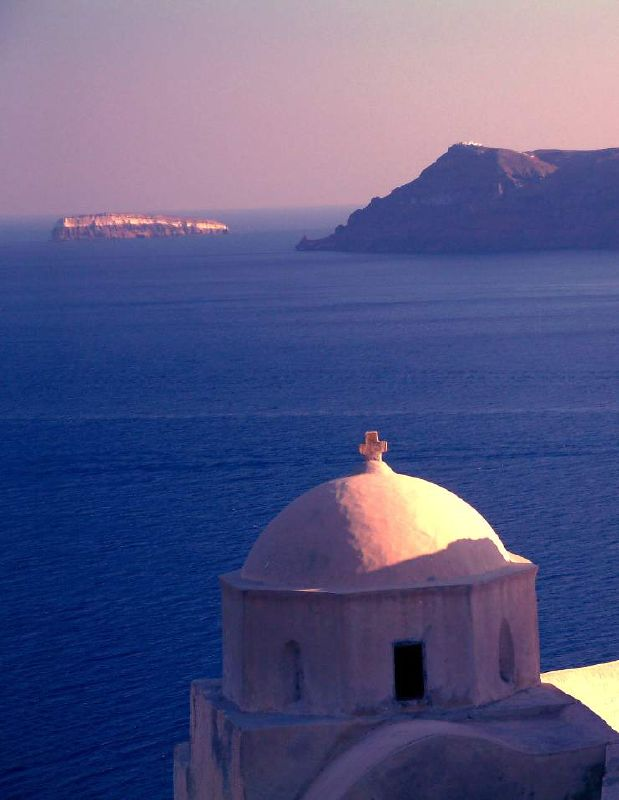
Santorini as a dream destination

3rd image: The prosecutor comes to his axe: A charcoal burner lives with his wife and daughter, Inge, in a hut in the snow-covered forest. Inge dreams of the legend of Count Öderland, who will one day come with his axe and free her from her father's yoke. Suddenly, the prosecutor stands at the door and is let in. He talks to Inge, who reminds him of Hilde, about his longing to sail to Santorini. Inge asks him to take her with him. When the prosecutor grabs the charcoal burner's axe, everyone recognises him as the legendary Count. Inge recites the ballad of Count Öderland with the axe in her hand. Anyone who stands in their way will fall.

4th image: The first message arrives: Dr. Hahn and Elsa have commissioned Mr. Mario, a clairvoyant from the cabaret, to search for clues about the missing public prosecutor. When Elsa's secret love affair with Dr. Hahn is revealed, an image of the public prosecutor with an axe in his hand appears before the clairvoyant's eyes. Then a report comes in on the radio that an unknown person has killed three constables with an axe.

5th image: Long live the Count: A group of charcoal burners in the forest get drunk and celebrate. They cheer the public prosecutor in the guise of Count Öderland. He has shown them the way to a better life. But they realise that, at his behest, they have merely been living off their supplies. When these are used up and the public prosecutor finds himself questioned by the charcoal burners, he leaves them and rides away with Inge after setting fire to the charcoal burners' houses.

6th image: Life imprisonment: In his cell, the murderer recounts his life, which was dominated by work and duty. Friday evening was the highlight of every week, while Sunday afternoon was already overshadowed by the prospect of returning to work on Monday. He finds comfort in the fact that the caretaker, who was ignored by everyone during his lifetime, has become so important since his death.

7th image: The axe catches on: In a grand hotel, a policeman wants to question Count Öderland, who is allegedly staying there. He reports that many are following his example, setting off to obtain axes. Elsa and Dr. Hahn appear in disguise. They suspect that the public prosecutor is hiding behind Count Öderland's mask and pretending to be the seller of a yacht with which the public prosecutor wants to set sail for Santorini. They only show pictures of the yacht, which reminds the public prosecutor of his toy model, about which he often daydreamed. After signing the contract, the yacht turns out to be the very toy model, the participants drop their masks, and the prosecutor sees his suspicion confirmed that his wife is having an affair with Dr. Hahn. He pulls the axe out of his briefcase, and everyone flees.

8th image: The murderer is lucky: The murderer is interrogated in his cell by representatives of society: the Home Secretary, the Director, the General, and the Commissioner. They are looking for the starting point for the social unrest that has gripped the country in his crime. The axe has become a symbol of the uprising. A gang has gathered around Count Öderland. The murderer has no answers to their questions about the background to the crime. He is released under an amnesty, which Schweiger later reinterprets as a general amnesia.

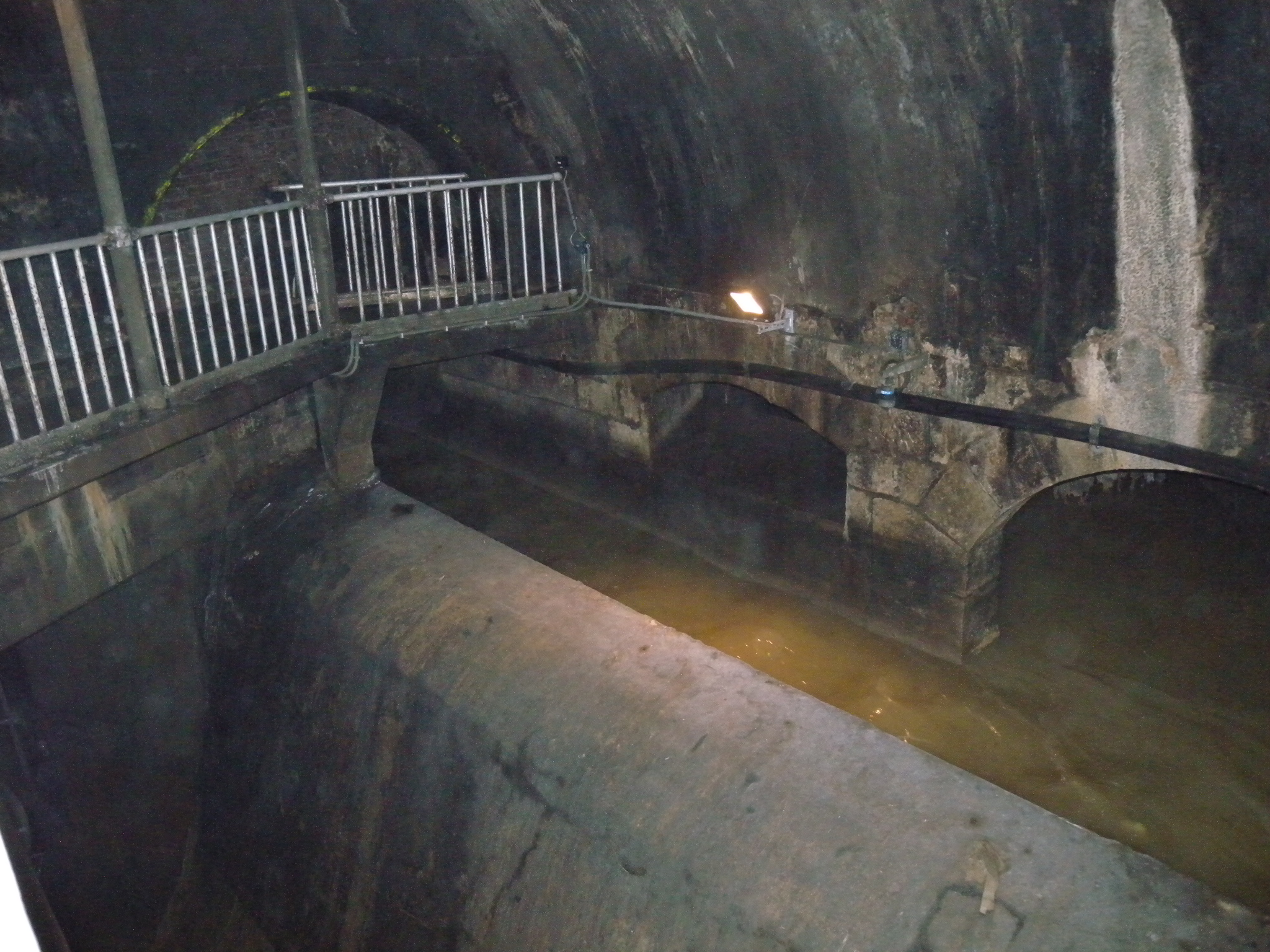
Vienna's sewer system, the model for the sewer scene

9th image: The Count must surrender: The Count's gang is hiding in the sewer system. They have been given an ultimatum: hand over their leader by midnight or the sewers will be flooded. Several of his loyal followers now turn against the prosecutor. He saves himself without regard for his followers and leaves the sick Inge behind in the sewer system.

10th image: Masters of the situation: The government is celebrating a gala at the residence when the public prosecutor arrives with his briefcase. While the government is hampered by the dishes from the standing reception in their hands, he proposes an alliance: they should hand over the residence to him, and the people will rejoice. The interior minister refuses, saying he will fight to the last drop of blood. Coco, who has already played the role of first lady of the state alongside many men, steps forward and proves her instinct for future power by joining the public prosecutor. She leads the public prosecutor onto the balcony, where the people pay homage to him.

11th image: The murderer is unlucky: The murderer sleeps with his victim's widow while unrest in the city grows. When a window breaks, the policeman notices it. He enters the widow's attic room and refuses to be persuaded by the murderer's amnesty. When the murderer tries to escape, the policeman shoots him with his submachine gun.

12th image: Peace and order are restored. Conclusion: The prosecutor is back in his office. He talks to Hilde and believes that he has only been dreaming. But fires are blazing outside the windows, and shots can be heard repeatedly. Finally, the president appears and hands over power to the prosecutor. The prosecutor refuses, saying that he has no message. The president insists: those who overthrow power in order to be free will ultimately achieve the opposite of freedom, namely, power. The prosecutor is desperate and imagines that he has only dreamed it all. He vainly conjures up his awakening.

=== Previous versions ===
According to Frisch's own assessment, the first version from 1951 focuses primarily on the private sphere, the public prosecutor's longing to break free. It consists of only ten scenes. Compared to the final version, the fifth scene was not yet included, and the sixth and eighth scenes still form a single unit. In the sewers, a confrontation ensues between the prosecutor and Inge, which ends in Inge's suicide. Iris, the daughter of his commander, is another woman who sides with the prosecutor. The murderer is not in love with the widow, but with the maid Hilde. When the public prosecutor finally realises that his outburst has caused social unrest, but his private life remains unchanged, that he is unable to love Coco, and that Elsa and Dr. Hahn are waiting for him in his villa as usual, he jumps out of the window in despair. Frisch later commented: "Suicide out of embarrassment on the part of the author."

In the second version from 1956, Frisch placed greater emphasis on current political references. It consists of eleven scenes. The jury trial against the murderer is presented first. After the public prosecutor has obtained the axe, his murders of three gendarmes are depicted. The charcoal burners greet him with their axes; the subsequent scene with the charcoal burners is omitted. The confrontation between the prosecutor and Elsa and Dr. Hahn is omitted. Against his will, the prosecutor is appointed leader of a party, and Inge is shot by mutinous revolutionaries. After the state leadership has sworn an oath to the prosecutor, he transfers the office of the prime minister to Dr. Hahn. Then he takes the liberty of leaving. After deciding to stop killing, the prosecutor accuses himself of his crimes and sentences himself to death. He leaves with the words: "Freedom is only one step away." Before his execution takes place, the curtain falls.

== Form ==
Max Frisch had originally planned Graf Öderland as a ballad with song verses between the scenes, but the musical interludes were deleted before the premiere. The remaining structure is reminiscent of a Station drama. The theme of social upheaval is also familiar from expressionism, but Frisch distributes it between two protagonists, with the actions of one inspiring the escape of the other. Manfred Durzak called the sequence of scenes an "epic picture book" that plays out on two parallel plot lines that relate to each other contrapuntally: the level of the public prosecutor and that of the murderer. The plot is repeatedly elevated to a general, parabolic level. Nevertheless, Frisch does not intend to create an enlightening parable or a demonstrative didactic piece. In his effort to explore the direction of an idea to its conclusion, he ends without a clear interpretation, leaving an open ending, which is why Michael Butler described Graf Öderland as a "game of thought or consciousness."

The first and last scenes of the play, set in the prosecutor's villa, are clearly rooted in reality. They form a contrasting framework for the interior scenes, which, without any reference to time or place, are reminiscent of a fairytale world. Max Frisch described in a staging instruction that "the more the play progresses, the more it enters a so-called fantastical space: the audience should only confront the story with our reality once they know it in its entirety." Although Graf Öderland does not have a narrator in the traditional sense, Hilde and Inge take on this role in parts of the first and third scenes. According to Frisch's instructions, the roles of Hilde, Inge, and Coco are played by the same actress as a single "type." An exception was the 1956 version, in which Frisch assigned Coco to the actress playing Elsa.

== Interpretation ==
=== Social criticism and reference to Switzerland ===
For Sonja Rüegg, Graf Öderland marked a turning point in Frisch's work, as it was the first time he openly took a stand against bourgeois society. Three characters—the public prosecutor, Inge, and the murderer—demonstrate the escape from a hierarchically organised, capitalist social order. The cause of the rebellion lies in Inge's poverty, in the murderer's alienated work, and in the public prosecutor's self-realisation, which is made impossible by social constraints. The prosecutor, a figure with whom the audience identifies until, in the course of the play, they become detached from him due to the increasing cruelty of his actions, reveals to the audience the "Öderländische" (Öderlandian) in everyone, which is latent in every bourgeois society and can break out. In the end, the outbursts prove to be pointless, as the power hierarchy itself is not called into question. Although the open ending of the drama does not point the way to a life free of domination, it does not negate the demands made earlier.

Manfred Durzak saw Graf Öderland as a step forward from Frisch's earlier plays, which remained thematically stuck in the longing for personal self-realisation and fulfilment in love. However, he argued that the play's socio-political message was repeatedly "obscured by metaphor." Thus, the romantic outburst not only turns into a revolution, but ultimately becomes a farce that, without any ideological message, stands under the mere advertising symbol of the axe. Frisch evades utopian precision and takes refuge in negation and legendary generality, which Durzak attributed to a lack of political reflection and a reluctance to engage in concrete action. By re-establishing power in a cycle at the end of the play, Frisch unintentionally becomes ideological and postulates the futility of any political change. In conclusion, Durzak saw Graf Öderland falling significantly behind role models such as Ernst Toller's Human mass in terms of its historical significance.

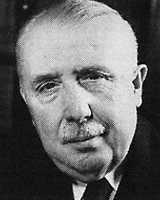
Eduard von Steiger

According to Rüegg, because the Öderland ideology is deliberately vague and lacking in substance, characterised solely by a rejection of the status quo, it can be applied to various political systems and ideologies, from fascism to communism. In the bourgeois state's response to the Öderland threat, the adoption of totalitarian methods for the supposed protection of society, references to Switzerland are recognisable, ranging from intellectual national defence during the threat of National Socialism to the fear of communist infiltration and the State Security Act in the early 1950s. The character of the Minister of the Interior, for example, is based on the former Federal Councillor Eduard von Steiger.

With his criticism of Switzerland as the prototype of a bourgeois society, Frisch opposed the contemporary image of Switzerland and its often-emphasised special historical role. The reaction was an almost unanimous rejection on the part of Swiss critics. Although Frisch's later works retained the critical stance of Graf Öderland, Rüegg believed that the misleading reception of the play had had an effect. Frisch's social criticism subsequently became more concrete, and his examination of his homeland more direct. For example, the successful novel Stiller was no longer set in a model state but named Switzerland directly.

=== Dream, transformation, and drama of consciousness ===
In addition to social criticism, most interpretations focused on the character of the public prosecutor, whose dualism of order and desire for freedom, as well as the blending of the realms of dream and reality. From a psychoanalytical perspective, Barbara Rowińska-Januszewska saw Count Öderland as the prosecutor's unconscious alter ego. In the forest, which symbolises the protagonist's psyche, the prosecutor strays from the familiar paths of his consciousness into the labyrinth of unconscious forces. The trigger is the charcoal burner's daughter, Inge, whose conversation puts the public prosecutor into a hypnotic-like trance. In the count's identity, the public prosecutor's lifelong suppressed urge gains the upper hand: the longing for freedom. Martin loses all moral and social inhibitions associated with his existence as a public prosecutor. At the same time, in his new identity, he proves incapable of feelings and attachments toward other people. The cesspool-like underworld of the sewer system, the exact opposite of the dreamt-of purity and clarity of the sea around Santorini, becomes a symbol of the public prosecutor's shattered psyche. In the end, the split in his consciousness repeats itself, and Martin returns to his identity as a public prosecutor. All that remains of the crimes he has committed is a vague idea and no sense of responsibility. The vitiosus circle of his lack of freedom closes.

For Marianne Biedermann, the altered references to time and place in the third image marked the transition from reality to dream. The chronological sequence of events in the first image is now transformed into subjective, extended, or endless states of time and memory. Spatially, too, the snow erases the real traces of the public prosecutor, and he enters a dream world. However, accepting the mythical identity of Count Öderland does not lead to freedom for the public prosecutor, but to a new form of bondage, a role into which others project their hopes. First, it is Inge who hopes for liberation from Öderland, later the Köhler family and the band of rebels. In the process, Martin increasingly loses the dreamt-of timelessness and placelessness in his role as Öderland, and the bonds of concrete temporal and spatial references increase. In the end, Martin is unable to awaken from the role of Öderland. The projection of all the characters has made the figure of the count a reality. Instead of communicating with each other, they have jointly created a myth whose violence is now turning against them.

Manfred Jurgensen saw the public prosecutor as merely a passive observer. His transformation into the character of Count Öderland was similar to that of Gregor Samsa in Kafka's Metamorphosis. The metamorphosis into Count Öderland was brought about by the dual character of Hilde-Inge, whom the public prosecutor referred to as fairies. For Walter Schmitz, this double fairy became the anima that lured the hero into an archetypal enchanted forest where he had to prove himself. After the absurd murder in the first scene had caused a rift in the public prosecutor's bourgeois world, the play continued as a drama of consciousness in which the supposed spatial escape actually led into the public prosecutor's consciousness.

In the seventh scene, which Schmitz considers the climax and turning point of the drama, the spiritual and real worlds collide. Disillusioned in his desire to break free, the public prosecutor has no choice but to fight for his inner aspirations through social struggle. However, the pathos of the public prosecutor is constantly mocked by the cyphers laid out before him: the yacht named Esperanza turns out to be a knick-knack, and the long-extinct volcano on Santorini thwarts the longed-for escape. Even as Count Öderland, the public prosecutor, does not succeed in escaping from the desolate land, all that arises around him is a "deserted story," the ballad of a ballad singer.

The search for the meaning of life degenerates into a new order of life in which the axe is no longer a symbol, but is rummaged out of the briefcase or stowed away in it like a document as needed. In the end, it is not Öderland who seizes power, but power that seizes him. In the final exclamation, "I was dreamed!", the longed-for realisation of individual dreams becomes the dream of "one," a collective living an alienated life from which the public prosecutor is unable to awaken.

=== Assembly and influences ===
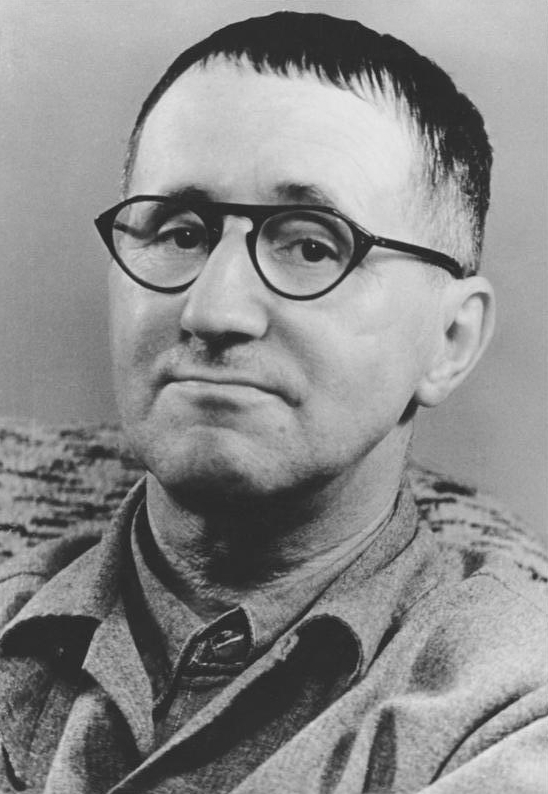
Bertolt Brecht (1954)

For Walter Schmitz, Frisch constructed the myth of Count Öderland using a montage in the style of Brecht's epic theatre. The public prosecutor attempts to counter his unease with culture by piecing together a role from the culture of the educated middle classes, and it is precisely this contradiction that makes him a tragicomic figure. The title Öderland refers to the poem The Waste Land by T. S. Eliot, but is no more than a mere reminiscence of the theme of boredom, which dates back to Büchner's Leonce and Lena. There is a close thematic relationship to the expressionist drama of escape and proclamation. Frisch's protagonists are reminiscent of the cashier in Georg Kaiser's Von morgens bis mitternachts (From Morning till Midnight). Set pieces such as the count's gang refer to Schiller's Räuber (The Robbers), while the sewer scene is taken from the film Der dritte Mann (The Third Man). In the theoretical underpinning of the public prosecutor's cultural criticism, Frisch refers to Freud's Civilisation and Its Discontents and the writings of C. G. Jung. The image of the Öderland in every human being takes up a slogan by Max Picard about the "Hitler in us."

Parallels were also often drawn with Bertolt Brecht, whom Frisch had consulted for the production. Marianne Biedermann recognised the song of Seeräuber-Jenny from the Threepenny Opera in Inge's Moritat vom Grafen Öderland, in which a ship also arrives and, after a violent demonstration of power, rescues a young woman from a miserable existence. Hellmuth Karasek emphasized the similarity between Graf Öderland and Brecht's parable of the seizure of power, The Resistible Rise of Arturo Ui. Both plays simplify political events, with Brecht seeking the political cause of crime in economics and Frisch seeking it romantically in orderly everyday life and spiritual atrophy, which Karasek exaggeratedly described as "a specifically Swiss variation on the theme of politics and crime."

=== The general and the private ===
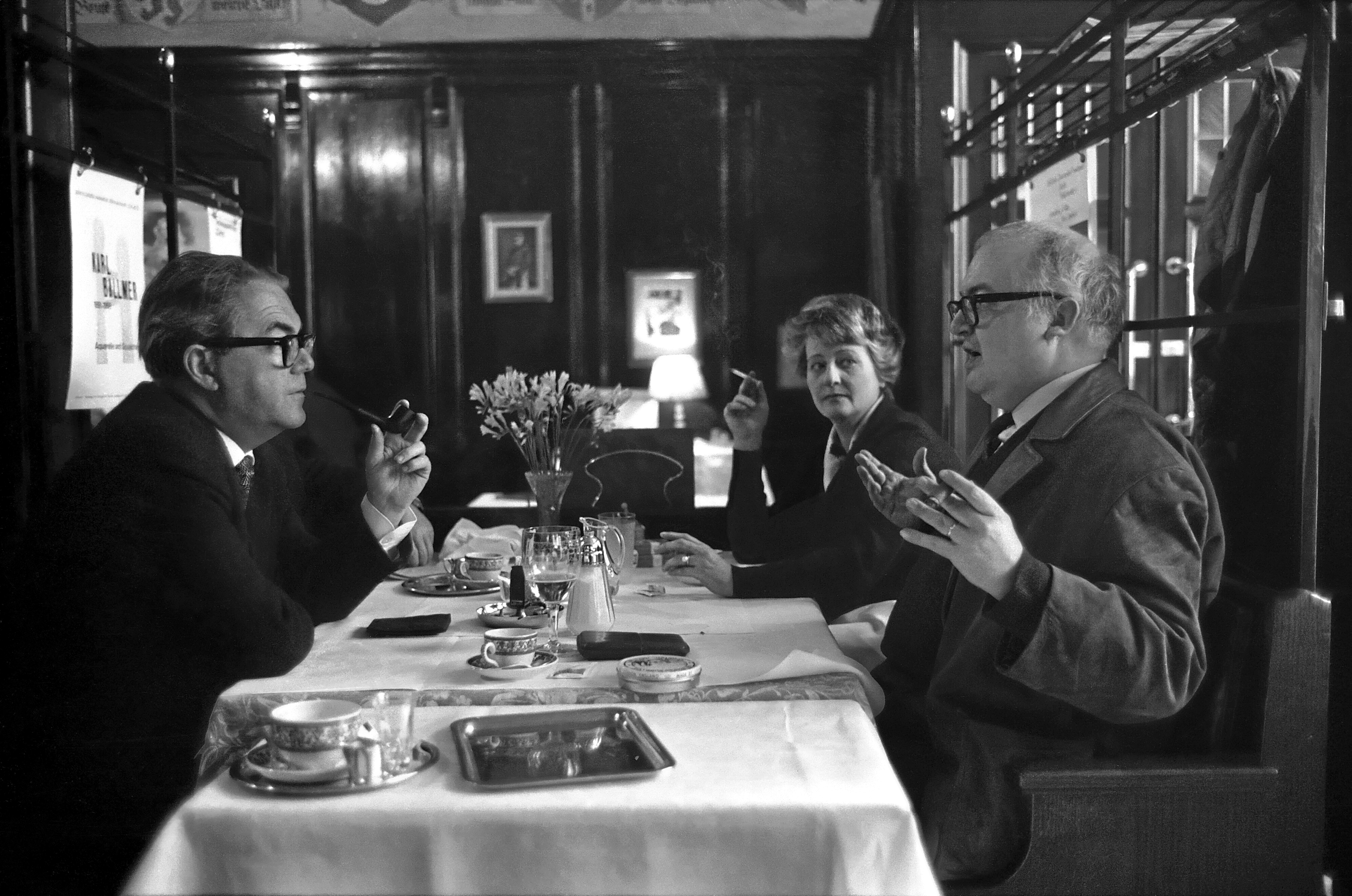
Max Frisch and Friedrich Dürrenmatt at the Kronenhalle in Zurich (1961)

A criticism repeatedly cited in connection with Graf Öderland is that of Friedrich Dürrenmatt, which he first addressed to his colleague in a letter and repeated in a review in Weltwoche in 1951. Dürrenmatt contrasted the principles of the public and the private as examples of a fundamental conflict in the play. Count Öderland, as Frisch had invented him in his prose sketch, was nothing more than a name, a myth, a principle, a mere mechanism: "Öderland is an axe and nothing more. An axe does not think, does not feel disgust, it murders." His actions are guided neither by conscience nor by an idea; they are pure desperation that transcends the question of their meaning: "A fall into nothingness is an event that transcends meaning or meaninglessness." However, this principle cannot be brought to the stage. By placing Count Öderland on stage, Frisch gave him the face of an actor and the fate of a public prosecutor, thereby weakening and distorting the character: "It was no longer Count Öderland who failed. It was the strange case of a certain public prosecutor who met with an accident." The particular replaces the general, an original motif replaces a mythical figure: "The play remains stuck in the private sphere; it belongs to Frisch alone." Dürrenmatt concluded: "The bold undertaking has failed."

In a letter to Dürrenmatt, Frisch contradicted his interpretation of the material: He had not put the mythical figure of Count Öderland on stage, but rather an Everyman in whom he was reflected: "A private individual, Mr. Martin, comes to regard himself temporarily as Count Öderland, what we have seen with our own eyes is not Count Öderland, the mythical figure, but rather the Öderlandian in an ordinary man named Martin, a public prosecutor." A response to Dürrenmatt's "death sentence" for the play was written by Jean Rudolf von Salis, who saw Graf Öderland as a successful dramatic work of art, while Dürrenmatt, "coming from his a priori," had given "ideological value judgements priority over artistic ones." Von Salis saw "something extremely questionable" in the rise of Count Öderland. But Frisch was merely reflecting the issues of his time; his Öderland was "the embodiment of the anarchy latent in every highly developed civilization." Integrated into the social order, the public prosecutor "ceased to be human out of sheer conscientiousness and righteousness" until he ultimately "became inhuman in order to be human." Frisch displayed "the relentlessness of a true tragedian when he demonstrated the insolubility of the conflict in the peripeteia at the end."

Later studies often took a position on the controversy between the two Swiss playwrights. For Alexander Stephan, Frisch's response tended to confirm rather than refute Dürrenmatt's analysis. Walter Schmitz, on the other hand, perceived in Dürrenmatt's criticism his disappointment that Frisch had written his own play and not Dürrenmatt's. Michael Butler also recalled that the confrontation with Count Öderland was reminiscent of Dürrenmatt's later conception of his own demonic character, the psychiatrist in Die Physiker (The Physicists). Hellmuth Karasek emphasised the dilemma that the stage often provides characters with motives and motivations of their own that run counter to the author's original intention. In Graf Öderland, he identified this in the role of the murderer, whose random act is given a retrospective motive through his love affair with the widow. Urs Bircher saw the central problem of the play as being that an antisocial and apolitical private search for happiness is transformed into the negative model of a political revolution, thereby calling into question both private and social motives. Manfred Jurgensen praised "Frisch's ability to deal simultaneously with the problem of individual identity and communal position."

== History of origin ==
=== First diary sketches ===
The starting point for the Öderland material can be found in two entries in Frisch's diary from 1946, each of which is based on newspaper reports. The first is about a former professor of Frisch's from Zurich, "a sober and controlled man," who disappeared one day. After a fruitless search, a clairvoyant from a cabaret was consulted, who claimed to be able to see the professor lying not deep in the water among the reeds. The man was then found in Greifensee, where he had shot himself.

The second entry is about a cashier, described as a "good and faithful" man, who woke up one night and killed his entire family with an axe. He could not give a reason for doing so. Frisch concluded by saying that one hoped it was a case of embezzlement, "as assurance that such confusion, which reveals the uninsured nature of human beings, can never afflict us." This was followed by a prose sketch, Am See (At the Lake), in which Frisch describes a morning interruption to his commute to work by a detour to a nearby lake. The hours of freedom gained leave him with a guilty conscience when he thinks of the hundreds of thousands behind their desks. He wonders "why we don't just leave." People must be deprived of the hope of the end of the working day, the weekend, the next time, the hereafter: "great would be the horror, great and real the transformation."

This resulted in a nearly 40-page prose sketch entitled Der Graf von Öderland (The Count of Öderland), which already anticipates key motifs and scenes from the play. It contains images 2 to 8 of the later final version, but remained a fragment. In a work report, Frisch admitted: "I didn't know how to continue." The prose sketch was first published in 1947 as part of Tagebuch mit Marion (Diary with Marion). In 1950, Frisch republished it in the expanded Tagebuch 1946–1949 (Diary 1946–1949), which formed the basis of much of his early work. This was followed in 1983 by another publication entitled Der Graf von Öderland. 1. Fassung. Skizze (The Count of Öderland. 1st version. Sketch) as a bibliophile annual gift from the Literary Association of Braunschweig to its members.

=== Premiere ===
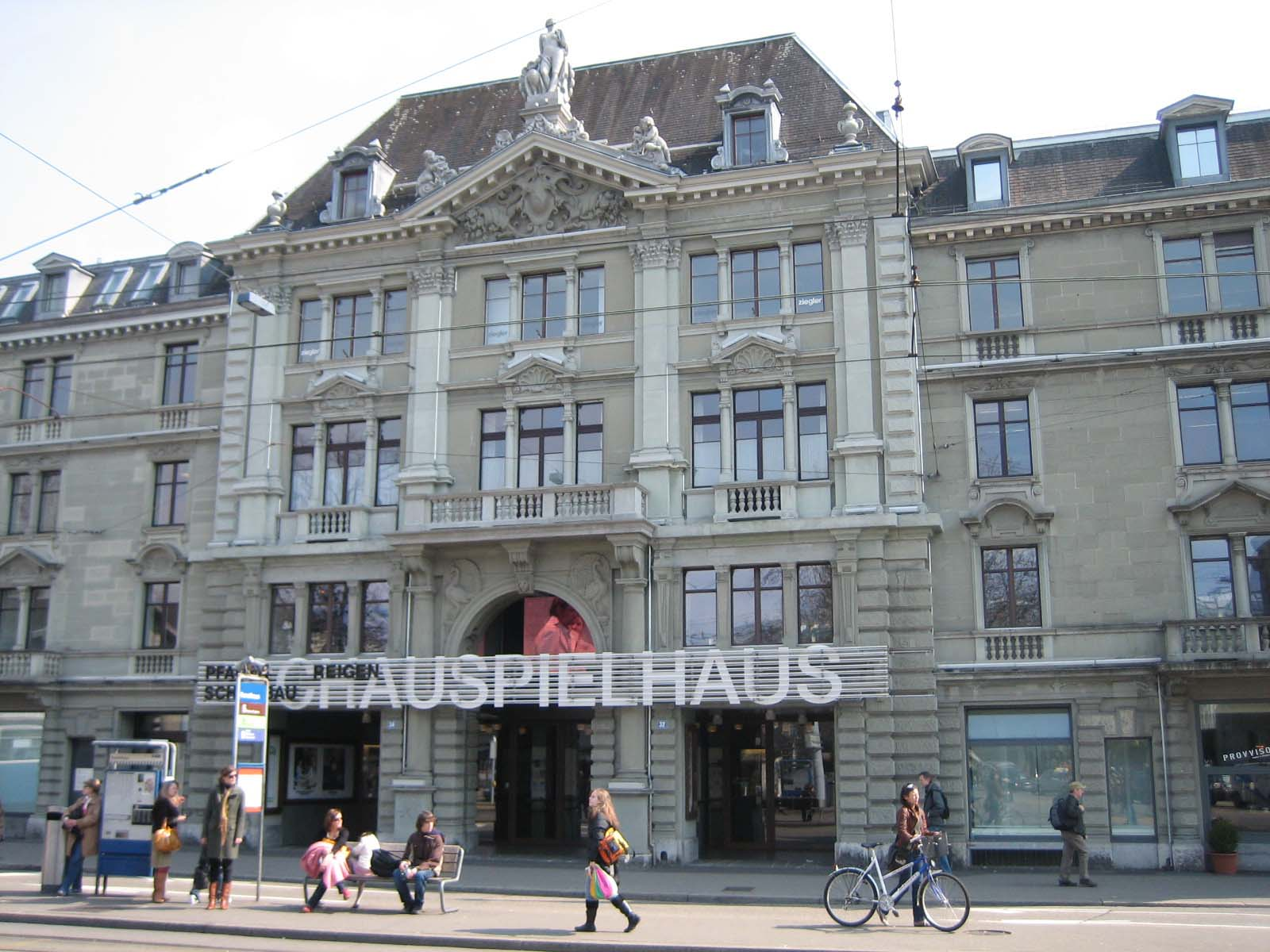
The Schauspielhaus Zurich, where Graf Öderland premiered and was taken off the programme after a month.

In January 1950, when Max Frisch presented his new play at a reading evening organised by Suhrkamp Verlag, he had completed the first four scenes of Graf Öderland. The first galley proofs were available in October. Difficulties arose during rehearsals with the ballad that was to be performed between the scenes. After Brecht, who had been asked for advice, was also unable to come up with a convincing solution, Frisch cut the ballad after the final rehearsal. It had "completely fragmented the play." Between the scenes, neon signs were now shown, accompanied by jazz music. The premiere took place on 10 February 1951 at the Schauspielhaus Zürich, directed by Leonard Steckel. The set design was by Teo Otto, and the leading role was played by Gustav Knuth. The book edition Graf Öderland. Ein Spiel in 10 Bildern (Count Öderland. A Play in 10 Scenes) was published in February 1951 by Suhrkamp Verlag.

The final performance of Graf Öderland took place at the Zurich Schauspielhaus on 7 March. The play was taken off the programme after receiving poor reviews and low audience numbers. Frisch responded with a letter to the management, enclosing a short memorandum on "Graf Öderland." In it, he complained about the insufficient rehearsal period, a weak cast, and the lack of loyalty shown to him by the Schauspielhaus. Frisch attributed the play's failure to the bias of the invited premiere guests and the dominance exercised by a small number of critics in the Zurich press. He expressed his suspicion "that there are certain circles in Zurich that could not tolerate the success of a new Frisch play from the outset." As a result, Frisch was more reserved in his collaboration with the Zurich Schauspielhaus. He had his next play, Don Juan oder Die Liebe zur Geometrie (Don Juan or The Love of Geometry), premiered simultaneously in Berlin, as he considered an exclusive premiere in Zurich too risky.

=== Revisions ===
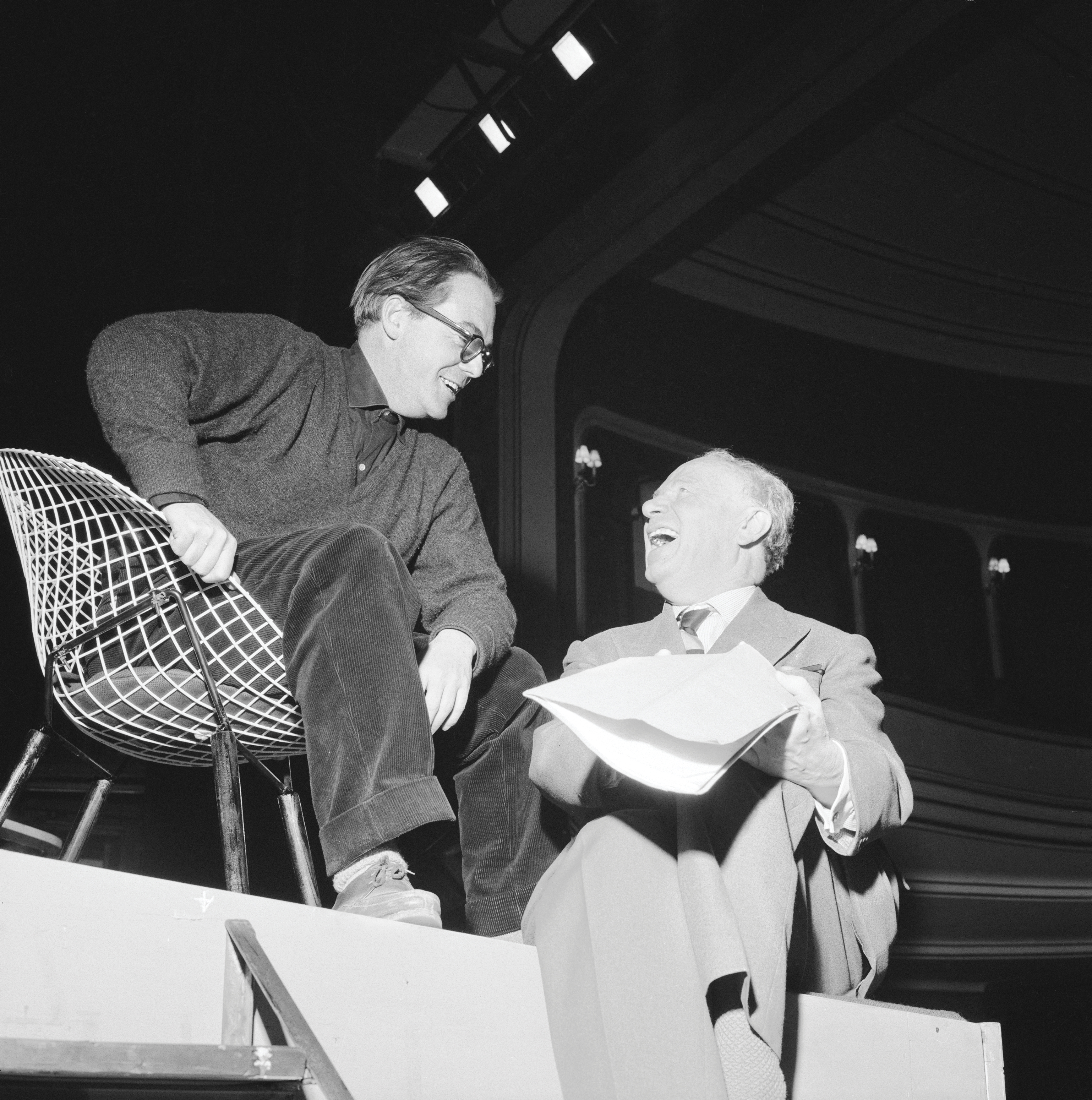
Max Frisch during rehearsals for Biedermann and the Arsonists (1958)

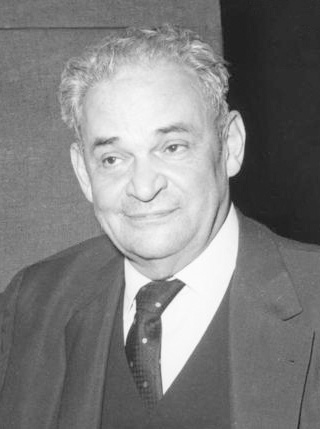
Fritz Kortner (1959)

The impetus for the revision of Graf Öderland came from outside. In 1955, Harry Buckwitz, the artistic director of the Städtische Bühnen Frankfurt, became interested in the play. In mid-November, Frisch and director Fritz Kortner held their first working meeting; by the end of the year, the new version was complete. The premiere took place on 4 February 1956. Teo Otto was once again responsible for the stage design, and Bernhard Minetti played the public prosecutor. In the programme for the premiere, Frisch spoke of "a lively, genuine, and free collaboration between director and author," which had been "an inspiring experience" for him. Five years later, he reported that he had changed the material more and more wildly from rehearsal to rehearsal: "An exciting experiment!" But he added, "I brought the whole play to the forefront of current events, where it was bound to become incomprehensible. At the end, we bowed to an audience that believed it had seen a caricature of Hitler." Frisch drew conclusions from the misunderstandings and blocked the performance rights for this version; with the exception of the tenth scene, it was never printed.

In 1960, while reviewing his diary, Frisch once again came across the original prose sketch of the Öderland material, which "simply convinced" him when he read it. He revised the play once again and finally reported to Siegfried Unseld that he had removed "the direct political elements of the second version, as well as the private elements of the first version, both of which I consider buried in favour of the haunting atmosphere that was present in the first sketch." He had "the feeling that it was now a play that could be performed." The actor Ernst Schröder was interested in the role of the public prosecutor. The new version was premiered by Hans Lietzau on 25 September 1961 as part of the Berlin Festival at the Schillertheater, with stage design by Hansheinrich Palitzsch. The new version was first published in print in Spectaculum 4/1961. In 1963, Suhrkamp Verlag published a single edition. In 1975, Frisch included this adaptation as the final version in the edition of his complete works.

In the programme for the second version, Frisch compared his special relationship with the Öderland material to the feelings of a father who "loves children who appear to be misfits to those around them." In 1974, in an interview with Heinz Ludwig Arnold, he confessed which of his plays was "his favourite—not a successful play, but the most mysterious: Graf Öderland." After three versions, he said he would "not start a fourth, but for me it is the most vivid play." Frisch was too close to the play, too committed and caught up in his own invention and the opacity of the material that he "could not work as confidently" as he did in his later parables. Looking back, he was pleased with the character of Count Öderland, the "genuine invention of a character that did not exist before" and who was repeatedly perceived by the audience as a Nordic mythical figure: "It's nice that a character takes on this credibility in the realm of fables."

== Reception ==
=== Review of the premiere ===
The reviews of the premiere were almost universally negative, especially those from Switzerland. Sonja Rüegg saw the reason for this in the situation at the time in 1951, when many Swiss people felt existentially threatened by the Korean War and were seeking a clear political orientation between the major powers. In this situation, many reviewers reacted to the play's intended undermining of their own ideals and questioning of friend-foe categories with confusion, anger, and rejection, as well as a reaffirmation of their own worldview. The ambiguity of the play, combined with its negative tone, often led to misinterpretations. In many cases, the character of the public prosecutor was equated with the author, and this, in conjunction with pre-existing reservations about Frisch's political views, led to the construction of a supposed sympathy on the part of the author for communism.

Alfred Traber dismissed the play in Volksrecht as "superficial and untruthful," stating: "To rebel against every order in society, to proclaim the right of unrestricted individuality, as Count Öderland does, is madness." W. Bösch searched in vain in the Tages-Anzeiger for the author's intention, so that the audience could form a "clear pro and con." The Vaterland missed the hint "that even in the fulfilment of duty there can be a deep satisfaction." Elisabeth Brock-Sulzer contrasted Frisch with Brecht in Tat. While the latter fought for a class with his drama, Frisch fought "at most against a class, namely the one to which he will always belong," the bourgeoisie, to which belonging was "neither a disgrace nor a condemnation."

The St. Galler Tagblatt newspaper formulated its moral objections to the play: "The worldview that Frisch presents us with in this play must be strictly rejected. As the moral of the story, he proclaims that the axe is not a way out. But only the physically ill can live under the compulsive neurosis that a way out must be sought at all. For normal people, existence is not the languishing in chains depicted by Frisch, which imposes duties of loyalty and responsibility on us." The accusation of nihilism was raised by various social movements. The communist newspaper Vorwärts saw the play as a "not exactly significant manifesto of nihilism." The Catholic Neue Zürcher Nachrichten warned: "Nihilism is the creeping disease of our time." The Swiss family magazine Sie und Er expressed outrage: "Öderland unhesitatingly opens all doors to the winds of existentialist worldview." Erich Brock concluded in Mittag: "All that remains is infinitely powerless chatter, declamation of trite editorials a clumsy Nietzsche-Stirner morality."

There were also a few positive voices. Hans Bayer wrote in the Frankfurter Abendpost: "The play is gripping, captivating, depressing. Boldly conceived. Most of the audience was shocked. The poet was pale." In Switzerland, Albert J. Welti was one of the few positive critics. In the Neue Zürcher Zeitung, he highlighted the "symbolic power of the individual images and the polish of the dialogues" and praised the "exemplary performance" as a "witty construction." The following month, Werner Weber also took a critical stance on the book's publication in the NZZ, complaining: "This has nothing to do with human existence; it is the direct intrusion of instincts. Where has Frisch's mind and spirit gone that he presents community-building customs as deadly, when he himself experiences humanity in its purest form—for example, in that he not only has duties, but also certain rights, such as this: to imagine and take responsibility for a wasteland." Following a discussion round with Max Frisch, Hans Ott assessed the critical reception of the play: "[The] confrontation with our time, the reflection of our surroundings, of today's events, is what triggers the great unease among some of today's 'people of the times'." For Frisch, the play remained his "first failure on stage."

=== Recording of later versions ===
The 1956 revision was also partly misunderstood in terms of Frisch's intentions and interpreted as a parable of Hitler's seizure of power. Karl Korn titled his review "Öderland seizes power" and went on to say: "Thirty years ago, the play would have been a brilliant prophecy; twenty years ago, it would have cost the author his head if he had dared to take the manuscript across the German border—today, it is a swan song to the experiences of fascism." Joachim Kaiser saw Frisch and Kortner's reworking as "bringing to fruition what lay dormant in the material. But they also swept away the balladic fog that graciously covered the breaks and contradictions." The result, he said, was "an interesting impossibility, a dramaturgical miscarriage, a product of poetic weakness and stylistic indecision. All of this at a high level." In Frisch's ten-year effort to develop his material, one could observe "the hopeless struggle of a powerless artistic mind to achieve aesthetic mastery of the impossible."

The final version from 1961 also remained controversial. Gody Suter compared: "The difference between the original Öderland and the new version is like the difference between dusk and day, between promise and fulfilment, between talent and mastery. The lengthy reflection, the self-interpretation on the spot, has disappeared; what remains is the clear, suggestive legendary figure. The urge to emphasise the symbolic and profound has disappeared; what remains are the symbols and the deep meaning. Max Frisch relies on his characters; he can rely on himself." Friedrich Luft objected that in the tenth scene, Frisch "opposes the tragic hero with bogeymen, cabaret figures of power. In doing so, he damages his hero, he diminishes the final fun of the tragic grotesque." Johannes Jacobi, on the other hand, remained of the opinion that Graf Öderland was "beyond help, even in its third version. Max Frisch was unable to find a convincing conclusion, unable to round off his ballad into a drama. Now, at least half of his "Öderland" scenario has flesh and blood. The people live on stage, some of them can be considered exemplary types. Only the meaning, which should create a dramatic conclusion, remained hidden from the author even in the third version of 'Öderland'."

According to Max Frisch, Graf Öderland was better understood after the 1968 movement, as in a Paris performance in 1972: "These events have a lot to do with the play; it was a revolt, not a revolution, it was an eruption, and it bears a tremendous resemblance to the play." In 1997, Urs Bircher noted: "However, the play has not (yet) enjoyed convincing success in the theatre." Nevertheless, Graf Öderland was repeatedly staged in isolated cases and perceived in a changed context, including in student and school theatre performances. In 2010, Achim Lenz staged the play in a co-production between the Ringlokschuppen Mülheim and the Theatre Chur, drawing parallels with modern films such as Falling Down and Natural Born Killers. Between 2004 and 2006, Max E. Keller set a libretto by Anke Rauthmann and Yohanan Kaldi to music on behalf of the Komische Oper Berlin, creating a chamber opera entitled Die Axt (The Axe), which, however, was never performed. In November 2015, Volker Lösch adapted Frisch's drama with current references to the Pegida protests as Graf Öderland / Wir sind das Volk (We Are the People) for the Staatsschauspiel Dresden.

=== Reviews and position in the work ===
In later analyses of the drama, opinions remained divided. In his speech at the 1998 Max Frisch Prize award ceremony, Tankred Dorst named Graf Öderland as the play that had impressed him most, not because it was Frisch's best, but because it was "unsuccessful, still unfinished, an experiment, a fragment." Michael Butler expressed a similar view, saying that Graf Öderland had remained in his memory, "while the technically superior texts Biedermann and Andorra have long since been transformed into reading material for upper secondary school," which condemned Frisch to the "ineffectiveness of a classic"—a phrase that Frisch himself had coined for Brecht. For Alexander Stephan, Graf Öderland was "no longer just a pale contribution to the sociology of the bourgeoisie or a failed political spectacle about some real or imagined demagogue, but also and above all a well-packaged contribution to the possibilities and limitations of writing literature."

Despite its failure, Graf Öderland was widely regarded as an important step or turning point in Frisch's work. Jürgen H. Petersen, for example, saw in this play "the transition from a dramaturgy of transgressing spatial and temporal boundaries to a dramaturgy of the parabolic." For Hellmuth Karasek, Frisch had "achieved a scenic mastery, conciseness, and parabolic clarity that would remain characteristic of his dramas from then on. Graf Öderland is Frisch's first truly decisive step towards becoming a playwright of the modern world theatre." While Sonja Rüegg saw the play as the beginning of Frisch's "engagement as a citizen" and, above all, his critical examination of Switzerland, which was reflected in his subsequent prose works and essays, Gerhard P. Knapp regarded the stage work Graf Öderland as the "pivotal point" for a precisely opposite development: For Frisch, the failure of the play meant the end of the connection between private and social motives on stage. Already in his follow-up piece, Don Juan oder die Liebe zur Geometrie (Don Juan or the Love of Geometry), he confined himself to a private sphere. Die große Wut des Philipp Hotz (The Great Anger of Philipp Hotz) reduced the Öderland theme to a trivial joke, while in Biografie: Ein Spiel (Biography: A Game), the attempt to break out of one's own biography was motivated exclusively by private reasons, but ended in fatality, just like the socially motivated breakout in Graf Öderland. For Marianne Biedermann, Graf Öderland belonged in the context of the parable plays Biedermann und die Brandstifter (Biedermann and the Arsonists) and Andorra, which depict "the relationships between society and the individual and the fixation on role models and conventions" without offering any possible solutions in their observational criticism.

=== Film adaptation ===
In 1968, Rolf Hädrich filmed Graf Öderland for Hessischer Rundfunk. Bernhard Wicki played the leading role. Other roles were played by Ernst Jacobi as the murderer and Leonard Steckel, director of the premiere, as the clairvoyant. Der Spiegel announced that in the film adaptation, the count sleepwalks "melancholy and schizophrenic through the underground and the elegant world, not quite sure whether he is dreaming or awake. And the viewer doesn't know either." For Wolfram Schütte in the Frankfurter Rundschau, Hädrich attempted to "politically concretise" the drama. His production was "unfavourable in that it could not decide between television drama and film." Above all, the language of the play "stood in the way of a free production, becoming heavy and simplistic." Even with this further adaptation of Frisch's drama, it remained "the most abstruse of his dramatic productions."
