= Jean Ristat =

French poet and writer (1943–2023)

President of the Société des amis de Louis Aragon et Elsa Triolet
- In office 2010–2023
- Preceded by: Jean Ferrat

Personal details
- Born: 1 June 1943; Argent-sur-Sauldre, Cher, France
- Died: 2 December 2023 (aged 80); France
- Spouse: Franck Delorieux
- Occupation: Poet; Novelist

Jean Ristat (1 June 1943 – 2 December 2023) was a French poet and writer.

== Life and career ==
Jean Ristat founded the magazine collection Digraph in 1974, as suggested by his professor of philosophy, Jacques Derrida, which he then put to the recent essay on Plato's Pharmacy (see the supplement to the edition of 1974).

Ristat was until his death the director of French Letters, French literary supplement of the daily L'Humanité.

Ristat was also responsible for publishing the complete writings of Louis Aragon, for whom he was the literary executor.

Ristat died on 2 December 2023, aged 80.

== Awards ==
- 1971 Fénéon Prize, for Du coup d'État en littérature
- 2008 Mallarmé prize, for Artémis chasse à courre, le sanglier, le cerf et le loup

== Works ==
- The Writings of Nicolas Boileau and Jules Verne L'Herne, 1965. Reissued as The lost writings, Gallimard, 1974, with an afterword by Louis Aragon.
- Coups d'État in literature, followed by examples from the Bible and ancient authors, Gallimard, 1970.
- The entrance to the bay and taking the city of Rio de Janeiro in 1711, a tragi-comedy,followed by The unknown is not anything, dialogue with Roland Barthes, EFR, 1973.
- Who are the contemporary, Gallimard, 1975.
- Lord B, a novel in letters, with conversations, Gallimard, 1977.
- Ode to hasten the coming of Spring, Gallimard, 1978. Reissued in paperback "Poetry", Gallimard, 2008, with a short bio-bibliographic record and a long preface of Omar Berrada.
- The wig of the old Lenin,tragi-comedy, Gallimard, 1980.
- Digraph, 1974–1981, Flammarion, 1981.
- Tomb of Mr. Aragon, Gallimard, 1983. Reissued in paperback "Poetry", Gallimard, 2008, withOde.
- The Wreck of the Medusa, heroic comedy, Gallimard, 1986.
- The carnage to Pythagoras, occasional poem in four acts written to celebrate the founding of the French Republic, Gallimard, 1991.
- The love of parliament, praised Mr. Burattoni sitting on the tomb of Virgil and drawing, Gallimard, 1993.
- The place rider, novel, Gallimard, 1996.
- Aragon "First I read !", Gallimard, collection "Découvertes Gallimard" (nº 328), 1997.
- The death of the beloved tomb, Stock, 1998. Reissued in paperback "Poetry", Gallimard, 2008, withOde.
- Olivier Debre, the theater of painting ..., Fragments Editions, 2000.
- N Y Meccano, Gallimard, 2001.
- With Aragon. 1970–1982, interviews with Francis Crémieux, Gallimard, 2003.
- Aragon, the man with the glove, Le Temps des Cerises, 2005.
- The Journey to Jupiter and beyond, perhaps, Gallimard, 2006.
- Artemis, fox hunting, wild boar, deer and wolf, Gallimard, 2007.
- The Theater of the sky. A reading of Rimbaud, Gallimard, 2009.
