= Suréna =

Suréna is a tragedy by the French dramatist Pierre Corneille, first performed in 1674. It is the author's last play.

The plot is roughly based on the life of the Parthian general Surena or Suren who defeated the Romans at the Battle of Carrhae in 53 BC.
