= Jean Vauthier =

French playwright

- Born: 20 September 1910; Grâce-Hollogne (Belgium)
- Died: 5 May 1992 (aged 81); Paris
- Occupation: Playwright

Jean Vauthier (20 September 1910 – 5 May 1992) was a 20th-century French playwright.

== Biography ==
In 1981 he received the award for dramatic literature from the city of Paris.

The park where the Théâtre national de Bordeaux en Aquitaine is located is named after him. The main room of the theatre is called 'la salle Jean Vauthier'. The Théâtre du Rond-Point's (Paris 8e) small room has also been named after him since 1995.

He is buried in a cemetery in Gradignan (Gironde).

== Plays ==
- 1952: La Nouvelle Mandragore after Machiavelli, directed by Gérard Philipe, TNP Théâtre national de Chaillot
- 1955: Le Personnage combattant
- 1957: Les Prodiges
- 1960: Le Rêveur
- 1962: Badadesques
- 1970: Le Sang

== Distinctions ==
=== Prizes ===
- 1980: Prix Théâtre SACD de la Société des auteurs et compositeurs dramatiques
- 1981: Prix Delmas of the Académie Française
- 1981: Prix de la Ville de Paris (littérature dramatique)
- 1984 : Grand Prix du Théâtre de l’Académie Française
- 1987: Prix Georges-Lerminier du Syndicat de la critique
- 1990: Grand prix SACD of the Société des auteurs et compositeurs dramatiques

=== Honours ===
- 1981: Chevalier des Arts et Lettres
- 1982: Chevalier of the Légion d'honneur
- 1990: Commandeur des Arts et Lettres
- 1990: Médaille de la Ville de Bordeaux
- 1991: Officier de la Légion d'honneur
