= Pierre Halet =

French writer, poet and dramatist

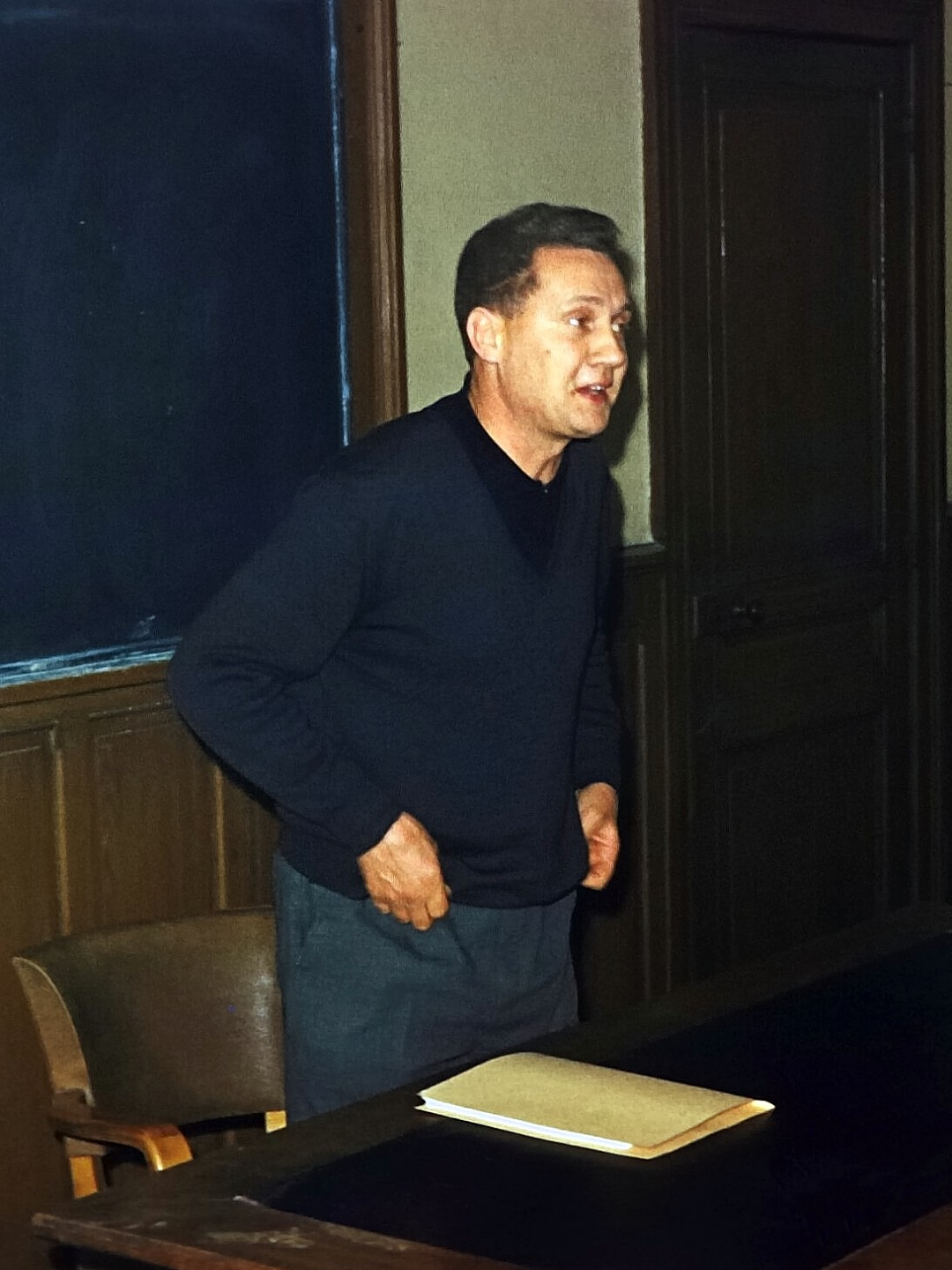
Pierre Halet, 1967, Faculté des Lettres, Bordeaux.

Pierre Halet (27 October 1924 – 27 January 1996) was a French writer, poet, and dramatist. His complete works have been published in five volumes by Les éditions La Simarre

His theater plays have often been performed. His play Little Boy, was used as a base for the piece. Computer suite for Little Boy by Jean-Claude Risset, first classical musical work fully synthesized by a computer.

== Works ==
Contes, éditions La Simarre 2013

== Theatre ==
- Le Cheval Caillou, created by the Comédie de Bourges en 1965 (Maison de la Culture de Bourges)
- La Provocation, created by the Comédie de Bourges
- La Butte de Satory Éditions du Seuil, Paris, 1967
- Little boy Éditions du Seuil, Paris, 1968
- La Double migration de Job Cardoso Éditions du Seuil, Paris, 1970
- See Brant, created in 1980 at the TJP in Strasbourg
- Au loin, le bruit de la mer Éditions Domens ISBN 2910457265

== Bibliography ==
- Balade en région Centre, sur les pas des écrivains (collectif) Éditions Alexandrines, 2012
