= Antigone (Brecht play) =

Adaptation of Antigone by Sophocles

Antigone, also known as The Antigone of Sophocles, is an adaptation by the German dramatist Bertolt Brecht of Hölderlin's translation of Sophocles' tragedy. It was first performed at the Chur Stadttheater in Switzerland in 1948, with Brecht's second wife Helene Weigel, in the lead role. This was Brecht's first directorial collaboration with Caspar Neher.

== Productions ==
A 1951 production of Antigone at the theatre in Greiz showed a new prologue written by Brecht in which Antigone, Tiresias, and Creon appear onstage and Tiresias gives an explication of the play. He instructs the audience to analyze the play and observe how humanity rose up against barbarism.

In 1967 The Living Theatre staged a production in English translated from Brecht's German by Judith Malina, who also directed it and played Antigone. The production, which had no sets or costumes, was performed over 200 times in its initial run.

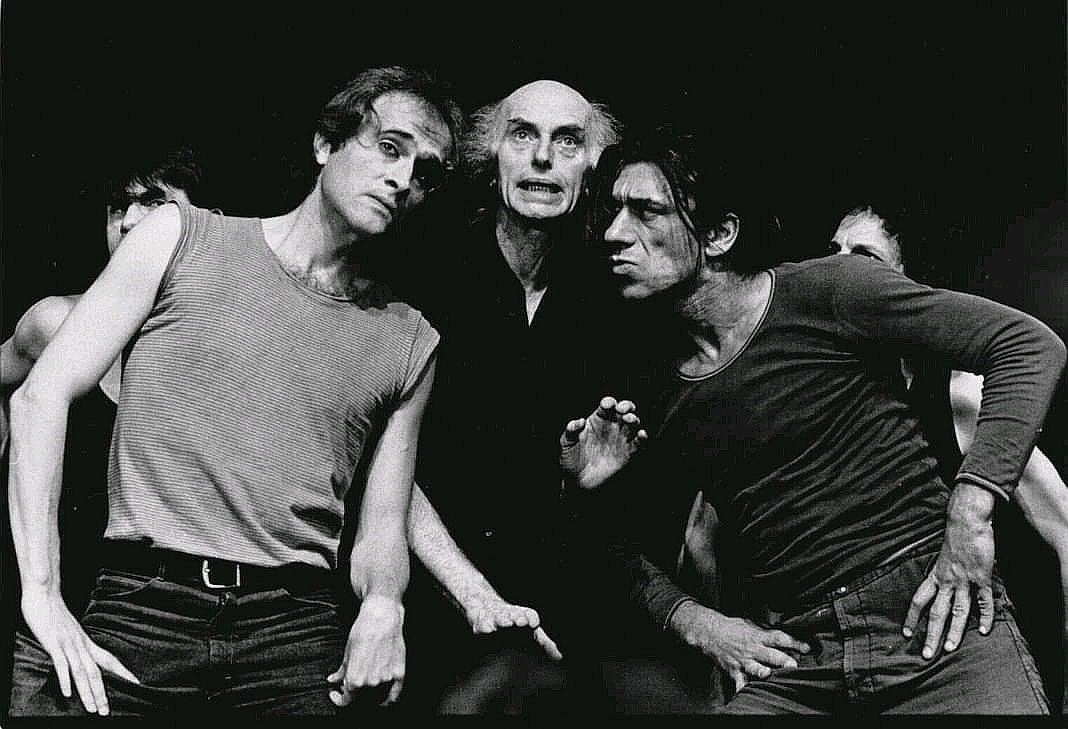
Julian Beck (center) in The Living Theatre's 1967 production

Ratan Thiyam directed a Meitei language-adaptation of the play in 1986.

== Differences from the original Antigone ==
The play begins with a modern World War II scene in which two sisters discover that their brother, a soldier, has returned from the front. They feed him but it turns out that he is a deserter and he is lynched from the lamppost. This first scene is intended to draw the parallel between the death of Polynices, that marks the first and dramatically key event in Sophocles' Antigone, with that of the deserting soldier in World War II.

Creon is played as a Nazi-style dictator, and the cast in most productions wear either modern or World War II German costume to make the parallel more obvious.

== Cultural influences ==
- Die Antigone des Sophokles nach der Hölderlinschen Übertragung für die Bühne bearbeitet von Brecht 1948 (1992), a film from Straub-Huillet.

== Sources ==
- Gabrielle H. Cody; Evert Sprinchorn (2007). The Columbia Encyclopedia of Modern Drama, Volume 2. Columbia University Press. ISBN 978-0-231-14424-7.
- Educational Theatre Journal, Vol. 24, No. 1 (Mar., 1972), pp. 47–68
- The Tulane Drama Review, Vol. 2, No. 1 (Nov., 1957), pp. 39–45
