= Maîtresse Françoise =

French writer and dominatrix

- Occupations: Dominatrix, author
- Website: Official site

Françoise Maîtresse
- Author: Annick Foucalt
- Language: French
- Subject: Female dominance
- Publisher: Éditions Gallimard
- Publication date: 1994
- Pages: 187
- ISBN: 2-07-073834-5
- OCLC: 34986025
- LC Class: PQ2666.O823 F73 1994

Maîtresse Françoise (pen name Annick Foucault) is a publicly known dominatrix in Paris, France. Her autobiography was published in France by publisher Éditions Gallimard.

== Biography ==
=== Minitel ===
Annick Foucault was born in the South of France. Her childhood was marred by the loss of her father. After having been the victim of an accident, she consecutively had no real other alternative but dropping out of university. Thus she chiefly became a self-taught woman. She first ran a ready-to-wear shop and then became interested in Minitel, which she considered to be "an excellent means of communication, a kind of no-man's-land where anything is allowed". She subsequently participated in various forums and set up a "debate forum", 3615 Fetish, which was devoted to sadomasochism, before launching in 1994 her own specialized "minitel network", under the name of Miss M. Marc Daum described her as "a major messaging authorizing officer 3615 on behalf of a foremost player in telematics, given that the good intellectual performance of her forums [had built] the loyalty of her knowledgeable readers". During the same period, she was the chief editor of a magazine—La Scène—with a circulation of 5,000 copies. In October 1996, she provided a "precious collaboration" to the journalist Monique Ayoun by the time she was writing an article dedicated to Minitel on behalf of the newspaper Biba.

=== Writer ===
In 1994, Annick Foucault—who already enjoyed a strong reputation in specialized circles—published a writing under her real name: Françoise Maîtresse. This book—which, as pointed out by Anne-Élisabeth Moutet, was edited by Gallimard— is an autobiographical narrative which content, according to Jean Pache, appears to be "strange and meaningful". The common thread unfolds over "her history, her childhood, the discovery of her cerebral sexuality, her experience as a dominatrix, in a style as precise as lively and literary". The script is prefaced by Pierre Bourgeade, who considered the literary quintessentiality of this essay as part of the expression of an "unconscious freedom of its own", while Jean-Jacques Pauvert displayed it as a "major work of erotic literature over the past ten years". In this autobiography, the author presented herself in two ways: Françoise, the dominatrix, and Marianne, "who discovered her masochism by watching the whip scenes in pirate movies as a teenager". Anne Larue emphasized on the link which appeared to prevail between those two paradoxical idiosyncrasies: "Françoise, it is first of all the name of a little girl of twelve years old [...] who plays the mistress".

The book introduced sadomasochism into mainstream literature, "without censorship, but also without complacency towards the reader", by focusing on the "breaks" that lead to it, from an angle that, according to Annick Foucault, gains the consent from partners. Annick Foucault suggested that they be recognized as being endowed with "some weakness" and, further on, she commented the aforesaid point as follows:

Should this weakness be dramatized or simulated, what would be the concern? They come out strengthened while trading their cumbersome chains for a three-piece suit, then they return home feeling both soothed and comforted.

She pleads for the abandonment of some biases:

By eroticizing barbarism, fetishists and sadomasochists castrate the true executioners through their own weapons.

Her intellection echoes the philosophical thought of Gilles Deleuze, to whom she pays tribute, in a way that, according to Charles J. Stivale, conveys a "perceptive and fascinating reflection on La Vénus à la fourrure, Présentation de Sacher-Masoch de Deleuze". According to Céline du Chéné, Mistress Françoise turns out to be "probably the most intellectual of the dominatrixes of the Parisian scene", owning "all the editions" of Leopold von Sacher-Masoch and "having maintained a correspondence" with Gilles Deleuze, who, as per Jean Pache, would have sealed "this unexpected disciple friendship and consideration".

After the publication of her story, which, as duly noted by Giovanni Firmian, was "a great success in France", she was invited to various French talk shows and gave interviews about sadomasochism.

On the occasion of the release of a translation of her book in Italy, Giovanni Firmian described her author as "the queen of dominatrixes and sadomasochistic practices, the most famous one in France, but also known throughout the rest of Europe and United States". However, the Italian periodical La Stampa reveals significantly more critical comments recorded by the journalist Mirella Serri, who believes that the author of Maîtresse Françoise considers herself to be the embodiment of "an outstanding artist belonging to a scarce and special breed: i.e. the "mystics" of sex".

== Published works ==
=== Autobiographical account ===
- Foucault, Annick (1994). "Pierre Bourgeade". Françoise maîtresse: récit. Digraphe. Vol. 39. Paris: Mercure de France.ISBN 2070738345, 9782070738342 OCLC 463806292, éditions Gallimard OCLC 34986025 BnF 356972215 réimpr. 2000 c/o La Musardine, 216 p., in coll. "Lectures amoureuses de Jean-Jacques Pauvert" ISSN 1275-1065 sous le titre Françoise maîtresse ISBN 2842711416, 9782842711412 OCLC 468164817 BnF 37113241k.
  - This book was reissued in 2016—under the title Françoise Maîtresse 2—with two hundred unpublished pages accompanied by a preface by Jean Streff and an afterword by Philippe Guénin BnF FRBNF45051874.

==== Foreign translation ====
- Foucault, Annick (1996). El ama: memorias de una dominadora [Françoise maîtresse]. La Sonrisa verticale (in Spanish). Translated by Joaquín Jordá. Barcelone: éd. Tusquets. ISBN 8472237877. OCLC 40313236. Reprint in 1998, 235 p. c/o ed. "Círculo de Lectores" in coll. La sonrisa vertical, ISBN 8422669587, 9788422669586, OCLC 807066560. 2nd edition in 2008, c/o Tusquets Editores, 222 p. ISBN 9788472237872, 8472237877 OCLC 433948796
  - Barcelone : (in Spanish) Tusquets, 1996, 224 p. "La Sonrisa vertical"; Number 99. ISBN 84-7223-787-7.
  - Barcelone : (in Spanish) Círculo de Lectoras, 1998, 235 p. "La sonrisa vertical".
- Foucault, Annick (1995). Françoise Maîtresse la dominatrice (in Italian). Translated by Delia Coletti. First edition in 1995 under the following title: La dominatrice : Françoise maîtresse. Milan: éd. Sonzogno. ISBN 8845407500. OCLC 797741703.

=== Digraphe ===
- "Élodie en sous-sol". Digraphe. No. 65. September 1993.
- "Magnum le Chien". Digraphe. Qui est là ? (66). Gallimard. December 1993.
- "Les femmes pornocrates". Digraphe (70). September 1994.
- "Laissez-nous". Digraphe (79). Winter 1997.

=== Miscellaneous ===
==== Marquis Magazine ====
- « Laissez-nous ». "Leave us", Marquis Magazine, Number 19 English and French version.
- « Pleine lune ». "full moon", Marquis Magazine, Number 21, English and French version.
- « Pleine lune », Marquis Magazine, Number 21, photos Christophe Mourthé.
- « Interview JG-Leather », Marquis Magazine, Number 23, photos Christophe Mourthé.
- « Dominatrix Park - Les dernières amazones », Marquis Magazine, Number 31, photos Christophe Mourthé.

==== Newlook ====
- « Tu montes Maître ou je te monte ? », Newlook, September 1994.
- « Agathe, tu ne jouiras point ! », Newlook, July 1994.

==== Penthouse ====
- « Ciré noir », Penthouse, 1995.

==== Others ====
- Préface à Retour à Roissy de Pauline Réage, dessins de Loïc Dubigeon, éditions Astarté, 1995. 48 p.
- « Mon premier esclave », De l'infini au zéro. Anthologie historique des lectures érotiques de Jean-Jacques Pauvert, Stock, 2001.
- « Petit cul », Mes lectures érotiques. Morceaux choisis de Jean-Jacques Pauvert, La Musardine, 2015.
- "In praise of Sacher Masoch". Skin Two (37). London: T. Woodward Pub.: 24–25. OCLC 723949821, 37473359

== Perform ==
=== Drama ===
- Les Bruits d'Avila, Sorbonne, texte de Philippe Guénin, mise en scène par Monique Kissel.
- Transfiguration, auteur : Philippe Guénin, le Théâtre Poème, Bruxelles, 1995, le Théâtre du Lavoir moderne, Paris, 1995.

=== Radio interviews ===
- François Angelier (17 November 2013). "L'amour – fouet ou le monde masochien : Cécile Guilbert, Alain Robbe-Grillet, Harry Kumel". Mauvais genres. France Culture. Maîtresse Françoise est interviewée par Céline du Chéné. Émission préparée par Claire Martin du Gard et Pascale Dassibat. Réalisation de Laurent Paulré avec la collaboration de Jean-Baptiste Thoret, Philippe Rouyer, Céline du Chéné et Christophe Bier.
- François Angelier (19 October 2013). "Week end Mauvais-genres : Les femmes fatales (rencontre avec Hélène Fillières), lauréats du prix Mauvais Genres 2013". Mauvais genres. France Culture. Entretiens avec Arielle Dombasle, André Engel, Maîtresse Françoise, La Bourette, Dominique Kalifa — avec la collaboration de JB Thoret, P. Rouyer, Céline du Chéné, Antoine Guillot, Jean Pierre Dionnet, Joseph Gohsn. Intervenants : Hélène Fillières & Alexandre Mathis.

=== Collaborations ===
- 1989 — TF1, Ciel mon mardi : Christophe Dechavanne, spécial SM.
- 1989 — La Cinq, Histoires vraies : Béatrice Schönberg.
- 1990 — TF1, Ciel mon mardi : Christophe Dechavanne, spécial fétichisme.
- 1990 — La Cinq, Ça vous regarde : André Bercoff et Jean Pierre Barbe.
- May 1993 — France 3, Français, si vous parliez : André Bercoff.
- June 1993 — A2, Durant la nuit : Guillaume Durand.
- Fébruary 1998 — TF1, Sans aucun doute : Julien Courbet.
- 2000 — Canal+, Nulle part ailleurs : Philippe Gildas à l'occasion de la sortie du film de Benoit Jacquot : Sade.
- 2001 — TF1, Ciel mon mardi : Christophe Dechavanne, spécial SM

== Critical bibliography ==
- Anthony, Catherine (1998). L'amour aujourd'hui. Documents (in French). Paris: Le Cherche midi. ISBN 978-2-862-74572-5. OCLC 470195500..
- Philippe Cousin; et al. (2000). "Marc Daum". L'Encyclopédie du sadomasochisme. 407 p., ouvrage collectif publié sous la direction de Philippe Cousin. La Musardine. p. 176. ISBN 2842710886. OCLC 965207817. "Annick Foucault apparait pour la première fois en public et en direct dans l'émission de Christophe Dechavanne — Ciel mon mardi — en 1989. Suivront d'innombrables reportages alimentés par la parution d'une autobiographie Françoise Maîtresse."BnF FRBNF37215202
- Pauvert, Jean-Jacques (2001). "Françoise Maîtresse / Annick Foucault". Anthologie historique des lectures érotiques, 1985-2000, de l'infini au zéro (alternative title: "De l'infini au zéro") (in French). Il s'agit du 5e et dernier volume de cette anthologie. Stock. ISBN 223405379X. OCLC 47743578. BnF 37583246f.
- Anne Larue (2002). "1. La piste des châteaux. Masochisme et roman gothique — 7. La littérature enfantine et la résistance masochiste". Le masochisme ou comment ne pas devenir un suicidé de la société (pdf). Libre choix (in French). Vol. 18. Éditions Talus d'approche. pp. 22, 90, 129–133. ISBN 2872460918.OCLC 491577674, 1010208339.
- Le Brun, Annie (2004) [Stock 2000]. Du trop de réalité. Folio essais (in French). Gallimard. ISBN 2070314952..
- Gala Fur; Véronique Bergen (2016). "Françoise Maîtresse". Dictionnaire du BDSM (in French). Paris: La Musardine. ISBN 978-2-842-71825-1. OCLC 981936820.Maîtresse Françoise at Google Books BnF FRBNF45192122.
- Pierre Cormary, L'enfant qui criait au loup, Carnets de la philosophie N°7 - Le plaisir et rien d'autre
