= My Little Princess =

- French poster
- Directed by: Eva Ionesco
- Written by: Eva Ionesco; Marc Cholodenko; Philippe Le Guay
- Produced by: François-Xavier Frantz
- Starring: Isabelle Huppert
- Cinematography: Jeanne Lapoirie
- Edited by: Laurence Briaud
- Music by: Bertrand Burgalat
- Production companies: Les Productions Bagheera; Canal + France 2
- Distributed by: Sophie Dulac Distribution
- Release dates: 17 May 2011 (Cannes); 29 June 2011
- Running time: 105 minutes
- Countries: France; Romania
- Languages: French; English; Romanian
- Budget: $3.4 million
- Box office: $136.555

My Little Princess is a 2011 drama film directed by Eva Ionesco and inspired by her relationship with her mother, the well-known artistic photographer Irina Ionesco whose pictures of her young daughter caused controversy when they were published in the 1970s.

== Plot ==
12-year-old Violetta is raised by her loving grandmother ("Mamie", the French equivalent of "Grandma") in 1970s Paris. Her volatile mother, Hanna has abandoned the family to pursue a career in photography and visits infrequently. During one of these visits, she invites Violetta to her apartment and asks her to model for her photographs, finding her to be a natural talent at modeling. She begins to dress Violetta in gaudy dresses and introduces her to Hanna's lover, painter Ernst, who finances her career. She starts exploiting her daughter who by transforming into a kind of Lolita becomes increasingly alienated from other children of her age. At school she is eventually frequently insulted and rejected. Then Mamie dies and Hanna's photographs are about to unequivocally overstep the line of acceptability. Hanna even coerces Violetta mercilessly into cooperation by withholding her food in case she doesn't agree to pose for increasingly daring photographs. Eventually Hanna's right of custody for her twelve-year-old daughter is at stake.

== Cast ==
- Isabelle Huppert as Hanna Giurgiu
- Anamaria Vartolomei as Violetta Giurgiu
- Denis Lavant as Ernst
- Louis-Do de Lencquesaing as Antoine Dupuis
- Georgetta Leahu as Mamie
- Jethro Cave as Updike
- Pascal Bongard as Jean
- Anne Benoît as Madame Chenus
- Johanna Degris-Agogue as Apolline
- Déborah Révy as Nadia
- Lou Lesage as Rose
- Nicolas Maury as Louis
- Pauline Jacquart as Fifi

== Reception ==
German magazine Focus found Anamaria Vartolomei was convincing as a young girl whose life eventually turns into a nightmare because of her mother's artistic ambitions in 1970s Paris.

Painful personal experience is distilled into poignant drama in Eva Ionesco’s promising first feature My Little Princess. Autobiographical events from the 1970s are shaped into a fairytale-like narrative illuminating the abusive nature of Ionesco’s relationship with her mother Irina and eternal arguments over the limits of artistic freedom.

— Allan Hunter – Screen Daily

Critics also commented that Anamaria Vartolomei and Isabelle Huppert have portrayed the lack of affection so convincingly that they have even been accused of interacting insufficiently as actors.
