= Gassel (surname) =

Gassel is a surname. Notable people with the surname include:

- Lucas Gassel (c. 1490–1568), Flemish Renaissance painter
- Nathalie Gassel (born 1964), Belgian writer and photographer
- Stijn van Gassel (born 1996), Dutch footballer
