= Bourboulon =

Bourboulon is a surname. Notable people with the surname include:

- Jacques Bourboulon (born 1946), French photographer
- Martin Bourboulon (born 1979), French film director
