= Eva Ionesco =

French actress and director

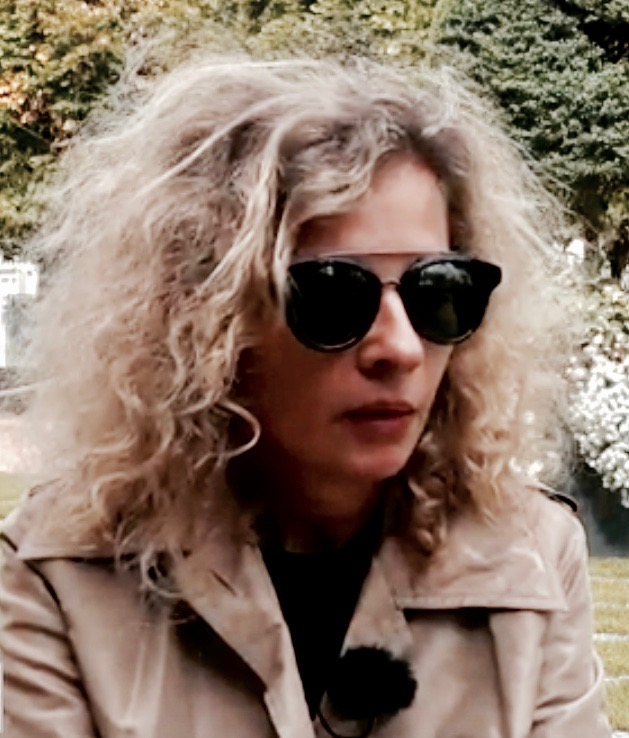
- Ionesco in 2017
- Born: 18 July 1965 (age 61); Paris, France
- Occupations: Actress; film director; screenwriter
- Years active: 1976–present
- Spouse: Simon Liberati (m. 2013)
- Children: 1
- Mother: Irina Ionesco

Eva Ionesco (born 18 July 1965) is a French actress and filmmaker. She is the daughter of photographer Irina Ionesco and came to international prominence as a child model after her mother abused her by showing her in her works.

== Early life ==
Ionesco was born to photographer Irina Ionesco, a Frenchwoman of Romanian descent, who had a relationship with a Hungarian man who worked in the military. Prior to Ionesco's birth, her mother had worked as a contortionist as she had come from a family of circus performers on her maternal side. Her parents separated when she was 3 at which point Ionesco became estranged from her father.

In 1977 her mother lost custody of her and Ionesco lived for a time with the parents of footwear designer Christian Louboutin who had already left home.

From the age of 13 Ionesco became a regular club-goer at Le Palace along with Christian Louboutin and Edwige Belmore and also developed a drug habit. She was in and out of various foster homes until an older boyfriend of hers took custody of her at the age of 16.

== Career ==
At the age of 5, Eva became her mother's favorite photo model. Irina Ionesco's erotic photographs of her young daughter Eva have been a source of controversy since they first appeared in the 1970s. Eva also modeled for other photographers such as Jacques Bourboulon.

She is the youngest model ever to appear in a Playboy nude pictorial, since she was featured at age 11 in the October 1976 issue of the Italian edition of the magazine in a set by Bourboulon. In the published pictures, she posed nude at a beach and around Bourboulon's villa in provocative, eroticized poses, ranging from topless portraits to more explicit images featuring open-legged poses. In 1981, Bourboulon published Eva, a portfolio which contained Eva's photos from the Playboy shoot as well as a few photos of other models, presented as loose sheets, printed on high quality photographic paper. The portfolio is still occasionally offered for sale by high-end auction houses.

Another of her nude pictorials, in the November 1978 issue of the Spanish edition of Penthouse, was a selection of her mother's photographs. She also appeared on the cover page of Der Spiegel at the age of 12 completely nude. The issue was later expunged from the magazine's records. Many other magazines, such as IL FOTOGRAFO and Siesta, have published and republished some of Jacques Bourboulon's and Irina Ionesco's photographs.

She made her film début at the age of 11 in 1976, playing a child in Roman Polanski's film The Tenant. A short time later she was cast in films of the mid-1970s such as Maladolescenza (also known as Puppy Love). The film became controversial for starring her and another 12 year old actress in scenes involving both full frontal and rear nudity, and simulated sexual activity, including oral sex and sexual intercourse.

In the 1980s, Ionesco attended the prestigious acting school Amandiers, directed by Patrice Chéreau and Pierre Romans.

Eva claimed her story served as inspiration for Louis Malle's film Pretty Baby.

=== Directorial career ===
Ionesco began directing in 2006.

In 2011 she directed her first full-length feature film, My Little Princess, which debuted at the 2011 Cannes Film Festival. The film, loosely inspired by Ionesco's personal life, starred Isabelle Huppert as a predatory photographer who uses her young daughter as a model in a series of nude photos.

Ionesco again paired with Isabelle Huppert for her next film, Golden Youth, about a young couple in Paris who begin to spend time with a much older and wealthier couple.

=== Writing career ===
In 2015 Ionesco's husband Simon Liberati released a book about their courtship and her childhood called Eva.

In 2017 Ionesco released her first book, Innocence, which dealt with her fractured relationship with her father.

== Legal disputes ==
Eva Ionesco protested the images taken by her mother Irina since her childhood. In 1998 the French police confiscated from her mother's apartment hundreds of photographs in which she appears at the age of five in suggestive poses and in complete nudity. In 2012 Eva sued her mother for taking pornographic photos of her as a child. Although much of her claim was denied, she did receive some compensation. She later filed an appeal, and the Paris court of appeal restricted the exhibition, sell and circulation of photographs breaching her right to privacy. She was also awarded 70,000 in damages. In 2026, she brought a suit against her mother's estate, which she accuses to continue selling pictures despite the earlier court decisions.

== Personal life ==
Ionesco has a son, Lukas Ionesco, born in 1995.

Since 2013, she has been married to writer and journalist Simon Liberati.

== Filmography ==
=== As actress ===
- Twice Upon a Time (2019, directed by Guillaume Nicloux) – Annie Arron
- Les déferlantes (2013, directed by Éléonore Faucher) – Lili
- Crime (2010, directed by Vincent Ostria) – Ella
- La famille Wolberg (2009, directed by Axelle Ropert) – Sarah, Joseph's Friend
- A l'est de moi (2008, directed by Bojena Horackova)
- J'ai rêvé sous l'eau (2008, directed by Hormoz) – Femme Sif
- Je vous hais petites filles (2008, directed by Yann Gonzalez) – Punk Idol
- Comédie sentimentale (2008, directed by Emily Barnett) – Marylin
- La promenade (2007, directed by Marina De Van) – The Prostitute #1
- La petite fille sous l'océan (2006, directed by Nathalie Giraud) – Anaïs
- Les invisibles (2005, directed by Thierry Jousse) – Vanessa
- Écoute le temps (2005, directed by Alanté Alfandari) – Mme Bourmel
- Quand je serai star (2004, directed by Patrick Mimouni) – Alice
- Qui perd gagne! (2003, directed by Laurent Benegui) – The Deauville Gambler
- L’empreinte (2003, directed by David Mathieu-Mahias) – Anna Yordanoff
- That Woman (2003, directed by Guillaume Nicloux) – Mme Kopmans
- Un homme, un vrai (2003, directed by Arnaud & Jean-Marie Larrieu) – The Producer
- Je suis votre homme aka Eros thérapie (2003, directed by Danièle Dubroux) – Hélène
- Il est plus facile pour un chameau... (2002, directed by Valeria Bruni Tedeschi) – A Woman at Cinema
- Les diable (2002, directed by Christophe Ruggia)
- Un aller simple (2001, directed by Laurent Heynemann) – Clémentine
- Paris mon petit corps est bien las de ce grand monde (2000, directed by Francoise Prenant) – Agathe's Friend
- L'Oncle Paul (2000, directed by Gérard Vergez) – Colombe
- Adieu, plancher des vaches! (1999, directed by Otar Iosseliani) – A Prostitute
- La patinoire (1999, directed by Jean-Philippe Toussaint) – The Editor
- Maison de famille (1999, (TV) directed by Serge Moati) – Sandra
- La nouvelle Eve (1998, directed by Catherine Corsini) – A Woman of the PS
- Rien que des grandes personnes (1997, directed by Jean-Marc Brondolo)
- Vive la république! (1997, directed by Éric Rochant) – Victor's Woman
- La petite maman (1997, directed by Patrice Martineau) – The Swimming Teacher
- Liberté chérie (1996, directed by Jean-Luc Gaget)
- Romaine (1996, directed by Agnès Obadia) – Pastelle
- L'appartement (1996, directed by Gilles Mimouni) – A Woman at Travel Agency
- Encore (1996, directed by Pascal Bonitzer) – Olga
- Romaine et les filles (1995, directed by Agnès Obadia)
- Pullman paradis (1995, directed by Michèle Rosier) – Marie-Paule Daragnès
- Maigret: Cécile est morte (1994, (TV) directed by Denys de la Patellière) – Florence Boynet
- Bête de scène (1994, directed by Bernard Nissile) – One of the Daughters
- X pour Xana (1994, directed by Dominic Gould)
- Montparnasse-Pondichéry (1993, directed by Yves Robert) – Colette
- Rupture(s) (1993, directed by Christine Citti) – Anna
- Grand bonheur (1993, directed by Hervé Le Roux) – Emma
- Comment font les gens? (1992, directed by Pascale Bailly) – Emmanuelle
- La sévillane (1992, directed by Jean-Philippe Toussaint) – Pascale's Friend
- La table d'émeraude (1992, directed by Pierre Bourgeade)
- Chant de guerre parisien (1991, directed by Laetitia Masson)
- Monsieur (1990, directed by Jean-Philippe Toussaint) – Mme Ponz-Romanov
- L'Orchestre rouge (1989, directed by Jacques Rouffio) – Margaret
- Marie cherchait l'amour (1989, directed by Sylvie Matton)
- Résidence surveillée (1987, directed by Frédéric Compain)
- L'amoureuse (1987, directed by Jacques Doillon) – Elsa
- Hôtel de France (1986, directed by Patrice Chéreau) – Katia, the Waitress
- Jeux d'artifices (1986, directed by Virginie Thévenet) – Eva
- Grenouilles (1985, directed by Adolfo Arrieta) – Kati
- Les Nanas (1984, directed by Annick Lanoë) – Miss France
- La Nuit porte-jarretelles (1984, directed by Virginie Thévenet)
- Meurtres à domicile (1981, directed by Marc Lobet) – Pauline
- L'amant de poche (1978, directed by Bernard Queysanne) – Martine
- Maladolescenza (1977, directed by Pier Giuseppe Murgia) – Silvia
- Le locataire (1976, directed by Roman Polanski) – Bettina, Madam Gaderian's daughter
- Spermula (1976, directed by Charles Matton)

=== As director ===
- La loi de la forêt (2006)
- My Little Princess (2010)
- Golden Youth (2019)

== Theatrical work ==
- La voix humaine by Jean Cocteau (directed by M. Mastor)
- Lola et toi et moi (directed by N. Schmidt)
- Penthésilée & La petite Catherine Heilbronn (1987) by Heinrich von Kleist (either directed by Pierre Romans)
- Platonov (1987) by Anton Chekhov (directed by Patrice Chéreau) – Zézette
- Le retour au désert (1988) by Bernard-Marie Koltès (directed by Patrice Chéreau)
- Le conte d'hiver (1988) by William Shakespeare (directed by Luc Bondy) – Mopsa
- Chroniques d'une fin d'après-midi (1988) by Anton Chekov (directed by Pierre Romans)
- Ecrit sur l'eau (1991) by Eric Emmanuel Schmitt (directed by Niels Arestrup)
- Le sang des fraises (1992) by Catherine Bidaut (directed by Daniel Pouthier)
