= Denise Colomb =

French photographer (1902–2004)

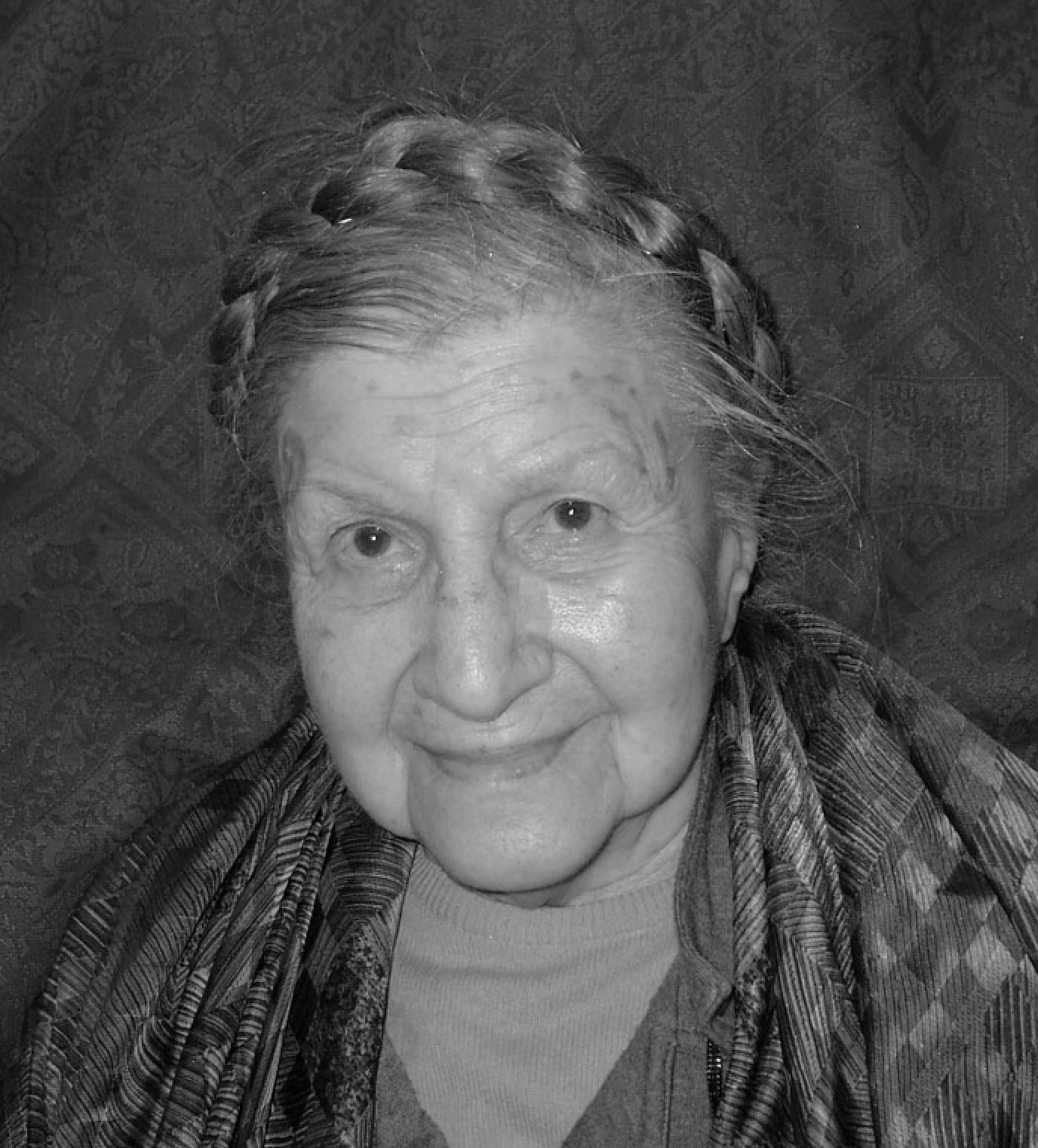
- Born: 1 April 1902; Paris, France
- Died: 1 January 2004 (aged 101)
- Occupation: Photographer
- Years active: 1935 – 2004
- Relatives: Pierre Loeb (brother); Caroline Loeb (great-niece); Martin Loeb (actor) (great-nephew); Isabelle Weingarten (great-niece)

Denise Colomb (1 April 1902 – 1 January 2004) was a French photographer celebrated for her humanist portraits of mid-20th-century artists and for reportage produced on five continents. Over a seven-decade career she created an archive of more than 50,000 negatives, now held by the French state. In 1981, she was named a Knight of the Order of Arts and Letters.

== Early life and first photographs ==
Born Denise Lœb to a musical Jewish family in Paris, Colomb studied piano before marrying maritime engineer Gilbert Cahen in 1926. Posted with him to French Indochina, she bought her first Leica camera during the voyage east; between 1935 and 1937 she travelled from Saigon to Cambodia and China, photographing everyday street life and monumental landscapes.

== Post-war career ==
The Second World War interrupted Colomb's practice; while living in Dieulefit during the war, she and her husband adopted the name “Colomb” to survive the Holocaust. She kept "Colomb" as her professional name after the war.

Colomb's breakthrough came in 1947 when she photographed playwright Antonin Artaud. Through her brother, gallerist Pierre Loeb, she gained access to leading painters and sculptors and went on to produce intimate, in-studio portraits of Giacometti, Picasso, Miró, Nicolas de Staël, and others.

Between assignments for Regards, Le Photographe, and Réalités, Colomb completed long-form reportages: the island of Sein (1950), Paris coachmen (1954) and the food market of Les Halles (1954). Invited by Aimé Césaire, she undertook two voyages to Martinique and Guadeloupe (1948, 1958), producing ethnographic series later shown at the Musée de l’Homme.

== Exhibitions and publications ==
Colomb's first solo show of artist portraits opened at Galerie Pierre in 1957; a major retrospective followed at the Musée des Arts Décoratifs in 1969. Subsequent surveys were mounted at the Pavillon des Arts (1990) and the Centre national de la photographie (1997). Colomb's work has been reproduced in monographs such as Christian Caujolle's Photo Poche volume (1997) and in numerous catalogues raisonné.

== Style and technique ==
Colomb's photographs are rooted in the post-war humanist aesthetic and the French current of poetic realism, balancing precise formal composition with an empathetic regard for her sitters. She began working with a 24 × 36 mm Leica during her 1935-37 voyage to Indochina and, from 1947, frequently combined it with a twin-lens Rolleiflex.

For commissioned studio portraits she preferred the Rolleiflex because the 6 × 6 cm negative delivered finer detail and allowed flexible cropping in either direction. Colomb almost always relied on natural light and produced few colour photographs. In the darkroom, Colomb embraced aggressive recropping and experimental processes such as solarisation, exemplified by her circa-1950 print "Petit nu (Solarisation)."

== Legacy ==
On 18 November 1991 Colomb donated her entire œuvre—over 50,000 negatives, their contact sheets and about 2,000 signed prints—to the French state, where it is conserved by the Médiathèque du Patrimoine et de la Photographie (MAP) in Charenton-le-Pont. The state holding was augmented in 2001 by 1,500 additional prints, several hundred colour slides and 2,300 negatives made after the initial bequest. Works from this archive formed the core of the Jeu de Paume exhibition Denise Colomb and the West Indies, 1948-1958 (2009), demonstrating its continuing curatorial importance.

Historians of humanist photography now cite Colomb alongside Robert Doisneau, Édouard Boubat, Izis and Willy Ronis as a canonical figure of the movement.

== Personal life ==
In 1926, Colomb married maritime engineer Gilbert Cahen; their three children were Pascaline (1928), Olivier (1929), and Bertrand (1931). Composer Roland Cahen is her grandson, actresses Caroline Loeb Isabelle Weingarten are her great-nieces, and Martin Loeb was her grandnephew. She died at her Paris home on 1 January 2004, aged 101, having remained active and attending exhibition openings until shortly before her death.
