= Christophe Moulin =

Christophe Moulin may refer to:

- Christophe Moulin (television presenter) (born 1967), French television presenter
- Christophe Moulin (footballer, born 1958), Swiss footballer and manager
- Christophe Moulin (footballer, born 1971), Swiss footballer and manager
