= Galatea Bellugi =

French actress (born 1997)

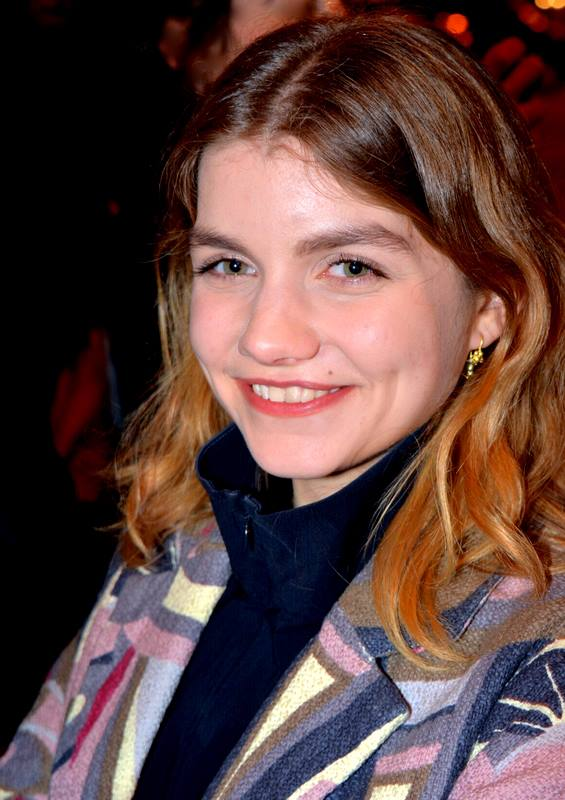
- Bellugi in 2017
- Born: 1997 (age 28–29); Paris, France
- Occupation: Actress
- Relatives: Alba Gaïa Bellugi (sister)

Galatea Bellugi (Note: Also spelled Galatéa Bellugi) (born 1997) is a French actress.

== Early life ==
Born in Paris, Bellugi is the daughter of Italian actor Duccio Bellugi-Vannuccini, while her mother is a Danish costume designer. Her sister Alba Gaïa Bellugi is also an actress, known for her role as Élise in the film The Intouchables (2011). She has family in Rome and Tuscany.

After studying contemporary and classical dance, synchronized swimming, and playing saxophone, she left to study cinema at the Université de Montréal from 2015 to 2016. She left to pursue a degree in international relations at Roskilde University from 2016 to 2019, in between which she filmed The Invisible Boy: Second Generation (2018), The Apparition (2018) and Golden Youth (2019).

== Career ==
She began her career at the age of 6 in Ariane Mnouchkine's Le Dernier Caravansérail at the Théâtre du Soleil, where her father worked and still works as an actor. She made her screen debut at the age of 7 in Les Yeux clairs (Pale Eyes), directed by Jérôme Bonnell.

In 2015, she played a pregnant teen named Mélanie in Keeper by Guillaume Senez, a role for which she was selected for Révélations, the shortlist for Most Promising Actress at the César Awards, and for which she received the Best Actress award at the Marrakech International Film Festival.

In 2018, she starred opposite Vincent Lindon in Xavier Giannoli's The Apparition, in which she plays a young girl named Anna who develops a cult following after claiming to have seen an apparition of the Virgin Mary in a remote village in southern France, and is investigated by a journalist played by Lindon who is tasked by the Vatican to determine her authenticity. Her performance earned her a nomination for Most Promising Actress at the 44th César Awards. That same year, she made her Italian debut in the fantasy superhero film The Invisible Boy: Second Generation by Gabriele Salvatores.

In 2019, she starred in Eva Ionesco's Golden Youth as a young teenager who is drawn into a lavish nightlife by a wealthy older couple, portrayed by Isabelle Huppert and Melvil Poupaud.

In 2021, she appeared alongside Mathieu Amalric in the musical comedy Tralala, for which she wrote her own lyrics. In 2022, she starred opposite Benedetta Porcaroli in the Italian coming-of-age comedy Amanda, Carolina Cavalli's debut film. She attended the film's premiere at the 79th Venice International Film Festival.

In 2023, she starred in Junkyard Dog by Jean-Baptiste Durand, La Fille d'Albino Rodrigue by Christine Dory, and The Taste of Things by Trần Anh Hùng. For her performance in Junkyard Dog, she received a nomination for Best Supporting Actress at the 49th César Awards.

== Personal life ==
Bellugi lives in Paris. She is fluent in four languages: French, Italian, Danish and English.

== Filmography ==
=== Film ===
Year	Title	Role	Notes
2005	Les Yeux clairs	Little girl	
2010	Opale plage	Alice	Short film
2011	Elle ne pleure pas, elle chante	Louise	
2015	À 14 ans	Jade	
2015	Keeper	Mélanie	
2016	Heal the Living	Juliette	
2018	The Invisible Boy: Second Generation	Natasha	
2018	The Apparition	Anna	
2019	Golden Youth	Rose	
2021	Tralala	Virginie	
2021	Diario di spezie	Juliette / Rose	
2022	Amanda	Rebecca	
2023	Junkyard Dog	Elsa	
2023	La Fille d'Albino Rodrigue	Rosemay Rodrigue	
2023	The Taste of Things	Violette	
2023	L'Acteur	Herself	Short film
2024	Elle & lui & le reste du monde	Bulle	
2024	Gloria!	Teresa	
2025	How Are You? (Comment ça va?),	Voice role (Lion)	Short animated film screened in Berlinale 2025 on 15 February.
2025	The Girl in the Snow	Aimée Lazare	
2025	The Arrangement	Céleste	
2025	Three Goodbyes	Antonio's colleague	
2025	Five Seconds	Matilde	

=== Television ===
Year	Title	Role	Notes
2006	Sable noir		Short film: Corps étranger
2007–2008	Vous les femmes		5 episodes
2021	H24		Short film: 01H - Under control

== Awards and nominations ==
Award	Date of ceremony	Category	Film	Result	Ref.
César Awards	22 February 2019	Most Promising Actress	The Apparition	Nominated	
César Awards	23 February 2024	Best Supporting Actress	Junkyard Dog	Nominated	
Lumière Awards	4 February 2019	Best Female Revelation	The Apparition	Nominated	
Marrakech International Film Festival	12 December 2015	Best Actress	Keeper	Won	
