= My Little Loves =

1974 French coming-of-age drama film by Jean Eustache

- Directed by: Jean Eustache
- Written by: Jean Eustache
- Produced by: Pierre Cottrell
- Starring: Martin Loeb
- Cinematography: Néstor Almendros
- Release date: 18 December 1974
- Running time: 123 minutes
- Country: France
- Language: French

My Little Loves (French: Mes Petites Amoureuses from a poem by Arthur Rimbaud) is a French coming-of-age drama film written and directed by Jean Eustache, his second and last feature. It was released in 1974 and stars Martin Loeb as an adolescent boy shunted from a tranquil lifestyle at his grandmother's rural abode to his mother's cramped apartment in the city. Ingrid Caven plays the boy's mother. The film was entered into the 9th Moscow International Film Festival.

== Plot ==
This film is a study of a boy growing up in France. Daniel lives with his grandmother in Pessac outside the city of Bordeaux, sharing a naïve and happy childhood with his friends. After one year of secondary school, Daniel has to go to the city of Narbonne to live with his mother. She is a seamstress living in a small apartment with her lover José, a married Spanish farm worker.

Daniel would like to continue school. However, his mother cannot afford it and sends him instead to work as an apprentice in a moped repair shop. Daniel learns about girls from observing others in the cinema, on the street, and advice from other boys in town. When he visits his grandmother next year, he returns as a much more mature boy than his old friends.

== Cast ==
- Martin Loeb as Daniel
- Jacqueline Dufranne as La grand-mère
- Jacques Romain
- Ingrid Caven as La mère
- Marie-Paule Fernandez as Françoise
- Vincent Testanière
- Roger Rizzi
- Anne Stroka
- Cirque Muller
- Syndra Kahn
- Jean-Jacques Bihan

== Production ==
Luc Béraud is assistant director on the movie.

== Reception ==
My Little Loves has an 80% approval rating on Rotten Tomatoes. It is one of Michel Gondry's favorite films.
