= Maladolescenza =

1977 film

- Directed by: Pier Giuseppe Murgia
- Written by: Peter Berling
- Produced by: Franco Cancellieri
- Starring: Martin Leob; Lara Wendel; Eva Ionesco
- Cinematography: Elias Lother Stickelbrucks
- Edited by: Inga Seyric
- Music by: Giuseppe "Pippo" Caruso; Jürgen Drews
- Production companies: Cinema 23 Film; Seven Star Film
- Distributed by: Vis Distribuzione Cinematografica
- Release date: 18 December 1977
- Running time: 91 minutes
- Countries: Italy; West Germany
- Language: Italian

Maladolescenza (German: Spielen wir Liebe) is a 1977 child erotic drama film directed by Pier Giuseppe Murgia.

The film caused significant controversy because of its simulated sex scenes involving underage actresses. Because of these scenes, it was banned in several countries, being labeled as child pornography.

== Plot ==
Laura (Lara Wendel) and Fabrizio (Martin Loeb, age 18) have been meeting every summer in the forest by her parents' summer home. Fabrizio is a solitary boy with only his dog for company; Laura is a sweet girl, but she lacks confidence. This summer new aspects enter into their story as both are growing up. The film represents them as part child, part adult. Part naive, part knowing. Laura is falling in love with Fabrizio, while he displays a new sexual awareness of her masked by his malice.

Fabrizio becomes inexplicably cruel. He accelerates his unwarranted torment of Laura in many ways, including tying her up and putting a snake near her and killing a pet bird she is fond of. Fabrizio prides himself on being 'king of the forest' and rubbishes Laura's tender attempts to be his queen. One day they climb the "Blue Mountain", a mysterious tall mountain at the forest's edge and discover ancient building ruins. Exploring these they find a cave. Inside, Fabrizio seduces and undresses Laura, and the two then engage in a sexual encounter.

Fabrizio's cruel streak is boosted by his new sexual confidence. At one point he virtually forces himself on Laura, much to her upset. He does relent when she makes it clear she wants Fabrizio to be gentle with her, which he ridicules.

Things develop further when they meet Sylvia (Eva Ionesco). Unlike the previously virginal Laura, Sylvia is confident and assertive. Fabrizio develops a fascination with her, eventually bribing Laura to fetch her to the forest to join them in play. Sylvia, aware of Fabrizio's interest in her, asserts herself in his affections, quickly replacing Laura and demoting her to servant and victim, which Fabrizio takes delight in. Laura, reluctant to leave her old friend and new lover, stays and becomes the target of the duo's ever progressing cruelty. At one point, they both 'hunt' Laura with bows and arrows and at another, pretend to throw her off a high ledge. They have sex in front of her, insisting her punishment is that she must watch, leaving Laura confused and heartbroken. Further scenes depict Laura alone, while Sylvia and Fabrizio enjoy one another’s company, rolling nude down a hillside and engaging in intimate sex.

At the end of summer, with the girls talking about returning to school, Fabrizio becomes pensive and agitated. He insists on taking Sylvia to the ruins for the first time. All three of them go into the cave to escape a thunderstorm and Fabrizio again pretends they are lost as he did with Laura. Sylvia breaks down sobbing for her mother, all traces of her confidence and maturity lost in the fear of being in the cave. Fabrizio repeatedly begs Sylvia to stay with him forever. In the morning, Sylvia is still lost in the cave and further rejects the desperate Fabrizio and his pleas to stay with him. She becomes hysterical and he kills her with a knife, feeling it is the only way he won't lose her. He stays with the dead body and gives Laura the flashlight telling her she knows the way home and Laura reluctantly leaves. The film ends with a translation of the poem "Akarsz-e játszani" ("Would You Like to Play?") by Hungarian writer Dezső Kosztolányi.

== Cast ==
- Lara Wendel as Laura
- Eva Ionesco as Silvia
- Martin Loeb as Fabrizio
- Xylot as Iro the dog

== Crew ==
- Directed by: Pier Giuseppe Murgia
- Camera: Lothar Elias Stickelbrucks
- Music: Giuseppe "Pippo" Caruso, Jürgen Drews
- Music Editing: Grandi Firme della Canzone
- Company: Petra Cinema 23/Seven-Star/Petra Cinematografica spa
- Scriptwriter: Peter Berling
- Dialog: Dieter Geissler
- Italian version: Barbara Alberti & Amedeo Pagani
- Cinematography by: Elias Lother Stickelbrucks
- Color Pictures: Technospes Spa, Rome, Italy
- Production Management: Günter Prantl
- Costume Designer: Isolde Jovine
- Audio: Alexander Hillebrand
- Assistant Camera: Wolf Bachmann & Horst Zagolla
- Decorator: Helga Wandl
- Assistant Director: Anita Rakosi
- Film Editing by: Inga Seyric
- Producer: Franco Cancellieri
- Countries: Italy, Austria, Germany

== Filming ==
The film was co-produced by two Munich companies as well as an Italian enterprise, filmed from 17 August to 16 September 1976, in Upper Austria and Carinthia. Chosen to play Sylvia was young Eva Ionesco, herself no stranger to controversy, as her mother was infamous in France for her photos featuring a then five-year-old Ionesco in semi-sexual artistic photography.

In May 1977, at the press conference for the presentation of the film, Eva Ionesco said it was "vulgar, shocking and useless".

== Controversy ==
Maladolescenza is known primarily for its use of a young actor and two 12-year-old pubescent actresses in scenes involving both full frontal and rear nudity, and simulated sexual activity, including oral sex and sexual intercourse.

In Germany, although released uncut in cinemas at 91 minutes in 1977, public outcry caused for several scenes to be removed on its home video releases, namely all instances of nudity, sexuality and death involving children, bringing the running time down to 77 minutes.

In 2004, a German cult DVD distributor restored these cuts in a re-mastered version running at 91 minutes. This version was later banned in a German court on 28 July 2006, condemning the material as child pornography, successfully withdrawing all copies from distribution.

In 2010, a Dutch court ruled that the movie qualifies as child pornography because it depicts the sexual exploitation of children.

Its worldwide circulation is largely unknown to this day, including in Italy and France where seemingly no DVD or home video releases have ever been made available.

== Soundtrack ==
Maladolescenza Soundtrack

Studio album by Pippo Caruso
- Released: May 1977, July 2004
- Recorded: 30 December 1976 – 3 January 1977
- Genre: Soundtrack
- Length: 31:43 (1977), 49:21 (2004)
- Labels: Cinevox Records, Digitmovies AE

The music was recorded in stereo at Dirmaphon Studios, Rome, Italy. The original release contained the first 18 tracks.

1. "Maladolescenza" (02:23)
2. "L'incubo e il serpente" (02:12)
3. "Citta segreta" (01:59)
4. "Il labirinto" (02:40)
5. "Re e buffone" (00:50)
6. "La villa misteriosa" (01:06)
7. "Silvia" (01:25)
8. "Caccia a Laura" (01:40)
9. "Il sopravvento" (01:07)
10. "Cara adolescenza" (02:01)
11. "Scambio di consegne" (02:29)
12. "Ninna nanna a nascondino" (02:07)
13. "Silvia e Fabrizio" (01:59)
14. "Identificazione" (03:26)
15. "La villa di notte" (01:13)
16. "È già autunno" (01:19)
17. "Adagio per oboe" (01:06)
18. "La notte dell'attesa" (02:13)
19. "Maladolescenza" (02:44) Alternate Take #1
20. "Silvia" (01:10) Alternate Take #1 Harpiscord & Orchestra
21. "Maladolescenza" (02:55) Il Recinto Dei Giochi
22. "Silvia" (02:28) Alternate Take #2 - Music Box
23. "Il labirinto" (Part 2) (01:10)
24. "Silvia" (01:29) Alternate Take #3 - Solo Flute
25. "Maladolescenza" (01:54) Kamasutra
26. "Scambio di consegne" (02:28) Alternate Take
27. "Silvia" (02:02) Alternate Take #4 - Harp & Orchestra
