= Constantin Georges Macris =

French painter of Greek origin

Constantin Georges Macris (Greek: Κωνσταντίνος Γεώργιος Μακρής; 7 April 1917 in Cairo, Egypt – 4 September 1984 in Orsay, France) was a French painter of Greek origin.

== Biography ==
Native of Cephalonia, Constantin Macris's family moved to Egypt at the turn of the twentieth century. Macris studied art at the Leonardo da Vinci Academy in Cairo, where he held his first exhibitions as well as in Alexandria. He decided to go to Paris upon discovering the works of Picasso and Matisse in the cosmopolitan Egypt of the 1930s, but his plans were postponed for ten years because of the war which he fought with the Hellenic Air Force. Constantin Macris finally moved to Paris in 1948.

His debut in the French capital focused on training. He studied the writings of art historian and theorist Pierre Francastel and joined in 1949-1950 Fernand Léger’s studio, whose classes he paid for working as an interpreter for the American students who benefited from the G.I. Bill. Macris explored in that period the fundaments of geometric abstraction and Neoplasticism. He found his way by drawing his inspiration from the play of sunlight in trees and presented his work to Pierre Loeb who contracted him as an artist within his gallery in 1954. The Galerie Pierre was since 1924 a leading gallery in Paris. Macris went on to become one of the representatives of the new School of Paris The artist married the Dutch sculptor Pauline Eecen (1925) in 1956 and moved to the Netherlands from 1958 to 1960, where he began a new cycle of study on landscape. Further to the closure of the Galerie Pierre when Pierre Loeb died in 1964, Macris chose not to work with another art dealer as he wanted to be free and pursue his artistic research independently.

== Work ==
After an informative period (1948-1954), Constantin Macris returned to figurative painting, producing studies from nature (foliage, trees, landscapes, then the human figure in which he pursued an abstract sense of composition. On the occasion of Macris's second exhibition in 1957, Jacques Viot wrote: "Despite appearances, you will find that he is not a non-figurative painter, and least of all an abstract painter. Macris paints from nature. He is, quite simply, a painter. There is no need for a qualifier. But... do we, in our modern world, still know what a painter is? Maybe it's time we went back to the museums to understand the true meaning of the word." Macris revealed the full scope of his mastery through large-format works such as Composition in 1955; as Roger van Gindertael noted the following year, he was well aware of the stakes involved in plastic art.

The relationship to light is the central link in his gradual evolution from landscape to the human figure. What Macris wrote in the exhibition catalogue of 1959, “My starting point is always a source of light which gives me an order; it is never a precise nor a defined form” remained true for the last twenty years. He studied the Dutch painters of the seventeenth century, in particular Frans Hals, and developed a technique lush with varnish that plays on superimposed colours and transparencies.

== Exhibitions ==
=== Personal exhibitions ===
- 1956, Galerie Pierre (Paris)
- 1957, Galerie Pierre (Paris)
- 1959, Albert Loeb Gallery (New York)

=== Collective exhibitions ===
- 1955, Pittsburgh International Exhibition of Contemporary Art
- 1956, Salon des Réalités Nouvelles (Paris)
- 1957, Salon de Mai (Paris)
- 1957, Salon des Réalités Nouvelles (Paris)
- 1957, École de Paris, Galerie Charpentier (Paris)
- 1958, Salon de Mai (Paris)
- 1958, Pittsburgh International Exhibition of Contemporary Art
- 1960, Twelve Greek Artists, Redfern Gallery (London)
- 1962, Peintres et sculpteurs grecs de Paris, Museum of Modern Art in the city of Paris
- 1964, Miroir et mémoire du premier salon international de galeries pilotes, Cantonal Museum of Fine Arts (Lausanne)
- 1979, L’aventure de Pierre Loeb. La Galerie Pierre, Paris 1924-1964, Museum of Modern Art of the city of Paris, Museum of Ixelles (Brussels)
- 1983, Peintres grecs d’Égypte 1860-1920, Museum of Modern Art (Athens)
- 1995, Zij waren anders [They were different], Museum Kranenburgh (Bergen, Netherlands)
- 2017, (fr + el) Neuf peintres grecs abstraits à Paris dans les années 1950, Orangerie du Sénat (Paris)
- 2019, (fr + en) Pauline Eecen & Constantin Macris, une aventure artistique, Galerie MR14 (Paris), in partnership with the Kranenburgh Museum in Bergen (Netherlands), the Hellenic Cultural Centre in Paris, and FauveParis
