= Disenchanting Les Bons Temps: Identity and Authenticity in Cajun Music and Dance =

2003 book by Charles J. Stivale

- Author: Charles J. Stivale
- Language: English
- Series: Post-Contemporary Interventions
- Subject: Cultural Studies, ethnomusicology
- Publisher: Duke University Press
- Publication date: 2003
- Pages: 217
- ISBN: 0-8223-3020-2

Disenchanting Les Bons Temps: Identity and Authenticity in Cajun Music and Dance is a 2003 book by Charles J. Stivale. The book covers Cajun music and dance. The book is part of Duke University Press' Post-Contemporary Interventions series.
