= Martin Loeb (actor) =

French actor and artist (1959–2025)

- Born: 11 March 1959; Paris, France
- Died: 22 March 2025 (aged 66)
- Occupation(s): Actor, artist

Martin Loeb (11 March 1959 – 22 March 2025) was a French actor and artist.

== Life and career ==
Born in Paris on 11 March 1959, Loeb was the son of Albert Loeb and Cécile Odartchenko; his grandfathers were Russian poet and painter Georges Odartchenko and gallery owner Pierre Loeb. His sister was actress Caroline Loeb. In the 2010s, he exhibited his engravings at his mother's art gallery in Bordeaux.

In 1974, Loeb landed the lead role of Daniel in the Jean Eustache film My Little Loves. He also appeared in films directed by Pier Giuseppe Murgia.

Loeb died on 22 March 2025, at the age of 66.

== Filmography ==
- My Little Loves (1974)
- Second Chance (1976)
- Maladolescenza (1977)
- Roberte (1979)
