= The Apparition (2018 film) =

2018 film directed by Xavier Giannoli

- Theatrical release poster
- French: L'Apparition
- Directed by: Xavier Giannoli
- Written by: Xavier Giannoli; Jacques Fieschi; Marcia Romano
- Produced by: Olivier Delbosc
- Starring: Vincent Lindon; Galatea Bellugi; Patrick d'Assumçao; Elina Löwensohn; Gérard Dessalles; Bruno Georis; Claude Lévêque
- Cinematography: Éric Gautier
- Edited by: Cyril Nakache
- Production companies: Curiosa Films; France Télévisions; Canal+; Ciné+; Proximus; La Cinéfacture; Cofinova 14; Cinémage 12; CNC; Imaginarium Films
- Distributed by: Memento Films
- Release date: 14 February 2018 (France)
- Running time: 144 minutes
- Countries: France; Belgium; Jordan
- Languages: French; English; German; Italian
- Budget: $9.7 million
- Box office: $3.6 million

The Apparition (French: L'Apparition) is an internationally co-produced drama film, directed by Xavier Giannoli, from a screenplay by Giannoli, Jacques Fieschi and Marcia Romano. It stars Vincent Lindon, Galatea Bellugi, Patrick d'Assumçao, Elina Löwensohn, Gérard Dessalles, Bruno Georis and Claude Lévêque.

It was released in France on 14 February 2018, by Memento Films.

== Plot ==
A respected journalist is summoned by the Vatican to investigate a young girl who claims to have seen an apparition of the Virgin Mary in a remote village in southern France.

== Cast ==
- Vincent Lindon as Jacques Mayano
- Galatea Bellugi as Anna
- Patrick d'Assumçao as Pére Borrodine
- Elina Löwensohn as Docteur de Villeneuve
- Gérard Dessalles as Stéphane Mornay
- Bruno Georis as Pére Ezéradot
- Claude Lévêque as Pére Gallois
- Anatole Taubman as Anton Meyer
- Alicia Hava as Mériem

== Production ==
In January 2017, it was announced Vincent Lindon, Galatea Bellugi and Patrick d'Assumçao had joined the cast of the film, with Xavier Giannoli directing from a screenplay he wrote, alongside Jacques Fieschi and Marcia Romano.

The film was shot in Gap (Hautes-Alpes), at the Palazzo Farnese in Rome, at the Zaatari refugee camp in Jordan and in the Île-de-France region.

== Release ==
The film was released in France on 14 February 2018, by Memento Films. In February 2018, Music Box Films acquired U.S. distribution rights to the film. It was released in the United States on 7 September 2018.

== Critical reception ==
The Apparition received positive reviews from film critics. It holds a 73% approval rating on review aggregator website Rotten Tomatoes, based on 44 reviews, with an average of 6.4/10. The site's critical consensus reads, "The Apparition intrigues on a purely narrative level while also managing to tackle thorny questions of faith with suitably sober intelligence." On Metacritic, the film holds a rating of 64 out of 100, based on 9 critics, indicating "generally favorable reviews".
