= Nathalie Gassel =

Belgian writer and photographer (born 1964)

- Born: 19 June 1964 (age 61); Brussels, Belgium
- Occupations: photographer, writer

Nathalie Gassel (born 19 June 1964) is a Belgian writer and photographer.

== Life ==
Gassel was born in Brussels, she is also known as a Muay Thai sportsperson. She contributed to the 1999 work entitled Picturing the Modern Amazon, which was translated by Pierre Samuel and published by New Museum of Contemporary Art in New York City. She has made public appearances and her writings have been published by the University of Brussels Review. Nathalie Gassel's writing exposes her life as an athlete and details her muscular physique and is expressed in her 2001 book Eros Androgyne and Musculatures. These two works celebrate her strong body. Her decisive writing in The Years of Insignificance probes the adversities of her torn and troubled childhood. Gassel has also created a photographic publication Récit Plastique.

"In a readily traditional prose with quasi-nervous tension that vibrates constantly building intensity," describes the philosopher Frank Pierobon, "Récit Plastique recounts this through dialogue texts and photographs. This body with body, between writings and images, oscillates between instincts of life and death, leading to a marbled reflection of abstractions."

Interview of Pierre Mertens on "Strategie d'une passion" by Thierry Génicot RTBF

== French bibliography ==
- Eros androgyne, Éditions Le Cercle poche, 2001, preface by Pierre Bourgeade
- Musculatures, Les Éditions Le Cercle, Paris, 2001; Editions, Le Cercle poche, 2005, preface by Sarane Alexandrian
- Stratégie d'une passion, Éditions Luce Wilquin, 2004 preface by Pierre Mertens
- Construction d'un corps pornographique, Éditions Le Cercle d'Art, Paris, 2005, Paris, 2005
- Des années d'insignifiance, Éditions Luce Wilquin, 2006
- Récit plastique, texts and photographs, Éditions Le somnambule équivoque, 2008
- Abattement, Editions Maelström, Bruxelles, 2009
- Ardeur et vacuité, Editions Le Somnambule équivoque, 2012

== Reviews and collectives ==
- Picturing the modern amazon Newmuseumbooks, Rizzoli International Publications, New York. 1999.
- Le Labyrinthe des apparences Ed. Complexe. 2000. Université de Bruxelles.
- Je t'aime. Question d'époque Ed. Complexe. 2002. Université de Bruxelles.
- Argent, valeurs et valeur Ed. Complexe. 2004. Université de Bruxelles.
- L'obscénité des sentiments, Ed. Le Cercle d'Art & Université de Bruxelles, 2005.
- Théorie et pratique de la création, Les Cahiers internationaux du symbolisme. 2005
- La visite est terminée, photographie et texte, Ed. La Trame, Bruxelles, 2006
- Marginales, n° 262, Sous les clichés la rage, photographie, 2006 Ed. Luce Wilquin, Belgique
- Action Poétique, n° 185, Belges et Belges, septembre 2006, Paris.
- Mode, photographie et texte, ed. Le Cercle d'art & Université de Bruxelles, Paris, 2008
