= Sarane Alexandrian =

French philosopher, essayist, and art critic

Sarane Alexandrian (15 June 1927, Baghdad – 11 September 2009, Ivry-sur-Seine) was a French philosopher, essayist, and art critic.

== Early life ==
Alexandrian was born to a French mother and Armenian father, Vartan Alexandrian, a stomatologist under the service of Faisal I. At the age of six, he was sent to Paris to stay with his maternal grandmother.

== Literary career ==
Alexandrian's initiation to Dada and surrealism came in the summer of 1943 when, aged 16, he met Raoul Hausmann who was staying in Peyrat-le-Château near Limoges as a refugee. From 1947, he served as the last secretary of André Breton and became an essential figure of the surrealist current.

Alexandrian was an advocate of the philosophy Nietzsche advanced in The Gay Science (Die fröhliche Wissenschaft). He headed the journal Supérieur Inconnu (a title provided by Breton), which exalts four values shared by the surrealists and Alexandrian: dreams, love, knowledge, and revolution. Catherine Millet is one notable contributor to the magazine.

Alexandrian was a friend of Victor Brauner, and remained an admirer of Charles Fourier, and an ardent defender of Mata Hari.

== Works ==
Alexandrian has more than 40 books to his credit. His best known works are:

- André Breton par lui-même, 1971 (André Breton in His Own Words);
- Hans Bellmer, 1971;
- Les Libérateurs de l'amour, 1977 (The Liberators of Love);
- Surrealist Art, 1985 (Thames & Hudson World of Art);
- Max Ernst, 1986;
- Histoire de la littérature érotique, 1989 (The History of Erotic Literature);
- LJUBA, Paris, Cercle d'Art, 2003.

== Texts and Prefaces ==
Préfaces in Musculatures of Nathalie Gassel
