= Irina Ionesco =

French photographer (1930–2022)

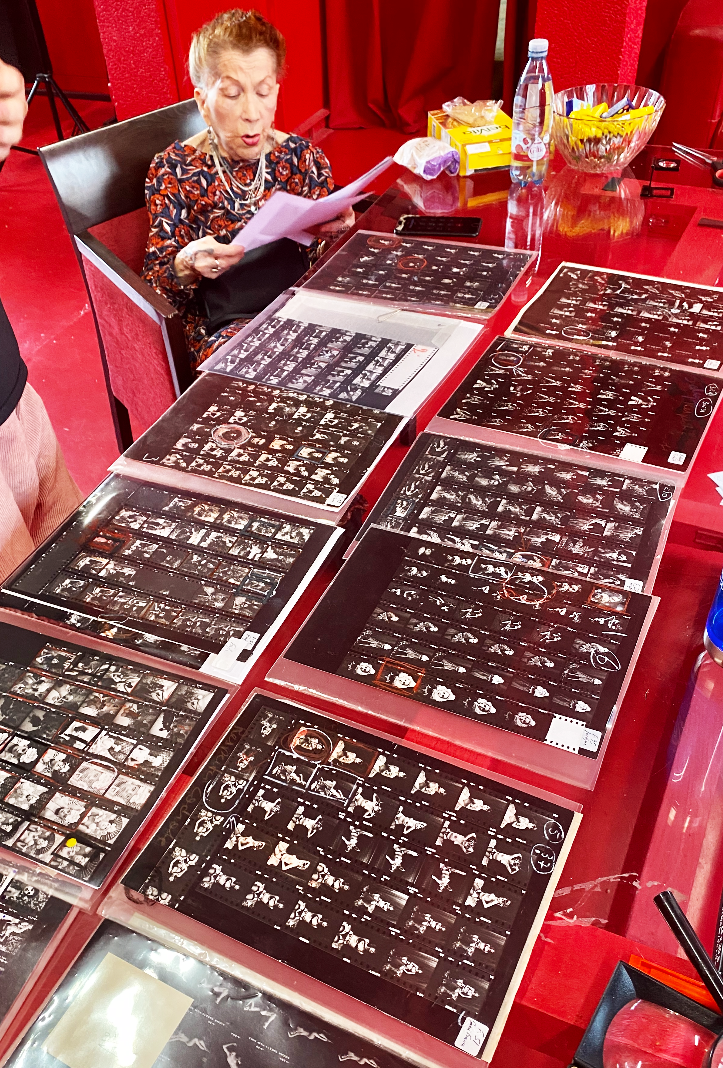
- Ionesco in 2020
- Born: 3 September 1930; Paris, France
- Died: 25 July 2022 (aged 91)
- Occupation: Photographer
- Children: Eva Ionesco

Irina Ionesco (3 September 1930 – 25 July 2022) was a French photographer. She traveled and painted for several years before discovering photography and eventually became known for her erotic photography and most controversially for using her pre-pubescent daughter as a model.

== Early life ==
Ionesco was born to Romanian immigrants living in Paris. Her parents were from Constanța; her father was a violinist, and her mother a trapeze artist. According to Ionesco's daughter, Ionesco was the product of father-daughter incest.

From the age of 4 to 15 her parents sent her to Romania where she was raised by her family who were circus performers. After the Soviet occupation of Romania, she returned to Paris. From the ages of 15 to 22 she performed as a contortionist.

In 1965, she gave birth to her only child, Eva Ionesco, whom she would later sexually exploit throughout her career.

== Photography career ==
In 1974 she exhibited some of her work at the Nikon Gallery in Paris and attracted much attention. She was soon published in numerous magazines, books, and featured at galleries across the globe.

Irina Ionesco is most famous for her photographs showcasing her young daughter, Eva. Ionesco began taking photographs of her daughter when she was four years old in 1969 though she did not display them publicly or gain prominence for her works until 1974. The nudes she created with Eva were immediately controversial as Eva was posed in the same manner as Ionesco's much older models. Ionesco notably photographed Eva nude for the cover of Der Spiegel which was later expunged from the magazine's records and also allowed pictures she took of Eva to appear in the Spanish edition of Penthouse. Ionesco also allowed her daughter to appear nude for other photographers, including Jacques Bourboulon.

Ionesco continued to use her daughter as her muse until Eva was 12 years old, at which point social services intervened and Ionesco was stripped of custody of her daughter. Over the following years the two would have a fractured relationship, with Eva asserting her mother was abusive and fighting for control of the images she appeared in.

A major part of Irina's work features lavishly dressed women, decked out in jewels, gloves, and other finery, but also adorning themselves with symbolic pieces such as chokers and other fetishistic props, posing provocatively and partially disrobed.

Ionesco published numerous books featuring her works. In 2004 she published a memoir, L'œil de la poupée.

== Legal disputes ==
In 2012 Ionesco was found guilty of infringing her daughter Eva's privacy and copyright. She was ordered to pay her daughter €10,000 in damages and to hand over some of the negatives to the nude photos she had taken when her daughter was underaged. In 2015, the Paris court of appeal increased the sum to €70,000 and prohibited Ionesco from exhibiting, showing and circulating non-consensual images of her daughter.

In 2015 Ionesco sued her son-in-law, writer Simon Liberati, for passages he had written in his book Eva, which described her in ways she found unflattering. The suit was ultimately unsuccessful.

== Works ==
- Liliacées langoureuses aux parfums d’Arabie (1974)
- Femmes sans tain (1975)
- Nocturnes (1976)
- Litanies pour une amante funèbre (1976)
- Le temple aux miroirs (1977) ISBN 0-686-54740-3
- Cent onze photographies érotiques (1980)
- Le divan (1981)
- Les Passions (1984) ISBN 2-903901-05-8
- The eros of Baroque (1988)
- Les immortelles (1991) ISBN 2-85949-128-7
- Egypte chambre noire (1991)
- Méditerranéennes (1991, with Elisabeth Foch) ISBN 2-85949-124-4
- Kafka ou le passant de Prague (1992) ISBN 2-7107-0483-8
- TransEurope (1994)
- Metamorphose de la Medusa (1995; model Hiromi Koide)
- Nudes (1996) ISBN 3-908162-52-1
- Eva: Eloge De Ma Fille (2004) ISBN 0-9727073-1-X
- L'œil de la poupée (2004; with Marie Desjardins) ISBN 2-7210-0485-9
- R (2004) ISBN 4-309-90604-4
- Le Japon Interdit (2004) ISBN 2-9523045-0-5
- Master Set, Edition YNOX Paris (2014), ISBN 978-2-36699-017-1
- Sylvia Kristel, Edition YNOX Paris (2014), ISBN 978-2-36699-012-6 (Edition de tête) & ISBN 978-2-36699-013-3 (Edition courante)
