= Pippo Caruso =

Italian composer, conductor, and music arranger (1935–2018)

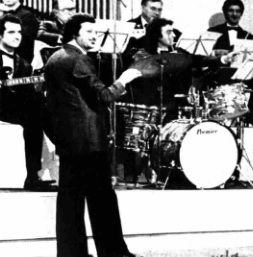
- Caruso directs the orchestra of the 1975 RAI TV-show Un colpo di fortuna
- Born: 22 December 1935; Belpasso, Italy
- Died: 28 May 2018 (aged 82); Fara in Sabina, Italy
- Known for: Composer, conductor and music arranger
- Scientific career
- Fields: Musics

Giuseppe Caruso (22 December 1935 – 28 May 2018), best known as Pippo Caruso, was an Italian composer, conductor and music arranger.

== Biography ==
Born in Belpasso, Catania, Caruso linked his professional success to the television presenter Pippo Baudo, who had been his university fellow and whom Caruso regularly flanked as conductor in his TV programs starting from Canzonissima 1973. Caruso composed several successful songs, including Mita Medici's "A ruota libera" and Lorella Cuccarini/Alessandra Martines' "L'amore è", and, starting from the sixties, Caruso also wrote several film soundtracks, such as Kill Johnny Ringo and Maladolescenza.
