= Rembrandt (1999 film) =

1999 film

- Directed by: Charles Matton
- Starring: Klaus Maria Brandauer; Johanna ter Steege
- Distributed by: Pyramide Distribution (France); Upstream Pictures (Netherlands)
- Release date: 9 August 1999
- Running time: 1h 43min
- Countries: Germany; France; Netherlands
- Languages: French; English

Rembrandt is a 1999 international coproduction biographical film directed by Charles Matton.

== Cast ==
- Klaus Maria Brandauer - Rembrandt van Rijn
- Johanna ter Steege - Saskia Uylenburgh
- Romane Bohringer - Hendrickje Stoffels
- Jean Rochefort - Nicolaes Tulp
- Jean-Philippe Écoffey - Jan Six
- Caroline van Houten - Geertje Dircx
- Richard Bohringer - Le prêcheur
- Franck de la Personne - Hendrick Uylenburgh
- Jacques Spiesser - Joost Van den Vondel
- Caroline Silhol - Maria Tesselschade
- Nicholas Palliser - Constantijn Huygens
- François Delaive - Govert Flinck
- Léonard Matton - Titus van Rijn
- Ludivine Sagnier - Cornelia van Rijn
