= Spermula =

- Directed by: Charles Matton
- Screenplay by: Charles Matton
- Produced by: Bernard Lenteric
- Starring: Dayle Haddon; Udo Kier; François Dunoyer
- Cinematography: Jean-Jacques Flori
- Edited by: Sarah Matton; Isabelle Rathery
- Music by: José Bartel
- Production companies: 5 Continents; Film and Co.
- Distributed by: Parafrance
- Release date: 1976 (France)
- Running time: 103 minutes
- Country: France
- Language: French

Spermula is a 1976 French erotic fantasy film directed by Charles Matton and starring Canadian super model Dayle Haddon.

There were two versions of the film at the time of the original release, with different dialogue and plot - one in French and one in English. The French version originally was released with the title L'amour est un fleuve en Russie and is less of a space opera than is the English-language version which leans more towards science fiction.

== Plot of English-language version ==
In the 1930s in the United States, a cult, composed of rich and eccentric libertines who reject any idea of love and considered artistic creation as a form of evil, tried to find in total sexual freedom the ecstasy of pure being. Following a conference held in New York in 1937, all members of the cult disappeared.

Years later a journalist tracked them down to a secret location in the forests of South America, but is not heard from again.

Years later, a rocket ship brings Spermula and her cohorts back to civilization. To broadcast their message of peace and freedom to a world gone mad, the Spermulites begin "spermulising" men, which involves drawing off their sexual essence that causes aggression, acquisitiveness and jealousy.

The Spermulites take up residence in a mansion, whose neighbors include the town's mayor, his unhappy and abused wife, his assistant and a widow. Spermula and her company spermulize individual men preparatory to spermulizing society with an orgy. The women become corrupted by contact with the outside world and their beautiful leader, Spermula, falls in love with a young artist and sacrifices her immortality for a night of passion with him.

== Production ==
Spermula was developed with the working title L'amour est un fleuve en Russie (Love is a River in Russia, a pun which replaces the French word for love with the homophonic name of the Russian river Amur).

There are two different versions of the movie, with totally different plots. The French-language original, which has explicit erotica in it, is 103 minutes long whilst the English-dubbed version released in the United States has a running time of 88 minutes. The English-language version turned the women of the secret society into extraterrestrials, excised the most explicit scenes, changed the order of the scenes it retained, and added footage from the sci-fi movie Silent Running.

The original French-language version may or may not have included nude footage of Eva Ionesco, who was 11 years old when nude photos of her from the Spermula set appeared in magazines. She is billed in the movie as "Petite fille" but no extant version of the film has any footage of her in it, which means that the magazine stories may have been publicity stunts.

== Release ==
Spermula was released in France in 1976.

== Footnotes ==
=== References ===
- Browning, John Edgar; Picart, Caroline Joan (Kay) (2014). Dracula in Visual Media. McFarland. ISBN 978-0786462018.
