= Golden Youth (film) =

2019 film

- Film poster
- French: Une jeunesse dorée
- Directed by: Eva Ionesco
- Written by: Eva Ionesco
- Starring: Isabelle Huppert
- Release date: 16 January 2019
- Running time: 118 minutes
- Country: France
- Language: French

Golden Youth (French: Une jeunesse dorée) is a 2019 French drama film directed by Eva Ionesco and starring Isabelle Huppert. The film stars Galatéa Bellugi as Rose, a hard partying teenager growing up in the 1980s, whose older boyfriend introduces her to a wealthy older couple who have no sexual taboos.

== Cast ==
- Isabelle Huppert as Lucile Wood
- Galatéa Bellugi as Rose
- Melvil Poupaud as Hubert Robert
- Lukas Ionesco as Michel
- Alain-Fabien Delon as Adrien
