= Charles J. Stivale =

American literary scholar (born 1949)

Charles Joseph Stivale
- Born: 1949; Bloomfield, New Jersey, U.S.

Academic background
- Education: Knox College, Sorbonne-Paris IV, University of Illinois Urbana-Champaign
- Thesis: Oeuvre de sentiment, oeuvre de combat: La Trilogie Jacques Vingras de Jules Vallès (1981)
- Doctoral advisor: Robert J. Nelson

Academic work
- Era: 1980–present
- Discipline: French literature, critical theory
- Institutions: Wayne State University
- Main interests: 19th-century French novels, contemporary critical theory and cultural studies, and writings of Gilles Deleuze and Félix Guattari

Charles Joseph Stivale (born 1949) is an American scholar of French literature and critical theory, author, literary critic, and academic. Stivale is particularly known for his work on Gilles Deleuze and Félix Guattari. He is Distinguished Professor Emeritus of French at Wayne State University (WSU).

As a professor of French literature, Stivale has contributed to the narrative study of the nineteenth-century French authors Stendhal, Jules Vallès and Guy de Maupassant. He also studied Louisiana's cultural heritage in Cajun dance and music. His work on Deleuze and Guattari has included critical studies, translations, and he currently serves as co-director (with Daniel W. Smith) of the Deleuze Seminars project.

== Early life and education ==
Stivale was born in Bloomfield, New Jersey and attended Cascia Hall Preparatory School in Tulsa, Oklahoma, graduating in 1967. He earned his B.A. from Knox College in Galesburg, Illinois in 1971. He then pursued graduate studies at Sorbonne-Paris IV, where he completed his M.A. in 1973 and a Maîtrise in 1974. He obtained his Ph.D. from the University of Illinois Urbana-Champaign in 1981.

== Academic career ==
While a graduate student at Illinois, Stivale directed the Knox College Junior Year Program in Besançon, France (1976–77). His teaching career began as a lecturer at Western Michigan University (1980–1981). He directed the CIEE Junior Year Abroad Program at the University of Haute-Bretagne in Rennes, France (1981–1982). He was an assistant professor at Franklin & Marshall College (1982–1986). In 1986, he moved to Louisiana and taught French at Tulane University until 1990, when he joined WSU as an associate professor.

As a faculty member at WSU, Stivale was awarded tenure in 1992 and was promoted to full professor in 1996. He served as the Chair of the Department of Romance Languages and Literatures from 1996 to 2002 and as the interim Chair of the Department of Art and Art History from 2002 to 2003. In 2005, he was appointed as a Distinguished Professor and retired in 2019.

== Contributions and publications ==
Stivale has published extensively on French literature, critical theory, and Cajun culture, including in-depth studies of Cajun dance and music. His notable books include The Two-Fold Thought of Deleuze and Guattari: Intersections and Animations (1998), which received the Choice Outstanding Academic Book Award; Disenchanting Les Bons Temps: Identity and Authenticity in Cajun Music and Dance (2003); and a study of friendship in Gilles Deleuze's works, Gilles Deleuze’s ABC’s: The Folds of Friendship (2008). These three books received the Wayne State University Board of Governors Faculty Recognition Award.

Stivale has also prepared translations of different critical and philosophical works: Gilles Deleuze, Logic of Sense (with Mark Lester), Franco Berardi (Bifo), Félix Guattari: Thought, Friendship, and Visionary Cartography (with Giuseppina Mecchia), Gilles Deleuze and Claire Parnet, Gilles Deleuze, From A to Z (DVD), and Gilles Deleuze, On Painting (in press). Since 2019, he has developed with Daniel W. Smith the Deleuze Seminars project at Purdue University.

== Honors and awards ==
- French Government Scholarship (1973–1974)
- WSU Career Development Chair (1993–1994)
- Wayne State University Academy of Scholars induction (2000)
- Wayne State University Board of Governors Distinguished Faculty Fellowship (2000–2002)
- WSU Distinguished Graduate Faculty Award (2003)
- Wayne State University Board of Governors Faculty Recognition Awards for his books (1999, 2004, 2009)

== Selected works ==
=== Books ===
==== In French ====
- Oeuvre de Sentiment Oeuvre de Combat: La Trilogie de Jules Vallès (1988) (Note: Based on his doctoral dissertation (1981) bearing the same title. Open access, published by Presses universitaires de Lyon.)
- La Temporalité Romanesque chez Stendhal: "L'Echafaudage de la Bâtisse" (1989)

==== In English ====
- The Art of Rupture: Narrative Desire and Duplicity in the Tales of Guy de Maupassant (1994)
- The Two-Fold Thought of Deleuze and Guattari: Intersections and Animations (1998)
- Disenchanting Les Bons Temps: Identity and Authenticity in Cajun Music and Dance (2003)
- Gilles Deleuze’s ABC’s: The Folds of Friendship (2008)
- Unfolding the Deleuze Seminars, 1970-1987. Summaries and Commentary (Edinburgh University Press, 2025)

=== Edited books ===
- Modern French Literary Studies in the Classroom: Pedagogical Strategies (New York: MLA Publications, 2004).
- Gilles Deleuze: Key Concepts, edited volume (2005, 2nd ed. 2012)
- Gilles Deleuze: Image and Text, co-ed. with Eugene W. Holland and Daniel W. Smith 2009).

=== Translations ===
- Franco Berardi ‘Bifo’, Félix Guattari: Thought, Friendship, and Visionary Cartography (with Giuseppina Mecchia, Palgrave MacMillan 2008)
- Subtitles in English, Gilles Deleuze, From A to Z (Zone1 DVD production of L’Abécédaire de Gilles Deleuze, 8-hour video interview) (2012)
- Gilles Deleuze, The Logic of Sense, (with Mark Lester with Charles J. Stivale. Ed. Constantin V. Boundas, 1990; 2nd ed. Bloomsbury, 2015)
- Gilles Deleuze, On Painting, ed. David Lapoujade, with the Deleuze Seminars Translation Collective (Minneapolis: University of Minnesota Press, 2025)
- Gilles Deleuze, On Spinoza, ed. David Lapoujade, with the Deleuze Seminars Translation Collective (Minneapolis: University of Minnesota Press, forthcoming).

=== Book chapters ===
- "Of Heccéités and Ritournelles: Movement and Affect in the Cajun Dance Arena." In Articulating the Global and the Local, eds. Ann Cvetkovich and Douglas Kellner (1997) pp. 129–148.
- "Spam: Heteroglossia and harassment in cyberspace." In Internet culture, ed. David Porter (1997) pp. 133–144.
- "Feeling the Event: ‘Spaces of Affect' and the Cajun Dance Arena,” in Animations [of Deleuze and Guattari], ed. Jennifer Daryl Slack (2003), pp. 31–58.
- Introduction, “Rethinking (with) Félix Guattari,” in Félix Guattari, Soft Subversions: Texts and Interviews. 1977-1985, ed. Sylvère Lotringer (2009), pp. 9–17.
- “Flux de Vitalité, Flux de Pouvoir: La Science à l'œuvre.” In Masculinités en Révolution, de Rousseau à Balzac, eds. Jean-Marie Roulin and Daniel Maira. (2013) pp. 97–114.
- “Etre aux aguets: Deleuze, Creation and Territorialization”. In The Animal Catalyst: Towards Ahuman Theory, ed. Patricia MacCormack (2014), pp. 69–80.
- “One or Several Ralphs: Multiplicity and Masculinity in Sand’s Indiana.” In Approaches to Teaching George Sand’s Indiana, eds. David A. Powell and Pratima Prasad (2016), pp. 109–117.
- “Hannibal ‘aux aguets’: On the Lookout for New Refrains.” In Deleuze and the Animal, eds. Colin Gardner and Patricia MacCormack (2017), pp. 197-227.
- “Gilles Deleuze, A Man Out of Time.” In Deleuze and Time, eds. Robert W. Luzecky and Daniel W. Smith (2023), pp. 234–257.

=== Podcasts and interviews ===
- Stivale, Charles J.; Smith, Daniel W. (2025-10-21). "Gilles Deleuze, On Painting" (Podcast). New Books Network.
- Stivale, Charles J.; Adkins, Taylor; Cherry, Cooper (2025-08-12). "Deleuze and Guattari – How Do You Make Yourself A Body Without Organs" (Podcast). Machinic Unconscious Happy Hour.
- Stivale, Charles J. (2025-08-08). "From Chaos to Creation: Deleuze, Francis Bacon, 'On Painting', and 'The Logic of Sensation'" (Podcast). Acid Horizon.
- Stivale, Charles J.; Smith, Daniel W. (2024-07-10). Archive Madness (Lecture). 2024 Deleuze and Guattari colloquium, TU Delft, Holland – via YouTube.
- Charles Stivale, Dan Smith (2023-06-29). "Deleuze on Painting and Cinema". The Machinic Unconscious Happy Hour (Podcast).
- Charles Stivale (2020-10-23). The Lost Deleuze Tapes ft. Deleuze Translator Charles Stivale. Deleuze & Guattari. Plastic Pills Podcast.
- Cooper Cherry (2020-07-14). "Charles Stivale – The ABCs of Deleuze". The Machinic Unconscious Happy Hour (Podcast).
