= Pierre Bourgeade =

French writer and photographer (1927–2009)

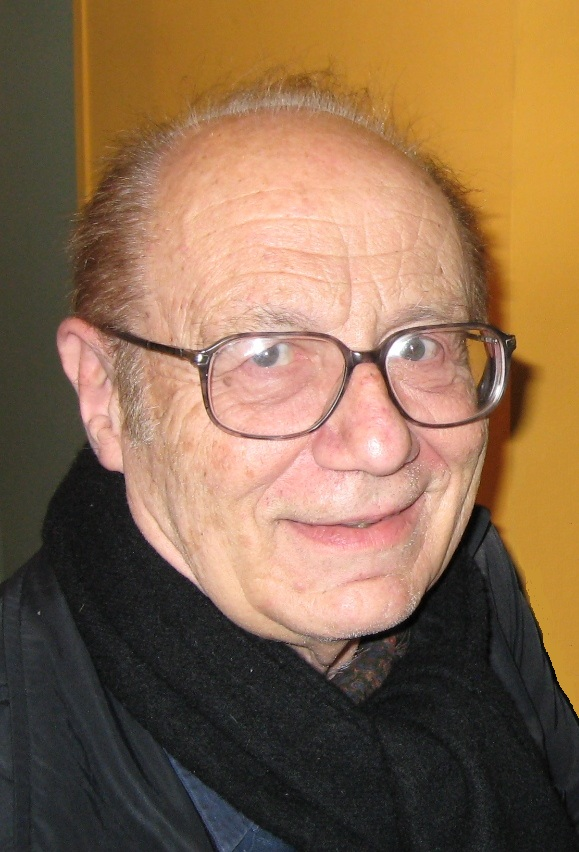
- Born: 7 November 1927; Morlanne, France
- Died: 12 March 2009 (aged 81); Loches, France
- Occupations: Novelist; Playwright; Poet

Signature
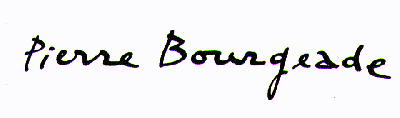

Pierre Bourgeade (7 November 1927 – 12 March 2009) was a French man of letters, playwright, poet, writer, director, journalist, literary critic and photographer. A descendant of Jean Racine, he was also the brother-in-law of the writer Paule Constant.

== Work ==
=== Prizes ===
- 1966: Prix Hermès-ESCP (Les Immortelles, Gallimard)
- 1976: Prix du Syndicat de la Critique dramatique (Palazzo Mentale)
- 1979: Prix Max Barthou de l'Académie française (Une ville grise, Gallimard)
- 1983: Prix Mottart de l'Académie française + sélection Prix Goncourt (Les Serpents, Gallimard)
- 1990: Prix du public et de la photographie Monte-Carlo (Quartier nègre)
- 1998: Grand prix Paul-Féval de littérature populaire of the Société des Gens de Lettres (Pitbull, Gallimard)
- 2009: Prix spécial du jury Sade (Éloge des fétichistes (Tristram)

== Selected bibliography ==
=== Novels ===
- 1968: La Rose rose (Gallimard "Le Chemin")
- 1969: New York Party (Gallimard "Le Chemin")
- 1973: L'Aurore boréale (Gallimard "Le Chemin")
- 1977: L'Armoire (Gallimard "Collection Blanche" - rééd. Folio #2446)
- 1978: Une ville grise (Gallimard "Le Chemin")
- 1979: Le Camp (Gallimard "Le Chemin")
- 1981: Le Football, c'est la guerre poursuivie par d'autres moyens (Gallimard)
- 1981: Le Lac d'Orta (P.Belfond)
- 1983: Les Serpents (Gallimard "Le Chemin" - rééd. Folio #1704)
- 1984: La Fin du monde (Denoël "L'Infini")
- 1985: Mémoires de Judas (Gallimard "Le Chemin")
- 1987: Sade, Sainte Thérèse (Gallimard "Blanche")
- 1989: L'Empire des livres (Gallimard "Blanche" - rééd. Folio #2319)
- 1993: La Nature du roman (Jean-Jacques Pauvert "Terrain vague")
- 1998: Les Âmes juives (Tristram - rééd. Pocket #10669)
- 1999: Warum (Tristram - rééd. Pocket #11025)
- 2001: L'Éternel mirage (Tristram)
- 2004: Les Comédiens (Tristram)
- 2009: Le Diable (Tristram) Publication posthume
- 2014: Venezia (Tristram) Publication posthume

=== Novel under the name Sabine de Surgis ===
- 1984: La Femme sans visage (Pygmalion Gérard Watelet)

=== Romans noirs ===
- 1986: La Rondelle (Mercure de France, coll. « Crime parfait »)
- 1998: Pitbull (Gallimard, « Série noire » #2481)
- 1999 : Téléphone rose (Gallimard, « Série noire » #2528)
- 2001: En avant les singes ! (suivi de la nouvelle « Cette nuit-là », Gallimard, « Série noire » #2625)
- 2001: Gab save the Di (Baleine, « Le Poulpe »)
- 2004: Crashville (Flammarion)
- 2006: Ramatuelle (Tristram)
- 2008: Ça n'arrive qu'aux mourants (La Branche, « Suite noire » #26)

=== Collections of short stories ===
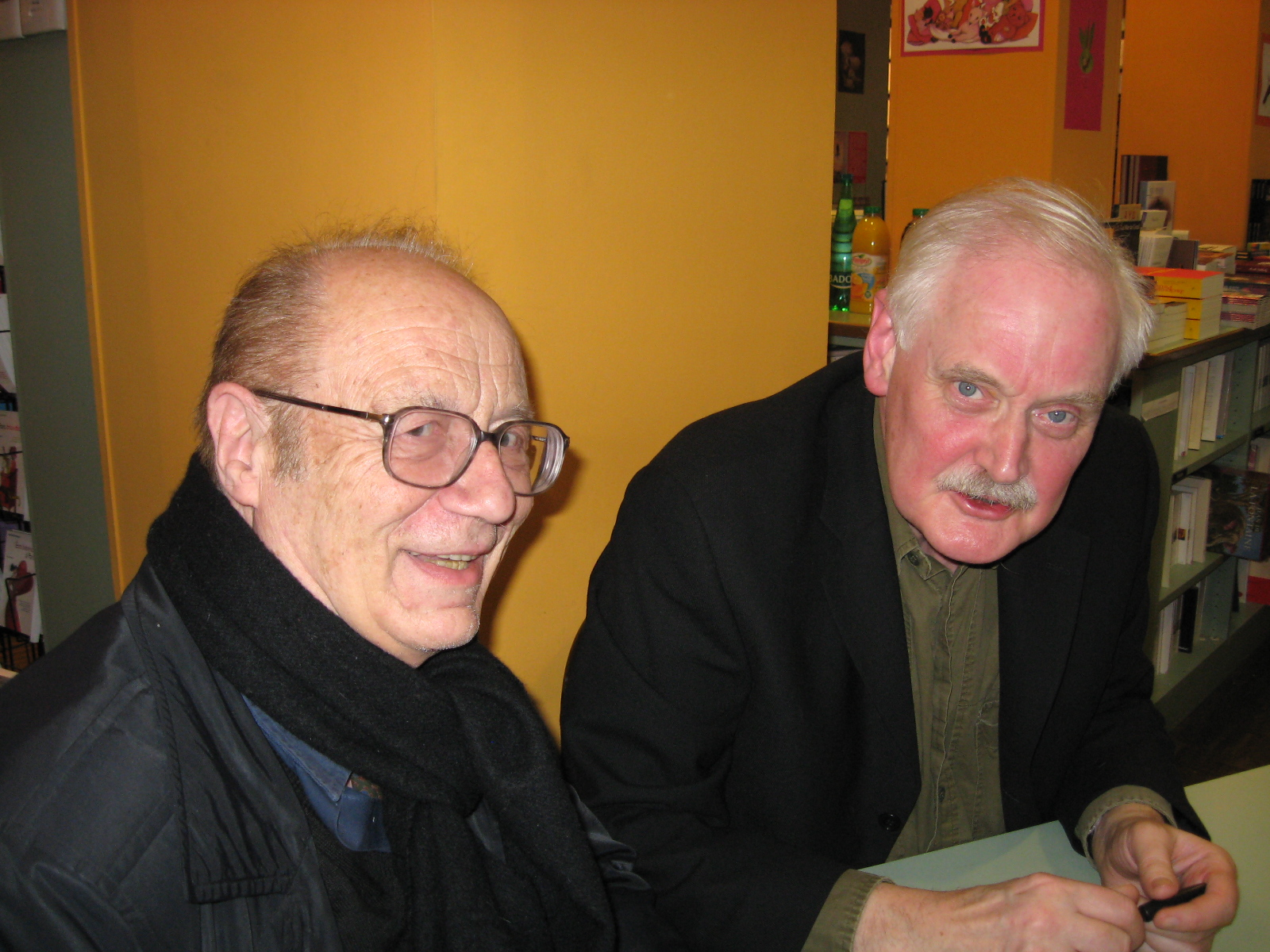
Pierre Bourgeade (left) and Willem en dédicace à la librairie L'Arbre à lettres, January 2008, Paris

- 1966: Les Immortelles (Gallimard "Le Chemin" - rééd. Folio #1168)
- 1995: Éros mécanique (Gallimard "L'Infini" - rééd. Folio #2989)
- 1997: Cybersex et autres nouvelles (Ed. Blanche)
- 1998: L'Argent (Gallimard "L'Infini")
- 2000: L'Autre face, with Marie L. (Arléa)
- 2003: Les Boxeurs (Tristram)
- 2007: Rêves de femmes, ill. by Willem (Tristram)
- 2008: Animamours, ill. by Marie Morel (Éditions HumuS, coll. Eros-Oser) - ISBN 2-940-127-43-3

=== Theatre ===
- 1968: Les Immortelles (Gallimard, series "Le Manteau d'Arlequin"). After the collection of short stories
- 1973: Deutsches Requiem (Gallimard, "Le Manteau d'Arlequin")
- 1975: Orden (Gallimard, "Le Manteau d'Arlequin")
- 1977: Étoiles rouges (L'Avant-scène Théâtre issue 604, 15 February 1977)
- 1980: Le Procès de Charles Baudelaire followed by Palazzo Mentale and Fragments pour Guevara (Jacques-Marie Laffont)
- 1989: Le Camp (Gallimard, "Le Manteau d'Arlequin"). After the novel
- 1995: L'Autorisation (= Le Passeport) (L'Avant-scène Théâtre issue 968, 15 April 1995)
- 1998: Erzébet Bathory (Variable)
- 2002: Berlin 9 novembre (L'Avant-scène Théâtre « Collection des quatre-vents »)
- 2004: Charenton. In Les Comédiens (Tristram)

=== Poetry ===
- 1972 : A. noir, corset velu (photos by Henri Maccheroni from 2000 photographies du sexe d'une femme, portfolio les Mains libres/Jean Petithory)
- 1979 : Hanthologie pour Henri Maccheroni (text on 32 photographs by Henri Maccheroni, Roger Borderie publisher)
- 1984 : Ultimum moriens (dessins de Shirley Carcassonne, series "Deleatur", Dominique Bedou)
- 1995 : Crânes (la Manière noire)
- 2004 : Ô, plein de strideurs étranges (photos by Henri Maccheroni de 2000 photographies du sexe d'une femme, Abstème et Bobance)

=== Essays, conversations ===
- 1971: Violoncelle qui résiste (Le Terrain Vague)
- 1972: Bonsoir, Man Ray (Belfond)
- 1979: La France à l'abattoir (Ramsay)
- 1988: L'Ordre des ténèbres (with Claude Alexandre - Éditions Denoël)
- 1991: Chronique du français quotidien (Belfond)
- 1997: le Mystère Molinier (Pierre Molinier et ses ami(e)s) (voice Richard Meier)
- 1999: Brigitte Lahaie (with Claude Alexandre - La Musardine)
- 2003: L'Objet humain (Gallimard "L'Infini")
- 2003: Le Sang du Toro (with Claude Alexandre - Atlantica)
- 2009: Éloge des fétichistes (Tristram) Posthumous publication

=== Photographs ===
- 2007: Rayographies, text by Jacques Henric, series "Erotica" issue 28 (Chez Higgins) - portfolio faisant suite à l'exposition à la Galerie Christian Arnoux

=== Drawings ===
- 2002: Visite à Sade avec Man Ray et Visite à Pierre Molinier, livres de dessins à tirage limité, galerie Alain Oudin

=== Filmography ===
- 1986: Léon Blum à l'échelle humaine, telefilm
- 2003: L'Écrivain et son chien by Gala Fur and Pierre Bourgeade
- 2005: Médor et Baudelaire by Gala Fur and Pierre Bourgeade

=== Prefaces, postfaces, collaborations ===
- Une forêt de symboles : la poésie. Paris, L'Aventurine - les Éd. du Carrousel, 1999, 650 p. ISBN 2-7456-0066-4. Coll. "Une petite anthologie littéraire". Préf. p. 7-11.
- Alexandre, Claude. Toros. Portfolio. Chez Higgins, coll. "Témoignages", n°13, 2007.
- Alexandre, Claude. Corps sacré (textes et postface - with texs by Catherine Robbe-Grillet, Philippe Sollers, Isaure de Saint-Pierre, Michel Nuridsany, etc.). Ed. E-dite, 2009. ISBN 978-2-846-08276-1
- Autrand, Charles. One way : poèmes. Paris, Librairie Saint-Germain-des-Prés, 1970, 50 p. series "Poètes contemporains". Préf. p. 11-17.
- Blum, Léon. Le Dernier mois. Paris, Arléa, 2000, 95 p. ISBN 2-86959-506-9. Préf. p. 5-9.
- Boisgel, Valérie. De l'aube à la nuit. Paris, Éd. Blanche, 2004, 139 p. series "Bibliothèque Blanche" #32. ISBN 2-84628-076-2. Préf. p. 9-11.
- Boisgel, Valérie. Captive. Paris, Éd. Blanche, 2005, 138 p. series "Bibliothèque Blanche". ISBN 2 84628 112 2. Préf. p. 9 [12]. Réed. J'ai lu, 2008, 93 p. ISBN 978-2-290-01151-5. Préf. p. 7-[9].
- Dax-Boyer, Françoise & Lonsdale, Michael. L'Éden avant après. Paris, l'Amandier, 2008, 47 p. Coll. "Le Voir Dit". ISBN 978-2 35516-053-0. Préf. p. 9.
- Debaille, Lucile. La Petite musique d'Éros. Paris, Ornicar, 2000. ISBN 2-913888-07-0. Rééd. le Cercle, 2003, 151 p. Coll. "Le Cercle Poche" n° 36. ISBN 2-913563-75-9. Préf. p. 7 8.
- Foucault, Annick. Françoise maîtresse : récit. Paris, Gallimard, 1994, 188 p. Coll. "Digraphe". ISBN 2-07-073834-5. Préf. p. VII-[IX].
- France, Anatole. L'île des pingouins. Paris, Messidor, 1990, 380 p. Coll. "Les Grands romans de la liberté" n° 7. ISBN 978-2-209-06309-3. Préf. p. 11–17.
- Fur, Gala. Séances. Paris, la Musardine, 2002, 140 p. ISBN 2 84271-169-6. Préf. p. 7-[10]. Rééd. la Musardine, 2006, 157 p. ISBN 2-84271-305-2. Coll. « Lectures amoureuses de Jean-Jacques Pauvert » n° 93. Préf. p. 7-[10].
- Gassel, Nathalie. Éros androgyne : journal d'une femme athlétique. Namur, Éd. de l'Acanthe, 2000, 104 p. Coll. "L'Instant". ISBN 2 930219 47 5. Préf. p. [9] 11. Rééd. le Cercle, 2001, 92 p. Coll. "Le Cercle Poche" n° 20. ISBN 2 913563-37-6. Préf. p. 5-8.
- Henric, Jacques & Amat, Jorge. Obsessions nocturnes. Paris, E-dite, 2006, 121 p. ISBN 2-84608-194-8. Préf. p. 9-12.
- Holtrop, Medi. Plaisir. Rieux-Volvestre, Orbis Pictus Club, 2008, [152] p. ISBN 978-2-913063-29-7. Préf. p. [3-9].
- Ionesco, Irina. Cent photos érotiques. Nyons, Éd. Roger Borderie, 1982, 110 p. Coll. "Images Obliques".
- Ionesco, Irina. Cent onze photographies érotiques. Nyons, Éd. Roger Borderie, 1981, 111 p. Coll. "Images Obliques" n° 6. ISBN 2-8638-0011-6
- Ionesco, Irina. Le Divan, portfolio. Nyons, Éd. Roger Borderie, 1981, 8 p.-12 f. de pl. Préf. p. 3-7.
- Ionesco, Irina. Passions. Paris : Pink Star éd.; Nyons : Le Club de livre secret, 1984, 78 p. ISBN 2-90390105-8. Préf. p. 4-5, 6–7.
- Klasen, Peter. Peter Klasen : oxidezing agent : tableaux objets choisis = chosen paintings objects : 1960 1990, catalogue d'exposition. Paris, Galerie Louis Carré & Cie - Galerie Enrico Navarra, 1991, 96 p. Préf. p. 7.
- Kuniyoshi, Kaneko. Les Jeux, nouvelle illustrée par l'auteur, traduite du japonais par Pierre Bourgeade. Coéd. Shinchosha (Tokyo) et Galerie À l'Enseigne des Oudin (Paris), 1997, 100 p.
- L., Marie. Confessée. Castelnau le Lez, Climats, 1996, 157 p. Coll. "Arc en ciel". ISBN 2-841-58045-8. Rééd. la Musardine, 2000, 158 p. Coll. "Lectures amoureuses de Jean Jacques Pauvert" n° 34. ISBN 2-8427-1055-X. Préf. p. 5-12.
- L., Marie. Noli me tangere : ne me touche pas. Paris, la Musardine, 2001, 87 p. Coll. "Carmina". ISBN 2 84271-122-X
- Le Sage, Patrick. Journal d'un maître. Paris, Flammarion, 2005, 279 p. Coll. "Grands conflits du XX° siècle". ISBN 2-08-068620-8. Préf. p. 9-[19].
- Lévy-Kuentz, Stéphan. Sur le football. Paris, Méréal, 1998, 66 p. Coll. "Citoyenne". ISBN 2-909310-73-6. Préf. p. 9-11.
- Lévy-Kuentz, Stéphan. Tu me fais mal avec ton coude. Monaco, Éd. du Rocher, 2006, 92 p. ISBN 2-268-05922-7. Préf. p. 9-[10].
- Maccheroni, Henri. Un après midi chez Pierre Molinier. Bordeaux, Opales-Pleine page éditeurs, 2005, 45 p. Préf. p. 7-11.
- Marc, Alain. Écrire le cri. Orléans, l'Écarlate, 2000, 182 p. Préf. p. [VII]-XI. ISBN 2-910142-04-3
- Menchior, Rachel. Dessins érotiques de Menchior. Paris, Éd. Éric Losfeld, 1971, 150 p.
- Molinier, Pierre. Cent photographies érotiques. Nyons, Éd. Roger Borderie et Michel Camus, 1979, 112 p. Coll. "Images obliques" n° 4. Préf. p. 9-15.
- Rimbaud, Arthur. Les Vingt plus beaux poèmes. Paris, Librairie Gibert Joseph, 1991, 82 p. Coll. "La Substantifique moelle". ISBN 2-908959-12-7. Préf. p. 7-8.
- Ray, Man. Bonsoir, Man Ray. Paris, Maeght, 2002, 131 p. Coll. "Chroniques anachroniques". ISBN 2-86941-301-7. Préf. p. 7-11.
- Siméon, Jean-Pierre. Matière nuit. Bordeaux, le Castor Astral, 1997, 68 p. Coll. "Littératures". ISBN 2-85920-296-X. Préf. p. [9]-11.

=== Publications en revues ===
Poetry

- « Grand ciel de mots, Sade en automne », revue Digraphe, republié en ligne sur Inventaire-Invention

Narratives

- « Chimène chez Lipp », Les Lettres Françaises issue 58, April 2009 Read online

Articles

- Récit « Bourgeade rencontre Genet », revue Variable19; republié par et pour Les Lettres Françaises sur le site de L'Humanité
- Article sur la revue L'Humidité (dir. Jean-François Bory) and Michel Journiac, Les Lettres Françaises, June 2008 read on line
- « Joyce and Joyce », la Quinzaine littéraire, 15-31 janv. 1967.
- Chroniques « Bloc-notes », la Revue littéraire issues 1 to 7, Léo Scheer, avr. à oct. 2004 et issue 10, January 2005

== On Pierre Bourgeade ==
Articles biographiques

- « Pierre Bourgeade ». In Cousin, Philippe (2000). L'encyclopédie du sadomasochisme (in French). Paris: la Musardine. pp. 53–55. ISBN 2-842-71088-6.
- « Bourgeade (Pierre, Eugène, Henri) ». In Who's Who in France : dictionnaire biographique 2001-2002, 33rd éd. Levallois-Perret, Éd. Jacques Lafitte, October 2001, p. 333. ISBN 2-85784-040-3
- « Bourgeade (Pierre, Eugène, Henri) ». In Who's Who in France; dictionnaire biographique 2004-2005 (in French). Paris Levallois-Perret: Ed. J. Lafitte. 2001. p. 346. ISBN 2-857-84040-3.
- Balazard, Simone. « Bourgeade Pierre ». In Le Guide du théâtre français contemporain. Paris, Syros alternatives, décembre 1988, p. 141. Coll. "Les Guides culturels Syros". ISBN 2-86738-335-8
- Bourgeade, Pierre. « Bourgeade, Pierre ». In Garcin, Jérôme (dir.). Le Dictionnaire : littérature française contemporaine. Paris, Françoise Bourin, December 1988, p. 75-78. ISBN 2-87686-021-X
- Bourgeade, Pierre. « Bourgeade, Pierre ». In Garcin, Jérôme (dir.). Dictionnaire des écrivains contemporains de langue française par eux-mêmes. Paris, Mille et une nuits, March 2004, p. 64-66. Notice rédigée en 1988 et revue en 2003. ISBN 2-84205-742-2
- Cartano, Tony. « Pierre Bourgeade ». In Bonnefoy Claude, Cartano Tony, Oster Daniel (éd.). Dictionnaire de littérature française contemporaine. Paris, Éd. Jean-Pierre Delarge, September 1977, p. 72-73. ISBN 2-7113-0077-3
- Confortès, Claude. « Pierre Bourgeade ». In Confortès, Claude. Répertoire du théâtre contemporain de langue française. Paris, F. Nathan, September 2002, p. 63. ISBN 2-09-190192-X
- Damour, Jean-Pierre. « Bourgeade, Pierre ». In Beaumarchais Jean-Pierre, Couty Daniel, Rey Alain (dir.). Dictionnaire des littératures de langue française, vol. 1 (A-L). Paris, Larousse, octobre 2001, p. 242-243. ISBN 2-03-505173-8
- David, Jean-Marie. « Bourgeade, Pierre ». In Claude Mesplède [in French] (2007). Dictionnaire des littératures policières. Temps noir (in French). Vol. 1. Nantes: Joseph K. pp. 276–277. ISBN 978-2-910-68644-4. OCLC 315873251..
- Dumougin, Jacques. « Bourgeade, Pierre ». In Dumougin, Jacques (dir.). Dictionnaire de la littérature française et francophone, volume 1 (A-Eekhoud). Paris, Larousse, October 1987, p. 225. series "Références". ISBN 2-03-720021-8
- Dumougin, Jacques. « Bourgeade, Pierre ». In Dumougin, Jacques (dir.). Dictionnaire historique, thématique et technique des littératures française et étrangères, anciennes et modernes, vol. 1. Paris, Larousse, septembre 1985, p. 229. Réimpr. 12/1989. ISBN 2-03-508301-X
- Morelle, Paul. « Pierre Bourgeade ». Littérature de notre temps, recueil V. Paris, Casterman, 1974, p. 33-35
- Piatier, Jacqueline. « Bourgeade, Pierre ». In Beaumarchais Jean-Pierre, Couty Daniel, Rey Alain (dir.). Dictionnaire des littératures de langue française, tome A-D. Paris, Bordas, May 1988, p. 320-321. Rééd. : 03/1994, p. 319-320. ISBN 2-04-027031-0. Reprise in L'Avant-scène Théâtre, 15 April 1995, issue 968, p. 29-30. ISSN 0045-1169
- Poirier, Jacques. « Bourgeade Pierre ». In Grente Georges (dir.). Dictionnaire des lettres françaises, volume 6 : le XX, éd. réal. under the leadership of Martine Bercot and André Guyaux. Paris, Librairie Générale Française, May 1998, p. 175. Series "La Pochothèque. Encyclopédies aujourd'hui" #3109. ISBN 2-253-13109-1
- Schmitt, Michel P., « Bourgeade Pierre - (1927-2009) », Encyclopædia Universalis [online], consulté le 20 août 2014.
- Tulard, Jean. « Bourgeade Pierre ». Dictionnaire du roman policier : 1841-2005. Paris, Librairie Arthème-Fayard, September 2005, p. 92. ISBN 2-213-62590-5

Magazine issues

- « Hommage à Pierre Bourgeade » (by Edmonde Charles-Roux, Franck Delorieux, Jean-Michel Devésa, François Eychard, Jean-Hubert Gailliot, Gabriel Matzneff, Jean Ristat, Jean-Pierre Siméon and François Weyergans), Les Lettres Françaises issue 58, April 2009 read online

Articles généraux

- Marc, Alain. « Le Corps caché de Pierre Bourgeade », revue de littératures Contre-Vox issue 7 « Odyssée Corps 2000 », January 2000, p. 72-75
- Ristat, Jean, « Mon ami, Pierre Bourgeade », Les Lettres Françaises issue 58, avril 2009 read online (see Numéro de revue)
- Streiff, Gérard. « Pierre Bourgeade : le Racine de l'érotisme ». Parutions Baleine janvier-février-mars 2001. Paris, Baleine, 2000, p. 25. ISBN 2-84219-333-4
- Weyergans, François, Les livres ne sont pas des cercueils, les Lettres françaises issue 58, April 2009 read online (see Numéro de revue)

Articles critiques

- Banse, Sébastien, que je voie qui est vivant et qui est mort. (sur le roman Le Diable), les Lettres françaises read online
- Ristat, Jean, « La Passion à Venise » (sur le roman Venezia), les Lettres françaises issue 118, September 2014 read online

Articles online

- Bourgeade, Pierre, « Pierre Bourgeade par lui-même », republished by le Nouvel observateur
- Jacob, Didier, « Pierre Bourgeade (1927-2009) », blog Rebuts de presse
- Gilles Heuré, L'armoire à tiroirs de Pierre Bourgeade, l'Humanité
