= Sans aucun doute =

- Genre: Magazine
- Presented by: Julien Courbet (1994–2008, 2013–2014), Christophe Moulin (2008–2009)
- Country of origin: France
- Original language: French
- No. of seasons: 16

Production
- Running time: 2 hours
- Production company: Quai Sud Télévisions (bought by TF1 in 2005)

Original release
- Network: TMC (2013–2014) TF1 (1994–2009)
- Release: 7 September 1994 – 30 May 2014

Sans aucun doute ("Without a Doubt") is a French television show, premiering on 7 September 1994 and presented by Julien Courbet until 30 May 2008 then by Christophe Moulin from 12 September 2008 to 18 December 2009. Produced by Quai Sud Télévisions, since September 2013 is shown daily by TMC in the early evening. The presenter's mission is to help out viewers confronted with major consumer problems or with neighbours, with the help of a team of mediators, lawyers and on the spot journalists.

== Format ==
The show is made up of two main parts for each problem that is treated: a reportage outlining the problem with the help of reconstructions, confrontations between the protagonists using hidden cameras, different elements of proof etc. During the second part, the presenter attempts to contact the defendants by telephone with the participation of the lawyers, negotiators and other experts, and tries amicable negotiation with them in order to find a satisfactory solution, which often leads to heated discussions. The investigation therefore often follows with telephone calls to the victim's or adversary's family, witnesses and other victims, in order to gather the most evidence which are useful to challenge the "good faith" in which most of the "confidence tricksters" pretend to have acted. Once the situation is truly insoluble, or the incriminated party does not answer the telephone, the journalists attempt to contact them at their home or work in order to attempt negotiation between the two parties. In the rare cases where the affair cannot be settled immediately, the victim is invited to return to the show once the problem is finally resolved.

== Special dossiers ==
Each summer, from 2006 to 2008, TF1 broadcast the "best of" the show in Les dossiers de Sans aucun doute. These special thematic episodes were shown each Friday. These dossiers were cancelled in 2009.

== Spin-offs ==
The success of the show resulted in spin-offs in different formats:

- Les 7 Péchés Capitaux (The 7 sins);
- Les Voisins : Vont-ils se mettre d'accord ? (The neighbours: will they come to an agreement?), 45-minute show broadcast periodically early evening devoted to one sole case of problems often very sensitive between neighbours;
- Le Grand Frère (the Big Brother), 45-minute show broadcast, and Les Voisins (the Neighbours), where a social centre worker, upon request by the parents, to attempt to put their children back on "the right track". These two shows are produced by the "La Concepteria", Julien Courbet's production company;
- La Grande Soirée Anti-Arnaque (The big anti-scam night), formatted along the lines of a game show where the public helped by stars have to reply correctly to many series of 4 on a particular consumer subject. Reportages concerning the scandals associated with the themes covered intersperse the show where a team of lawyers give details about law to the viewers;
- Voisins, vont ils se mettre d 'accord (Neighbours, will they agree) the show broadcast during primetime in January 2006 was watched by more than 7 million viewers, and came back in March to 6 million, not enough at the time for the broadcaster. Now the "neighbour" reportages and mediations are integrated into Sans aucun doute, with the journalist Hervé Pouchol.

The same show is broadcast on RTL from Monday to Friday from 9:30 to 11:30 under the name Ça peut vous arriver (That can happen to you).

There is also a weekly magazine "Stop Arnaques" (Stop scams) and the editor-in-chief is one of the show's team of lawyers, and a series of books, "Stop aux Arnaques" (Stop the scams), each dedicated to a particular theme. The two publications are intended to help people in difficulty to resolve their problems and inform them of their rights.

== Team ==
The show uses many lawyers and journalists as experts in the affairs handled on set. With the arrival of Christophe Moulin, almost all of the team of lawyers, mediators and experts were replaced.

- During September 1994 – June 2008:
  - Maître Didier Bergès
  - Maître Eric de Caumont, specialist in the automobile industry
  - Doctor Dominique Courtois, medical consultant
  - Maître Nathalie Fellonneau, lawyer
  - Maître Caroline Guesdj, lawyer
  - Maître Gérard Michel, lawyer at the Bar association of Nancy
  - Maître Sylvie Noachovitch, criminal lawyer who left the show in April 2007 to pursue her political career
  - Maître Marilyne Olivié, who replaced Sylvie Noachovitch
  - Hervé Pouchol, mediator (also worked on Les 7 Péchés Capitaux)
  - Bernard Sabbat, consultant
  - Loïc Scornec, specialist in harassment
  - Timothée Vienne, journalist
- From September 2008 to date:
  - Ève Bartoli, journalist
  - Maître Jean-Philippe Coin
  - Doctor Dominique Courtois, medical consultant
  - Maître Sabine Cordesse, lawyer
  - Maître Denis Del-Rio, lawyer
  - Joseph Elmaleh, mediator
  - Maître Gérard Haas, lawyer
  - Sandrine Pégand, lawyer
  - Hervé Pouchol, mediator in neighbour conflicts
  - Maître Isabelle Steyer, lawyer

== Viewer numbers ==
Sans aucun doute was once one of the regular shows which had the largest share of the French television market, with between 40 and 55%, because of the length of the programme (2 hours 30 minutes). The number of viewers was around 2 million. Since 2007, the market share has greatly dropped to less than 30%.

The first broadcast of the 2008 season with Christophe Moulin, on Friday 12 September 2008, was watched by 1.47 million viewers for a market share of 32.2%. This is considered a reasonable figure given the erosion of television channels with the arrival of TNT. The audience has remained stable since at around 35%. In February 2008 Sans aucun doute broadcast its 500th show.

== Broadcasts ==
Sans aucun doute has been broadcast since 7 September 1994; initially during the second part of every Wednesday evening (September 1994 – September 1996), and since September 1995 the second part of every Friday evening.
