= Pierre Loeb =

French gallery owner and art dealer (1897–1964)

- Born: 24 September 1897; Paris, France
- Died: 4 May 1964 (aged 66)
- Occupations: Art dealer and gallery owner
- Relatives: Denise Colomb (sister)

Pierre Loeb (24 September 1897 – 4 May 1964) was a French art dealer and gallery owner who focused primarily on Surrealism and 20th-century Modernism. In 1924, he founded the Galerie Pierre in Paris, whose most famous exhibition was the first collective exhibition of Surrealists the following year.

== Life ==
Born in Paris, France, Pierre Loeb worked in his father's rope-making business. He met the dentist Daniel Tzanck, an art collector who introduced him to modern art. Tsanck was friends with the Bulgarian painter Jules Pascin as well as the French painter André Derain. In 1924, Loeb opened his Galerie Pierre at 13 rue Bonaparte in Paris and presented Pascin's works in his first exhibition. In the gallery's most famous exhibition, La peinture surréaliste (November 14–26, 1925), the first group exhibition of Surrealist painters, Loeb presented works by Hans Arp, Paul Klee, Man Ray, Max Ernst, Pablo Picasso, Joan Miró, Giorgio de Chirico, as well as André Masson.

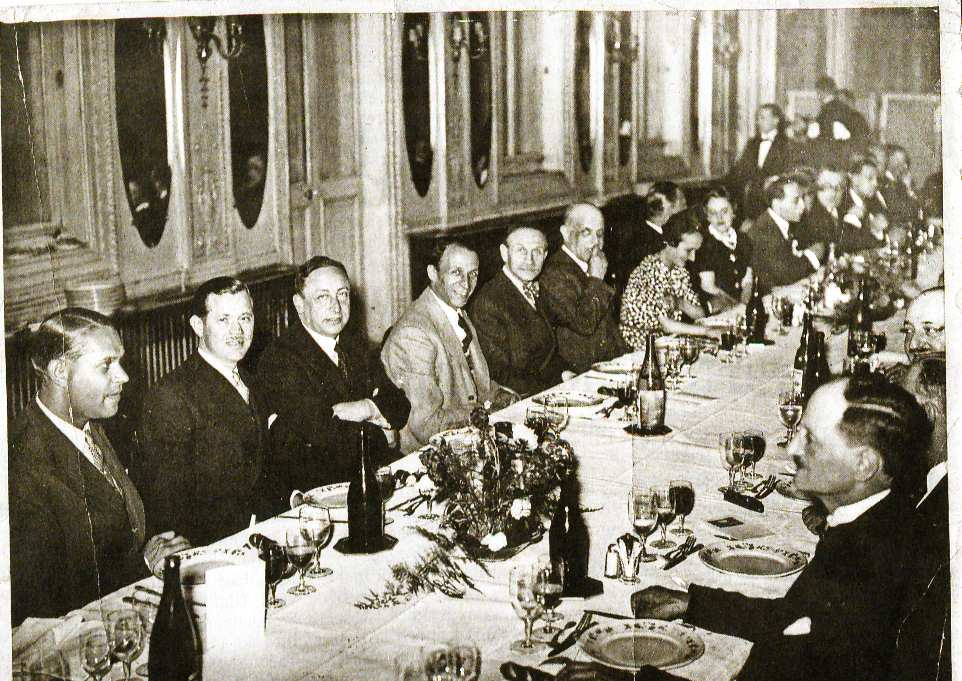
Loeb (4th from left) among colleagues (1938)

In 1926, he moved the gallery to number 2, Rue des Beaux-Arts. In the same year, Loeb met for the first time in person with Pablo Picasso, with whom he later became good friends and whose works he exhibited in 1929. He was also a great follower of Joan Miró, whose works he exhibited eleven times from 1927 to 1939. In 1930 Loeb showed sculptures by Henri Matisse, in 1934 the gallery hosted the first exhibition of the artist Balthus and in 1936 the first solo exhibition of Wolfgang Paalen. In 1938 he focused on the landscape paintings of Georges Braque.

== Nazi persecution and exile ==
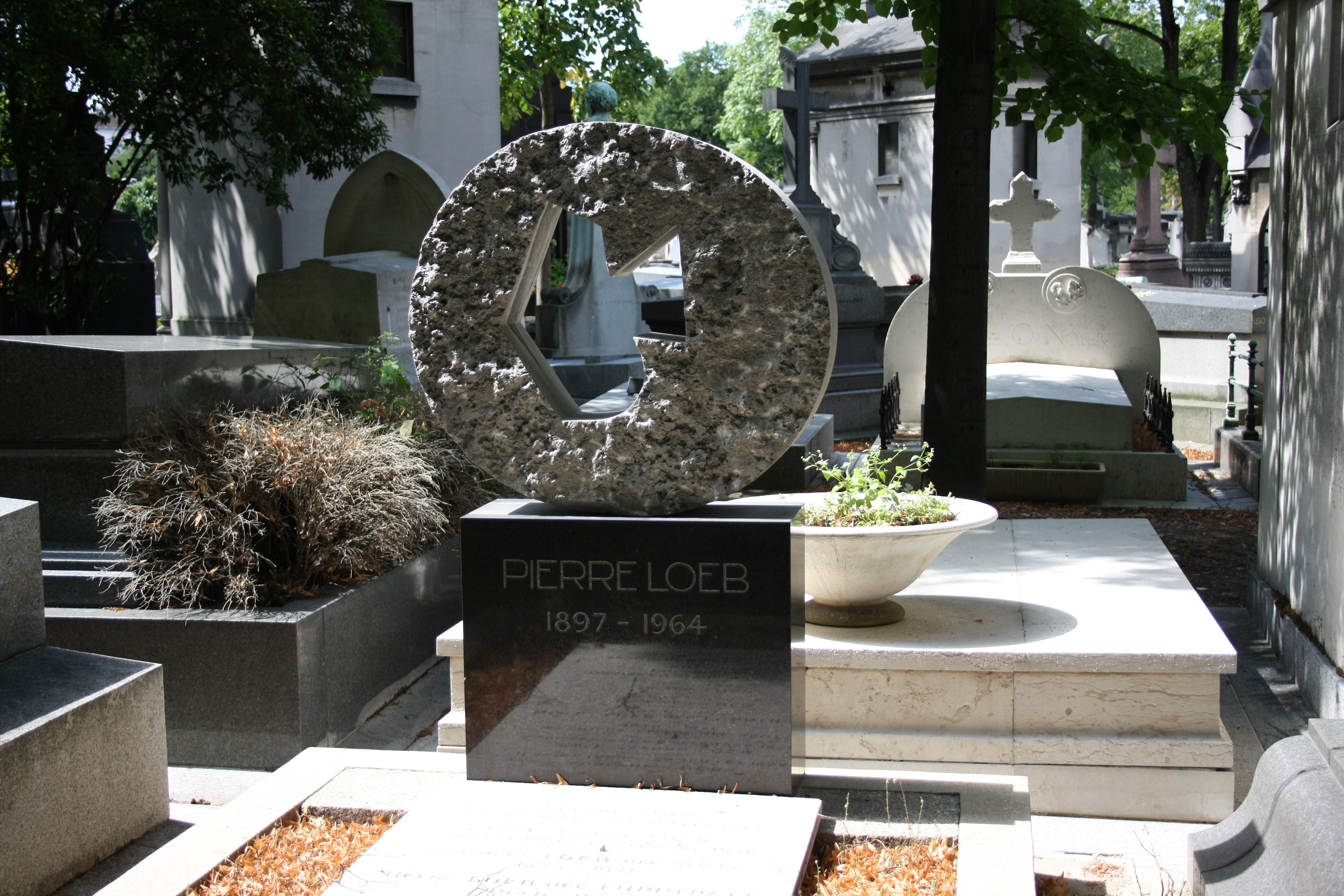
Loeb's grave at Montparnasse cemetery in Paris with the sculpture La Roue by Hans Arp

When the Nazis occupied Paris in 1940, Loeb was persecuted because of his Jewish heritage. His art gallery was Aryanized, that is, transferred to a non-Jewish owner, Georges Aubry, in 1941. In 1942 he fled to Cuba, where he lived until the end of the war.

== Postwar ==
After the end of the war, Loeb returned to Paris and recovered his gallery, though not without difficulty. He organized a sensational exhibition of drawings by Antonin Artaud (1947). After that, he focused with great energy on abstract painting, exhibiting works by the artist group CoBrA and the École de Paris, as well as by individual artists such as Maria Helena Vieira da Silva, Zao Wou-Ki, Constantin Georges Macris, and Camille Bryen.

In 1957, he married Agathe Vaito.

In 1964, Pierre Loeb died, acknowledged as one of the most famous art dealers and gallery owners of modernism. He rests in the Cimetière Montparnasse (28th Division). His grave is adorned with a granite sculpture entitled La Roue (The Wheel) by Hans Arp, from 1965.

== Family ==
Pierre Loeb was the brother of photographer Denise Colomb (1902–2004). His son Albert Loeb (b. 1932) owned a gallery in New York City from 1958 to 1971 and opened a gallery in 1966 until February 2015 existing gallery in Paris. Pierre Loeb's grandchildren are the chanson singer, actress and director Caroline Loeb (* 1955) and the actor Martin Loeb (* 1959).
