= Daniel Smith (philosopher) =

American philosopher and academic

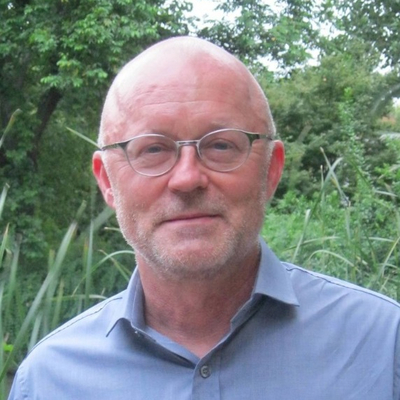
- Born: Daniel W. Smith; October 26, 1958 (age 67)
- Occupations: Philosopher, academic

Academic background
- Education: Wheaton College; University of Chicago

Daniel W. Smith (born October 26, 1958) is an American philosopher, academic, researcher, and translator. He is a professor in the Department of Philosophy at Purdue University, where he specializes in 19th and 20th century continental philosophy. He serves as the co-director of the Deleuze Seminars project.

== Education ==
Daniel Smith earned his Ph.D. in Philosophy from the University of Chicago in 1997. He previously obtained an M.A. in Religious Studies from the same institution in 1983 and a B.A. in Literature from Wheaton College in Illinois. Additionally, he has studied languages at Paris IV and Beijing Language and Culture University.

== Career ==
Smith worked as an assistant professor at Grinnell College for the 1997-1998 academic year and was a Vice-Chancellor's Postdoctoral Fellow at the University of New South Wales in Australia from 1999 to 2001. He joined the faculty at Purdue University in 2001, where he was promoted to Associate Professor in 2005 and became a Professor of Philosophy in 2014. At Purdue, he holds positions in the Department of Philosophy, the Program in Religious Studies, and the interdisciplinary program in Philosophy and Literature.

Smith is recognized for his interpretations of the work of French philosopher Gilles Deleuze (1925-1995) and is the author of Essays on Deleuze, which has been translated into several languages, including Turkish, Slovenian, Spanish, Estonian, and Japanese. He has also translated works by Gilles Deleuze, Michel Foucault, Pierre Klossowski, Michel Serres, and Isabelle Stengers into English. Since 2019, he has been the Director of the interdisciplinary program in Philosophy and Literature at Purdue University.

== Research ==
Smith's research primarily focuses on 19th and 20th-century European philosophy. His areas of expertise include aesthetics, phenomenology, and the works of philosophers such as Nietzsche, Kant, Spinoza, and Bergson, as well as social and political philosophy and the philosophy of technology. He authored one of the early theses on Deleuze's philosophy and translated two of Deleuze's works into English: "Francis Bacon: The Logic of Sensations" and Essays Critical and Clinical."

- The Concept of the Simulacrum: Deleuze and the Overturning of Platonism - 2005 - Continental Philosophy.
- Deleuze and the Question of Desire: Toward an Immanent Theory of Ethics - 2007 - Parrhesia.
- The Pure and Empty Form of Time: Deleuze’s Theory of Temporality - 2023 - In Daniel W. Smith & Robert Luzecky, Deleuze and Time.
- Deleuze’s Theory of Sensation: Overcoming the Kantian Duality.
