= Pierre Mertens =

Belgian-French writer and lawyer (1939–2025)

- Born: 9 October 1939; Boitsfort, Belgium
- Died: 19 January 2025 (aged 85)
- Occupations: Lawyer, writer

Pierre Mertens (9 October 1939 – 19 January 2025) was a Belgian writer and lawyer who specialised in international law, director of the Centre de sociologie de la littérature at the Université libre de Bruxelles, and literary critic with the newspaper Le Soir.

== Life and career ==
Influenced by Franz Kafka, Mertens started to publish novels and short stories in 1969 and received the Prix Médicis in 1987 for Les éblouissements. He nevertheless continued his activities as a lawyer, participating in many battles for human rights. In 1989, he entered the Académie royale de langue et littérature de Belgique, and was also named Chevalier de l'Ordre des Arts et des Lettres by France.

Mertens reflected much on the social function of the writer. For him, private life, fiction, and history were inseparable. Thus he granted a central place to the memory in the creation of his works. To him the novelist finds his inspiration in their personal and the historical past. Mertens was particularly marked by the activities of his parents, his father a journalist and music lover and his mother a biologist and pianist. He was also much affected by the German occupation, the execution of the Rosenbergs and the tragedy of the miners of Marcinelle in 1956. Later as a scholar of international law he denounced the genocide in Biafra, torture in Ireland, and the prisons of Pinochet.

Another important inspiration was music. In his novels, one finds the influence of music, such as the leitmotifs which cross them (the figure of the tiger, for example). His musical references were firmly anchored in the works of Schubert, Alban Berg, Bartók and many others. He was also the author of an opera libretto, La passion de Gilles (1982), set to music by Philippe Boesmans.

His travels and his extensive education gave him an international perspective. In Les Bons offices (1974) and Terre d'asile (1978) Belgian history is presented from a foreign perspective. Mertens often saw his country as a synthesis of Europe and its problems.

He caused controversy in his homeland with his book Une paix royale, published in 1995, which tells a fictionalised story of Belgium's royal family, mixing fiction and reality. He was tried and forced to remove a couple of pages from the subsequent editions.

Mertens died on 19 January 2025, at the age of 85.

== Works ==
- L'Afrique de Pékin Preface by Paul-Henri Spaak, 1966.
- L'Inde ou l'Amérique Preface by Pierre Gascar, Editions du Seuil, Prix Rossel– 1969
- Le Niveau de la mer Editions l'Age d'Homme – 1970
- La Fête des anciens Editions du Seuil, Bourse de la Fondation Cino del Duca (1973) – 1971

New Edition "Editions Les Eperonniers," Collection "Passé-Présent" with a preface by Daniel Oster

- L'Imprescriptibilité des crimes de guerre et contre l'humanité Editions de l'Université de Bruxelles – 1974
- Les Bons offices Editions du Seuil – 1974, Prix Belgo-canadien 1975

New edition "Talus d'Approche" 1994 with a preface by Régis Debray.

- Nécrologies Editions J. Antoine – 1977
- Terre d'asile – Grasset, 1978, Prix de la Communauté française de Belgique.

New Edition Labor-Actes Sud, collection Babel, with a preface by Michel del Castillo, 1989.

- Terreurs Editions Le Talus d'Approche – 1984
- Perdre A. Fayard – 1984
- Berlin – 1986
- Les éblouissements Editions du Seuil, collection "Fiction et Cie" – 1987

Prix Médicis 1987 et Prix Europe-Strasbourg 1987. Prix Bernheim 1987, Ruban de la Francophonie 1988, Prix Paul Celan 1989.

- Uwe Johnson, le scripteur de murs Actes Sud – 1989
- L'Agent double – 1989
- Lettres clandestines Editions du Seuil, collection "Fiction et Cie"– 1990
- Les Chutes centrales Verdier – 1990
- Les Phoques de San FranciscoEditions du Seuil, collection "Fiction et Cie" – 1991

Prix de la Nouvelle de l'Academie française.

- Flammes Editions Actes Sud/Papiers– 1993
- Une paix royale Editions du Seuil, collection "Fiction et Cie" – 1995
- Collision et autres nouvelles – 1995
- Tout est feu – 1999
- Perasma – 2001
- Rilke ou l'ange déchiré – 2001
- Écrire après Auschwitz? – 2003
- La violence et l’amnésie – 2004
- Paysage Sans Véronique Les Impressions Nouvelles – 2025
