= Christophe Moulin (television presenter) =

French television presenter (born 1967)

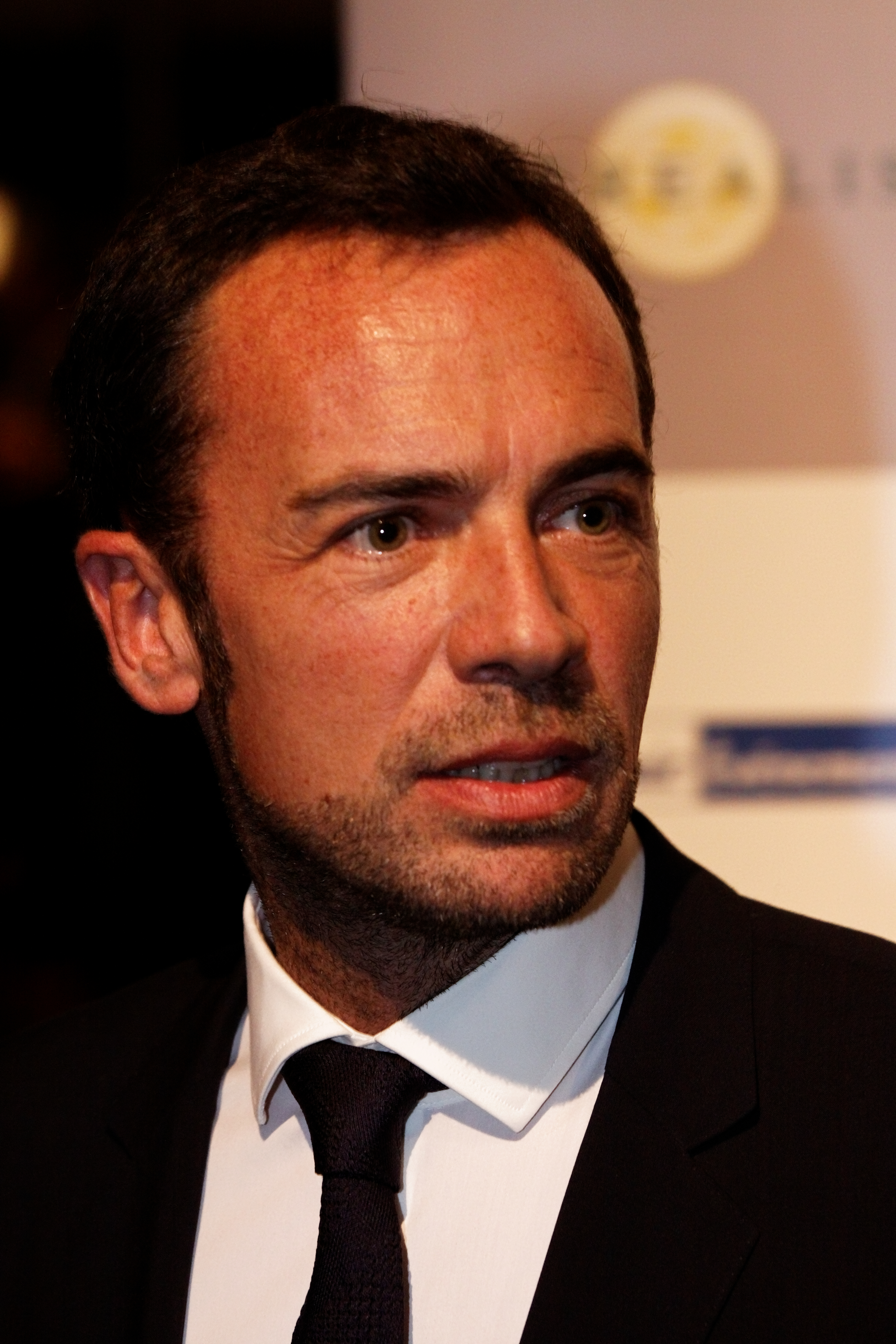
- Moulin in January 2012
- Born: Christophe Moulin; 7 February 1967
- Occupation: Television presenter
- Employer: TF1

Christophe Moulin, born 1967 is a French television presenter. He presents Sans aucun doute by TF1, having taken over from Julien Courbet on 12 September 2008. He was previously a journalist and editor-in-chief with LCI, as well as the head of the Police and Justice department of LCI. He started working at LCI in 1994. He presented two weekly shows: one legal "Preuves à l'appui" and one political "Politoscopie". A graduate of the École supérieure de journalisme, he also worked for the TPS Star and 13ème rue television stations, as well as for Radio France.
