= Simon Liberati =

French writer and journalist

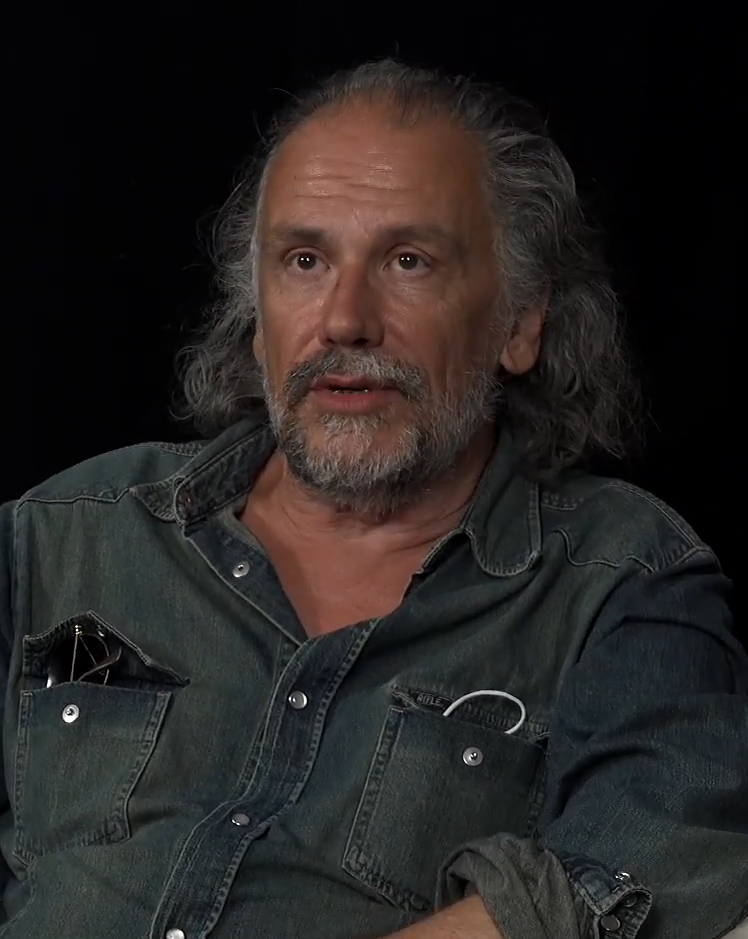
- Liberati in 2020
- Born: 12 May 1960 (age 66); Paris, France
- Citizenship: France
- Education: Collège Stanislas de Paris
- Alma mater: Sorbonne
- Occupations: Writer; journalist
- Spouse: Eva Ionesco (m. 2013)
- Relatives: André Liberati (father)
- Writing career
- Language: French
- Notable awards: Prix de Flore (2009); Prix Femina (2011); Prix Renaudot (2022)

Simon Liberati (born 12 May 1960) is a French writer and journalist. For his novels, he has received the Prix de Flore (2009), Prix Femina (2011) and Prix Renaudot (2022).

== Biography ==
Liberati was born in Paris. After studying Latin grammar at the Sorbonne, he became a journalist, among others for FHM, Grazia and 20 Ans where he was responsible (among other things) of the horoscope heading. Subsequently, he devoted himself to writing.

In 2004, Frédéric Beigbeder, then an editor at Flammarion, published his first novel, Anthologie des apparitions, on the theme of adolescence, which enjoyed a positive critical reception.

In 2007 he published the novel Nada exist in which he painted the portrait of a fashion photographer who slides from glitter and celebrity to dereliction.

In 2008, Simon Liberati and Frédéric Beigbeder were arrested by the police and placed in police custody for drug use on the public thoroughfare. This episode is at the origin of A French Novel, published in 2009 by Frédéric Beigbeder in which Simon Liberati appears in the guise of a character called "the poet".

In 2008, he wrote the preface to On Dandyism and George Brummell by Jules Barbey d'Aurevilly, published by éditions de Paris and took part to the collection 10 ans, 10 auteurs, 10 nouvelles, published by J'ai lu, in the collection "Nouvelle génération" and La Revue littéraire (éditions Léo Scheer, n° 34/35), in which he published a literary critic titled "À propos des Bienveillantes".

His third work entitled L' Hyper Justine received the prix de Flore 2009 whose jury was chaired by Frédéric Beigbeder, a friend and editor of the author's first novel. These bonds were noted by some media.

In 2011, éditions Grasset published his fourth novel, Jayne Mansfield 1967, in the series "Ceci n'est pas un fait divers", a narrative in which he retraced the tragic destiny of the actress. The book was rewarded by the prix Femina on 7 November 2011. Jayne Mansfield sold 35,000 copies, a number judged "disappointing" by the publisher itself; A text rewarded by the Feminina sells on average 155,000 copies Simon Liberati declared that if his first novel had sold well (around 20,000 copies), others had barely reached the 3,000 mark.

In January 2013 Flammarion published his 113 études de littérature romantique, a book, according to the site evene.fr, "Thick, a little messy, at once naive and sincere, with passages that are forgotten but also moments of grace". and which proposes to the reader to discover the readings that have built Simon Liberati. The book enjoyed a positive reception.

On 3 November 2022, his novel Performance was awarded the Prix Renaudot.

== Personal life ==
Simon Liberati has been married to actress and film director Eva Ionesco since 8 December 2013.

== Work ==
=== Literature ===
- 2004: Anthologie des apparitions, Flammarion
- 2007: Nada exist, Flammarion
- 2009: L'Hyper Justine, Flammarion
- 2011: Jayne Mansfield 1967, Grasset, Prix Fémina
- 2013: 113 études de littérature romantique, Flammarion
- 2015: Eva, Stock.
- 2016: California girls, Grasset
- 2017: Les Rameaux noirs, Stock, collection La Bleue
- 2017: Les Violettes de l'avenue Foch, Stock, collection La Bleue
- 2019: Occident, Grasset
- 2020: Les Démons, Stock
- 2021: Liberty, Séguier
- 2022: Performance, Grasset

=== Cinema ===
- 2014: Rosa, short film, in collaboration with Eva Ionesco
