= Charles Matton =

French artist (1931–2008)

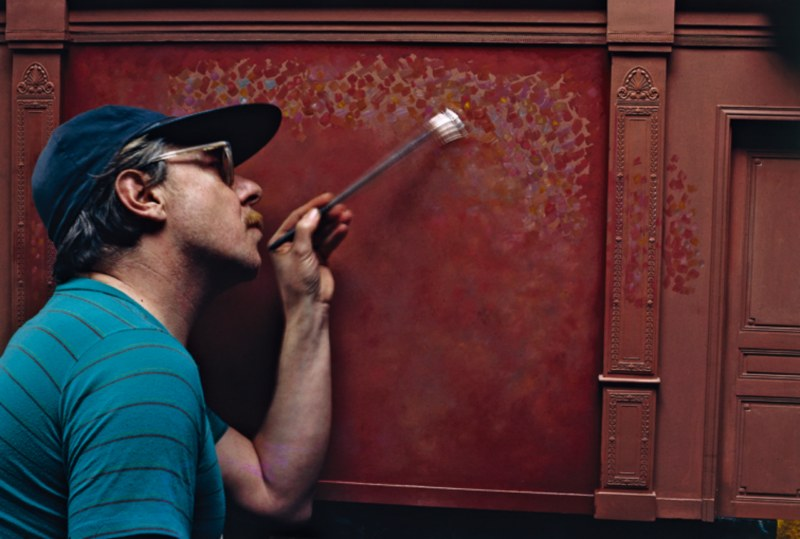
- Charles Matton in 1988
- Born: September 13, 1931; Paris, France
- Died: November 19, 2008 (aged 77)
- Known for: Painting, Sculpture, Illustration, Photography, Cinema
- Notable work: Dindon; Léonard's portrait; The New-York Loft; The Little-Fats' Merry-go-round; The great Lulu
- Movement: Hyperrealism
- Awards: Chevalier des Arts et Lettres

Charles Matton, also known as Gabriel Pasqualini, (13 September 1931 – 19 November 2008) was a multitalented French artist: painter, sculptor, illustrator, writer, photographer, screenwriter and a movie director.

== Illustrations ==
In the 1970s, Matton worked with Jean-Paul Goude at Esquire, working as an illustrator and a photographer.

== The Boxes ==
In 1983, Matton was able to show his art in Paris, and in 1987, he exhibited at the Palais de Tokyo. There, he showed what would become his famous Boxes. Then, in 1989, he exhibited at the Museum of Modern Art of Paris, the Centre Georges Pompidou.

During the last decade of his life, Matton showed his work all around the world, especially in New York and Los Angeles, through the Forum Gallery.

After his death, his wife, Sylvie Matton, kept promoting his work and exhibitions took place in Germany and England.

== Films ==
- 1999 : Rembrandt
- 1994 : The Light of the Dead Stars
- 1988 : Douanes (documentary)
- 1976 : Spermula
- 1972 : L’Italien des roses
- 1968 : Mai 68 ou les violences policières (short)
- 1967 : La Pomme ou l’histoire d’une histoire (short)
