= Jacques Bourboulon =

French photographer (born 1946)

Jacques Bourboulon (born 8 December 1946) is a French photographer, specializing in nude photography. In 1967 he started as a fashion photographer, publishing in Vogue and working for the fashion designers Dior, Féraud, and Carven. In the mid-1970s he switched to nude photography.

Bourboulon's pictures were shot with a Pentax camera and focus on bright light and sharp contrasts. His most typical pictures portray girls and women on the Spanish island of Ibiza, playing on the juxtaposition of blue sky, white walls, and sun-tanned skin. Frequently staged in erotic settings, these photographs combine erotic imagery with the visual style of fashion photography.

The most famous model of Jacques Bourboulon has been French actress Eva Ionesco, whom he photographed nude from the age of 10. Bourboulon made photos of Ionesco in provocative, eroticized poses and settings, ranging from topless portraits to more explicit images featuring open-legged poses. In 1976, his pictures were published in an October 1976 issue of Italian Playboy, making Eva Ionesco at 11 years old the youngest person to ever appear in this magazine. In 1981, Bourboulon published Eva, a portfolio containing photos from the Playboy shoot, but presented as loose sheets, printed on high quality photographic paper. The portfolio is still occasionally offered for sale by high-end auction houses.

Photographs by Bourboulon have appeared in such magazines as Playmen in Italy, High Society in its German edition, Club International in the United Kingdom, and Chasseur d'Images and PHOTO in France. They have been distributed online at MET ART and, between 2003 and 2008, at his official site jacques-bourboulon.net.

His 20 photography books sold over 400,000 copies.

He also produced calendars for Pentax and BASF.

== Books by Jacques Bourboulon ==
- Conte de Fées, 1980 - Tokyo: Tatsumi Publishing
- The Best Nudes 6, 1980 - Tokyo: Haga Shoten
- Des corps naturels, 1980 - Paris: Éditions Filipacchi - ISBN 2-85018-184-6
- Mädchen Natürlich, 1980 - Kehl am Rhein: Swan Verlag GmbH - ISBN 3-88230-014-0
- Eva (portfolio), 1981 - Marseille: AGEP Ed.
- Coquines, 1982 - Paris: Kactus - ISBN 2-85949-043-4
- GB Jacques Bourboulon, Galphy Series 7, 1982 - Tokyo: Nippon Geijutsu Shuppansha (NGS) - ISBN 4-89011-030-5
- GS Jacques Bourboulon, Galphy Series 7 (portfolio), 1982 - Tokyo: Nippon Geijutsu Shuppansha (NGS)
- Sha GIRL Bunko 7, 1982 - Tokyo: Nippon Geijutsu Shuppansha (NGS) - ISBN 4-89011-047-X
- GB Jacques Bourboulon, Part 2, Galphy Series 12, 1983 - Tokyo: Nippon Geijutsu Shuppansha (NGS) - ISBN 4-89011-066-6
- GS Jacques Bourboulon, Part 2, Galphy Series 12 (portfolio), 1983 - Tokyo: Nippon Geijutsu Shuppansha (NGS)
- Attitudes, 1984 - Paris: Carrère - ISBN 2-86804-010-1
- Lolita Fairy Tale, 1984 - Tokyo: Byakuya Shobo - ISBN 4-938256-55-X
- Coquines, 1986 - Milan: Visualbooks
- GB Jacques Bourboulon [Part 3, although not mentioned], Galphy Series [no number], 1987 - Tokyo: Nippon Geijutsu Shuppansha (NGS)
- GS Jacques Bourboulon [Part 3, although not mentioned], Galphy Series [no number] (portfolio), 1987 - Tokyo: Nippon Geijutsu Shuppansha (NGS)
- Mélodies, 1987 - Paris: JMV Diffusion - ISBN 2-86660-025-8
- Picture Works (portfolio), 1987 - Tokyo: Nippon Geijutsu Shuppansha (NGS)
- Seduzioni Gentili, 1987 - Milan: Visualbooks
- 17, 1988 - Flensburg: Carl Stephenson Verlag
- Freche Teens, 1988 - Flensburg: Orion Verlag
- Teenies, 1988 - Flensburg: Carl Stephenson Verlag
- ... gerade 17, 1990 - Flensburg: Orion Verlag
- Il Était une Fois, 1990 - Paris: Les Éditions Rares - ISBN 2-87851-010-0
- Jacques Bourboulon HQ Series (portfolio), 1992 - Tokyo: Nippon Geijutsu Shuppansha (NGS)
- Verbotene Früchte, 1992 - Flensburg: Orion Verlag
- Verdammt Jung! Damned young Lolitas, 1993 - Flensburg: Orion Verlag
- Jacques Bourboulon (Little Library), 1994 - Tokyo: Nippon Geijutsu Shuppansha (NGS) - ISBN 4-89011-349-5
- Jacques Bourboulon II (Little Library), 1994 - Tokyo: Nippon Geijutsu Shuppansha (NGS) - ISBN 4-89011-358-4
- Photographier le nu, 1996 - Paris: Editions VM - ISBN 2-86258-169-0

== Selected Magazine Pictorials by Jacques Bourboulon ==
- Club International (UK edition), June 1975
- ZOOM (French edition), January–February 1976 (#34)
- Playboy (Italian edition), October 1976 - "Classe del 1965!" (pictorial of Eva Ionesco)
- Siesta (Spain), #8 (1977)
- ZOOM (French edition), July/August 1979 (#64) - "Images de petites filles"
- PHOTO (French edition), June 1980 (#153) - "Tendres et naturelles - Jacques Bourboulon : une fête du printemps féminin"
- Playmen, July 1980 - "Le 'preferile' di Bourboulon / Vera / Effetto godibilita`"
- Photo Cinema Magazine, April 1981 (#18) - "images: la jeune fille de Bourboulon"
- Playmen, January 1982 - "Il Paradiso di Bourboulon"
- Photo Reporter, November 1982 (#49)
- Photo Reporter, November 1984 (#73) - "Les nymphettes impudiques de BOURBOULON"
- Lui (German edition), December 1984
- Ele e Ela (Brazil), #185 (1984)
- Photo Reporter, December 1985 (#86) - "Vive La Fête"
- Chasseur d'Images, March 1986 (#80)
- Photo Reporter, August 1986 (#94) - "Mes 250 femmes"
- High Society (German edition), #8 of 1986 (pictorial of Stephanie)
- Rebel Magazine, Fall-Winter 2004/2005 (#8)

Jacques Bourboulon has collaborated with more than 150 magazines in 21 countries throughout the world.
