= List of awards and nominations received by Isabelle Huppert =

Isabelle Huppert awards and nominations
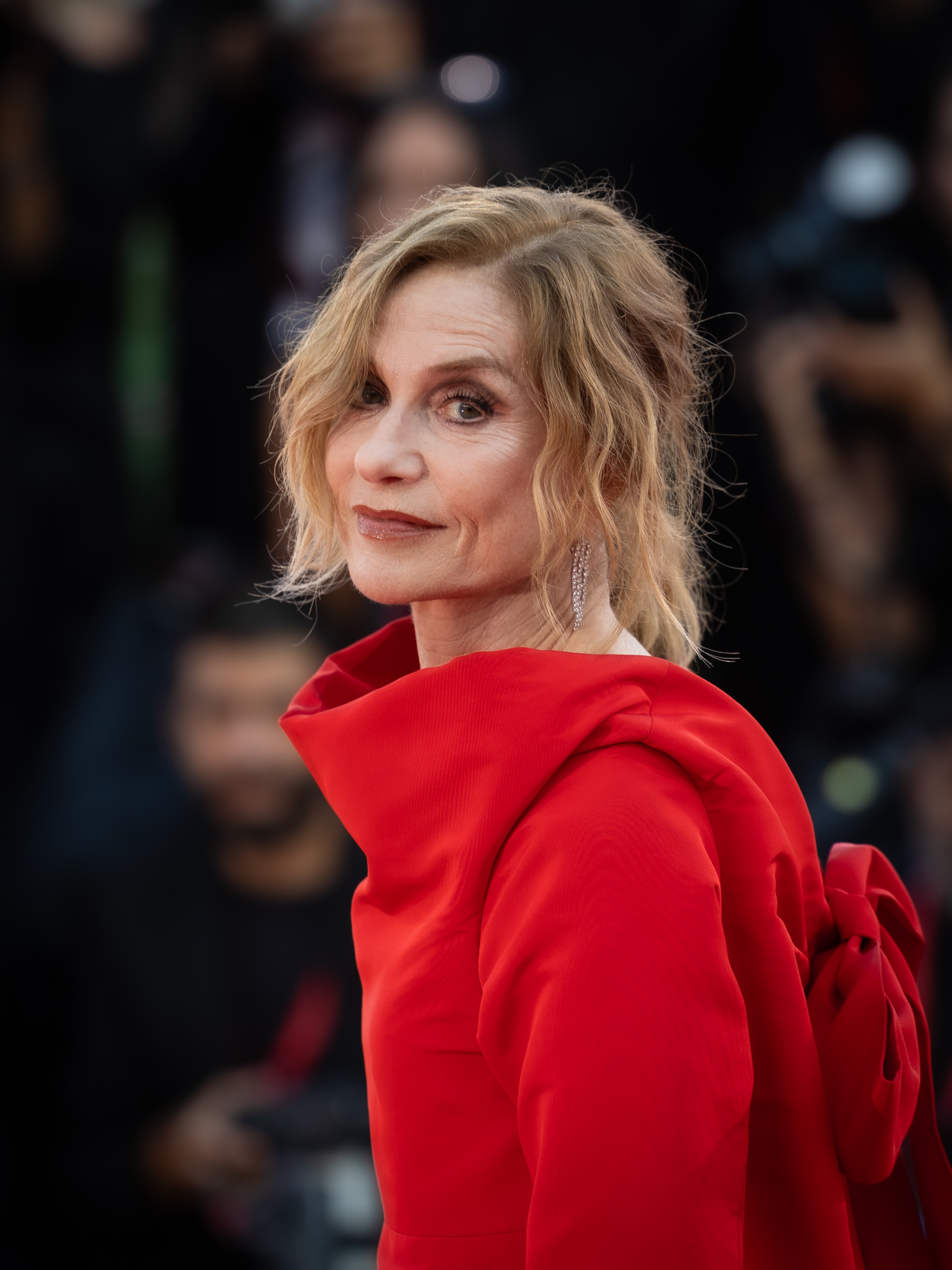
- Huppert at the 2024 Venice Film Festival
Awards and nominations
Award	Wins	Nominations
Academy Award	0	1
BAFTA Awards	1	1
Berlin Film Festival	2	2
Cannes Film Festival	3	3
César Awards	2	17
European Film Awards	2	6
Golden Globe Award	1	1
Independent Spirit Awards	1	1
Lumière Awards	5	7
Molière Awards	0	8
Venice Film Festival	4	4

Totals (Note: Certain award groups do not simply award one winner. They acknowledge several different recipients, have runners-up, and have third place. Since this is a specific recognition and is different from losing an award, runner-up mentions are considered wins in this award tally. For simplification and to avoid errors, each award in this list has been presumed to have had a prior nomination.)
- Wins: 77
- Nominations: 106

The following article is a List of awards and nominations received by Isabelle Huppert.

Isabelle Huppert is a French actress. She is known for her dynamic leading roles on stage and screen. Over her career she has received several awards including two César Awards, a BAFTA Award, a Golden Globe Award, and been nominated for the Academy Award for Best Actress. She is the most nominated actress for the César Award with 17 nominations. Huppert has twice won the Cannes Film Festival Award for Best Actress, twice won the Volpi Cup for Best Actress at Venice, and is a two-time winner of the European Film Award for Best Actress.

Huppert started her career earning the BAFTA Award for Most Promising Newcomer to Leading Film Roles for The Lacemaker (1978). She won the Cannes Film Festival Award for Best Actress twice for her roles as title role in the Claude Chabrol crime drama Violette Nozière (1978), and a sexually frustrated woman in the Michael Haneke erotic psychological drama The Piano Teacher (2001). She won the Venice International Film Festival's Volpi Cup for Best Actress twice for playing Marie-Louise Giraud in the French drama Story of Women (1988), and a postmistress in the thriller La Cérémonie (1995). She won the César Award for Best Actress twice for La Cérémonie (1995) and Elle (2016).

For her role as a rape survivor in the drama Elle (2016) she won the Golden Globe Award for Best Actress in a Motion Picture – Drama, and the Independent Spirit Award for Best Female Lead and was nominated for the Academy Award for Best Actress. She won the Berlin International Film Festival's Silver Bear for 8 Women (2002) and the Honorary Golden Bear in 2022. She was honored with the BFI Fellowship in 2011.

Huppert is the most nominated actress for the Molière Award, with 9 nominations. In 2017, she was awarded the Honorary Molière. In the same year she was awarded the Europe Theatre Prize. Huppert was made Chevalier of the Ordre national du Mérite in 1994 and was promoted to Officier in 2005. She was made a Chevalier of the Legion of Honour in 1999 and was promoted to Officer in 2009.

== Major associations ==
=== Academy Awards ===
Year	Category	Nominated work	Result	Ref.
2016	Best Actress	Elle	Nominated	

=== Golden Globe Awards ===
Year	Category	Nominated work	Result	Ref.
2017	Best Actress in a Motion Picture – Drama	Elle	Won	

=== BAFTA Awards ===
Year	Category	Nominated work	Result	Ref.
1978	Most Promising Newcomer to Leading Film Roles	The Lacemaker	Won	

=== Berlin International Film Festival ===
Year	Category	Nominated work	Result	Ref.
2002	Silver Bear for Outstanding Artistic Achievement (Note: Shared with the cast of 8 Women)	8 Women	Won	
2022	Honorary Golden Bear	—N/a	Honoured	

=== Cannes Film Festival ===
Year	Category	Nominated work	Result	Ref.
1978	Best Actress (Note: Tied with Jill Clayburgh for An Unmarried Woman)	Violette Nozière	Won	
2001	Best Actress	The Piano Teacher	Won	
2017	Women in Motion Award (Note: Presented by Kering and Cannes Film Festival)	—N/a	Honored	

=== César Awards ===
Year	Category	Nominated work	Result	Ref.
1976	Best Supporting Actress	Aloïse	Nominated	
1978	Best Actress	The Lacemaker	Nominated	
1979	Best Actress	Violette Nozière	Nominated	
1981	Best Actress	Loulou	Nominated	
1982	Best Actress	Coup de torchon	Nominated	
1989	Best Actress	Story of Women	Nominated	
1995	Best Actress	La Séparation	Nominated	
1996	Best Actress	La Cérémonie	Won	
1999	Best Actress	The School of Flesh	Nominated	
2001	Best Actress	Saint-Cyr	Nominated	
2002	Best Actress	The Piano Teacher	Nominated	
2003	Best Actress	8 Women	Nominated	
2006	Best Actress	Gabrielle	Nominated	
2013	Best Supporting Actress	Amour	Nominated	
2016	Best Actress	Valley of Love	Nominated	
2017	Best Actress	Elle	Won	
2026	Best Actress	The Richest Woman In The World	Nominated	

=== Venice Film Festival ===
Year	Category	Nominated work	Result	Ref.
1988	Volpi Cup for Best Actress (Note: Tied with Shirley MacLaine for Madame Sousatzka)	Story of Women	Won	
1995	Volpi Cup for Best Actress (Note: Shared with Sandrine Bonnaire)	La Cérémonie	Won	
1995	Pasinetti Award for Best Actress (Note: Shared with Sandrine Bonnaire)	La Cérémonie	Won	
2005	Special Lion	—N/a	Honored	

== Film festival awards ==
Organizations	Year	Category	Project	Result	Ref.
Art Film Fest	2007	Actor's Mission Award	—N/a	Honored	
Bogotá International Film Festival	1989	Best Actress	Story of Women	Won	
Busan International Film Festival	2011	Hand Printing	—N/a	Honored	
Cairo International Film Festival	2010	Best Actress (Note: Tied with Sawsan Badr for Lust)	Copacabana	Won	
Ebertfest	2017	Golden Thumb	Elle	Honored	
Festival International du Film Francophone de Namur	2008	Coup de Coeur	—N/a	Honored	
Filmfest Ludwigsburg	2001	European Actors Award	—N/a	Won	
Flanders International Film Festival	2011	Joseph Plateau Honorary Award	—N/a	Honored	
International Istanbul Film Festival	2011	Honorary Award	—N/a	Honored	
Karlovy Vary International Film Festival	2009	Crystal Globe for Outstanding Contribution to World Cinema	—N/a	Honored	
Lisbon & Estoril Film Festival	2010	Special Jury Award	Copacabana	Won	
Locarno International Film Festival	2011	Excellence Award	—N/a	Honored	
Locarno International Film Festival	2017	Best Actress Award	Madame Hyde	Won	
Manaki Brothers Film Festival	2013	Special Golden Camera 300	—N/a	Honored	
Mar del Plata International Film Festival	2008	Best Actress	Home	Won	
Marrakech International Film Festival	2012	Honorary Award	—N/a	Honored	
Miami International Film Festival	2018	Precious Gem – Icon Award	—N/a	Honored	
Montreal World Film Festival	2000	Best Actress (Note: Tied with Gong Li for Breaking the Silence)	Merci pour le chocolat	Won	
Montreal World Film Festival	2008	Grand Prix Special des Amériques	—N/a	Honored	
Moscow International Film Festival	1991	Best Actress	Madame Bovary	Won	
Moscow International Film Festival	2008	Stanislavsky Award	—N/a	Honored	
Mumbai International Film Festival	2011	Best Actress (Note: Shared with Anamaria Vartolomei)	My Little Princess	Won	
Munich International Film Festival	2014	Lifetime Achievement Award	—N/a	Honored	
Odesa International Film Festival	2017	Golden Duke	—N/a	Honored	
Palm Springs International Film Festival	2017	FIPRESCI Prize for Best Actress in a Foreign Language Film	Elle	Won	
Philadelphia Film Festival	2010	Best Actress	Copacabana	Won	
Pula Film Festival	2002	Best Actress – Foreign Film	The Piano Teacher	Won	
Rome Film Festival	2018	Lifetime Achievement Award	—N/a	Won	
San Sebastián International Film Festival	2003	Donostia Lifetime Achievement Award	—N/a	Honored	
Santa Barbara International Film Festival	2017	Montecito Award	Elle	Won	
Seattle International Film Festival	2002	Best Actress	The Piano Teacher	Won	
Shanghai International Film Festival	2009	Special Artistic Achievement Award	—N/a	Honored	
Stockholm International Film Festival	2011	Lifetime Achievement Award	—N/a	Honored	
Telluride Film Festival	1986	Silver Medallion	—N/a	Honored	
Valladolid International Film Festival	1988	Best Actress	Story of Women	Won	

== Critics associations awards ==
Organizations	Year	Category	Project	Result	Ref.
Boston Society of Film Critics	2016	Best Actress	Elle / Things to Come	Won	
Chicago Film Critics Association	2016	Best Actress	Elle	Nominated	
Critics' Choice Movie Awards	2016	Best Actress	Elle	Nominated	
Dallas–Fort Worth Film Critics Association	2002	Best Actress	The Piano Teacher	Nominated	
Dublin Film Critics' Circle	2016	Best Actress	Things to Come	Nominated	
Dublin Film Critics' Circle	2017	Best Actress (Note: Tied with Natalie Portman for Jackie)	Elle	Won	
Florida Film Critics Circle	2016	Best Actress	Elle	Won	
Houston Film Critics Society	2016	Best Actress	Elle	Nominated	
London Film Critics' Circle	2012	Supporting Actress of the Year	Amour	Nominated	
London Film Critics' Circle	2016	Actress of the Year	Things to Come	Won	
London Film Critics' Circle	2016	Dilys Powell Award	—N/a	Honored	
London Film Critics' Circle	2017	Actress of the Year	Elle	Nominated	
Los Angeles Film Critics Association	2002	Best Actress	The Piano Teacher	2nd Place	
Los Angeles Film Critics Association	2016	Best Actress	Elle / Things to Come	Won	
National Society of Film Critics	2002	Best Actress (Note: Tied with Maggie Gyllenhaal for Secretary)	The Piano Teacher	2nd Place	
National Society of Film Critics	2016	Best Actress	Elle / Things to Come	Won	
New York Film Critics Circle	2002	Best Actress	The Piano Teacher	3rd Place	
New York Film Critics Circle	2016	Best Actress	Elle / Things to Come	Won	
New York Film Critics Online	2016	Best Actress	Elle	Won	
Online Film Critics Society	2002	Best Actress	The Piano Teacher	Nominated	
Online Film Critics Society	2016	Best Actress	Elle	Nominated	
Russian Guild of Film Critics	2001	Golden Aries	The Piano Teacher	Won	
Russian Guild of Film Critics	2002	Golden Aries	8 Women	Won	
San Diego Film Critics Society	2002	Special Award (Note: For the body of work in the last year)	Sentimental Destinies / Nightcap / The Piano Teacher / 8 Women	Won	
San Francisco Film Critics Circle	2002	Best Actress	The Piano Teacher	Won	
San Francisco Film Critics Circle	2016	Best Actress	Elle	Won	
Seattle Film Critics Society	2017	Best Actress	Elle	Won	
St. Louis Film Critics Association	2016	Best Actress	Elle	Won	
Toronto Film Critics Association	2002	Best Actress	The Piano Teacher	Nominated	
Toronto Film Critics Association	2016	Best Actress	Elle	Nominated	
Vancouver Film Critics Circle	2016	Best Actress	Elle	Won	

== Miscellaneous awards ==
Organizations	Year	Category	Project	Result	Ref.
AACTA International Awards	2017	Best Actress	Elle	Nominated	
AARP Movies for Grownups Awards	2016	Best Actress	Elle	Nominated	
Alliance of Women Film Journalists	2016	Actress Defying Age and Ageism (Note: Tied with Annette Bening for 20th Century Women)	Elle	Won	
Alliance of Women Film Journalists	2016	Best Actress	Elle	Nominated	
Alliance of Women Film Journalists	2016	Bravest Performance	Elle	Won	
Buil Film Awards	2012	Best Actress	In Another Country	Nominated	
David di Donatello Awards	1980	Best Foreign Actress	The Lacemaker	Won	
David di Donatello Awards	1989	Best Foreign Actress	Story of Women	Nominated	
David di Donatello Awards	2003	Career David	—N/a	Honored	
Dorian Awards	2016	Film Performance of the Year – Actress	Elle	Nominated	
European Film Awards	2001	Best Actress	The Piano Teacher	Won	
European Film Awards	2002	Best Actress (Note: Shared with the cast of 8 Women)	8 Women	Won	
European Film Awards	2002	People's Choice Award for Best Actress	8 Women	Nominated	
European Film Awards	2004	People's Choice Award for Best Actress	Ma mère	Nominated	
European Film Awards	2009	Outstanding European Achievement in World Cinema	—N/a	Honored	
European Film Awards	2016	Best Actress	Elle	Nominated	
European Film Awards	2017	Best Actress	Happy End	Nominated	
German Film Awards	1991	Best Performance by an Actress in a Leading Role	Malina	Won	
Globes de Cristal Awards	2017	Best Actress	Elle	Won	
Globes de Cristal Awards	2017	Best Stage Actress	Phaedra(s)	Nominated	
Gold Derby Awards	2017	Best Actress	Elle	Nominated	
Gotham Awards	2016	Best Actress	Elle	Won	
Ibsen Centennial Commemoration	2006	Ibsen Centennial Commemoration Award	—N/a	Honored	
Independent Spirit Awards	2017	Best Female Lead	Elle	Won	
Indiewire Critics' Poll	2010	Best Lead Performance	White Material	8th Place	
Indiewire Critics' Poll	2016	Best Lead Actress	Elle	Won	
Indiewire Critics' Poll	2016	Best Lead Actress	Things to Come	10th Place	
Le Film français	2017	Personality of the Year	—N/a	Won	
Lumière Awards	1996	Best Actress	La Cérémonie	Won	
Lumière Awards	2001	Best Actress	Merci pour le chocolat	Won	
Lumière Awards	2006	Best Actress	Gabrielle	Won	
Lumière Awards	2007	Best Actress	Comedy of Power	Nominated	
Lumière Awards	2016	Best Actress	Valley of Love	Nominated	
Lumière Awards	2017	Best Actress	Elle	Won	
Message to Man	2016	Golden Centaur	—N/a	Won	
Molière Awards	1989	Best Actress	A Month in the Country	Nominated	
Molière Awards	1994	Best Actress	Orlando	Nominated	
Molière Awards	1995	Best Actress	Orlando	Nominated	
Molière Awards	2001	Best Actress	Medea	Nominated	
Molière Awards	2005	Best Actress	Hedda Gabler	Nominated	
Molière Awards	2014	Best Actress	Les Fausses Confidences	Nominated	
Molière Awards	2016	Best Actress	Phaedra(s)	Nominated	
Molière Awards	2017	Honorary Molière	—N/a	Honored	
Molière Awards	2022	Best Actress	The Cherry Orchard	Nominated	
Molière Awards	2023	Best Actress	The Glass Menagerie	Nominated	
Nastro d'Argento	2009	European Silver Ribbon	Hidden Love	Won	
Prix Suzanne Bianchetti	1976	Prix Suzanne Bianchetti	The Judge and the Assassin	Won	
Sant Jordi Awards	1990	Best Foreign Actress	Story of Women	Won	
Satellite Awards	2017	Best Actress – Motion Picture (Note: Tied with Ruth Negga for Loving)	Elle	Won	
UniFrance	2016	French Cinema Award	—N/a	Honored	
Village Voice Film Poll	2002	Best Performance	The Piano Teacher	3rd Place	
Village Voice Film Poll	2010	Best Actress (Note: Tied with Michelle Williams for Blue Valentine)	White Material	10th Place	
Village Voice Film Poll	2012	Best Supporting Actress	Amour	9th Place	
Village Voice Film Poll	2014	Best Actress	Abuse of Weakness	7th Place	
Village Voice Film Poll	2016	Best Actress	Elle	Won	
Village Voice Film Poll	2016	Best Actress	Things to Come	8th Place	

== Honorary awards ==
Organizations	Year	Notes	Result	Ref.
National Order of Merit	1994	Chevalier (Knight)	Honored	
Legion of Honour	1999	Chevalier (Knight)	Honored	
National Order of Merit	2005	Officier (Officer)	Honored	
Camerimage	2008	Krzysztof Kieslowski Award	Honored	
Legion of Honour	2009	Officier (Officer)	Honored	
British Film Institute	2011	BFI Fellowship	Honored	
Lumière Awards	2016	Honorary Lumière Award	Honored	
Europe Theatre Prize	2017	Europe Theatre Prize	Honored	
Berlin International Film Festival	2022	Honorary Golden Bear	Honored	

== See also ==
- List of Isabelle Huppert performances
