= List of Isabelle Huppert performances =

French actress

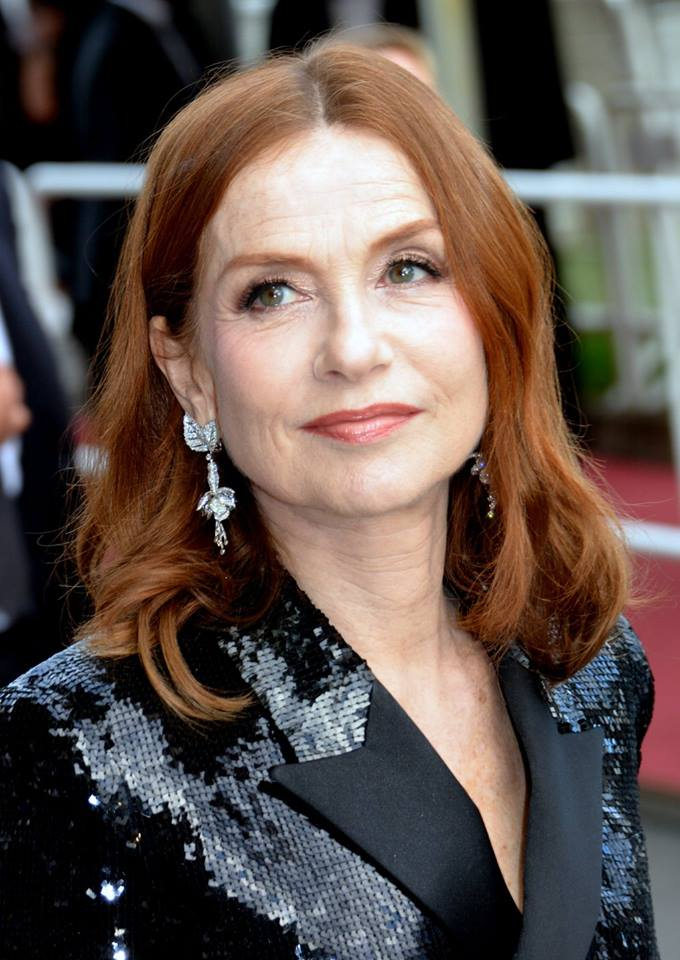
Huppert at the 2018 Cannes Film Festival

Isabelle Huppert is a French actress who has appeared in more than 120 feature films, mostly in starring roles. Regarded as one of the most respected actresses in French cinema, she has appeared in films directed by Claude Chabrol, Jean-Luc Godard and Michael Haneke. She has also starred in numerous stage productions, in Paris and around the world. In 2022 she received the Berlin Film Festival's Honorary Golden Bear.

She made her film debut in 1972 before her big break in Bertrand Blier's comedy-drama Les Valseuses (1974), which was a success in France. Huppert's first English-language film was Rosebud (1975), directed by Otto Preminger and starring Peter O'Toole.

As of 2022, she has appeared in 22 films that have been screened In Competition at the Cannes Film Festival. At Cannes she has won the Best Actress Award twice, for her roles in Violette Nozière (1978) and The Piano Teacher (2001). She has also won a BAFTA Award for Most Promising Newcomer for The Lacemaker (1977), and two Volpi Cups at Venice for Story of Women (1988) and La Cérémonie (1995). She has been nominated for 16 César Awards, twice winning the Best Actress award, for La Cérémonie and for Elle. Huppert won the Golden Globe Award for Best Actress in a Motion Picture – Drama and received a nomination for the Academy Award for Best Actress for her work in Paul Verhoeven's Elle (2016).

Huppert is the most nominated actress for the Molière Award, with eight nominations; she received an honorary lifetime achievement award in 2017. In 2017 she was also awarded the Europe Theatre Prize.

== Acting credits ==
=== Film ===
Key
†	Denotes films that have not yet been released

Year	Title	Role	Notes	Ref.
1972	Faustine et le Bel Été	Student #2	(Out of Competition – 1972 Cannes Film Festival)	
1972	The Bar at the Crossing	Annie Smith	(In Competition – 1972 Berlin Film Festival)	
1972	César and Rosalie	Marite		
1974	Successive Slidings of Pleasure	Bit		
1974	Going Places	Jacqueline		
1974	L'Ampélopède	The storyteller		
1975	Serious as Pleasure	A girl brought home		
1975	The Common Man	Brigitte Colin	(In Competition – 1975 Berlin Film Festival)	
1975	Rosebud	Helene Nikolaos		
1975	Aloïse	Aloïse as a child	(In Competition – 1975 Cannes Film Festival)	
1975	The Big Delirium	Marie		
1976	Docteur Françoise Gailland	Élisabeth Gailland		
1976	The Judge and the Assassin	Rose		
1976	Little Marcel	Yvette		
1976	I Am Pierre Riviere	Aimée		
1977	The Lacemaker	Pomme	(In Competition – 1977 Cannes Film Festival)	
1977	Spoiled Children	The secretary of the deputy	Uncredited	
1977	The Indians Are Still Far Away	Jenny		
1978	Violette Nozière	Violette Nozière	(In Competition – 1978 Cannes Film Festival)	
1979	Scénario de 'Sauve qui peut la vie	Herself	Short film	
1979	Return to the Beloved	Jeanne Kern		
1979	The Brontë Sisters	Anne Brontë	(In Competition – 1979 Cannes Film Festival)	
1980	Every Man for Himself	Isabelle Rivière	(In Competition – 1980 Cannes Film Festival)	
1980	The Heiresses	Irène	(In Competition – 1980 Cannes Film Festival)	
1980	Loulou	Nelly	(In Competition – 1980 Cannes Film Festival)	
1980	Heaven's Gate	Ella Watson	(In Competition – 1981 Cannes Film Festival)	
1981	The Lady of the Camellias	Alphonsine Plessis		
1981	The Wings of the Dove	Marie		
1981	Coup de Torchon	Rose Mercaillou		
1981	Eaux profondes	Melanie		
1982	Passion	Isabelle	(In Competition – 1982 Cannes Film Festival)	
1982	The Trout	Frédérique		
1983	The Story of Piera	Piera	(In Competition – 1983 Cannes Film Festival)	
1983	Entre Nous	Lena Weber	Also known as Coup de foudre	
1983	My Best Friend's Girl	Viviane		
1984	La Garce	Aline Kaminker / Édith Weber		
1985	Sincerely Charlotte	Charlotte		
1985	All Mixed Up	Rose-Marie Martin		
1986	Cactus	Colo		
1987	The Bedroom Window	Sylvia Wentworth		
1988	The Possessed	Maria Sjatov		
1988	Story of Women	Marie	(In Competition – 1988 Venice Film Festival)	
1988	Milan noir	Sarah		
1989	Migrations	Dafina Isakovic		
1990	A Woman's Revenge	Cécile	(In Competition – 1990 Berlin Film Festival)	
1991	Malina	The Woman	(In Competition – 1991 Cannes Film Festival)	
1991	Madame Bovary	Emma Bovary		
1992	Love After Love	Lola		
1993	The Flood	Sofia	Also associate producer	
1994	Amateur	Isabelle		
1994	La Séparation	Anne		
1995	La Cérémonie	Jeanne	(In Competition – 1995 Venice Film Festival)	
1996	The Elective Affinities	Carlotta	(Out of Competition – 1996 Cannes Film Festival)	
1997	Les Palmes de M. Schutz	Marie Curie		
1997	The Swindle	Elizabeth / Betty		
1998	The School of Flesh	Dominique	(In Competition – 1998 Cannes Film Festival)	
1999	No Scandal	Agnès Jeancourt	(In Competition – 1999 Venice Film Festival)	
2000	Modern Life	Claire		
2000	False Servant	La comtesse		
2000	The King's Daughters	Madame de Maintenon	(Un Certain Regard – 2000 Cannes Film Festival)	
2000	Sentimental Destinies	Nathalie Barnery	(In Competition – 2000 Cannes Film Festival)	
2000	Comedy of Innocence	Ariane	(In Competition – 2000 Venice Film Festival)	
2000	Merci pour le Chocolat	Marie-Claire 'Mika' Muller		
2001	The Piano Teacher	Erika Kohut	(In Competition – 2001 Cannes Film Festival)	
2002	8 Women (8 femmes)	Augustine	(In Competition – 2002 Berlin Film Festival)	
2002	Two	Magdalena / Maria		
2002	La vie promise	Sylvia		
2003	Time of the Wolf	Anne Laurent	(Out of Competition – 2003 Cannes Film Festival)	
2004	Ma Mère	Hélène		
2004	I Heart Huckabees	Caterine Vauban		
2004	Les Sœurs fâchées	Martine Demouthy		
2005	Gabrielle	Gabrielle Hervey	(In Competition – 2005 Venice Film Festival)	
2006	Comedy of Power	Jeanne Charmant-Killman	(In Competition – 2006 Berlin Film Festival)	
2006	Private Property	Pascale	(In Competition – 2006 Venice Film Festival)	
2007	Hidden Love	Danielle		
2007	Medea Miracle	Irène / Médée		
2008	Home	Marthe		
2008	The Sea Wall	Mother		
2009	Villa Amalia	Ann		
2009	White Material	Maria Vial	(In Competition – 2009 Venice Film Festival)	
2010	Copacabana	Elisabeth Delmotte, known as Babou		
2010	Sans queue ni tête	Alice Bergerac		
2010	Fantastic Mr. Fox	Mrs. Felicity Fox (voice)	French dubbed version	
2011	Die Blutgräfin	Maid Hermine		
2011	My Little Princess	Hanna Giurgiu		
2011	My Worst Nightmare	Agathe Novic		
2012	Dubaï Flamingo	The goat (voice)	Uncredited	
2012	Captive	Thérèse Bourgoine	(In Competition – 2012 Berlin Film Festival)	
2012	Amour	Eva	(In Competition – 2012 Cannes Film Festival)	
2012	In Another Country	Anne	(In Competition – 2012 Cannes Film Festival)	
2012	Dormant Beauty	Divina Madre	(In Competition – 2012 Venice Film Festival)	
2012	Lines of Wellington	Cosima Pia	(In Competition – 2012 Venice Film Festival)	
2013	The Nun	Supérieure Saint Eutrope	(In Competition – 2013 Berlin Film Festival)	
2013	Michael H – Profession: Director	Herself	Documentary	
2013	Dead Man Down	Maman Louzon		
2013	Tip Top	Esther Lafarge	(Directors' Fortnight – 2013 Cannes Film Festival)	
2013	Abuse of Weakness	Maud Schoenberg		
2013	The Disappearance of Eleanor Rigby	Mary Rigby	(Un Certain Regard – 2014 Cannes Film Festival)	
2014	Paris Follies	Brigitte Lecanu		
2014	Dior and I	Herself	Documentary	
2015	Macadam Stories	Jeanne Meyer	(Special Screening – 2015 Cannes Film Festival)	
2015	Louder Than Bombs	Isabelle Reed	(In Competition – 2015 Cannes Film Festival)	
2015	Valley of Love	Isabelle	(In Competition – 2015 Cannes Film Festival)	
2016	Things to Come	Nathalie Chazeaux	(In Competition – 2016 Berlin Film Festival)	
2016	Elle	Michèle Leblanc	(In Competition – 2016 Cannes Film Festival)	
2016	Tout de suite maintenant	Solveig		
2016	Close Encounters with Vilmos Zsigmond	Herself	(Cannes Classics – 2016 Cannes Film Festival); Documentary	
2016	Souvenir	Liliane Cheverny, known as Laura		
2016	What Tears Us Apart	Isabelle	Short film	
2017	Barrage	Elisabeth	(Forum – 2017 Berlin Film Festival)	
2017	Claire's Camera	Claire	(Special Screening – 2017 Cannes Film Festival)	
2017	Happy End	Anne Laurent	(In Competition – 2017 Cannes Film Festival)	
2017	Madame Hyde	Marie Géquil / Madame Hyde		
2017	Reinventing Marvin	Isabelle Huppert	(Horizons – 2017 Venice Film Festival)	
2018	Isle of Dogs	Interpreter Woman (voice)	(In Competition – 2018 Berlin Film Festival); French dubbed version	
2018	Eva	Eva	(In Competition – 2018 Berlin Film Festival)	
2018	Greta	Greta Hideg		
2019	Golden Youth	Lucile Wood	Also known as Une jeunesse dorée	
2019	White as Snow	Maud	Also known as Blanche comme neige	
2019	Frankie	Françoise Crémont, known as Frankie	(In Competition – 2019 Cannes Film Festival)	
2020	Mama Weed	Patience Portefeux		
2021	Promises	Clémence Collombet	(Horizons – 2021 Venice Film Festival)	
2022	About Joan	Joan Verra	(Special Gala – 2022 Berlin Film Festival)	
2022	EO	The Countess	(In Competition – 2022 Cannes Film Festival)	
2022	Mrs. Harris Goes to Paris	Claudine Colbert		
2022	The Sitting Duck	Maureen Kearney	(Orizzonti Competition – 2022 Venice Film Festival)	
2022	Caravaggio's Shadow	Costanza Sforza Colonna		
2023	The Crime Is Mine	Odette Chaumette		
2023	Sidonie in Japan	Sidonie Perceval		
2023	Marianne	Marianne		
2024	A Traveler's Needs	Iris	(In Competition – 2024 Berlin Film Festival)	
2024	My New Friends	Lucie	(Panorama – 2024 Berlin Film Festival)	
2024	La Prisonnière de Bordeaux	Alma Lund		
2024	Two People Exchanging Saliva	—N/a	Short; executive producer	
2025	Luz	Sabine	(In Competition - 2025 Sundance Film Festival)	
2025	The Richest Woman in the World	Marianne Farrère	(Premieres - 2025 Cannes Film Festival)	
2026	The Blood Countess	Erzsébet Báthory	(Special Gala – 2026 Berlin Film Festival)	
2026	Parallel Tales	Sylvie	(In Competition – 2026 Cannes Film Festival)	
2026	All About Corinne (Ni vue, ni connue)	Corinne		

=== Television ===
Year	Title	Role(s)	Notes	Ref.
1971	Le Prussien	Elisabeth	TV film	
1971	Les Cent Livres des Hommes	Gilberte	Episode: "Du côté des chez Swann"	
1972	Figaro-ci, Figaro-là	Pauline	TV film	
1973	Histoire vraie	Adelaïde	TV film	
1973	Le Maître de pension	Annie	TV film	
1973	Le Drakkar	Yolande	TV film	
1973	Vogue la galère	Clotilde	TV film	
1974	Madame Baptiste	Blanche	TV film	
1974	Plaies et bosses	Patsy Lackan	TV film	
1977	No Trifling with Love	Camille	TV film	
1995	Un siècle d'écrivains	Narrator	Episode: "Nathalie Sarraute"	
1996	Gulliver's Travels	Houyhnhnm Mistress (voice)	Episode #1.2	
2001	Médée	Médée	TV film	
2001	Isabelle Huppert, une vie pour jouer	Herself	Documentary	
2010	Law & Order: Special Victims Unit	Sophie Gerard	Episode: "Shattered"	
2016	False Confessions	Araminte	TV film; released in U.S. theatres in July 2017	
2017	I Love Isabelle Huppert	Herself	Documentary	
2018	Call My Agent!	Herself	Episode: "Isabelle"	
2018	The Romanoffs	Jacqueline	Episode: "House of Special Purpose"	

=== Theater ===
Year(s)	Play	Role	Venue(s)	Ref.
1971–72	Les Précieuses ridicules	Lucile	Comédie-Française, Paris	
1972	A Hunger Artist	Caged panther	National Theatre Daniel Sorano, Paris; Shiraz Arts Festival	
1973	The True Story of Jack the Ripper (La Véritable Histoire de Jack l'éventreur)		Café-théâtre Le Sélénite, Paris	
1973	The Miser	Marianne	Tour across universities in 25 American states	
1973	Will There Be Another Summer? (Viendra-t-il un autre été ?)	Murielle	Odéon-Théâtre de l'Europe, Paris	
1974	For Whom the Bell Tolls	Maria	Comédie de Reims	
1975	Travel Around My Pot (Voyage autour de ma marmite)		Théâtre Essaïon, Paris	
1977	No Trifling with Love (On ne badine pas avec l'amour)	Camille	Théâtre des Bouffes du Nord, Paris	
1989	A Month in the Country	Natalia Petrovna	Théâtre Édouard VII, Paris	
1991	Measure for Measure	Isabella	Odéon-Théâtre de l'Europe; Théâtre National Populaire, Paris; Opéra-Théâtre de Clermont-Ferrand; Maison de la Culture, Chambéry; Théâtre de Nîmes; Maison de la Culture, Le Havre	
1992	Jeanne d'Arc au bûcher	Joan of Arc	Opéra Bastille, Paris	
1993–95	Orlando	Orlando	Théatre Vidy, Lausanne; Odéon-Théâtre de l'Europe, Paris	
1996	Mary Stuart	Mary, Queen of Scots	National Theatre, London	
2000–01	Medea	Medea	Festival d'Avignon, Odéon-Théâtre de l'Europe, Paris; La Rochelle; Toulouse	
2002–03	4.48 Psychosis	She	Théâtre des Bouffes du Nord, Paris; Tour around Caen, Geneva, Lorient, Lisbon, Villeurbanne, Rennes, and São Paulo	
2003	Jeanne d'Arc au bûcher	Joan of Arc	Teatro Nacional de São Carlos, Lisbon	
2005	Hedda Gabler	Hedda Gabler	Odéon-Théâtre de l'Europe, Paris; Tour around Caen, Geneva, Barcelona, Hérouville-Saint-Clair, and Festival de la Ruhr	
2005	4.48 Psychosis	She	Théâtre des 13 vents, Paris; UCLA Arts, Los Angeles; Brooklyn Academy of Music; Montreal; Berlin; Milan	
2006–07	Quartett	Madame de Merteuil	Odéon-Théâtre de l'Europe, Paris; Piccolo Teatro, Milan; Berliner Festspiele; Théâtre du Gymnase, Marseille; Comédie de Genève	
2008	God of Carnage	Véronique Houillé	Théâtre Antoine-Simone Berriau, Paris	
2009	Quartett	Madame de Merteuill	São Paulo; Porto Alegre; Brooklyn Academy of Music	
2010–12	A Streetcar Named Desire	Blanche DuBois	Odéon-Théâtre de l'Europe, Paris; Berliner Festspiele; Maison de la culture de Grenoble; Grand Théâtre de Luxembourg; Polish Theatre in Warsaw; Athens; Genève; Amsterdam; The Hague; Adelaide Festival	
2013–14	The Maids	Solange	Sydney Theatre Company, Sydney; New York City Center	
2014–15	Les Fausses Confidences	Araminte	Odéon-Théâtre de l'Europe, Paris; Tour throughout France	
2016	Phèdre(s)	Phèdre	Odéon-Théâtre de l'Europe, Paris; Comédie de Clermont-Ferrand; Barbican, London; Brooklyn Academy of Music; Théâtre de Liège; Onassis Cultural Center, Athens	
2017	Correspondence 1944-1959 Readings from the epistles between Albert Camus and Maria Casares	Maria	Teatro Argentina, Rome	
2017	Ashes to Ashes (Special creation for the Europe Theatre Prize)	Rebecca	Teatro Argentina, Rome	
2019	The Mother	Mother	Atlantic Theater Company, New York City	
2019-25	Mary Said What She Said	Mary, Queen of Scots	Théâtre de la Ville, Paris; Vienna Festival, Vienna; Cultural Centre of Belém, Lisbon; Teatre Lliure, Barcelona; Thalia Theater, Hamburg; Teatro della Pergola, Florence; Barbican, London Skirball Center for the Performing Arts, New York	
2020–22	The Glass Menagerie	Amanda Wingfield	Odéon-Théâtre de l'Europe, Paris; Onassis Stegi, Athens; Internationaal Theater Amsterdam; New National Theatre Tokyo	
2021–23	The Cherry Orchard	Lyubov Ranevskaya	Festival d'Avignon; Pompeii Theatrum Mundi; Teatro National D. Maria II, Lisbon; Odéon-Théâtre de l'Europe, Paris; Theatre de Liege; Comedie de Geneve; Internationaal Theater Amsterdam; MuseumsQuartier, Vienna; Comédie de Clermont-Ferrand; La Coursive Scène nationale de la Rochelle; Théâtre National Populaire; National Taichung Theater, Taïwan	
2024	Bérénice	Bérénice	Théâtre de la Ville, Paris	

== Public readings ==
Date(s)	Title	Author(s)	Venue(s)	Ref.
20 January 2006	Selected text	Maurice Blanchot and Françoise Sagan	Cinémathèque Française	
18 October 2010	Just Kids	Patti Smith	Odéon-Théâtre de l'Europe	
26 November 2012	Une tribu, voilà ce que je suis, Je suis une erreur, Another sleepy dusty delta day (Note: From Jan Fabre 4 solos)	Jan Fabre	Théâtre de Gennevilliers	
2015–18, December 2022	Juliette et Justine, le vice et la vertu	Marquis de Sade	Festival d'Avignon / Théâtre des Capucins / Printemps des comédiens / Ancient Theatre of Fourvière / Queen Elizabeth Hall/ Antipolis Theatre d'Antibes	
2017–18	The Lover	Marguerite Duras	Shanghai Culture Square / Guangzhou Opera House / Beijing Tianqiao Performing Arts Center / Teatro di San Carlo / Thalia Hall	

== Discography ==
=== Albums ===
- 2001: Madame Deshoulières with Jean-Louis Murat

=== Tracks ===
- 1976: "La Commune Est En Lutte" for the soundtrack of The Judge and the Assassin
- 1976: "Promenade" for the soundtrack of The Judge and the Assassin
- 1981: "Dans La Chambre Vide (Romance)" for the soundtrack of Coup de Torchon
- 1985: "Signé Charlotte! (Souvenir Chiffonné)" for the soundtrack of Sincerely Charlotte
- 2002: "Message personnel" for the soundtrack of 8 Women
- 2004: "Rue De Jollières" for the soundtrack of Les Sœurs fâchées
- 2016: "Joli Garçon" for the soundtrack of Souvenir
- 2016: "Souvenir" for the soundtrack of Souvenir

=== Audiobooks ===
- 1988: Le Roseau révolté by Nina Berberova
- 1994: The Flood (L’Inondation) by Yevgeny Zamyatin
- 1994: Music and Poetry (Musique et Poésie) by Ingeborg Bachmann in Voices of Women for Democracy (Voix de femmes pour la démocratie)
- 2009: Tropisms (Tropismes) by Nathalie Sarraute

== See also ==
- List of awards and nominations received by Isabelle Huppert
