= Ronald Chammah =

French film producer and director

Ronald-Ariel Chammah (born in Lebanon on 2 January 1951) is a French film producer, distributor, event curator and director of Syrian Jewish ancestry. He is the long term partner of Isabelle Huppert and the father of their three children Lolita Chammah, Lorenzo and Angelo.

After having worked as assistant director on several films in the 1970s and 1980s and directed his own film Milan noir in 1987, Chammah moved over to the production side of the film industry, setting up the production and distribution company Les Films du Camélia in 1988, which is mainly focused on supporting independent American films and restoration and re-release of overlooked classics, especially Italian and Mexican. He also runs two arthouse cinemas in Paris.

== Selected filmography ==
- 1978: Mœurs cachées de la bourgeoisie, by Tonino Cervi (as assistant director)
- 1983: L'Homme blessé, by Patrice Chéreau (as assistant director)
- 1984: Les Cavaliers de l'orage, by Gérard Vergez (as assistant director)
- 1988: Milan noir (as director)
- 1994: L'Inondation, by Igor Minaiev (as associate producer)
- 1999: La Vie moderne, by Laurence Ferreira Barbosa (as co-producer)
- 1999: Saint-Cyr, by Patricia Mazuy (as co-producer)
- 2000: De l'origine du xxie siècle, by Jean-Luc Godard (as narrator)
- 2000: Comédie de l'innocence, by Raoul Ruiz (as co-producer)
- 2004: Ma mère, by Christophe Honoré (as co-producer)
- 2007: Médée Miracle, by Tonino De Bernardi (as co-producer)
