= Joaquim de Almeida filmography =

Joaquim António Portugal Baptista de Almeida (Portuguese pronunciation: [ʒuɐˈkĩ dɨ alˈmɐjðɐ]; born 15 March 1957) is a Portuguese actor, who has appeared in more than 100 film and television roles. After doing some theater, Almeida began acting during the 1980s, appearing in films such as The Soldier (1982), The Honorary Consul (1983), Good Morning, Babylon (1987) and Milan noir (1988).

Almeida achieved international fame with his portrayals of Félix Cortez in the Phillip Noyce's thriller Clear and Present Danger (1994), drug kingpin Bucho in Desperado (1995), Ramon Salazar on the Fox thriller drama series 24 (2003–04) and Hernan Reyes in the 2011 street racing action film Fast Five. Some of his other well-known films are Only You (1994), The Mask of Zorro (1998), Behind Enemy Lines (2001), The Celestine Prophecy (2006), The Death and Life of Bobby Z (2007), Che: Part Two (2008) and The Burning Plain (2008).

Almeida has received multiple international awards and nominations for his notable roles in Retrato de Família (1992), Adão e Eva (1995), Sostiene Pereira (1997), Tentação (1998), O Xangô de Baker Street (2002), 24 (2003–04) and Óscar. Una pasión surrealista (2008).

== Film ==
=== Filmography ===
| Year | Title | Role | Notes |
|---|---|---|---|
| 1979 | Un uomo americano | Miguel Montero | – |
| 1982 | The Soldier | Unus | – |
| 1983 | The Honorary Consul | Leon | – |
| 1987 | The Sun and the Moon | David Garcia | – |
| 1987 | Repórter X | Reinaldo Ferreira | – |
| 1987 | Good Morning, Babylon | Andrea Bonnano | Movies presented at the 1987 Cannes Film Festival |
| 1988 | Love Dream | Antonio | – |
| 1988 | Terre sacrée | Mateo | – |
| 1988 | Milan noir | Tremaine | – |
| 1989 | Disamistade | Sebastiano Catte | – |
| 1989 | Les deux Fragonard | Honoré Fragonard | – |
| 1990 | Sandino | Augusto César Sandino | – |
| 1990 | A Ilha | Andrea | – |
| 1991 | A Idade Maior | Pedro | – |
| 1991 | Segno di fuoco | Luis Barreto | – |
| 1991 | El día que nací yo | Pelayo Menéndez | – |
| 1991 | El rey pasmado | Father Almeida | – |
| 1992 | Una estación de paso | Miguel | – |
| 1992 | Retrato de Família | Miguel Montenegro | Cairo International Film Festival Award for Best Actor |
| 1992 | El maestro de esgrima | Luis de Ayala | – |
| 1992 | Terra Fria | Leonardo | – |
| 1993 | Amor e Dedinhos de Pé | Francisco Frontaria | – |
| 1993 | Sombras en una batalla | José | – |
| 1993 | Amok | The Lover | – |
| 1994 | El baile de las ánimas | Antonio | – |
| 1994 | Uma Vida Normal | Miguel | – |
| 1994 | Clear and Present Danger | Col. Felix Cortez | – |
| 1994 | Only You | Giovanni | – |
| 1995 | Sostiene Pereira | Manuel | Nominated- Portuguese Golden Globe for Best Film Actor |
| 1995 | Desperado | Bucho/Cesar | Movie presented at the 1995 Cannes Film Festival |
| 1995 | Adão e Eva | Francisco | Portuguese Golden Globe for Best Film Actor |
| 1997 | Nous sommes tous encore ici | Joaquim | – |
| 1997 | Corazón loco | Emilio | – |
| 1997 | Elles | Gigi | – |
| 1997 | Tentação | Father António | Portuguese Golden Globe for Best Film Actor |
| 1998 | La Cucaracha | Jose Guerra | – |
| 1998 | The Mask of Zorro | General Santa Anna | Deleted scene |
| 1999 | On the Run | Ignácio | – |
| 1999 | No Vacancy | Reynaldo | – |
| 1999 | One Man's Hero | Cortina | – |
| 1999 | Inferno | Xana | Nominated- Portuguese Golden Globe for Best Film Actor |
| 2000 | Capitães de Abril | Gervásio | Movie presented at the 2000 Cannes Film Festival |
| 2001 | La voz de su amo | Oliveira | – |
| 2001 | Water and Salt | Marido | – |
| 2001 | Stranded | Fidel Rodrigo | – |
| 2001 | A Samba for Sherlock | Sherlock Holmes | Portuguese Golden Globe for Best Film Actor; Nominated- Grande Prêmio do Cinema Brasileiro for Best Actor |
| 2001 | Behind Enemy Lines | Admiral Piquet | – |
| 2002 | Sueurs | Noh | – |
| 2002 | Entre chiens et loups | Radman / Constantin | – |
| 2003 | Os Imortais | Roberto Alua | – |
| 2003 | Il fuggiasco | Lolo | – |
| 2004 | Yo Puta | Pierre | – |
| 2005 | Blue Sombrero | El Presidente | – |
| 2005 | Um Tiro no Escuro | Rafael | Nominated- Portuguese Golden Globe for Best Film Actor |
| 2006 | Moscow Zero | Yuri | – |
| 2006 | The Celestine Prophecy | Father Sánchez | – |
| 2006 | Thanks to Gravity | Max Landa | – |
| 2006 | 53 días de invierno | Hugo | – |
| 2007 | El corazón de la tierra | Baxter | – |
| 2007 | The Death and Life of Bobby Z | Don Huertero | – |
| 2007 | The Lovebirds | Marco Correia | – |
| 2007 | La Cucina | Michael | – |
| 2007 | Call Girl | Mouros | – |
| 2008 | Óscar. Una pasión surrealista | Óscar Domínguez | – |
| 2008 | Che: Part Two | René Barrientos | – |
| 2008 | The Burning Plain | Nick Martinez | – |
| 2008 | La Conjura de El Escorial | Escobedo | – |
| 2009 | Holy Money | Mangini | – |
| 2010 | Christopher Roth | Christopher Roth | – |
| 2010 | Backlight | Jay | – |
| 2010 | The Way | Padre José | – |
| 2011 | Fast Five | Hernan Reyes | – |
| 2011 | Mamitas | Prof. Alexander Viera | – |
| 2013 | The Gilded Cage | José Ribeiro | Nominated- Portuguese Golden Globe for Best Film Actor |
| 2013 | Robosapien: Rebooted | Esperenza | – |
| 2013 | Three-60 | Alberto Ibarguren | – |
| 2014 | 3 Holes and a Smoking Gun | Joey the Junkman | Buffalo Niagara Cinematic Award for Best Supporting Actor |
| 2014 | Atlas Shrugged Part III: Who Is John Galt? | Francisco d'Anconia | – |
| 2014 | Of Mind and Music | Dr. Alvaro Cruz | – |
| 2015 | The Duel: A Story Where Truth Is Mere Detail | Commander Vasco Moscoso | – |
| 2015 | A Date with Miss Fortune | José | – |
| 2015 | Our Brand Is Crisis | Pedro Castillo | – |
| 2015 | Diablo | Arturo | – |
| 2017 | The Hitman's Bodyguard | Jean Foucher | – |
| 2017 | Downsizing | Dr. Oswaldo Pereira | – |
| 2018 | Breaking & Exiting | Hank | – |
| 2020 | The Legion | Paetus | – |
| 2020 | Fatima | Father Ferreira | – |
| 2021 | Land of Dreams | Julian / Dr. Palmer | – |
| 2023 | Missing | Javi | |
| 2023 | Fast X | Hernan Reyes | Cameo appearance |
| 2023 | The Palace | Dr. Lima | |
| 2024 | Road House | The Sheriff | |

=== Box office grosses ===
| Year | Title | USA Gross ($) | Worldwide Gross ($) |
|---|---|---|---|
| 1982 | The Soldier | 6,328,816 | – |
| 1983 | The Honorary Consul | 5,997,566 | – |
| 1987 | Good Morning, Babylon | 183,700 | – |
| 1994 | Clear and Present Danger | 122,187,717 | 215,887,717 |
| 1994 | Only You | 20,059,210 | – |
| 1995 | Desperado | 25,405,445 | – |
| 1998 | La Cucaracha | 14,692 | – |
| 1999 | One Man's Hero | 240,067 | – |
| 2001 | Behind Enemy Lines | 58,856,790 | 91,753,202 |
| 2004 | Whore | 5,130 | – |
| 2006 | The Celestine Prophecy | 617,236 | 903,680 |
| 2007 | The Death and Life of Bobby Z | 499,300 | 912,754 |
| 2009 | The Burning Plain | 200,730 | 5,468,647 |
| 2011 | Fast Five | 207,971,445 | 596,971,445 |

== Television ==
Joaquim de Almeida has also worked on TV series, his first appearance was in Miami Vice, a season 2 episode, where he played a character named Roberto 'Nico' Arroyo. But his most notable work was on the television series 24. He made twelve appearances in season 3 as one of the main villains, named Ramon Salazar, a Mexican narcoterrorist, who runs one of the largest drug smuggling rings in Mexico, and is also involved in drugs for arms sales. He made part of the set who was nominated for the 2005 Actors Guild Award for best Outstanding Performance by an Ensemble in a Drama Series.

Almeida also made appearances in several American series such as the adventure drama Crusoe playing Santos Santana in 3 Episodes, the police procedural CSI: Miami as Joseph Trevi on the season 5 episode "Man Down", the comedy-drama Parenthood appearing in 2 episodes as Matthew Biscali and he also appear in 7 episodes of the 2005 police drama Wanted. Even doing all this works, Joaquim de Almeida doesn't like starring in TV series.

=== TV series appearances ===
| Year | Title | Role | Notes |
|---|---|---|---|
| 1985 | Miami Vice | Roberto "Nico" Arroyo | 1 Episode - 2x9: "Bought and Paid For". |
| 1996 | Dead Man's Walk | Maj. Laroche | 1 Episode - 1x3 |
| 1996–1997 | Nostromo | Col. Sotillo | Miniseries |
| 1998 | La Femme Nikita | Joaquim Armel | 1 Episode - 2x11: "Psychic Pilgrim". |
| 1999 | Camino de Santiago | Gonzalo Leyva | Miniseries |
| 2000 | Falcone | Caesar Nicoletti | 1 Episode |
| 2003 | Kingpin | Colombian Cocaine Kingpin | 1 Episode |
| 2003–2004 | 24 | Ramon Salazar | 12 Episodes Nominated- SAG Award for Outstanding Performance by an Ensemble in a Drama Series |
| 2004 | The West Wing | Carlos Carrio | 1 Episode - 5x12: "Slow News Day". |
| 2005 | Wanted | Captain Manuel Valenza | 7 Episodes |
| 2007 | CSI: Miami | Joseph Trevi | 1 Episode - 5x15: "Man Down". |
| 2008 | Crusoe | Santos Santana | 3 Episodes |
| 2010 | Vuelo IL 8714 | Hunter | Miniseries |
| 2010 | República | Henrique | Miniseries |
| 2010 | Parenthood | Matthew Biscali | 2 Episodes |
| 2011 | The Glades | Alvaro Saldivar | 1 Episode - 2x1 "Family Matters" |
| 2011 | Rosa Fogo | Horácio Gomes | 1 Episode |
| 2012 | The Mentalist | Gabriel Porchetto | 1 Episode - 4x12: "My Bloody Valentine". |
| 2012 | Missing | Antoine Lussier | 3 Episodes |
| 2012 | Revenge | Salvador Grobet | 1 Episode - 2x9 "Revelations" |
| 2012–2013 | Rouge Brazil | João da Silva | Miniseries |
| 2013 | Once Upon a Time | King Xavier | 1 Episode - 2x16: "The Miller's Daughter". |
| 2013 | Bones | Raphael Valenza | 1 Episode - 9x07: "The Nazi on the Honeymoon". |
| 2014 | Revolution | Luis Nunez | 1 Episode - 2x11: "Mis Dos Padres". |
| 2015 | Santa Bárbara | Marcelo Vidal | 1 Episode |
| 2016–2018 | Queen of the South | Don Epifanio Vargas | Main Cast- Nominated- Imagen Award for Best Actor - Television |
| 2017 | Training Day | Menjivar | 2 Episodes |
| 2018 | Elementary | Cal Medina | 1 Episode - 6x13 "Breathe" |
| 2020–present | Warrior Nun | Cardinal Duretti | 10 episodes |
| 2022 | Ganglands | Bucho | Season 2, 6 episodes (French title: Braqueurs) |

=== Made-for-television films ===
| Year | Title | Role | Notes |
|---|---|---|---|
| 1992 | Aqui D'El Rei! | Manuel | |
| 1997 | Fatima | Avelino de Almeida | |
| 1997 | L'enfant du bout du monde | Miguel Carmina | |
| 1998 | Dollar for the Dead | Friar Ramon | |
| 1999 | Vendetta | Joseph Macheca | |
| 2005 | Wanted | Capt. Manuel Valenza | |
| 2005 | Have No Fear: The Life of Pope John Paul II | Archbishop Óscar Romero | |

== Voice acting ==
Joaquim de Almeida has also provided his voice for a number of video games and animated series and films. In 1997, he appeared in Estória do Gato e da Lua , an animated short film in which he voiced The Cat. In 2004, in the Season 1 episode "Traction", of The Batman animated series, he voiced the role of the villain Bane, an elusive soldier of fortune hired by several crime lords to take out the Batman. Later in 2004, Almeida voiced a character named Mattson in the video game The Chronicles of Riddick: Escape from Butcher Bay,

In 2006, Almeida provides the voice of Hector Lopez in the 2006 sandbox-style action-adventure video game Saints Row. Hector Lopez is the current jefe of Los Carnales, a Latin-American gang. In the same year, he voiced Tai Lung from the Portuguese version of Kung Fu Panda.

=== Film ===
| Year | Title | Role | Notes |
|---|---|---|---|
| 1997 | Estória do Gato e da Lua | The Cat | Short film |
| 2002 | Demon Island | Narrator | |
| 2006 | Kung Fu Panda | Tai Lung | Portuguese-language version |
| 2013 | Despicable Me 2 | Eduardo Pérez/El Macho | Portuguese-language version |
| 2015 | Pan | Blackbeard | Portuguese-language version |
| 2016 | The Angry Birds Movie | The Mighty Eagle | Portuguese-language version |

=== Television ===
| Year | Title | Role | Notes |
|---|---|---|---|
| 2004 | The Batman | Bane | 1 Episode - 1x3 "Traction" |
| 2012 | Archer | Román Calzado | 1 Episode - 3x5 "El Contador" |

=== Video games ===
| Year | Title | Role | Notes |
|---|---|---|---|
| 2004 | The Chronicles of Riddick: Escape from Butcher Bay | Mattson | |
| 2006 | Saints Row | Hector Lopez | |
| 2015 | Deus Ex Machina 2 | Defect Police | |
