= Luc Béraud =

French director, screenwriter and actor

- Born: 30 October 1945 (age 80); La Rochelle, France
- Occupations: Director, Screenwriter, Actor
- Years active: 1969–present

Luc Béraud (born 30 October 1945) is a French director, screenwriter and actor.

== Career ==
He started as assistant director for Patrice Leconte, Jean Eustache and Alain Robbe-Grillet. He was nominated three times for the César Award for Best Original Screenplay or Adaptation.

== Filmography ==
Year	Title	Role	Box office	Notes
1969	Cinéastes de notre temps	Assistant director		TV series (1 episode) directed by Hubert Knapp & André S. Labarthe
1971	La poule	Director		Short
1971	Le laboratoire de l'angoisse	Assistant director		Short directed by Patrice Leconte
1973	The Mother and the Whore	Assistant director	$2,578,957	Directed by Jean Eustache
1973	La famille heureuse (Famille Gazul)	First Assistant Director		Short directed by Patrice Leconte
1974	Successive Slidings of Pleasure	Assistant director		Directed by Alain Robbe-Grillet
1974	Celine and Julie Go Boating	Assistant director	$1,492,222	Directed by Jacques Rivette
1974	My Little Loves	Assistant director	$923,947	Directed by Jean Eustache
1974	Nouvelles de Henry James	Director & writer		TV series (1 episode)
1974	Le jeu des preuves	Director & writer		Short
1975	Playing with Fire	Assistant director	$2,629,545	Directed by Alain Robbe-Grillet
1976	The Best Way to Walk	Assistant director & Writer	$4,410,225	Directed by Claude Miller; Nominated - César Award for Best Screenplay, Dialogue or Adaptation
1977	This Sweet Sickness	First Assistant Director & Writer	$3,988,275	Directed by Claude Miller
1977	Une sale histoire	Assistant director		Directed by Jean Eustache
1978	La tortue sur le dos	Director, writer & Producer	$254,655	
1979	Madame Sourdis	Actor		TV movie directed by Caroline Huppert
1981	Plein sud	Director & writer		
1981	Les malheurs de Sophie	Writer		Directed by Jean-Claude Brialy
1982	L'ombre sur la plage	Director		TV movie
1983	Le jeune marié	Writer	$3,208,035	Directed by Bernard Stora
1983	All About Mankiewicz	Director		Documentary
1983	Deadly Circuit	Actor	$6,876,510	Directed by Claude Miller
1983	Liberty Belle	Actor	$489,405	Directed by Pascal Kané
1983	Elle voulait faire du cinéma	Actor		TV movie directed by Caroline Huppert
1985	Sincerely Charlotte	Writer & Actor	$676,582	Directed by Caroline Huppert
1985	Strictement personnel	Writer	$436,147	Directed by Pierre Jolivet
1985	An Impudent Girl	Writer	$20,708,557	Directed by Claude Miller; Nominated - César Award for Best Original Screenplay or Adaptation
1985	Série noire	Actor		TV series (1 episode) directed by Laurent Heynemann
1987	Vent de panique	Writer		Directed by Bernard Stora
1987	Les mois d'avril sont meurtriers	Actor		Directed by Laurent Heynemann
1988	La petite amie	Director & writer	$372,480	
1988	En toute innocence	Writer	$2,229,135	Directed by Alain Jessua
1988	Deux minutes de soleil en plus	Writer		Directed by Gérard Vergez
1988	The Little Thief	Writer	$13,762,050	Directed by Claude Miller; Nominated - César Award for Best Original Screenplay or Adaptation
1990	V comme vengeance	Director		TV series (1 episode)
1991	Série noire	Actor		TV series (1 episode) directed by Caroline Huppert
1992	The Accompanist	Writer	$6,203,155	Directed by Claude Miller
1992	Neige dans le midi	Writer		TV movie directed by Michèle Ferrand-Lafaye
1993	La grande collection	Director & writer		TV series (1 episode)
1993	Le bal	Writer		TV movie directed by Jean-Louis Benoît
1994	Couchettes express	Director & writer		TV movie
1995	Pasteur, cinq années de rage	Director & writer		TV movie
1995	L'impossible Monsieur Papa	Actor		TV movie directed by Denys Granier-Deferre
1996	Crédit bonheur	Director & writer		TV movie
1996	Le fou de la tour	Director		TV movie
1996	Le marché du sport	Director		TV movie
1996	La peau du chat	Actor		TV movie directed by Jacques Otmezguine
1997	La voisine	Director & writer		TV movie
1997	La cité des alouettes	Director & writer		TV movie
2000	Les jours heureux	Director		TV movie
2001	Des croix sur la mer	Director & writer		TV movie
2001	Les p'tits gars Ladouceur	Director		TV movie
2002	Tous les chagrins se ressemblent	Director & writer		TV movie
2002	Sous bonne garde	Director		TV movie
2003	Fruits mûrs	Director		TV movie
2003	De soie et de cendre	Actor		TV movie directed by Jacques Otmezguine
2004	Les eaux troubles	Director		TV movie
2004	Une autre vie	Director		TV movie
2006	C'est arrivé dans l'escalier	Director		TV movie
2007	La promeneuse d'oiseaux	Actor		TV movie directed by Jacques Otmezguine
2007	René Bousquet ou Le grand arrangement	Actor		TV movie directed by Laurent Heynemann
2008	C'est mieux la vie quand on est grand	Director		TV movie
2008	Villa Jasmin	Writer		TV movie directed by Férid Boughedir
2008	Le sanglot des anges	Actor		TV mini-series directed by Jacques Otmezguine
2010	My Father's Guests	Writer	$5,800,000	Directed by Anne Le Ny
2010	Le Roi, l'Écureuil et la Couleuvre	Actor		TV series (1 episode) directed by Laurent Heynemann
2011	Bienvenue à Bouchon	Director & writer		TV movie
2012	Cornouaille	Writer	$3,475,941	Directed by Anne Le Ny
2013	Une femme dans la Révolution	Actor		TV mini-series directed by Jean-Daniel Verhaeghe
2019	Je ne rêve que de vous	Writer		Directed by Laurent Heynemann
