= La Dentellière =

1974 novel by Pascal Lainé

- Author: Pascal Lainé
- Translator: George Crowther
- Language: French
- Publication date: 1974
- Publication place: France
- English publication date: 1976

La Dentellière ("The Lacemaker") is a French novel by Pascal Lainé. It was awarded the Prix Goncourt (France's most prestigious literary award) in 1974. It was made into a film with Isabelle Huppert in 1977 (directed by Claude Goretta).

It was translated into English by George Crowther in 1976 as A Web of Lace and in 2006 by David Dugan. An excerpt of the 2006 translation appeared in the literary journal The Dirty Goat in 2008.

In simple, precise language, Pascal Lainé paints his character's portrait in her original setting: "She was like one of those genre paintings where the subject is captured in mid-movement. Her way, for example, of pursing hairpins in her lips as she redid her hair bun! She was The Laundress, The Water Girl, or The Lacemaker."

== Plot ==
Apple's story begins in a village in northern France. Her father has left and her mother works both as a barmaid and prostitute and they live in a noisy roadside apartment. We meet her again at age 18, living with her mother in a suburb of Paris and working at a hair salon near St. Lazare train station. At night mother and daughter watch TV or Apple reads romance novels and magazines. Her first friend in Paris is Marilyn, a 30-year-old redhead who is unsuccessfully modeling her life after a romance novel. She tries to make Apple more like herself, gets her to drink whiskey and wear makeup, but she begrudges Apple's simplicity and the friendship doesn't survive the entrance of Marilyn's next boyfriend.

Marilyn abandons Apple while the two friends are vacationing in Cabourg. Apple is left eating an ice cream at a tea shop when Aimery de Béligny shows up. Aimery is initially fascinated by Apple's simplicity. An intellectual from a respectable family, he is different from Apple in every way. Her docile sincerity charms him at first; they live together in his studio in Paris where she expresses her devotion through continuous housework. But such humble tenderness only irritates the student, who thinks the intellectual gap between them is too profound. He breaks up with her and leaves. Apple takes off her rubber gloves, puts away her cleanser and leaves without complaint. She returns to her mother's convinced that she is unworthy and ugly and she loses what interest she had in life. She stops eating and ends up in a mental hospital.

Apple is surrounded with characters who believe they know how to express themselves, while she remains mute. Her silent suffering is the central light of the book, like the candle in Vermeer's painting.
