= Tip Top (film) =

2013 film

- Film poster
- Directed by: Serge Bozon
- Written by: Odile Barski; Serge Bozon; Axelle Ropert
- Based on: Tip Top by Bill James
- Starring: Sandrine Kiberlain; Isabelle Huppert
- Cinematography: Céline Bozon
- Edited by: François Quiqueré
- Music by: Roland Wiltgen
- Distributed by: Rézo Films
- Release dates: 19 May 2013 (Cannes); 11 September 2013 (France)
- Running time: 106 minutes
- Countries: France; Belgium
- Languages: French; Arabic
- Budget: $4 million
- Box office: $625,000

Tip Top is a 2013 Franco-Belgian detective comedy film directed by Serge Bozon and starring Isabelle Huppert. The story was adapted from the novel of the same name by Bill James, under the pseudonym David Craig. It was screened in the Directors' Fortnight section of the 2013 Cannes Film Festival.

== Plot ==
Two urban female internal affairs inspectors join the police department of a small village in order to investigate the murder of an Algerian man who was an informant.

== Cast ==
- Sandrine Kiberlain as Sally Marinelli
- Isabelle Huppert as Esther Lafarge
- François Damiens as Robert Mendès
- Samy Naceri as Gérald
- Karole Rocher as Virginie
- François Négret as Nadal
- Aymen Saïdi as Younès
- Elie Lison as Rozynski
- Saïda Bekkouche as Saida Bekkouche

== See also ==
- Isabelle Huppert on screen and stage
