= Sincerely Charlotte =

1985 film

- Theatrical release poster
- Directed by: Caroline Huppert
- Written by: Caroline Huppert; Luc Béraud; Joëlle Goron
- Produced by: Adolphe Viezzi
- Starring: Isabelle Huppert
- Cinematography: Bruno de Keyzer
- Edited by: Anne Boissel
- Release date: 20 February 1985
- Running time: 92 minutes
- Country: France
- Language: French
- Box office: $680,000

Sincerely Charlotte (French: Signé Charlotte) is a 1985 French drama film directed by Caroline Huppert and starring Isabelle Huppert.

== Plot ==
After her lover has been murdered, a young singer (Isabelle Huppert) is forced to hide out at the home of her ex-boyfriend (Niels Arestrup) who is currently living there with his new love (Christine Pascal).

== Cast ==
- Isabelle Huppert - Charlotte
- Niels Arestrup - Mathieu
- Christine Pascal - Christine
- Roland Blanche - Le représentant
- Nicolas Wostrikoff - Freddy
- Josine Comellas - Jacqueline
- Bérangère Gros - Marie-Cécile
- Eduardo Manet - Emilio
- Tina Sportolaro - Nurse Chinon
- Jean-Michel Ribes - Roger
- Luc Béraud - Intern Chinon
- François Berléand - The officer PTT

== See also ==
- Isabelle Huppert on screen and stage
