= No Trifling with Love =

1977 film

- Directed by: Caroline Huppert
- Written by: Alfred de Musset
- Produced by: Jean-Serge Breton
- Starring: Isabelle Huppert
- Release date: 1 December 1977
- Country: France
- Language: French

No Trifling with Love (French: On ne badine pas avec l'amour) is a 1977 French drama film directed by Caroline Huppert. It is based on the theatrical work of Alfred de Musset of the same name.

== Plot ==
The play is set in the castle of the Baron. His 21-year-old son, Perdican, has recently finished his University education and returned to the castle, just as his cousin Camille, a beautiful 18-year-old girl, cousin and dear childhood friend, returns from the convent. The two meet after a ten-year separation in this castle so dear to their hearts, where they grew up, played, and have been loved. The Baron announces his plan to marry the two cousins.

Perdican and Camille have always loved each other, but Camille has been indoctrinated by the nuns, most of whom entered the convent because they had either lost their men to death or had been victims of unhappy love affairs. They have taught Camille never to trust men but to trust only God. Because of this Camille decides to leave Perdican and return to the convent.

Suppressing her feelings for Perdican, Camille writes a letter to one of the nuns, Louise, whose own misfortunes had prompted her to try to dissuade Camille from leaving the "safety" of the convent." Camille confides that she has done everything to make Perdican hate her, and that he is now in despair because of her marriage refusal.

During a quarrel between Dame Pluche and Blazius, Perdican accidentally finds Camille's letter. His vanity aroused, he gives in to wounded pride and decides to make Camille jealous by making advances to Camille's attractive foster sister Rosetta, an innocent peasant girl.

But Camille learns from Dame Pluche that Perdican has read the letter, and is able to divine his plan. In revenge she reveals to Rosette that Perdican is trifling with her. Rosette realizes her mistake and loses consciousness. In the last scene Camille and Perdican finally confess their love for each other, while Rosette, watching them in secret, cannot bear the pain of disillusionment and dies of emotion: "She is dead. Farewell, Perdican," concludes Camille.

== Cast ==
- Isabelle Huppert - Camille
- Didier Haudepin - Perdican
- Sabine Haudepin - Rosette
- Jean Benguigui - Bridaine
- André Julien - Le baron
- Evelyne Bouix - La choriste
- Yves Elliot - Blazius
- Monique Couturier - Dame Pluche
- Christian Pernot - Le choriste

== See also ==
- Isabelle Huppert on screen and stage
