= Bruno Guiblet =

French novelist

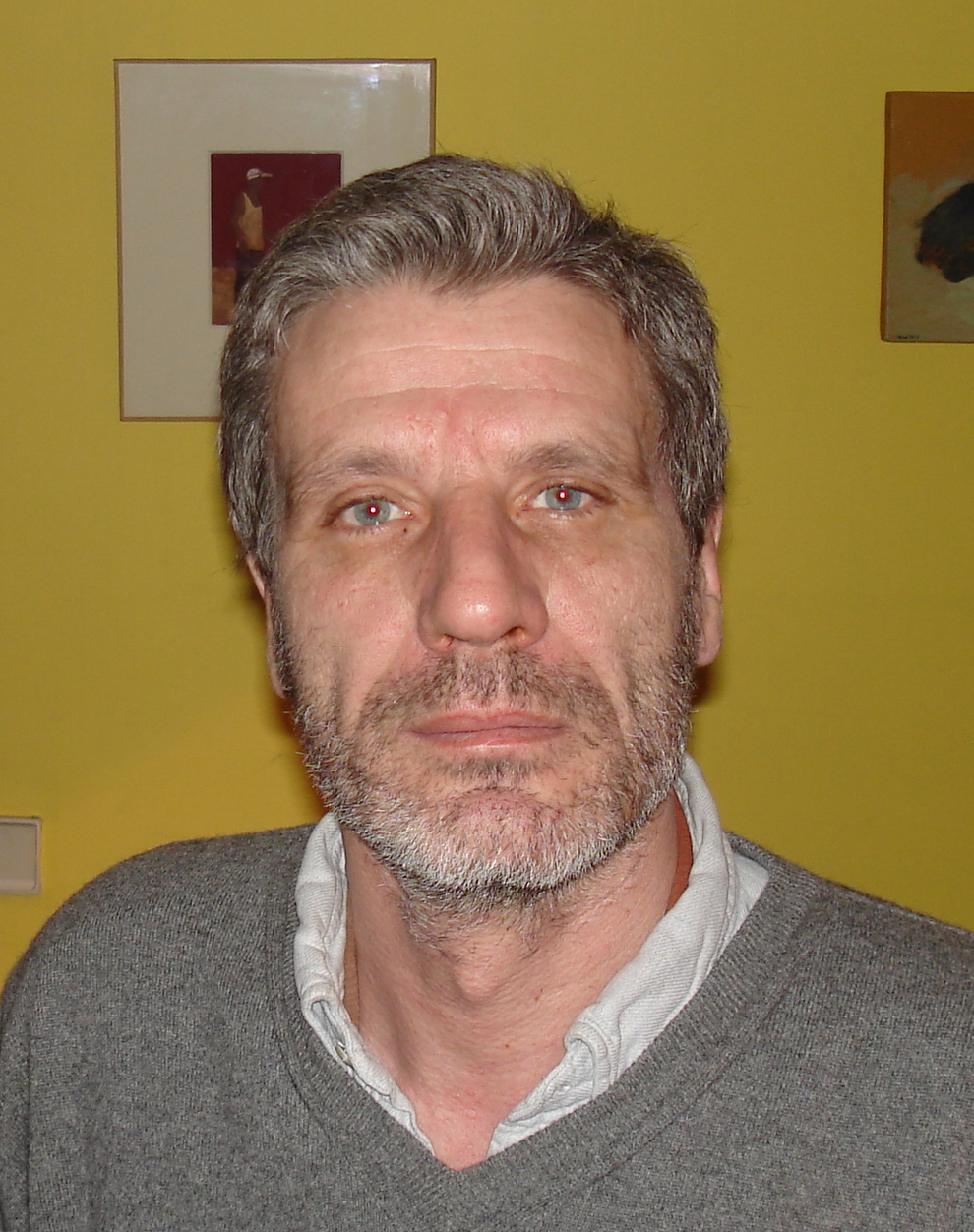
Bruno Guiblet in 2012

Bruno Guiblet (25 November 1951, Boulogne-Billancourt) is a French novelist. He grew up in Versailles, and now lives in Paris. His three novels, which include the same characters, intersect and extend.

== Filmography ==
- La Crim' (1999), Meurtre au lavage, série TV
- La Vie moderne (2000) de Laurence Ferreira Barbosa

== Novels ==
- L'Ignoble cosmonaute, 1998, NiL Éditions (ISBN 2-84111-102-4) *
- Le Muscle de l'amour, 2003, Robert Laffont (ISBN 2-221-09879-X)
- Se réveiller mort, 2011, Robert Laffont (ISBN 978-2-221-10674-7)
