= Marc de Jonge =

French actor (1949–1996)

- de Jonge as Colonel Zaysen in Rambo III
- Born: Marc Louis Maxime de Jonge; 16 February 1949; Nancy, France
- Died: 10 March 1996 (aged 47); Paris, France
- Occupation: Actor
- Years active: 1977–1996
- Spouse: Rebecca Potok

Marc Louis Maxime de Jonge (16 February 1949 – 10 March 1996) was a French actor.

== Early life and education ==
Born in Nancy, France, he studied law as his father wished, but he decided to attend Conservatory of Dramatic Art of Paris, and acquired small roles in film.

== Career ==
Despite being best known for his role as the heartless Soviet Colonel Zaysen in Rambo III, de Jonge had a long and fruitful career. He was in over 50 films, mostly productions from France. He also starred in the famous Steven Spielberg film Empire of the Sun, playing a Frenchman.

== Death ==
De Jonge forgot the keys to his Paris house on 10 March 1996. He decided to climb the building to get into his home but after arriving on the second floor, he slipped and suffered a fatal fall. He was 47 years old.

== Filmography ==
=== Film ===
- L'Aigle et la Colombe (1977) – Ludwig's Assistant
- Et vive la liberté! (1978)
- Guerres civiles en France (1978) – Les commissaire alliés (segment "Premier empire")
- Je vous ferai aimer la vie (1979)
- Au bout du bout du banc (1979)
- La bande du Rex (1980)
- La Flambeuse (1981) – De Boissouvre
- Les jocondes (1982) – Frédéric
- Mon Curé Chez les Nudistes (1982) – Oscar, le coiffeur
- Rock 'n Torah (1983) – Jess, le chauffeur de Dieu
- Rue barbare (1984) – Jo, un sbire de Hagen
- Ronde de nuit (1984) – Roland Bauchaud - un mécanicien d'extrême droite
- Les Brésiliennes du bois de Boulogne (1984) – Carmen
- Rive droite, rive gauche (1984) – Jaffré
- Flagrant désir (1986) – Larbeau
- La Femme secrète (1986) – Lamour
- Le Complexe du kangourou (1986) – Verahege
- Empire of the Sun (1986) – Frenchman
- De guerre lasse (1987) – Le capitaine SS de l'interrogatoire
- François Villon - Poetul vagabond (1987)
- Rambo III (1988) – Colonel Alexei Zaysen
- La Révolution française (1989) – Antoine-Joseph Santerre
- Street of No Return (1989) – Eddie
- Tolérance (1989) – Cabanes
- Présumé dangereux (1990) – Vigier
- Milena (1991) – Blei (uncredited)
- L'Opération Corned-Beef (1991) – Le consul Burger
- Génération oxygène (1991) – Richard Malatray
- The Secret of Sarah Tombelaine (1991) – Kerguen
- Obiettivo indiscreto (1992) – Godard
- Pas d'amour sans amour (1993) – Le gynécologue
- La Vengeance d'une blonde (1994) – Vernon
- La Cité de la peur (1994) – Le patron de Karamazov
- L'affaire (1994) – Gruskhin
- Killer Kid (1994) – Hans
- Un indien dans la ville (1994) – Rossberg
- Ainsi soient-elles (1995) – Jean
- Marie de Nazareth (1995) – Hérode
- Inner City (1995) – L'agresseur

=== Television ===
Marc de Jonge television credits
Year	Title	Role	Notes	Ref.
1985	Kane & Abel	Alfons	TV miniseries	
1986	Monte Carlo	Croupier	TV miniseries	
1987	Napoleon and Josephine: A Love Story	Robespierre	TV miniseries	
1989	First Born	Marise	TV miniseries	
1992	Counterstrike	Herr Hinkel	Episode: "The Curse of the Amber Chamber"	
1994	Fantaghirò 4	Tohor	TV movie. AKA Cave of the Golden Rose 4	
1995	L'Affaire Dreyfus	De Pellieux	TV movie. English: The Dreyfus Case	
