= Jeanne Hardeyn =

French comedian and actress

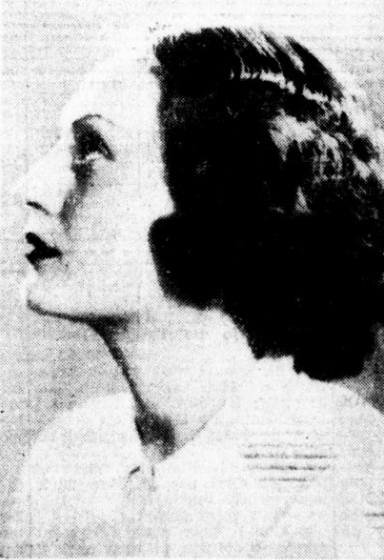
- Born: 2 March 1915; Levallois-Perret, France
- Died: 14 February 1981 (aged 65); Issy-les-Moulineaux, France
- Occupations: Actress, comedian

Jeanne Hardeyn (2 March 1915 in Levallois-Perret – 14 February 1981 in Issy-les-Moulineaux) was a French comedian and actress on film, stage, radio and television.

== Filmography ==
Year	Title	Role	Notes
1946	Cyrano de Bergerac		
1947	Monsieur Vincent	Madeleine - une soeur de charité	Uncredited
1951	La plus belle fille du monde		
1953	Un trésor de femme		
1959	Détournement de mineures		
1960	Coctail party	La secrétaire	
1962	Leviathan		
1962	Snobs!	La mère de Sarah	
1965	The Shameless Old Lady	Rose	
1971	Jupiter		
1971	Le Prussien	Marguerite	TV movie
1972		L'oeuf	Uncredited
1973	A Slightly Pregnant Man	Mme Chinon, la femme de ménage	
1974	Les guichets du Louvre		
1975	Aloïse	Une infirmière	
1977	Une fille cousue de fil blanc	Henriette	
1977	Comme la lune	La mère Pouplard	
