= Serge Bozon =

French film director, film critic and actor

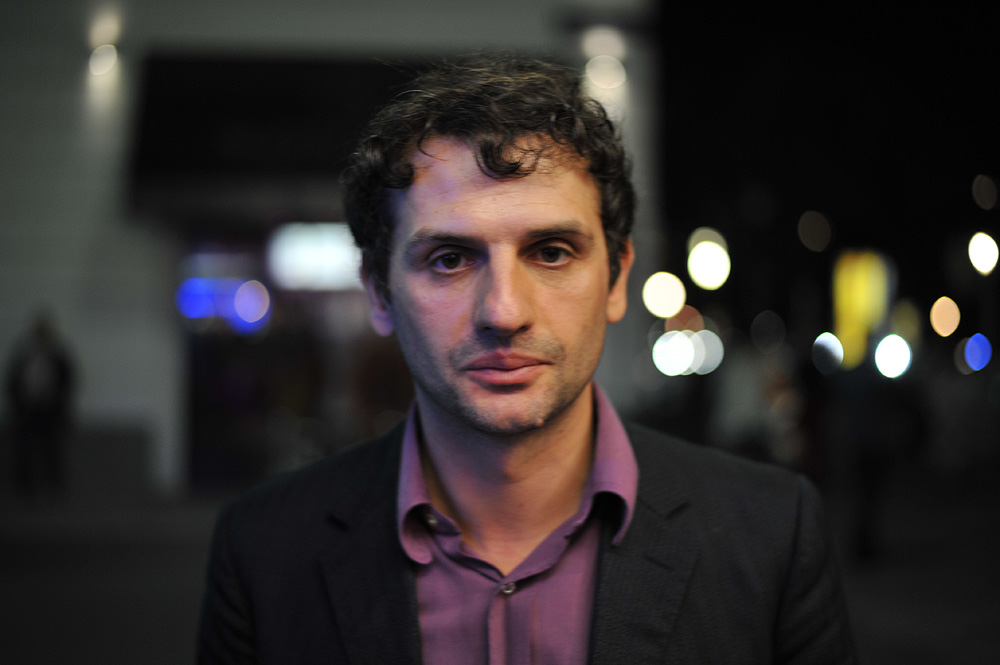
- Bozon in 2013
- Born: 8 November 1972 (age 53); Aix-en-Provence, France
- Occupations: Film director, film critic, actor
- Years active: 1998 - present
- Spouse: Axelle Ropert
- Children: 2

Serge Bozon (born 8 November 1972) is a French filmmaker and actor. His films often showcased or known for his approach to filmmaking that blends elements of genre with offbeat storytelling.

He is most known for his drama film Madame Hyde (2017), which competed for the Golden Leopard at the 70th Locarno Film Festival.

== Early career ==
Bozon was born in Aix-en-Provence, France in 1972.

After completing his baccalauréat (specializing in film) in Lyon, he moved to Paris, where he met Axelle Ropert, who would go on to write the screenplays for all his films.

He shot his first feature film, L'Amitié (1998) over the course of nine days, using personal savings and borrowed equipment.

== Private life ==
Serge Bozon was married with Axelle Ropert, the mother of his two children.

His sister, French cinematographer Céline Bozon, is a recurrent collaborator in his films.

== Filmography ==
=== Film director ===
- 1998: L'Amitié
- 2003: Mods
- 2007: La France
- 2013: Tip Top
- 2017: Madame Hyde
- 2022: Don Juan

=== Actor ===
- Je le Jure: L'expert psychiatre
- Rosalie: Le photographe
- Deux Rémi, deux: Philippe Pardon
- Hand in hand: Jean-Pierre

== Awards ==
- 2002 : Prix Léo Scheer at the festival de Belfort for Mods
- 2007 : Prix Jean Vigo for La France
