= La France (film) =

- Directed by: Serge Bozon
- Starring: Sylvie Testud; Pascal Greggory; Guillaume Verdier; François Négret; Laurent Talon; Pierre Léon; Guillaume Depardieu
- Release date: 21 November 2007
- Running time: 102 minutes
- Country: France
- Language: French
- Budget: $1.9 million
- Box office: $116,000

La France is a French film directed by Serge Bozon, released in 2007. It stars Sylvie Testud and Pascal Greggory. The film won the Prix Jean Vigo in 2007.

== Synopsis ==
During the First World War, Camille (Sylvie Testud), a young woman whose husband is away fighting at the front, receives a short letter of break-up from him. Distraught, she decides to join him, but is driven back by the rule of the time which forbids women to move around alone. She has no other recourse than to dress herself up as a man so as to be able to take to the road on foot.

== Reception ==
The film holds an approval rating of 94% based on 16 reviews on review aggregator website Rotten Tomatoes, with an average rating of 7.38/10.

Tim Palmer argues that the film is an example of recent French pop-art cinema, in which mainstream or conventional materials (here, the war film, which Bozon described in interview as the last remaining classical genre in France today) are intermingled and hybridized with intellectual or esoteric designs (such as in Bozon's approach elements of the musical, stylized or watered-down Brechtian alienation devices, deliberate fissures in the logic of the film).
