= Lolita Chammah =

French actress (born 1983)

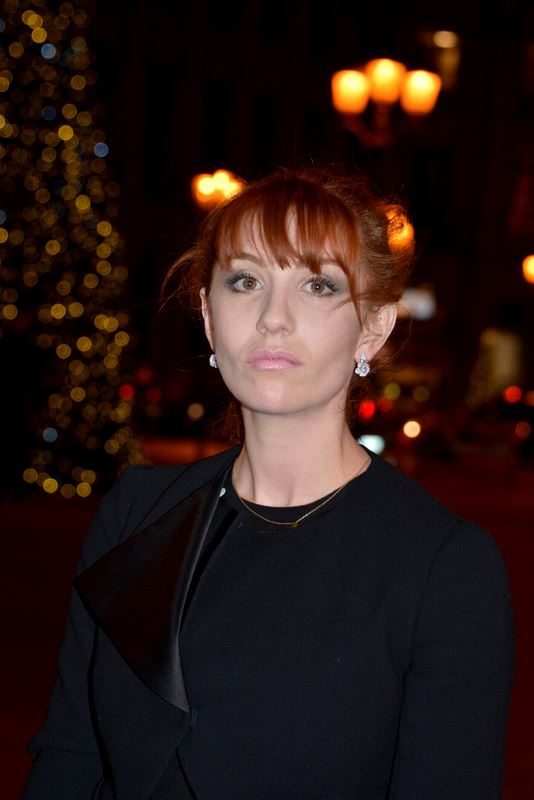
- Chammah in 2015
- Born: 1 October 1983 (age 42); Paris, France
- Occupation: Actress
- Years active: 1988–present
- Children: 1
- Parent(s): Isabelle Huppert; Ronald Chammah

Lolita Chammah (born 1 October 1983) is a French actress.

== Background ==
Chammah is the daughter of Ronald Chammah (of Syrian Jewish origin), and Isabelle Huppert. She grew up in Paris and had her first roles during childhood.

Lolita Chammah has one son.

== Career ==
In the role of the film daughter of her mother, Isabelle Huppert, she participated in Copacabana and again in 2017 in Barrage. During the first ten years of her career Chammah participated mainly in comedies, as well as some dramas.

== Selected filmography ==
Year	Title	Role	Notes
1988	Story of Women	Mouche #2	
1991	Malina	Child	
2000	Modern Life	Marguerite	
2004	Process	Maid	
2007	La Vie d'artiste	Caroline	
2010	Copacabana	Esméralda	Nominated—Lumière Award for Most Promising Actress
2012	Farewell, My Queen	Louison	
2013	Passer l'hiver	Martine	
2014	Gaby Baby Doll	Gaby	
2014	Les Gazelles	Marie 2	
2015	Anton Tchékhov 1890	Macha Tchekhov	
2015	The Art Dealer	Sophie	
2017	Barrage	Catherine	
2018	At Eternity's Gate	Girl on the Road	
2022	Caravaggio's Shadow	Anna Bianchini	
2023	Transatlantic	Lorene Letoret	TV Series
2023	Consent	Best friend of Vanessa's mother	
