= Jean L'Hôte =

French screenwriter

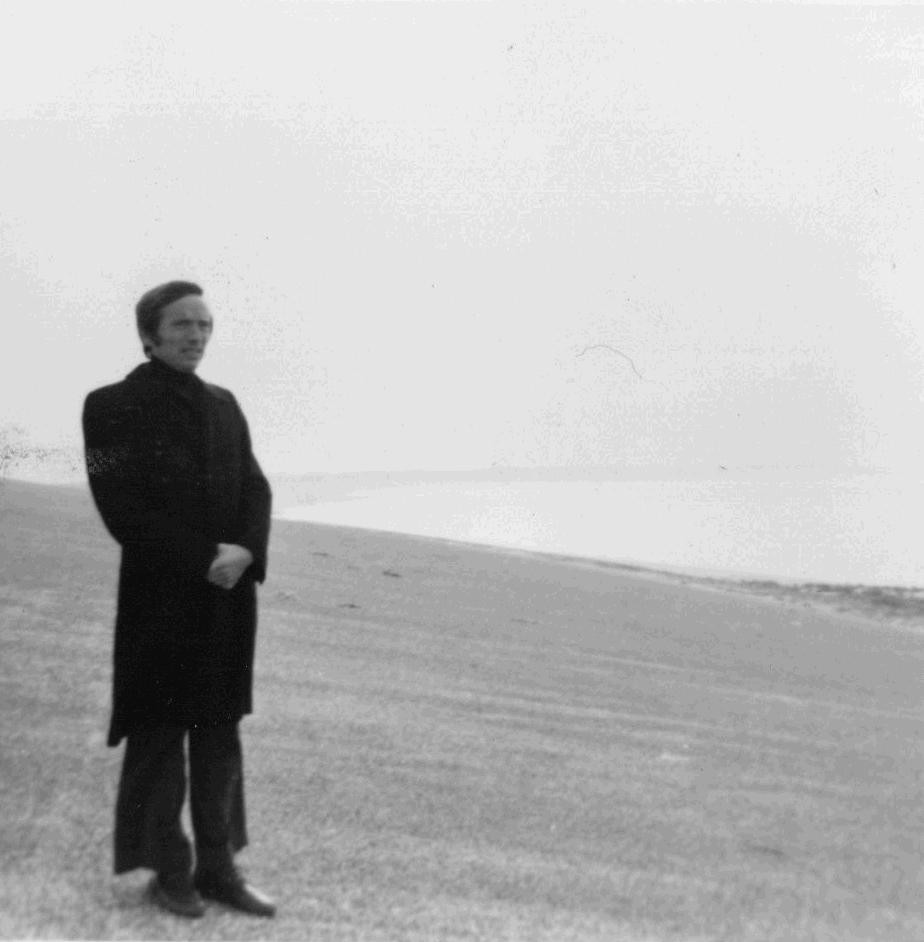
- Born: 13 January 1929; Mignéville, France
- Died: 28 April 1985 (aged 56); Nancy, France
- Occupations: Screenwriter; Film director
- Years active: 1958-1985

Jean L'Hôte (13 January 1929 – 28 April 1985) was a French screenwriter and film director. He worked on 21 films between 1958 and 1985.

== Selected filmography ==
- Mon Oncle (1958)
- Le Prussien (1971)
