= Michael H – Profession: Director =

2013 television film

- Written by: Yves Montmayeur
- Directed by: Yves Montmayeur
- Country of origin: Austria; France
- Original languages: German; French

Production
- Running time: 92 minutes

Original release
- Release: 17 February 2013

Michael H – Profession: Director (German: Michael Haneke – Porträt eines Film-Handwerkers) is a 2013 documentary film directed by Yves Montmayeur about the Austrian film director Michael Haneke.

== Cast ==
- Juliette Binoche as Herself
- Béatrice Dalle as Herself
- Michael Haneke as Himself
- Isabelle Huppert as Herself
- Susanne Lothar as Herself
- Emmanuelle Riva as Herself
- Jean-Louis Trintignant as Himself
