= La Flambeuse =

1981 French drama film

La Flambleuse is a 1981 French drama film directed by Rachel Weinberg. It tells the story of a woman hooked to gambling who begins neglecting her husband and children.

== Plot ==
Louise (Léa Massari) is married to Henri, an architect (Gérard Blain). She has just moved with her family into a modern apartment building in a rapidly changing corner of Paris's 14th arrondissement. Having recently quit her modest secretarial job, she tries, at her husband's suggestion, to fill her days with cultural activities, but quickly grows restless.

One afternoon, she wanders into a small neighbourhood café and discovers a lively crowd of endearing misfits, all drawn to games of chance. Among them is the magnetic "Chevalier" (Laurent Terzieff), who teaches her how to play dice and poker. What begins as casual curiosity soon turns into a dangerous fascination. Caught up in the thrill of gambling, Louise finds herself in financial trouble, and her obsession starts to unravel both her marriage and Henri's already faltering career.

== Cast ==
- Lea Massari: Louise
- Laurent Terzieff: Le Chevalier
- Gérard Blain: Henri
- Évelyne Dress: Clémentine
- Didier Sauvegrain: Maxence
- Gabriel Jabbour: the professor
- Claude Brosset: the Hungarian
- Pierre Saintons: the postman
- Rudolf Monori: Xavier
- Jacques Serres: Loulou
- Gérard Cuvier: the café owner
- Nicolas Chesnay: Benoît
- Vincent Blanchet: Jean-Pierre
- Jean-Marie Marguet: Manetto
- Florence Blot: Adélaïde
- Roland Timsit: Jean-Luc
- Maurice Rollet: the surgeon
- Marc de Jonge: De Boissouvre
