= Le Prussien =

1971 film

- Written by: Jean L'Hôte
- Directed by: Jean L'Hôte
- Starring: Edmond Beauchamp
- Country of origin: France
- Original language: French

Production
- Cinematography: Christian Pétard

Original release
- Release: 29 November 1971

Le Prussien is a 1971 French made-for-television film directed by Jean L'Hôte and starring Edmond Beauchamp. It is Isabelle Huppert's film debut.

== Cast ==
- Edmond Beauchamp as Le 'Prussien'
- Françoise Lugagne as Lucie
- Alfred Adam as Victor
- Jacques Rispal as Auguste
- Denise Bailly as Madeleine
- Jeanne Hardeyn as Marguerite
- Mélanie Brévan as Marie-Thérèse
- Isabelle Huppert as Elisabeth
- Freddy Schluck as Jules
- Marc Chapiteau as Paul
- Max Doria as Alfred
- Andrée Tainsy as Yvonne
- Alexandre Rignault as Le notaire
- Jacques Maginot as Le fossoyeur

== See also ==
- Isabelle Huppert on screen and stage
