= Milan noir =

1987 film

- Directed by: Ronald Chammah
- Written by: Catherine Breillat; Michel Butel; Ronald Chammah
- Produced by: Eric Dussart
- Starring: Isabelle Huppert
- Cinematography: Willy Kurant
- Edited by: Geneviève Winding
- Music by: Michel Portal
- Distributed by: Capital Cinema
- Release date: 1987
- Running time: 90 minutes
- Country: France
- Language: French

Milan noir is a 1987 French thriller film directed by Ronald Chammah and starring Isabelle Huppert.

== Cast ==
- Isabelle Huppert as Sarah
- Joaquim de Almeida as Tremaine
- David Warrilow as Moran
- Jean Benguigui as De Giorgi
- Hanns Zischler as Hardy
- Maria Monti as Bianca
- Georges Wod (credited as Georges Wod-Wodzicki) as Camellieri
- Emma Campbell as Emma
- Sasha Wuliecewitch as Zuto
- Giancarlo Garbelli as Angelo
- Francesco Firpo as Ravenne

== See also ==
- Isabelle Huppert on screen and stage
