= The Lacemaker =

1977 film

- Film poster
- Directed by: Claude Goretta
- Screenplay by: Claude Goretta; Pascal Lainé
- Based on: La Dentellière by Pascal Lainé
- Produced by: Lise Fayolle; Yves Gasser
- Starring: Isabelle Huppert; Yves Beneyton
- Cinematography: Jean Boffety
- Edited by: Joële Van Effenterre
- Music by: Pierre Jansen
- Distributed by: Gaumont Distribution
- Release date: 25 May 1977
- Running time: 107 minutes
- Country: France
- Language: French

The Lacemaker (French: La Dentellière) is a 1977 French drama film directed by Claude Goretta and starring Isabelle Huppert and Yves Beneyton. It is based on the 1974 Prix Goncourt winning novel La Dentellière by Pascal Lainé.

== Plot ==
In Paris, the shy and virginal Béatrice (known as "Pomme") lives with her mother and works in a hairdressing salon, where her only friend is the lively Marylène. Left by her lover, Marylène suggests that the two girls take a holiday by the sea at Cabourg. There Marylène soon goes off with a new man, leaving Béatrice on her own.

Befriended by the shy student François, the two become lovers and Béatrice moves into his room in Paris. Though he introduces her to his well-off parents and his intellectual friends, she is unable to mix in their worlds. Her deep reserve begins to annoy him and they split up. Losing interest in life, she ends up in a mental hospital.

Full of remorse, François visits her but she wants nothing: she has found a quiet place that suits her inwardness. In her silent anonymity, she is like the unknown girls in paintings such as Vermeer's The Lacemaker.

== Cast ==
- Isabelle Huppert as Pomme
- Yves Beneyton as François
- Florence Giorgetti as Marylène
- Annemarie Düringer as Pomme's mother (as Anne-Marie Düringer)
- Renate Schroeter as Marianne (as Renata Schroeter)
- Monique Chaumette as the mother of François
- Jean Obé as the father of François
- Christian Baltauss as Gérard, partner of Marianne
- Sabine Azéma as Corinne (as Sabine Azema)

== Reception ==
On review aggregator website Rotten Tomatoes, the film holds an approval rating of 86% based on 7 reviews, with an average rating of 8.7/10.

== Awards and nominations ==
- BAFTA Awards (UK)
  - Won: Most Promising Newcomer to Leading Film Roles (Isabelle Huppert)
- 1977 Cannes Film Festival (France)
  - Won Prize of the Ecumenical Jury (Claude Goretta; tied with J.A. Martin photographe)
  - Nominated: Golden Palm (Claude Goretta)
- César Awards (France)
  - Nominated: Best Actress – Leading Role (Isabelle Huppert)
  - Nominated: Best Actress – Supporting Role (Florence Giorgetti)
  - Nominated: Best Film
- David di Donatello Awards (Italy)
  - Won: Best Foreign Actress (Isabelle Huppert)

== See also ==
- List of Isabelle Huppert performances
