= Madame Hyde =

2017 film

- Film poster
- Directed by: Serge Bozon
- Written by: Serge Bozon
- Starring: Isabelle Huppert
- Release dates: 6 August 2017 (Locarno); 28 March 2018 (France)
- Running time: 95 minutes
- Country: France
- Language: French

Madame Hyde is a 2017 French drama film directed by Serge Bozon. It was screened in the International Competition section of the 2017 Locarno Film Festival. Drawing on the 1886 novella Strange Case of Dr Jekyll and Mr Hyde by Robert Louis Stevenson, it tells the story of a struggling school teacher who is suddenly imbued with new powers. By day she becomes a success in her job, but by night she sinks into a horror of mayhem and murder.

== Plot ==
Madame Géquil teaches physics in an inner-city secondary school. Her class is mostly rough youths of foreign ancestry who show little respect for a small mature Frenchwoman. Her husband and her headmaster are supportive, but doubt she has the strength to carry on. A particular difficulty she faces is a boy called Malik, crippled from birth and bright, who tries to emulate the class toughs by being disruptive. Counselling him on his own, she gets him to see that his innate brain power will compensate for his absence of bodily power and will take him further than his no-hope classmates.

While she is working alone one evening in the laboratory, it is struck by lightning. When she recovers from the shock she is transformed, for she has acquired a new inner power. It gives her new confidence by day: winning the attention of her class, involving them in experiments, getting them into intelligent discussions, and passing the annual inspection with top marks. But at night she becomes Madame Hyde, and the results are horrifying. She kills the neighbour's dogs, she kills a boy in her class who is bullying Malik, and finally she severely injures the disabled Malik in whom she had invested so much effort. The police take her away, while Malik, once released from hospital, finds success at another school.

== Cast ==
- Isabelle Huppert as Marie Géquil
- Romain Duris as her headmaster
- José Garcia as Pierre Géquil, the husband
- Patricia Barzyk as the neighbour
- Adda Senani as Malik

== Reception ==
On review aggregator website Rotten Tomatoes, the film has an approval rating of 60% based on 30 reviews, and an average rating of 6.1/10. On Metacritic, the film has a weighted average score of 60 out of 100, based on 15 critics, indicating "mixed or average reviews".

== See also ==
- Isabelle Huppert on screen and stage
