= Rachel Weinberg =

French film director (1928–2018)

- Born: 25 October 1928; Roanne, Loire, France
- Died: 26 November 2018 (aged 90); Fontainebleau, France
- Occupations: Film director, screenwriter, actress

Rachel Guzy (25 October 1928 – 26 November 2018), better known as Rachel Weinberg, was a French film director, screenwriter and actress,

Weinberg was born in Roanne, Loire, on 25 October 1928 and died on 26 November 2018, at the age of 90.

== Filmography ==
Director

- 1971 : Pic et pic et colegram with Monique Chaumette, Jean-Paul Tribout and Henri Garcin
- 1974 : L'Ampélopède with Isabelle Huppert and Jean Pignol (also screenwriter)
- 1981 : La Flambeuse with Lea Massari, Laurent Terzieff, Didier Sauvegrain, Claude Brosset and Gérard Blain (also screenwriter)

Actress

- 1973 : Monsieur Émilien est mort, telefilm directed by Jean Pignol with Jean-Roger Caussimon, Françoise Seigner and Roger Souza
