= Pascal Lainé =

French academic, novelist and writer (1942–2024)

Pascal Lainé (10 May 1942 – 30 December 2024) was a French academic, novelist and writer. He was born in Anet, Eure-et-Loir. He was awarded both the Prix Médicis (1971 for l'Irrévolution) and the Goncourt (1974 for La Dentellière), Pascal Lainé has published over 20 novels and has written for television, theatre, and film.

== Life and career ==
While recovering from childhood illnesses, Lainé discovered novelists Alexandre Dumas, père and Victor Hugo, aspiring to their kind of voluminous writing, but in school he focused on philosophy and history, becoming an avid student of Immanuel Kant, Maurice Merleau-Ponty, and Martin Heidegger. He was also drawn to Marxism (both by conviction and from a desire to rile his parents) and he chose Russian as his second foreign language, permitting him to read Anton Chekhov and Fyodor Dostoyevsky in the original.

Lainé studied philosophy at l'École normale supérieure de Saint-Cloud and began his career as a teacher first at the Lycée technique de Saint-Quentin and later at the Lycée Louis-le-Grand in Paris. He then became a professor in 1974 at the Institut universitaire de technologie in Villetaneuse. He served as an administrator at the Société des auteurs et compositeurs dramatiques (SACD).

With Rimbaud, he discovered the "fireworks" of poetry, and in Mallarmé he discovered the pleasure of deciphering a text and studying its structure. He was also fascinated by Witold Gombrowicz: "I felt with this joker, this aristocratic Rabelais an instant kinship. He taught me that a writer gives up his homeland and is always a foreigner wherever he finds himself."

Lainé died in Paris on 30 December 2024, at the age of 82.

== Bibliography ==
- B comme Barrabas, Éditions Gallimard, 1967
- L'Irrévolution (novel), Gallimard, 1971 – Prix Médicis
- La Dentellière (novel), Gallimard, 1974 – Prix Goncourt
- Si on partait (novel), Gallimard, 1978
- L'Eau du miroir (novel), Mercure de France, 1979
- Tendres cousines (novel), Gallimard, 1979
- Terres des ombres (novel), Gallimard, 1982
- Les Petites Egarées (novel), 1988
- Dialogues du désir (novel), 1992
- L'Incertaine (novel), 1993
- Le Commerce des apparences (novel), 1997
- Anaïs nue (novel), 1999
- Derniers jours avant fermeture (novel), 2001
- Capitaine Bringuier (play)
- Monsieur vous oubliez votre cadavre
- Le mystère de la Tour Eiffel (novel), 2005
- Un clou chasse l'autre ou La vie d'artiste (essay), Punctum editions, 2006
