= Copacabana (2010 film) =

2010 film

- Film poster
- Directed by: Marc Fitoussi
- Written by: Marc Fitoussi
- Produced by: Caroline Bonmarchand; Bert Hamelinck
- Starring: Isabelle Huppert; Aure Atika; Lolita Chammah
- Cinematography: Hélène Louvart
- Edited by: Martine Giordano
- Music by: Tim Gane; Sean O'Hagan
- Distributed by: Mars Distribution
- Release date: 7 July 2010
- Running time: 107 minutes
- Country: France
- Language: French
- Budget: $4 million
- Box office: $792.000

Copacabana is a 2010 French comedy film directed by Marc Fitoussi and starring Isabelle Huppert.

== Cast ==
- Isabelle Huppert as Babou
- Aure Atika as Lydie
- Lolita Chammah as Esméralda
- Guillaume Gouix as Kurt
- Noémie Lvovsky as Suzanne
- Luis Rego as Patrice

== See also ==
- Isabelle Huppert on screen and stage
