= Caroline Huppert =

French film director

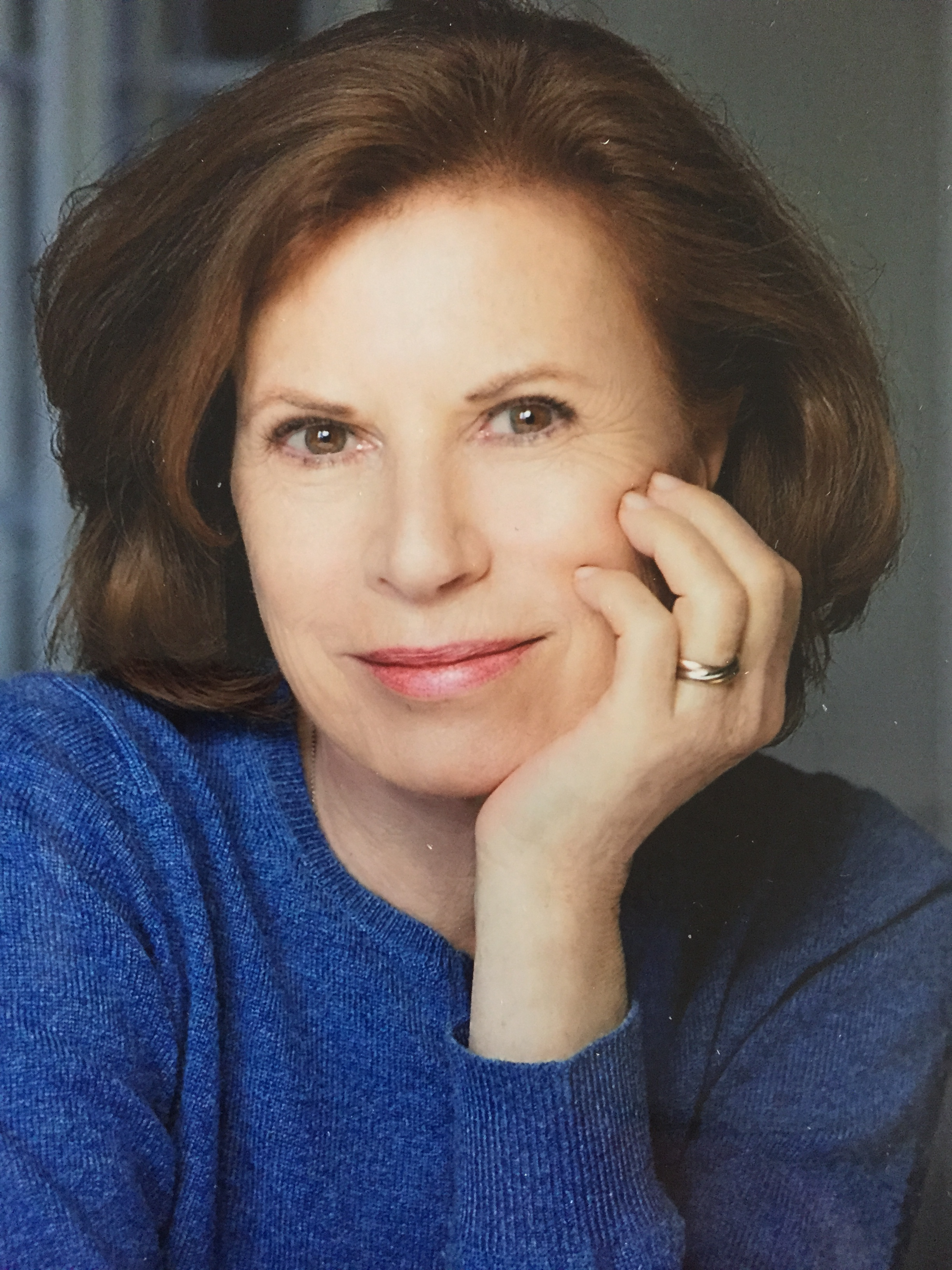
- Born: 28 October 1950 (age 76); Paris, France
- Occupations: Film director Screenwriter
- Years active: 1973–present
- Spouse: Laurent Heynemann
- Relatives: Isabelle Huppert (sister)

Caroline Huppert (French: [kaʁɔlin ypɛʁ]; born 28 October 1950) is a French film director and screenwriter. She is the sister of French actress Isabelle Huppert and has directed more than 30 films since 1977.

== Early life and career ==
Caroline Huppert was born in the 16th arrondissement of Paris, the daughter of Annick (née Beau; 1914–1990), an English language teacher, and Raymond Huppert (1914–2003), a safe manufacturer. She has a brother and three sisters, including French actress Isabelle Huppert. She was raised in Ville-d'Avray. Her father was Jewish; his Jewish family is from Eperjes, Austria-Hungary (now Prešov) and Alsace-Lorraine. Huppert was raised in her mother's Catholic faith. On her mother's side, she is a great-granddaughter of one of the Callot Soeurs.

== Selected filmography ==
- No Trifling with Love (1977)
- Birgitt Haas Must Be Killed (1981)
- Sincerely Charlotte (1985)
- Répercussions (2008) TV Movie with Sarah Grappin and Eric Savin
