= Laurence Ferreira Barbosa =

French film director

- Born: 1958 (age 67–68); Versailles, France
- Occupations: Film director Screenwriter
- Years active: 1983-present

Laurence Ferreira Barbosa (born 1958) is a French film director and screenwriter. She has directed eleven films since 1983.

== Selected filmography ==
- Modern Life (2000)
- Motus (TV film) (2003)
- Ordo (2004)
- Non (Short film) (2007)
- Dix films pour en parler (Short film) (2007)
- Dying or Feeling Better (2008)
