= L'Ampélopède =

1974 film

- Directed by: Rachel Weinberg
- Written by: Rachel Weinberg
- Produced by: Jean-Marie Marguet
- Starring: Isabelle Huppert
- Cinematography: Claude Bécognée
- Edited by: Philippe Delesalle
- Music by: Carol Escoffier
- Production company: Nanou Film
- Release date: 25 September 1974
- Running time: 83 minutes
- Country: France
- Language: French

L'Ampélopède is a 1974 French fantasy film directed by Rachel Weinberg and starring Isabelle Huppert.

== Plot ==
A young woman resents the negative effects of urbanisation in Sainte-Montaine, the village in Sologne where she lives. She makes up a fantastic strange creature, the Ampélopède, which dwells in a forest.

== Cast ==
- Isabelle Huppert - the narrator
- Patricia Pierangeli - Marie-Thé
- Jean-Marie Marguet - the Ampélopède
- Jean Pignol - Monsieur Pignolet
- Philippe Lehembre - Docteur Saxe
- Louise Dhour - the witch
- Valentine Pratz - Valentine
- Louise Rioton - the lady
- Claude Cernay - the waiter
- Robert Desrouets
- Camille Desmoulins

== Reception ==
A review in Le Monde wrote: "Rachel Weinberg mixes fictional and reportage styles; she brings together and organizes different elements of reality; she places in a present where the villagers can no longer act, but simply speak, rehashing memories and traditions, the ironic and bitterly burlesque images of a possible future."
