= Modern Life (film) =

2000 film

- Directed by: Laurence Ferreira Barbosa
- Written by: Laurence Ferreira Barbosa; Bruno Guiblet; Yvonne Kerouedan
- Produced by: Paulo Branco
- Starring: Isabelle Huppert
- Cinematography: Christophe Beaucarne
- Edited by: Yann Dedet
- Release date: 1 March 2000
- Running time: 123 minutes
- Country: France
- Language: French
- Budget: $3.4 million
- Box office: $470,000

Modern Life (French: La Vie moderne) is a 2000 French drama film directed by Laurence Ferreira Barbosa and starring Isabelle Huppert.

== Cast ==
- Isabelle Huppert - Claire
- Frédéric Pierrot - Jacques
- Lolita Chammah - Marguerite
- Juliette Andréa - Eva
- Jean-Pierre Gos - Marguerite's father
- Robert Kramer - Andy Hellman
- Aurélien Recoing - Georges
- Marc Rioufol - Leon
- Teo Saavedra - Herminio
- Jérémie Korenfeld - Pierre François
- Jacques Spiesser - Désormières
- Blandine Paulet - Sandra
- Annie Mercier - Eliane
- Jean-Baptiste Montagut - Handsome neighbor
- Cécile Richard - Gertrude
- Nathalie Nell - Annick Renard
- Philippe Rebbot - Threatening man
