= Isabelle Huppert =

French actress (born 1953)

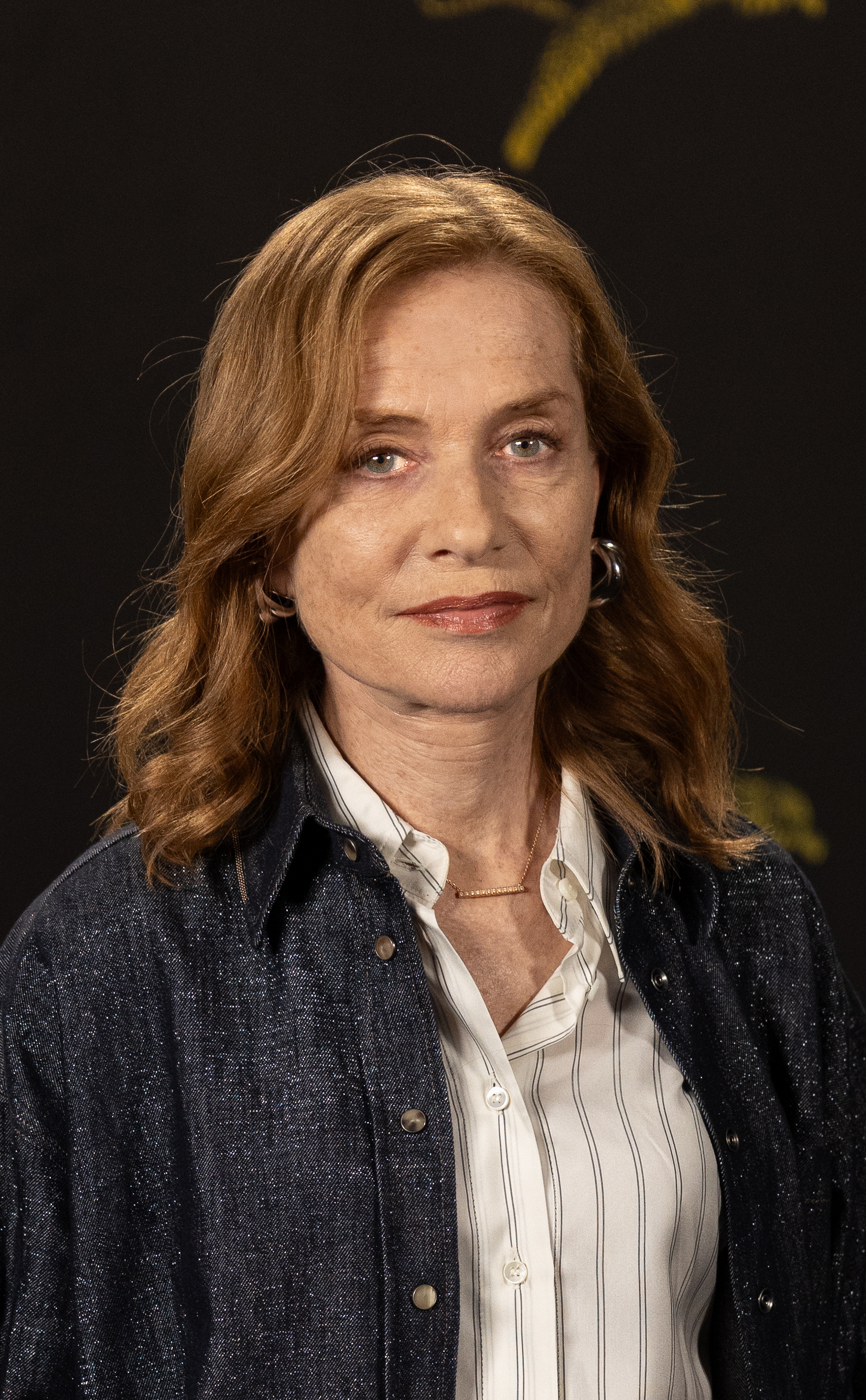
- Huppert in 2026
- Born: Isabelle Anne Madeleine Huppert; 16 March 1953 (age 73); Paris, France
- Education: Conservatoire à rayonnement régional de Versailles; Institut national des langues et civilisations orientales (INALCO); Conservatoire national supérieur d'art dramatique (CNSAD)
- Occupation: Actress
- Years active: 1971–present
- Works: Performances
- Partner(s): Daniel Toscan du Plantier (former); Ronald Chammah (1982–present)
- Children: 3, including Lolita Chammah
- Relatives: Caroline Huppert (sister)
- Awards: Full list

Isabelle Anne Madeleine Huppert (French: [izabɛl ypɛʁ]; born 16 March 1953) is a French actress who has appeared in more than 120 feature films, mostly in starring roles. Regarded as one of the most respected actresses in French cinema, she has appeared in films directed by Claude Chabrol, Jean-Luc Godard and Michael Haneke. She has also starred in numerous stage productions, in Paris and around the world.

With 17 nominations and two wins, Huppert is the most nominated actress at the César Awards. She has also received numerous accolades, such as five Lumière Awards, a BAFTA Award, three European Film Awards, two Berlin International Film Festival, three Cannes Film Festival, and Venice Film Festival honours, a Golden Globe Award, and an Academy Award nomination. In 2020, The New York Times named her the greatest actress of the 21st century.

Huppert's first César Award nomination was for Best Supporting Actress in Aloïse (1975) and she won Best Actress for La Cérémonie (1995) and Elle (2016). For The Lacemaker (1977) she won the BAFTA Award for Most Promising Newcomer. She went on to win two Cannes Film Festival Awards for Best Actress for Violette Nozière (1978) and The Piano Teacher (2001), as well as the Volpi Cup for Best Actress twice for Story of Women (1988) and La Cérémonie. Huppert's other films in France include Loulou (1980), La Séparation (1994), 8 Women (2002), Gabrielle (2005), Amour (2012), Things to Come (2016), and Happy End (2017).

For her performance in Elle, Huppert was nominated for the Academy Award for Best Actress; she also won several critics' awards and a Golden Globe and Independent Spirit Award. Huppert is among international cinema's most prolific actresses with her best known English-language films including Heaven's Gate (1980), The Bedroom Window (1987), Amateur (1994), I Heart Huckabees (2004), The Disappearance of Eleanor Rigby (2013), Louder Than Bombs (2015), Greta (2018), Frankie (2019), and Mrs. Harris Goes to Paris (2022).

Also a prolific stage actress, Huppert is the most nominated actress for the Molière Award, with nine nominations; she received an honorary award in 2017. In the same year, she was awarded the Europe Theatre Prize. She made her London stage debut in the title role of the play Mary Stuart in 1996, and her New York stage debut in a 2005 production of 4.48 Psychosis. Huppert's recent credits include in Heiner Müller's Quartett (2009) in New York, Sydney Theater Company's The Maids (2014), and Florian Zeller's The Mother (2019) in New York City.

== Early life and education ==
Huppert was born on 16 March 1953, (Note: Huppert formerly gave her date of birth as 16 March 1955, shaving two years off her age. Asked about the discrepancy, she told an interviewer "Don't go thinking that I'll help you out with that one.") in the 16th arrondissement of Paris, the daughter of Annick (née Beau; 1914–1990), an English-language teacher, and Raymond Huppert (1914–2003), a safe manufacturer. The youngest child, she has a brother and three sisters, including filmmaker Caroline Huppert. She was raised in Ville-d'Avray. Her father was Jewish; his family was from Eperjes, Kingdom of Hungary, Austro-Hungarian Empire (now Prešov, Slovakia) and Alsace-Lorraine. Huppert was raised in her mother's Catholic faith. On her mother's side, she is a great-granddaughter of one of the Callot Soeurs.

In 1968, aged 15, Huppert enrolled at the Conservatoire à rayonnement régional de Versailles, where she won a prize for her acting. She also attended the Conservatoire national supérieur d'art dramatique (CNSAD).

== Career ==
=== 1970–1979: Early roles and breakthrough ===
Huppert made her television debut in 1971 with Le Prussien, and her feature film debut in Nina Companeez's romantic comedy Faustine et le Bel Été (1972). The film was shown Out of Competition at the 1972 Cannes Film Festival. Also that year she played Annie Smith in Alain Levent's adventure film The Bar at the Crossing and Marite in Claude Sautet's romance drama César and Rosalie with the former premiering at the Berlin International Film Festival. She made her theatre debut playing Lucile in Les Précieuses ridicules at the Comédie-Française in Paris from 1971 to 1972. Later that year she acted in A Hunger Artist at National Theatre Daniel Sorano in Paris followed by a run at the Shiraz Arts Festival.

In 1974 she acted in Alain Robbe-Grillet's art film Successive Slidings of Pleasure and Rachel Weinberg's fantasy film L'Ampélopède. She also gained notoriety for her later appearance as Jacqueline in Bertrand Blier's controversial sex comedy Les Valseuses (1974). Huppert acted alongside Gérard Depardieu and Jeanne Moreau. Vincent Canby of The New York Times panned the film writing, "It's not very invigorating to see so much talent squandered on such foolish mixed-up romanticism." The role made her increasingly recognised by the public.

The following year she acted in Yves Boisset's drama The Common Man (1975) which won the Silver Bear Grand Jury Prize at the Berlin International Film Festival. That same year starred in the American action thriller Rosebud (1975) directed by Otto Preminger. She acted opposite Peter O'Toole and Richard Attenborough. She also starred in the title role in the drama film Aloïse which premiered at the Cannes Film Festival. In 1976 she acted in Bertrand Tavernier's The Judge and the Assassin and Christine Lipinska's I Am Pierre Riviere.

Her international breakthrough came with her performance in Claude Goretta's La Dentelliere (1977), for which she won a BAFTA Award for Most Promising Newcomer to Leading Film Roles. Critic Roger Ebert praised her performance writing, "The movie’s performances are wonderfully subtle. Huppert, as Pomme, is good at the very difficult task of projecting the inner feelings of a character whose whole personality is based on the concealment of feeling". The following year she won acclaim playing the title role Claude Chabrol's crime drama Violette Nozière (1978) winning the Cannes Film Festival Award for Best Actress. It was the first of seven collaborations she would have with director Chabrol. Ebert wrote, "Huppert's performance, which is so assured, so complex it's hard to believe she worked this transformation in character after The Lacemaker.

=== 1980–1999: Established actress ===
After a five-year absence from American films, Huppert starred in Michael Cimino's Heaven's Gate (1980), which opened to poor reviews and was a box office failure; decades later, the film has been reassessed, with some critics considering it an overlooked masterpiece. Also that year she starred in Maurice Pialat's Loulou (1980) where she reunited with Gérard Depardieu. Janet Maslin of The New York Times praised her performance writing, "Miss Huppert does a fine job of seeming exotic, vague, dazzling and also, somehow, unremarkable - all of this at the same time. The performances are much sharper than the film is as a whole." Also in 1980 she acted in Jean-Luc Godard's Sauve qui peut (la vie) (1980).

Throughout the 1980s, Huppert continued to explore enigmatic and emotionally distant characters, most notably in Coup de Torchon (1983) directed by Bertrand Tavernier, adapted from Jim Thompson's pulp novel Pop. 1280. Huppert earned a César Award for Best Actress nomination for her performance. She acted in Curtis Hanson's neo-noir thriller The Bedroom Window (1987) acting opposite Steve Guttenberg and Elizabeth McGovern. She won acclaim for her role in Claude Chabrol's Une Affaire de Femmes (1988).

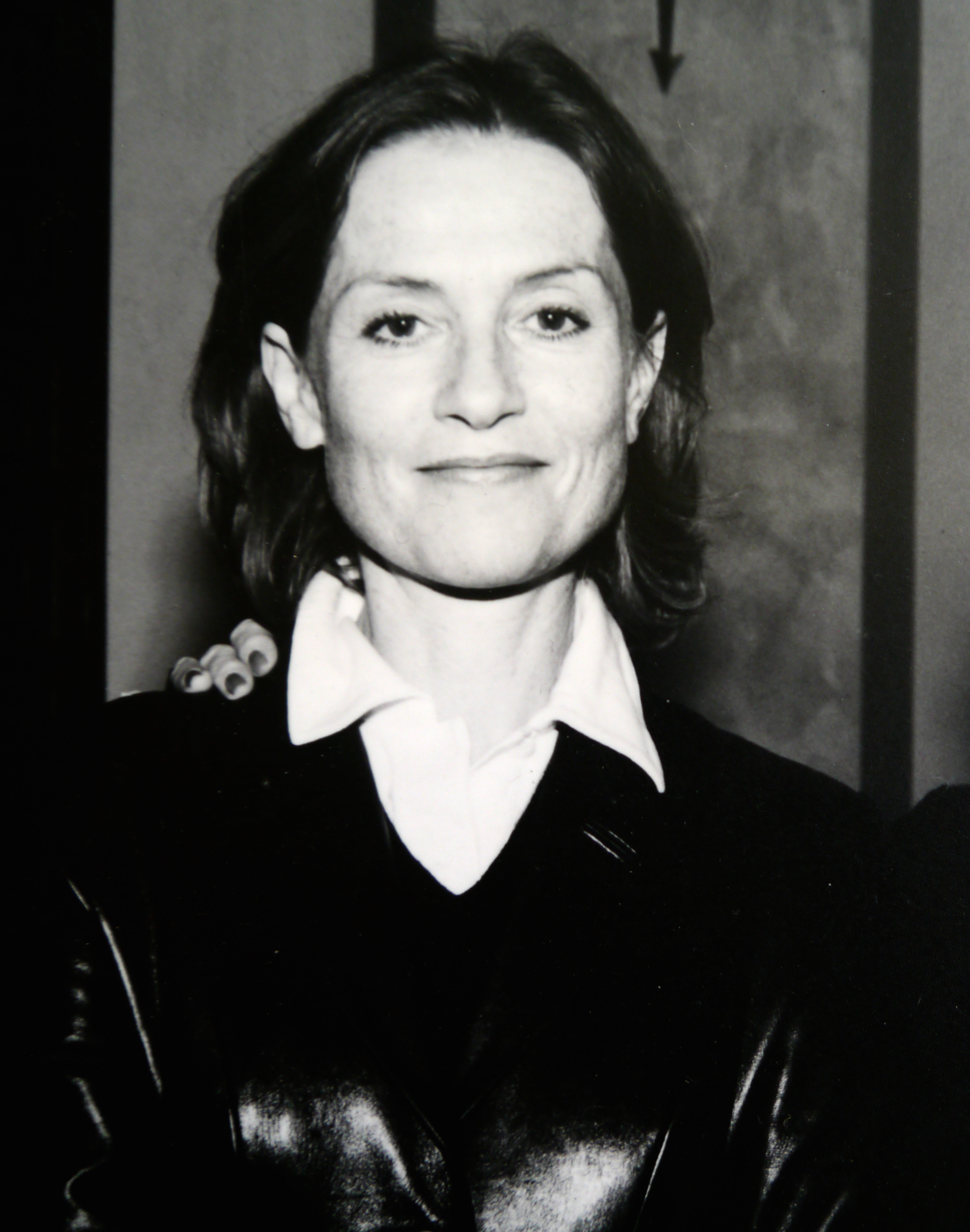
At the 1998 Cinemania Film Festival

In 1994, Huppert collaborated with American director Hal Hartley on Amateur, one of her few English-language performances since Heaven's Gate. She won acclaim for her role in La Séparation (1994) with David Parkinson of British Film Institute writing, "Her distinctive talent for suppressing suffering is readily evident in Christian Vincent’s excruciating study of her slowly disintegrating relationship with Daniel Auteuil, as Huppert imparts chilling intimacy to a withdrawn hand, an unanswering gaze, a treacherous silence and a careless word in conveying the pain of falling out of love." She portrayed a manic and homicidal post-office worker in Claude Chabrol's La Cérémonie (1995) for which she won the César Award for Best Actress and the Volpi Cup for Best Actress. Huppert continued her cinematic relationship with Chabrol in Rien ne va plus (1997) and Merci pour le Chocolat (2000).

=== 2000–2009: The Piano Teacher and acclaim ===
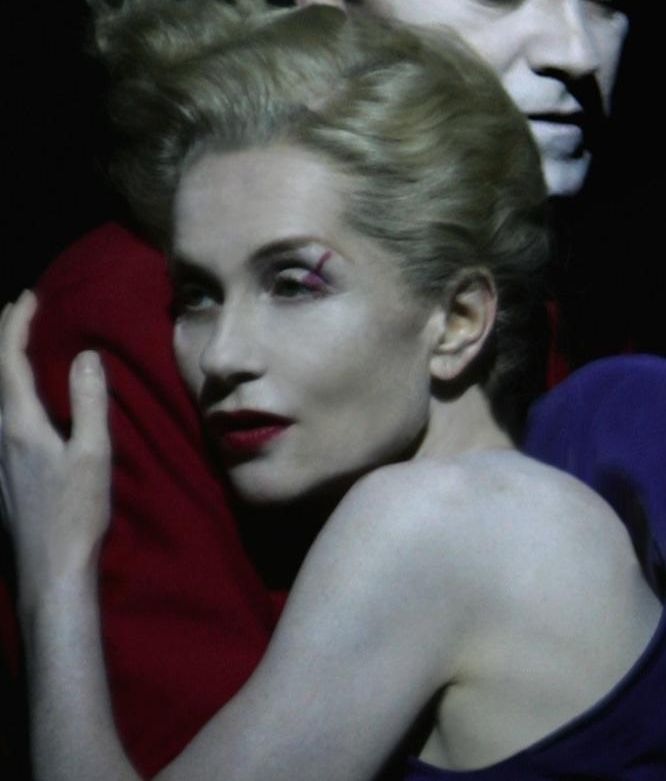
Huppert on stage in 2006

Huppert's first collaboration with Austrian director Michael Haneke was in The Piano Teacher (2001), based on the titular novel (Die Klavierspielerin) by Elfriede Jelinek, who was named a Nobel Laureate in Literature in 2004. In the film, she played a piano teacher who becomes involved with a young and charming pianist. Regarded as one of her most impressive turns, the performance won her the 2001 Best Actress Award at Cannes. David Denby of The New Yorker praised her work in the film, writing: "Much of her best acting is no more than a flicker of consciousness, barely visible around the edges of the mask. Yet she gives a classic account of repression and sexual hypocrisy, unleashing the kind of rage that the great Bette Davis might have expressed".

In 2002 she acted in the dark comedy musical film 8 Women, directed by François Ozon. Jonathan Cruiel of The San Francisco Chronicle wrote of her: "Huppert has a reputation for her intense portrayals, and in 8 Women, she steals every scene she's in as the uptight, melodramatic, bespectacled aunt." In 2004, she starred in Christophe Honoré's Ma Mère, based on a novel by Georges Bataille. She portrayed Hélène, a middle-aged mother in an incestuous relationship with her teenage son, played by Louis Garrel. She also starred opposite Dustin Hoffman and Jason Schwartzman in David O. Russell's 2004 film I Heart Huckabees.

Huppert also worked in Italy (with directors Paolo and Vittorio Taviani, Mauro Bolognini, Marco Ferreri and Marco Bellocchio), in Russia (with Igor Minaiev), in Central Europe (with Werner Schroeter, Andrzej Wajda, Ursula Meier, Michael Haneke, Márta Mészáros and Aleksandar Petrović) and in Asia (with Hong Sang-soo, Brillante Mendoza and Rithy Panh).

Huppert is also an acclaimed stage actress, receiving seven Molière Award nominations, including for the lead in a 2001 Paris production of Medea directed by Jacques Lassalle; and in 2005 in the title role of Ibsen's Hedda Gabler at the Odéon-Théâtre de l'Europe in Paris. Later that year, she toured the United States in a Royal Court Theatre production of Sarah Kane's theatrical piece 4.48 Psychosis. This production was directed by Claude Régy and performed in French. Huppert returned to the New York stage in 2009 to perform in Heiner Müller's Quartett. In 2009 she also starred in the film White Material; Sura Wood of The Associated Press declared that its director, Claire Denis, was "helped immeasurably by an astringent, fully committed performance from her leading lady, a gaunt, impossibly resolute Isabelle Huppert".

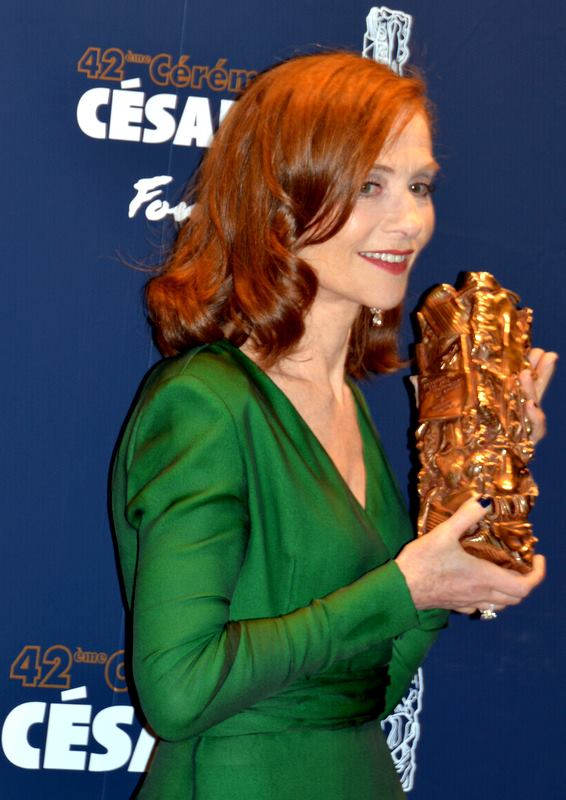
Huppert at the 42nd César Awards

Huppert served as president of the jury at the 2009 Cannes Film Festival. She had been a Member of the Jury and Master of Ceremony in previous years, as well as winning the Best Actress Award twice. As president in 2009, she and her jury awarded the Palme d'Or to The White Ribbon by Michael Haneke, her director on The Piano Teacher and Time of the Wolf.

=== 2010–2019: Theater roles and Elle ===
In 2010, Huppert starred in the 11th-season finale of Law & Order: Special Victims Unit and was cast in the film Captive by Filipino director Brillante Mendoza. Huppert played one of the hostages of the Dos Palmas kidnappings.

In 2012, she starred in two films that competed for the Palme d'Or at the 2012 Cannes Film Festival: Michael Haneke's Amour and Hong Sang-soo's In Another Country, with the former winning the top prize. In 2013, she co-starred in Sydney Theatre Company's The Maids by Jean Genet, with Cate Blanchett and Elizabeth Debicki and directed by Benedict Andrews in a new English translation by Andrews and Andrew Upton. In 2014, the production toured in New York as a part of the Lincoln Center Festival. Marilyn Stasio of Variety wrote of Blanchett and Huppert's performances, "Blanchett gives a dynamic performance as Claire, the melodramatic sister, who flies into a fit at the least provocation. Huppert plays Solange as the smarter, more subtle, more bitterly ironic observer." She continued acting in films such as The Disappearance of Eleanor Rigby (2013), Macadam Stories (2015), and Louder Than Bombs (2015).

In 2016, she starred in two films that received widespread critical acclaim: Mia Hansen-Løve's Things to Come, which premiered at the Berlinale, and Paul Verhoeven's Elle, which premiered at Cannes. In Elle she played a woman who was raped by an intruder. Nick James of The British Film Institute wrote, "Isabelle Huppert gives one of the most riveting performances of her career...refusing to play the victim in a challenging, twisty thriller that seeks to subvert the expectations of the traditional revenge drama". Among other awards and nominations, she won the National Society of Film Critics Award, New York Film Critics Circle Award and the Los Angeles Film Critics Association Award for Best Actress for both films. For her performance in Elle, Huppert won several awards, including the Golden Globe Award, César Award for Best Actress, Gotham Independent Film Award, and the Independent Spirit Award for Best Actress. In addition, she was nominated for the Academy Award for Best Actress and the Critics' Choice Movie Award for Best Actress.

In 2016, Huppert starred in Krzysztof Warlikowski's stage production of Phèdre(s), which toured Europe as well as BAM in New York. Katie Baker of The Daily Beast wrote, "Huppert inhabits Phaedra—or Phèdre, for the play is in French with subtitles—for the full 3½ hours with such magnetic force that whatever faults the show has pale next to her raw vitality." In 2017, she was awarded the Europe Theatre Prize. On that occasion she performed with Jeremy Irons Correspondence 1944–1959 Readings from the epistles between Albert Camus and Maria Casares, and a special creation of Harold Pinter's Ashes to Ashes, at the Teatro Argentina in Rome. In 2019 she played the title role in Florian Zeller's play The Mother acting opposite Chris Noth at the Atlantic Theatre Company in New York. The Guardian praised Huppert's performance but criticised the production. Marilyn Stasio of Variety, "In the end, this turns out to be an upsetting play rather than an engaging one, and if it weren’t for Huppert’s mesmerizing performance, it might send you out of the theater and screaming into the night." In 2018 she acted as herself in the French comedy series Call My Agent! and as Jacqueline in Matthew Weiner's Amazon Prime series The Romanoffs. During this time she acted in Michael Haneke's Happy End (2017), Neil Jordan's Greta (2018) and Ira Sachs' Frankie (2019).

=== 2020–present ===
Huppert's recent credits include Jerzy Skolimowski's EO and Anthony Fabian's Mrs. Harris Goes to Paris (both released in 2022), as well as The Sitting Duck which was theatrically released in 2023 after having premiered at the Venice International Film Festival in 2022. In 2024, she starred in her third collaboration with Hong Sang-soo in A Traveler's Needs that competed at the 2024 Berlin Film Festival, where it won the Grand Jury Prize.

On stage, Huppert has starred in the following plays The Glass Menagerie as Amanda Wingfield, directed by Ivo van Hove (2022), The Cherry Orchard as Lyubov, directed by Tiago Rodrigues (2023). Both productions have garnered Huppert nominations for Best Actress in a Play at the Molière Awards. Her other stage credits include a reinterpretation of Jean Racine's Bérénice (2024), directed by Romeo Castelluci at the Théâtre de la Ville in Paris; and as Mary, Queen of Scots in the experimental play Mary Said What She Said (2019-) directed by Robert Wilson which have toured in many select European cities.

Huppert is also a global ambassador of luxury fashion line Balenciaga. In 2024, Huppert presided as the Jury President for the main competition of the 81st edition of Venice Film Festival.

In 2025, Huppert has starred in LUZ as Sabine, directed by Flora Lau. The film debuted at the Sundance Film Festival on the festival's opening day of 23 January 2025 in the World Cinema Dramatic Competition category.

In July 2026 she was elected as president of the Cinémathèque française.

== Personal life ==
Huppert had been in a relationship with French writer, producer and director Ronald Chammah since about 1982. Before that, she lived with producer Daniel Toscan du Plantier for several years.

She has three children with Chammah, including the actress Lolita Chammah, with whom she acted in five films, including Copacabana (2010) and Barrage (2017).

Huppert is the owner of the repertory cinemas Christine Cinéma Club and Ecoles Cinéma Club in Paris, which her son Lorenzo curates.

== Acting credits and accolades ==
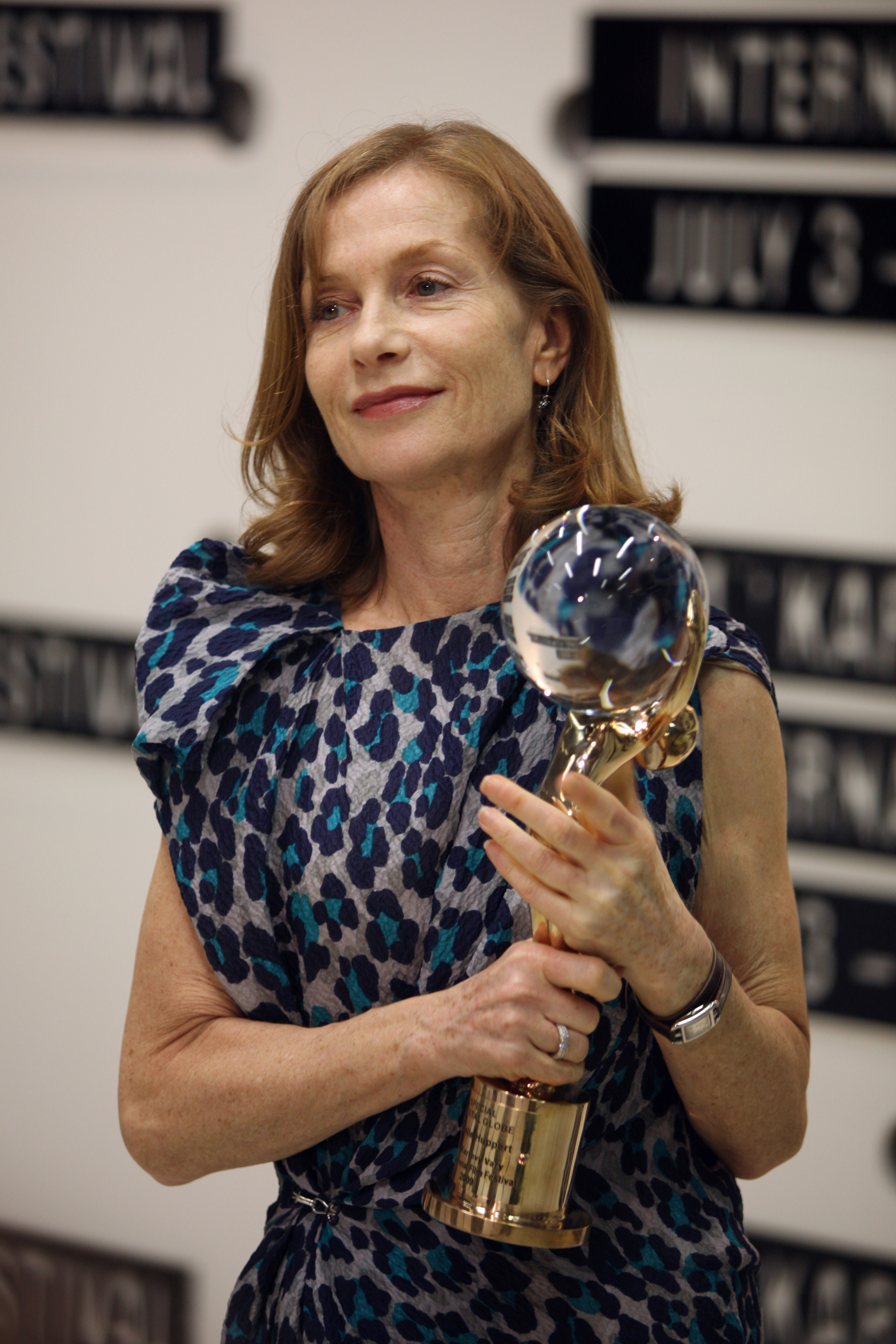
Huppert poses with Special Crystal Globe for outstanding artistic contribution to the world cinema at 44th Karlovy Vary International Film Festival

Huppert has been nominated 17 times, becoming the most nominated actress in the history of César Awards, winning Best Actress twice: in 1996 for her work in La Cérémonie (1995), and in 2017 for her role in Elle (2016). She is one of only four women who have twice won Best Actress at the Cannes Film Festival: in 1978 for her role in Violette Nozière by Claude Chabrol (tied with Jill Clayburgh) and in 2001 for The Piano Teacher by Michael Haneke.

She is also one of only four women who have twice received the Volpi Cup for Best Actress at the Venice Film Festival: in 1988 for her part in Une affaire de femmes (tied with Shirley MacLaine), and in 1995 for La Cérémonie (tied with her partner in the movie, Sandrine Bonnaire). Both films were directed by Claude Chabrol. Additionally, she received a Special Lion in 2005 for her role in Gabrielle. Huppert was twice voted Best Actress at the European Film Awards: in 2001 for playing Erika Kohut in The Piano Teacher, and in 2002 with the entire cast of 8 Women (directed by François Ozon). The latter cast also won a Silver Bear for Outstanding Artistic Contribution, at the 2002 Berlin International Film Festival. Huppert won the Golden Globe Award for Best Actress in a Motion Picture – Drama and received her first nomination for the Academy Award for Best Actress for her work in Elle.

In 2008, she received the Stanislavsky Award for outstanding achievement in acting, and devotion to the principles of the Stanislavski's system. She was made Chevalier (Knight) of the Ordre national du Mérite on 8 December 1994 and was promoted to Officier (Officer) in 2005. She was made Chevalier (Knight) of the Légion d'honneur on 29 September 1999 and was promoted to Officier (Officer) in 2009. In 2010, she won the Best Actress award from the 34th Cairo International Film Festival, for her role in Copacabana. She was selected for Honorary Golden Bear Lifetime Achievement Award at 72nd Berlin International Film Festival awarded on 15 February 2022 in festival award ceremony at Berlinale Palást.

Europe Theatre Prize

On 17 December 2017 she was awarded the XVI Europe Theatre Prize, in Rome. The Prize organisation stated:

From her beginnings as a stage actress, Isabelle Huppert has moved between cinema and theatre with an extraordinary productivity, and with results which have made her perhaps the most garlanded performer in the two spheres. Her name, directly linked with French and European auteur cinema, is a guarantee of quality for the productions in which she takes part: she is an artist who chooses her scripts, her roles and the directors with whom she works with the greatest care, always able to make her mark on the films in which she appears. Isabelle Huppert, a world icon in contemporary cinema, has never abandoned the theatre, an art which she continues to practise with passion, deep interest and admirable playing skills. The reasons for her passionate love of theatre, which she herself gave in her message for this year's World Theatre Day, are completely in accord with the motivation for the 16th Europe Theatre Prize, which we award to her this year with real pleasure: «Theatre for me represents the other; it is dialogue, and it is the absence of hatred. "Friendship between peoples" – now, I do not know too much about what this means, but I believe in community, in friendship between spectators and actors, in the lasting union between all the people theatre brings together – translators, educators, costume designers, stage artists, academics, practitioners and audiences. Theatre protects us; it shelters us…I believe that theatre loves us…as much as we love it… I remember an old-fashioned stage director I worked for, who, before the nightly raising of the curtain would yell, with full-throated firmness "Make way for theatre!"»

== Legacy and reception ==
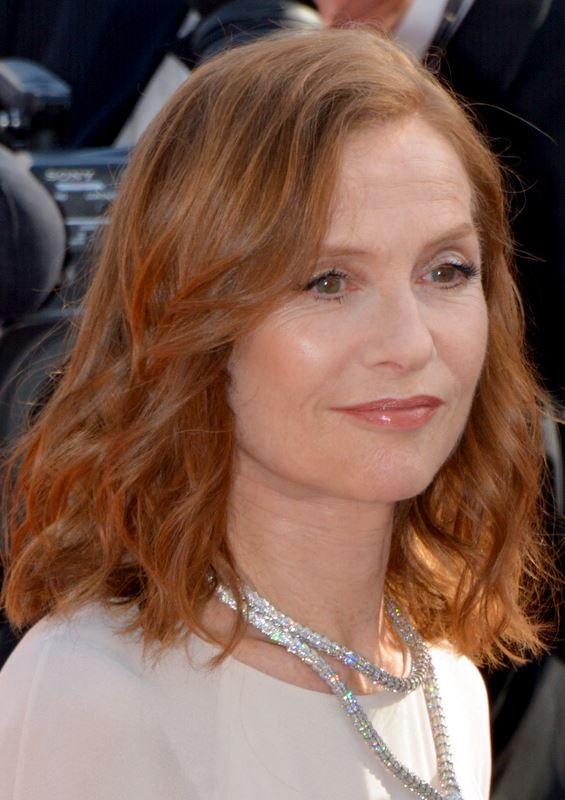
Huppert photo by Georges Biard at the 2017 Cannes Film Festival

Huppert holds the record for being the actress with the most films entered in the official competition of the Cannes Film Festival. As of 2026, she has had 23 films in the main competition and a total of 31 films screened at the festival. Huppert's frequent Cannes' appearances have led her to be dubbed "the queen of Cannes" by journalists.

David Thomson on Claude Chabrol's Madame Bovary: "[Huppert] has to rate as one of the most accomplished actresses in the world today, even if she seems short of the passion or agony of her contemporary, Isabelle Adjani." Stuart Jeffries of The Observer on The Piano Teacher: "This is surely one of the greatest performances of Huppert's already illustrious acting career, though it is one that is very hard to watch." Director, Michael Haneke: "[Huppert] has such professionalism, the way she is able to represent suffering. At one end you have the extreme of her suffering and then you have her icy intellectualism. No other actor can combine the two." Of her performance in 2007's Hidden Love, Roger Ebert said "Isabelle Huppert makes one good film after another.... she is fearless. Directors often depend on her gift for conveying depression, compulsion, egotism and despair. She can be funny and charming, but then so can a lot of actors. She is in complete command of a face that regards the void with blankness." In 2010, S.T. VanAirsdale described her as "arguably the world's greatest screen actress."

Huppert's work in Elle and Things to Come topped The Playlist's ranking of "The 25 Best Performances Of 2016", stating: "She runs the emotional gamut from one film to the next, carnal, savage, shattered, listless, invulnerable but exposed, a woman on the verge of collapse who refuses to succumb to her instabilities. Huppert's career spans four decades and change, plus a heap of awards and accolades, but with Elle and Things To Come, she could well be having her best year yet."

== See also ==
- List of Academy Award winners and nominees from France
- List of actors nominated for Academy Awards for non-English performances
