= Molière Award for Best Supporting Actress =

French theatre award for actresses

- Awarded for: Best Performance by an Actress in a Supporting Role
- Country: France
- Presented by: Molière Award
- First award: Sabine Haudepin for Kean (1987)
- Website: https://www.lesmolieres.com/

Molière Award for Best Supporting Actress.

== Winners and nominees ==
=== 1980's ===
- 1987 : Sabine Haudepin in Kean
  - Anne Alvaro in Tonight We Improvise (Ce soir on improvise)
  - Catherine Arditi in Adriana Monti
  - Lucienne Hamon in Conversations After a Burial (Conversations après un enterrement)
  - Magali Noël in Cabaret
- 1988 : Catherine Salviat in Dialogues of the Carmelites (Dialogues des carmélites)
  - Pascale de Boysson in Fall (Ce que voit Fox)
  - Denise Chalem in Double Inconstancy (La Double Inconstance)
  - Nicole Jamet in The Secret (Le Secret)
  - Nada Strancar in The Winter's Tale (Le Conte d'hiver)
- 1989 : Christine Murillo in The Seagull (La Mouette)
  - Béatrice Agenin in Une femme sans histoire
  - Catherine Rich in La Vraie Vie
  - Martine Sarcey in Une absence
  - Michèle Simonnet in Just Between Ourselves (Entre nous soit dit)

=== 1990's ===
- 1990 : Judith Magre in Greek
  - Catherine Frot in Faut pas tuer Maman
  - Lucienne Hamon in The Passage of Winter (La Traversée de l'hiver)
  - Christiane Muller in Les Palmes de Monsieur Schutz
  - Martine Sarcey in The Passage of Winter (La Traversée de l'hiver)
- 1991 : Catherine Arditi in A croquer... ou l'Ivre de cuisine
  - Annie Grégorio in Coiffure pour dames
  - Catherine Rich in The Girl from Maxim's (La Dame de chez Maxim)
  - Catherine Rouvel in Eurydice
  - Maïa Simon in Heldenplatz
- 1992 : Danièle Lebrun in Le Misanthrope
  - Myriam Boyer in Roberto Zucco
  - Michèle Laroque in Ornifle or It's Later than you Think (Ornifle)
  - Catherine Rich in The Girl from Maxim's (La Dame de chez Maxim)
  - Marie-France Santon in The Waltz of the Toreadors (La Valse des toréadors)
- 1993 : Françoise Bertin in Temps contre temps
  - Annick Alane in Enter a Free Man (Les dimanches de Monsieur Riley)
  - Nadia Barentin in Monsieur Klebs et Rosalie
  - Gisèle Casadesus in Le Jugement dernier
  - Annie Grégorio in Une folie
- 1994 : Annick Alane in Fashions for Ladies (Tailleur pour dames)
  - Gisèle Casadesus in Le Retour en Touraine
  - Catherine Rich in Quand elle dansait...
  - Josiane Stoléru in The Visitor (Le Visiteur)
  - Marie Trintignant in The Homecoming (Le Retour)
- 1995 : Catherine Frot in Un air de famille
  - Sabine Haudepin in Quadrille
  - Claire Maurier in Un air de famille
  - Marie-France Santon in Business is business (Les Affaires sont les affaires)
  - Michèle Simonnet in La Chambre d'amis
- 1996 : Sonia Vollereaux in Lapin lapin
  - Catherine Arditi in The Diary of a Young Girl (Le journal d'Anne Frank)
  - Florence Darel in An Ideal Husband (Un mari idéal)
  - Claire Nadeau in Benefactors (Le bonheur des autres)
  - Edith Perret in An Ideal Husband (Un mari idéal)
- 1997 : Dominique Blanchar in As Better, Better than Before (Tout comme il faut)
  - Elisabeth Commelin in The Libertine (Le Libertin)
  - Ginette Garcin in The Man Who Walked Through Walls (Le Passe-muraille)
  - Chantal Lauby in La Terrasse
  - Maïa Simon in Un cœur français
- 1998 : Geneviève Casile in Bel-Ami
  - Isabelle Candelier in André le magnifique
  - Nathalie Cerda in The Hygiene of the Assassin (Hygiène de l'assassin)
  - Michèle Garcia in Funny Money (Espèces menacées)
  - Valérie Mairesse in The Surprise of Love (La Surprise de l'amour)
- 1999 : Geneviève Fontanel in A Delicate Balance (Délicate balance)
  - Micheline Dax in Frederick or the Crime Boulevard (Frédérick ou le boulevard du crime)
  - Chantal Neuwirth in Rêver peut-être
  - Florence Pernel in A Streetcar Named Desire (Un Tramway nommé désir)
  - Frédérique Tirmont in London Assurance (Le Bel Air de Londres)

=== 2000's ===
- 2000 : Dominique Blanchar in The Learned Ladies (Les Femmes savantes)
  - Catherine Arditi in Between Worlds (Hôtel des deux mondes)
  - Geneviève Fontanel in Raisons de famille
  - Claire Nadeau in Mariages et conséquences
  - Chantal Neuwirth in Les Nouvelles brèves de comptoir
  - Beata Nilska in A torts et à raisons
- 2001 : Annick Alane in Cat on a Hot Tin Roof (Une chatte sur un toit brûlant)
  - Aurore Clément in The Lady of the Camellias (La Dame aux camélias)
  - Eliza Maillot in Un homme à la mer
  - Yasmina Reza in Life X 3 (Trois versions de la vie)
  - Barbara Schulz in Joyeuses Pâques
- 2002 : Annie Grégorio in Théâtre sans animaux
  - Nadia Barentin in La Griffe (A71)
  - Denise Chalem in Conversations with my Father (Conversations avec mon père)
  - Anne Consigny in Elvire
  - Claire Nadeau in Le Jardin des apparences
  - Josiane Stoléru in The Glass Menagerie (La Ménagerie de verre)
- 2003 : Annie Sinigalia in A Song at Twilight (Poste restante)
  - Annick Alane in État critique
  - Anne Consigny in La Preuve
  - Marina Hands in Phèdre
  - Eliza Maillot in Un petit jeu sans conséquence
- 2004 : Martine Sarcey in L'Inscription
  - Evelyne Buyle in L'Invité
  - Guilaine Londez in L'Hiver sous la table
  - Lysiane Meis in Things We Do for Love (L'Amour est enfant de salaud)
  - Dominique Reymond in A Spanish Play (Une pièce espagnole)
- 2005 : Norah Krief in Hedda Gabler
  - Monique Chaumette in Vigil (Tantine et moi)
  - Annie Grégorio in Musée haut, musée bas
  - Anne Loiret in Jacques a dit
  - Elisabeth Margoni in Sortie de scène
  - Lysiane Meis in Jacques a dit
- 2006 : Danièle Lebrun in Pygmalion
  - Béatrice Agenin in Barefoot in the Park (Pieds nus dans le parc)
  - Marina Foïs in Viol
  - Anne Loiret in Broken Glass (Le Miroir)
  - Josiane Stoléru in Conversations After a Burial (Conversations après un enterrement)
  - Marie Vincent in The Imaginary Invalid (Le Malade imaginaire)
- 2007 : Catherine Hiegel in Return to the Desert (Le Retour au désert)
  - Catherine Arditi in Cabaret
  - Brigitte Catillon in Eva
  - Marie-France Santon in Lady Windermere's Fan (L'Éventail de Lady Windermere)
  - Frédérique Tirmont in Dolores Claiborne
- 2008 : Valérie Bonneton in God of Carnage (Le Dieu du carnage)
  - Sabine Haudepin in Les Belles-sœurs
  - Norah Krief in King Lear (Le Roi Lear)
  - Bulle Ogier in L'Homme sans but
- 2009 : Monique Chaumette in Baby Doll
  - Hélène Alexandridis in Madame de Sade
  - Christiane Cohendy in Equus
  - Annie Mercier in Tartuffe
  - Martine Schambacher in La Charrue et les étoiles
  - Josiane Stoléru in Cochons d'Inde

=== 2010's ===
- 2010 : Claire Nadeau in The Loving Maid (La Serva amorosa)
  - Fabienne Chaudat in Colombe
  - Julie Pilod in The Cherry Orchard (La Cerisaie)
  - Isabelle Sadoyan in Les Fausses Confidences
  - Josiane Stoléru in Le Démon de Hannah
  - Dominique Valadié in Twelfth Night (La Nuit des rois)
- 2011 : Bulle Ogier in Autumn Dream (Rêve d’Automne)
  - Valérie Benguigui in Le Prénom
  - Brigitte Catillon in Nono
  - Dominique Constanza in A Fly in the Ointment (Un fil à la patte)
  - Nanou Garcia in Aller chercher demain
  - Christiane Millet in Winter Funeral (Funérailles d’hiver)
- 2014 : Isabelle Sadoyan in L'Origine du monde
  - Marie-Julie Baup in Divina
  - Christine Bonnard in La chanson de l'éléphant
  - Françoise Fabian in Tartuffe
  - Valérie Mairesse in Romeo and Juliet (Roméo et Juliette)
  - Bulle Ogier in Les Fausses Confidences
- 2015 : Dominique Reymond in Comment vous racontez la partie
  - Anne Azoulay in King Kong Théorie
  - Léna Bréban in The Other Place (La Maison d'à côté)
  - Marie‐Christine Danède in La Colère du Tigre
  - Noémie Gantier in Atomised (Les Particules élémentaires)
  - Agnès Sourdillon in The Imaginary Invalid (Le malade imaginaire)
- 2016 : Anne Bouvier in King Lear (Le Roi Lear)
  - Béatrice Agenin in Un certain Charles Spencer Chaplin
  - Michèle Garcia in La Dame blanche
  - Raphaëline Goupilleau in La Médiation
- 2017 : Évelyne Buyle in Les Femmes Savantes
  - Ludivine de Chastenet in Politiquement correct
  - Anne Loiret in Avant de s'envoler
  - Josiane Stoléru in Bella Figura
  - Dominique Valadié in Time and the Room (Le Temps et la chambre)
  - Florence Viala in Le Petit-Maître corrigé
- 2018 : Christine Murillo in Tartuffe
  - Audrey Bonnet in Actrice
  - Isabelle de Botton in Clérambard
  - Françoise Lépine in The Graduate (Le Lauréat)
  - Élodie Navarre in Le Fils
  - Paméla Ravassard in La Dame de chez Maxim
- 2019 : Ophélia Kolb in The Glass Menagerie
  - Sophie Artur in The Secretary Bird
  - Sophie Bouilloux in Kean
  - Brigitte Catillon in The Misanthrope
  - Annie Mercier in Thyestes
  - Sol Espeche in La Dama Boba ou celle qu’on trouvait idiote

=== 2020's ===
- 2020 : Dominique Blanc in Angels in America
  - Emmanuelle Bougerol in Suite française
  - Céline Esperin in Est-ce que j’ai une gueule d’Arletty ?
  - Valérie Lesort in The Fly
  - Ophélia Kolb in Details
  - Héloïse Wagner in Plus haut que le ciel
- 2022 : Ariane Mourier in As You Like It
  - Dominique Blanc in Tartuffe
  - Emmanuelle Bougerol in Gulliver's Travels
  - Ludivine de Chastenet in Force Majeure
  - Marie Lanchas in Berlin Berlin
  - Noémie Lvovsky in Avant la retraite
- 2023 : Agnès Boury in Une idée géniale
  - Manon Clavel in The Country
  - Marina Hands in King Lear
  - Karina Marimon in Big Mother
  - Élodie Menant in Je ne cours pas, je vole !
  - Josiane Stoléru in Glenn, naissance d'un prodige

== Multiple wins and nominations ==
Wins	Actress	Nominations
2	Annick Alane	4
2	Dominique Blanchar; Danièle Lebrun; Christine Murillo	2

Nominations	Actress
7	Josiane Stoléru
5	Catherine Arditi
4	Annick Alane; Annie Grégorio; Claire Nadeau; Catherine Rich
3	Béatrice Agenin; Brigitte Catillon; Sabine Haudepin; Anne Loiret; Bulle Ogier; Marie-France Santon; Martine Sarcey
