= Évelyne Buyle =

French actress

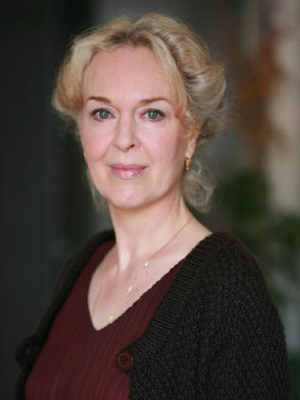
- Born: 3 June 1948 (age 77); Le Perreux-sur-Marne, France
- Occupation: Actress
- Years active: 1970–present

Évelyne Buyle (born 3 June 1948) is a French actress.

== Career ==
Passionate about theater from a very young age, she joined L’école de la rue Blanche to learn the basics of acting. She then took classes with Maurice Escande to learn the art of improvisation. Then, she followed a more classical training with Jean-Laurent Cochet. She started her career in theater, in 1970, with the play Un piano dans l'herbe directed by André Barsacq.

She is best known for playing Maryvonne Roman in the TV Series Louis la Brocante from 1998 to 2014.

In 2017, she won the Molière Award for Best Supporting Actress for her work in Les Femmes Savantes, directed by Catherine Hiegel. She was previously nominated in the same category, in 2004, for L'Invité directed by Jean-Luc Moreau.

== Personal life ==
From 1968 to 1972, she was married to Alain Jean Pierre Robichon.

== Theatre ==
Year	Title	Author	Director	Notes
1970	Un piano dans l'herbe	Françoise Sagan	André Barsacq	
1972	Boeing-Boeing	Marc Camoletti	Marc Camoletti	
1972	Dix perles de culture	Jacques Laurent & Claude Martine	René Dupuy	
1975	The Star-Spangled Girl	Neil Simon	Emilio Bruzzo	
1977	Pygmalion	George Bernard Shaw	Raymond Gérôme	
1981	Thérèse Raquin	Émile Zola	Raymond Rouleau	
1984	Romantic Comedy	Bernard Slade	Pierre Mondy	
1984	The Weaker Sex	Gustave Flaubert	Benno Besson	
1986	Violences	William Mastrosimone	Robert Allan Ackerman	
1986	Maman Sabouleux	Eugène Labiche	Isabelle Nanty	
1986	29 Degrés à l'Ombre	Eugène Labiche	Isabelle Nanty	
1987–88	George Dandin	Molière	Roger Planchon	
1989	Each In His Own Way	Luigi Pirandello	Claude Stratz	
1990	The Misanthrope	Molière	Jacques Weber	
1992	They're Playing Our Song	Neil Simon	Jean-Luc Moreau	
1994	Chantecler	Edmond Rostand	Jérôme Savary	
1995–96	Tartuffe	Molière	Benno Besson	
1996	Le Siècle	Michèle Laurence	François Bourcier	
1998	Ardèle ou la Marguerite	Jean Anouilh	Pierre Franck	
2002	Les Femmes d'Artistes	Alphonse Daudet	Philippe Rondest	
2003	Love	Murray Schisgal	Michel Fagadau	
2003–04	L'Invité	David Pharao	Jean-Luc Moreau	Nominated - Molière Award for Best Supporting Actress
2005–06	Une heure et demie de retard	Gérald Sibleyras & Jean Dell	Bernard Murat	
2009–10	Les Autres	Jean-Claude Grumberg	Daniel Colas	
2012–14	Comme s'il en pleuvait	Sébastien Thiéry	Bernard Murat	
2015	The Misanthrope	Molière	Michel Fau	
2016	Une famille modèle	Ivan Calbérac	Anne Bourgeois	
2016	L'Invité	David Pharao	Jean-Luc Moreau	
2016–17	Les Femmes savantes	Molière	Catherine Hiegel	Molière Award for Best Supporting Actress
2017–18	Ramses II	Sébastien Thiéry	Stéphane Hillel	
2020–23	The Importance of Being Earnest	Oscar Wilde	Arnaud Denis	

== Filmography ==
Year	Title	Role	Director	Notes
1971	Au théâtre ce soir	Thérésane	Pierre Sabbagh	TV series (1 episode)
1972	Les malheurs d'Alfred	Lucrèce	Pierre Richard	
1972	Les enquêtes du commissaire Maigret	Mademoiselle Blanche	Claude Boissol	TV series (1 episode)
1973	Hail the Artist	Bérénice	Yves Robert	
1973	The Edifying and Joyous Story of Colinot	The paid companion	Nina Companeez	
1973	Molière pour rire et pour pleurer	The valuable	Marcel Camus	TV mini-series
1974	La gueule de l'emploi	Anne	Jacques Rouland	
1974	Bons baisers... à lundi	Zaza Colibri	Michel Audiard	
1974	Comment réussir quand on est con et pleurnichard	Marie-Josée Mulot	Michel Audiard	
1974	À dossiers ouverts	Josiane	Claude Boissol	TV series (1 episode)
1975	L'Ibis rouge	Evelyne Viliers	Jean-Pierre Mocky	
1977	Parisian Life	Gabrielle	Christian-Jaque	
1977	Servant and Mistress	Christine	Bruno Gantillon	
1977	Comme sur des roulettes	Louise-Jacynthe Leblanc	Nina Companeez	
1977	Tom et Julie	Julie	Nina Companeez	TV movie
1977	Les folies Offenbach	Céline Montaland	Michel Boisrond	TV mini-series
1978	L'horoscope	Josy	Jean Girault	
1978	Les réformés se portent bien	Christine	Philippe Clair	
1978	Messieurs les ronds de cuir	Gabrielle	Daniel Ceccaldi	TV movie
1978	Un ours pas comme les autres	Lola	Nina Companeez	TV mini-series
1979	La ville des silences	Rich Woman	Jean Marboeuf	
1979	La muse et la Madone	Mathias's mother	Nina Companeez	TV movie
1979	Les dames de la côte	Georgette-Dora	Nina Companeez	TV mini-series
1980	Le vol d'Icare	L.N.	Daniel Ceccaldi	TV movie
1980	C'est pas Dieu possible	Noëmie Plancherine	Edmond Tiborovsky	TV movie
1981	Le roi des cons	Daisy	Claude Confortès	
1982	Qu'est-ce qu'on attend pour être heureux!	Jean Harlow	Coline Serreau	
1984	Série noire	Félicia	Jean-Pierre Decourt	TV series (1 episode)
1986	Rosa la rose, fille publique	Thirty-Five	Paul Vecchiali	
1986	Comme un poisson sans bicyclette	Anne-Marie	Jean-Claude Charnay	TV movie
1986	Grand hôtel	Émilie de Bourry	Jean Kerchbron	TV series (1 episode)
1988	Dandin	Claudine	Roger Planchon	
1988	Bonjour l'angoisse	Lily	Pierre Tchernia	
1989–90	Si Guitry m'était conté	Various	Alain Dhénaut & Yves-André Hubert	TV series (3 episodes)
1992	L'affût	Samantha	Yannick Bellon	
1992	List of Merite	Geneviève Fournet	Charles Nemes	
1992	Une maman dans la ville	Solange	Miguel Courtois	TV movie
1995	Les maîtresses de mon mari	Andrée Maréchal	Christiane Lehérissey	TV movie
1997	La bastide blanche	Victorine	Miguel Courtois	TV mini-series
1998	Bimboland	Gaëlle Bussy	Ariel Zeitoun	
1998–2000	Dossier: disparus	Catherine Savarin	Antoine Lorenzi & Paolo Barzman	TV series (4 episodes)
1998–2014	Louis la brocante	Maryvonne Roman	Michel Favart, Pierre Sisser, ...	TV series (44 episodes)
2001	A Hell of a Day	Evelyne	Marion Vernoux	
2001	Le coeur sur la main	The Posh	Marie-Anne Chazel	Short
2002	Irene	Jacqueline	Ivan Calbérac	
2002	Hypnotized and Hysterical (Hairstylist Wanted)	Madame Pélissier	Claude Duty	
2003	18 ans après	Natacha	Coline Serreau	
2004	Les parisiens	The Woman of the train	Claude Lelouch	
2004	Une vie à t'attendre	Candice	Thierry Klifa	
2004	Nicolas au pays des âmes	Babette	Patrice Martineau	TV movie
2005	Quand les anges s'en mêlent...	The Aunt	Crystel Amsalem	
2006	Le héros de la famille	Madame Robineau	Thierry Klifa	
2011	Mort d'un président	Claude Pompidou	Pierre Aknine	TV movie
2012	Max	The bourgeois	Stéphanie Murat	
2012	Nuts	François's mother	Yann Coridian	
2012	Profilage	Madame Rivette	Julien Despaux	TV series (1 episode)
2013	La rupture	Claude Pompidou	Laurent Heynemann	TV movie
2013	Crime d'État	Danielle Breem	Pierre Aknine	TV movie
2014	Benoît Brisefer: Les taxis rouges	Madame Adolphine	Manuel Pradal	
2014	Famille et turbulences	Jeanne	Eric Duret	TV movie
2015	Mes grand-mères et moi	Chantal	Thierry Binisti	TV movie
2016	Qui sème l'amour...	Huguette	Lorenzo Gabriele	TV movie
2016	Le mari de mon mari	Juliette's mother	Charles Nemes	TV movie
2016	Cherif	Céline's mother	Julien Zidi	TV series (1 episode)
2018	Place publique	Madame Chaulieu	Agnès Jaoui	
2018	Return of the Hero	Madame Beaugrand	Laurent Tirard	
2019	Madame	Madame	Garth Jennings	Short
2020	De Gaulle	The aunt	Gabriel Le Bomin	
2020	Les apparences	Madame Belin	Marc Fitoussi	
2023	Sur la branche	Marguerite Dupré	Marie Garel-Weiss	
2023	The Crime Is Mine	Simone Bernard	François Ozon	
