= Alane =

Alane may refer to:

- Aluminium hydride, a chemical reagent used as a reducing agent
- "Alane" (song), a 1997 song recorded by Wes Madiko

== People with the surname ==
- Annick Alane (born 1925), French actress
- Bernard Alane (born 1948), French actor
