= Annie Mercier =

French actress

- Occupation: Actress
- Years active: 1973 – present

Annie Mercier is a French film and theatrical actress who received two nominations at the Molière Award for Best Supporting Actress in 2009 for her role in Tartuffe and in 2019, for her role in Thyestes.

== Theatre ==
Annie Mercier theatre credits
Year	Title	Author	Director
1973	Histoire aux cheveux rouges	Maurice Yendt	Michel Dieuaide & Maurice Yendt
1982	Erzebeth Bathory	Jean-Luc Jeener	Jean-Luc Jeener
1983	Belle famille	Victor Haïm	Daniel Romand
1983	Kléber et Marie-Louise	Jean-Marie Lhôte	Patrick Collet
1984–85	Der Rosenkavalier	Hugo von Hofmannsthal	Jean-Louis Thamin
1986	Des aveugles	Hervé Guibert	Philippe Adrien
1988–90	Cami, drames de la vie courante	Cami	Philippe Adrien
1990–91	L’Annonce faite à Marie	Paul Claudel	Philippe Adrien
1991	Les Vieux Os	Olivier Charneux	Samuel Bonnafil
1991	The Hunting Party	Thomas Bernhard	Jean-Louis Thamin
1992	Personnages avec passé	Claude Bourgeyx	Jean-Louis Thamin
1992	Blanche Aurore Céleste	Noëlle Renaude	Philippe Adrien
1993	La Tranche	Jean-Daniel Magnin	Philippe Adrien
1993	L’Annonce faite à Marie	Paul Claudel	Philippe Adrien
1994	Les Libertins	Roger Planchon	Roger Planchon
1995–96	The Visit	Friedrich Dürrenmatt	Régis Santon
1996–97	Phaedra	Seneca	Jean Lacornerie
1997	14 février Saint Valentin	Sandra J. Albert	Régis Santon
1998–99	Vie de Myriam C.	François Bon	Charles Tordjman
1999	Volpone	Ben Jonson	Stéphane Fiévet
1999	Excédent de poids, insignifiant : amorphe	Werner Schwab	Philippe Adrien
2000	Abîme aujourd’hui la ville	François Bon	Claude Baqué
2001	Tales from the Vienna Woods	Ödön von Horváth	Laurent Gutmann
2002	Abîme aujourd’hui la ville	François Bon	Stéphane Fiévet
2003–04	From S Plateau	Oriza Hirata	Laurent Gutmann
2004	Titanica	Sébastien Harrisson	Claude Duparfait
2004	Stabat Mater	Antonio Tarantino	Marc-Ange Sanz
2005	Laisse-moi te dire une chose	Rémi de Vos	Stéphane Fiévet
2006	Nous, les héros	Jean-Luc Lagarce	Guillaume Vincent
2006	Getting Attention	Martin Crimp	Christophe Rauck
2007	The Suicide	Nikolai Erdman	Anouch Paré
2007	Songs of Farewell	Oriza Hirata	Laurent Gutmann
2008	Tartuffe	Molière	Stéphane Braunschweig
2009	Songs of Farewell	Oriza Hirata	Laurent Gutmann
2009–10	Stabat Mater	Antonio Tarantino	Éric-Gaston Lorvoire
2009–10	Rosmersholm	Henrik Ibsen	Stéphane Braunschweig
2009–10	A Doll's House	Henrik Ibsen	Stéphane Braunschweig
2010	Getting Attention	Martin Crimp	Christophe Rauck
2010–11	Les Acteurs de bonne foi	Pierre de Marivaux	Jean-Pierre Vincent
2011–12	Je disparais	Arne Lygre	Stéphane Braunschweig
2012–13	Woodcutters	Thomas Bernhard	Claude Duparfait & Célie Pauthe
2012–13	Nouveau roman	Christophe Honoré	Christophe Honoré
2013–14	Slow Homecoming	Peter Handke	Stanislas Nordey
2014–15	August: Osage County	Tracy Letts	Dominique Pitoiset
2015–16	Fin de l’Histoire	Christophe Honoré	Christophe Honoré
2016	Lullaby, tragédie aérobique	Erika Z. Galli & Martina Ruggeri	Benoît Bradel
2017	Embrasse-moi sur ta tombe	Jean-Daniel Magnin	Jean-Daniel Magnin & Maryam Khakipour
2017	Le froid augmente avec la clarté	Thomas Bernhard	Claude Duparfait
2018	Je viens de la nuit où l’on souffre	Olivier Augrond	Olivier Augrond
2018–19	Thyestes	Seneca	Thomas Jolly
2019	Départ volontaire	Rémi de Vos	Christophe Rauck
2020	L’Éden Cinéma	Marguerite Duras	Christine Letailleur
2021–22	Berlin mon garçon	Marie NDiaye	Stanislas Nordey
2021–22	La Compagnie des spectres	Lydie Salvayre	Anne-Laure Liégeois
2021–23	Come Tu Mi Vuoi	Luigi Pirandello	Stéphane Braunschweig
2022	L’Éden Cinéma	Marguerite Duras	Christine Letailleur
2022–23	A Death in the Family	Alexander Zeldin	Alexander Zeldin
2024	Absalom, Absalom!	William Faulkner	Séverine Chavrier

== Filmography ==
=== Cinema ===
Annie Mercier film credits
Year	Title	Role	Director	Notes
1987	Les 2 crocodiles	The farmer's wife	Joël Séria	
1988	Frequent Death	Madame Fremont	Élisabeth Rappeneau	
1988	New York 1935	The mother	Michèle Ferrand-Lafaye	Short
1998	Cantique de la racaille	Judicial controller	Vincent Ravalec	
1999	Jacynthe, tu as un cul de feu	Jacynthe	Philippe Lubliner	Short
2000	Modern Life	Eliane	Laurence Ferreira Barbosa	
2000	Merci pour le geste	Geneviève	Claude Faraldo	
2001	Alias Betty	Jacqueline	Claude Miller	
2001	The Officers' Ward	Brothel madame	François Dupeyron	
2002	Le frère du guerrier	Castelet	Pierre Jolivet	
2003	Une affaire qui roule	Jean-Jacques's mother	Eric Veniard	
2004	The Role of Her Life	Nicole Becker	François Favrat	
2005	The Demon Stirs	Grandma	Marie Pascale Osterrieth	
2005	Bonbon au poivre	Mireille	Marc Fitoussi	Short
2010	The Women on the 6th Floor	Madame Triboulet	Philippe Le Guay	
2013	The Family	Madame Arnaud	Luc Besson	
2013	Bicycling with Molière	Tamara	Philippe Le Guay	
2014	SK1	Jeanne Morin	Frédéric Tellier	
2014	Almost Friends	Jackie	Anne Le Ny	
2016	Sophie's Misfortunes	Marianne	Christophe Honoré	
2017	Rock'n Roll	Casting director	Guillaume Canet	
2018	Vaurien	Josiane	Mehdi Senoussi	
2018	Through the Fire	Annie	Frédéric Tellier	
2018	Voyez comme on danse	Madame Andrée	Michel Blanc	
2019	Qu'un sang impur...	Madame Delignières	Abdel Raouf Dafri	
2019	The Girl with a Bracelet	Lise's lawyer	Stéphane Demoustier	
2019	The Mystery of Henri Pick	Bénédicte Le Floch	Rémi Bezançon	
2019	Les extraordinaires mésaventures de la jeune fille de pierre	La Victoire de Samothrace	Gabriel Abrantes	Short
2020	La pièce rapportée	The ice cream seller	Antonin Peretjatko	
2021	Anaïs in Love	Odile	Charline Bourgeois-Tacquet	
2021	Everything Went Fine	The clinic manager	François Ozon	
2022	Le pharaon, le sauvage et la princesse	Mother / Dame de compagnie	Michel Ocelot	
2023	Wahou!	Clotilde's mother	Bruno Podalydès	
2023	Consent	The doctor	Vanessa Filho	
2023	Magnificat	Agathe Marsac	Virginie Sauveur	

=== Television ===
Annie Mercier television credits
Year	Title	Role	Director	Notes
1992	Counterstrike	Sirma	Jean-Pierre Prévost	Episode: "Behind Bars"
1995	La vie de Marianne	The Innkeeper	Benoît Jacquot	TV movie
1995–97	Baldi	Yvanka	Michel Lang & Claude d'Anna	2 episodes
2001	La juge Beaulieu	The hotel manager	Joyce Buñuel	TV movie
2001	P.J.	Madame André	Benoît d'Aubert	1 episode
2002–03	Père et maire	Madame Cabri	Marion Sarraut, Marc Rivière, ...	3 episodes
2004	Maigret	The bougnat manager	Laurent Heynemann	1 episode
2007	Boulevard du Palais	Grandma Baudoin	Christian Bonnet	1 episode
2009	Les tricheurs	Auntie	Benoît d'Aubert	1 episode
2011	Goldman	Simone Signoret	Christophe Blanc	TV movie
2011	Braquo	Madame Arifa	Philippe Haïm & Eric Valette	6 episodes
2012	Chambre 327	Mathilde Keller	Benoît d'Aubert	TV movie
2012	Un village français	Edith	Philippe Triboit & Patrice Martineau	4 episodes
2015	Le passager	Francyszka Kubiela	Jérôme Cornuau	TV mini-series
2018	Les Disparus de Valenciennes	Jacqueline Devlaminck	Elsa Bennett & Hippolyte Dard	TV movie
2019	Meurtres dans le Jura	Marthe	Éric Duret	TV movie
2020	The Eddy	Bette	Laïla Marrakchi	TV mini-series
2020	Candice Renoir	Madame Barutel	Pascal Lahmani	1 episode
2022	Irma Vep	Philippe's Mother	Olivier Assayas	TV mini-series
2023	Caro Nostra	Rosa Vigan	Antoine Besse	TV mini-series

== Awards and nominations ==
Annie Mercier awards and nominations
Year	Award	Nominated work	Result
2009	Molière Award for Best Supporting Actress	Tartuffe	Nominated
2019	Molière Award for Best Supporting Actress	Thyestes	Nominated
