= Birgitt Haas Must Be Killed =

- Directed by: Laurent Heynemann
- Written by: Pierre Fabre; Laurent Heynemann; Caroline Huppert
- Based on: L'histoire de Birgitt Haas by Guy Teisseire
- Produced by: Jean-Serge Breton; Yves Gasser
- Starring: Philippe Noiret; Jean Rochefort; Lisa Kreuzer
- Cinematography: Jean-Francis Gondre
- Music by: Philippe Sarde
- Production companies: Films A2; Zénith Production
- Release date: 2 September 1981
- Running time: 105 minutes
- Countries: France; West Germany
- Language: French

Birgitt Haas Must Be Killed (French: Il faut tuer Birgitt Haas) is a 1981 French-West German political thriller film directed by Laurent Heynemann and starring Philippe Noiret, Jean Rochefort and Lisa Kreuzer. It is based on the novel L'histoire de Birgitt Haas by French film critic Guy Teisseir (1934-1993).

== Plot ==
Athanase, head of a top-secret counterintelligence group called "Hangar", is given the task of eliminating Birgitt Haas, a former German terrorist. A new ambitious member of the group, Colonna, suggests disguising the assassination as a crime of passion by connecting Birgitt with a random man who would later take the blame for the murder. For this role, Colonna suggests Bauman, an unemployed, weak-willed man whose wife left him. Bauman's ex-wife happens to be Colonna's mistress. Upon his arrival in Munich, Bauman meets Birgitt, falls in love with her and plans to go away with her. Athanase's group proceeds with their assassination plan, but Bauman intervenes. In the ensuing shootout, Colonna is mortally wounded by Birgitt who then surrenders to the police.

== Cast ==
- Philippe Noiret as Athanase
- Jean Rochefort as Charles-Philippe Bauman
- Lisa Kreuzer as Monica / Birgitt Haas
- Bernard Le Coq as Colonna
- Maurice Teynac as Chamrode
- Michel Beaune as Delaunay
- Victor Garrivier as Nader
- Monique Chaumette as Laura
- Christian Bouillette
- Stephan Meldegg as Steinhof
- Peter Chatel as Betz
- Roland Blanche as Othenin
- Dagmar Deisen as Gisella
- Lucienne Hamon as Claire, Athanase's wife
- Axel Ganz as Weidman
- André Wilms as Volker

== Reception ==
The film was only moderately successful in France and sold 949,556 tickets.

It received mixed reviews in the U.S. Vincent Canby in The New York Times called it "an espionage melodrama of startling ineptitude" and "a movie of wrong-headed solemnity." The Washington Post criticized Heynemann and his screenwriting collaborators for approaching "a shaky thriller premise in the guise of rank, soggy-sleeved sentimentalists", and added that the film "would be substantially improved if it took a cold-eyed view of its characters." The Christian Science Monitor said it was "resonant and involving much of the time, but slippery and superficial in its refusal to take a forthright stand on the issue of terrorism itself." Stanley Kauffmann in The New Republic said the film hit "the double bull's eye". In WOR-TV & The New York Journal, Judith Crist called it "an eerie, fantastic tale of undercover intrigue", and added that "three stunning performances--by Philippe Noiret, Jean Rochefort and Lisa Kreuzer--give credibility and power." Bay Area Reporter called it "a good thriller, and more compassionate than most", and concluded: "this is decidedly not one of those spy films in which people are no more than numbers; even minor characters are fleshed out into human form."
