= Bernard Alane =

French actor (born 1948)

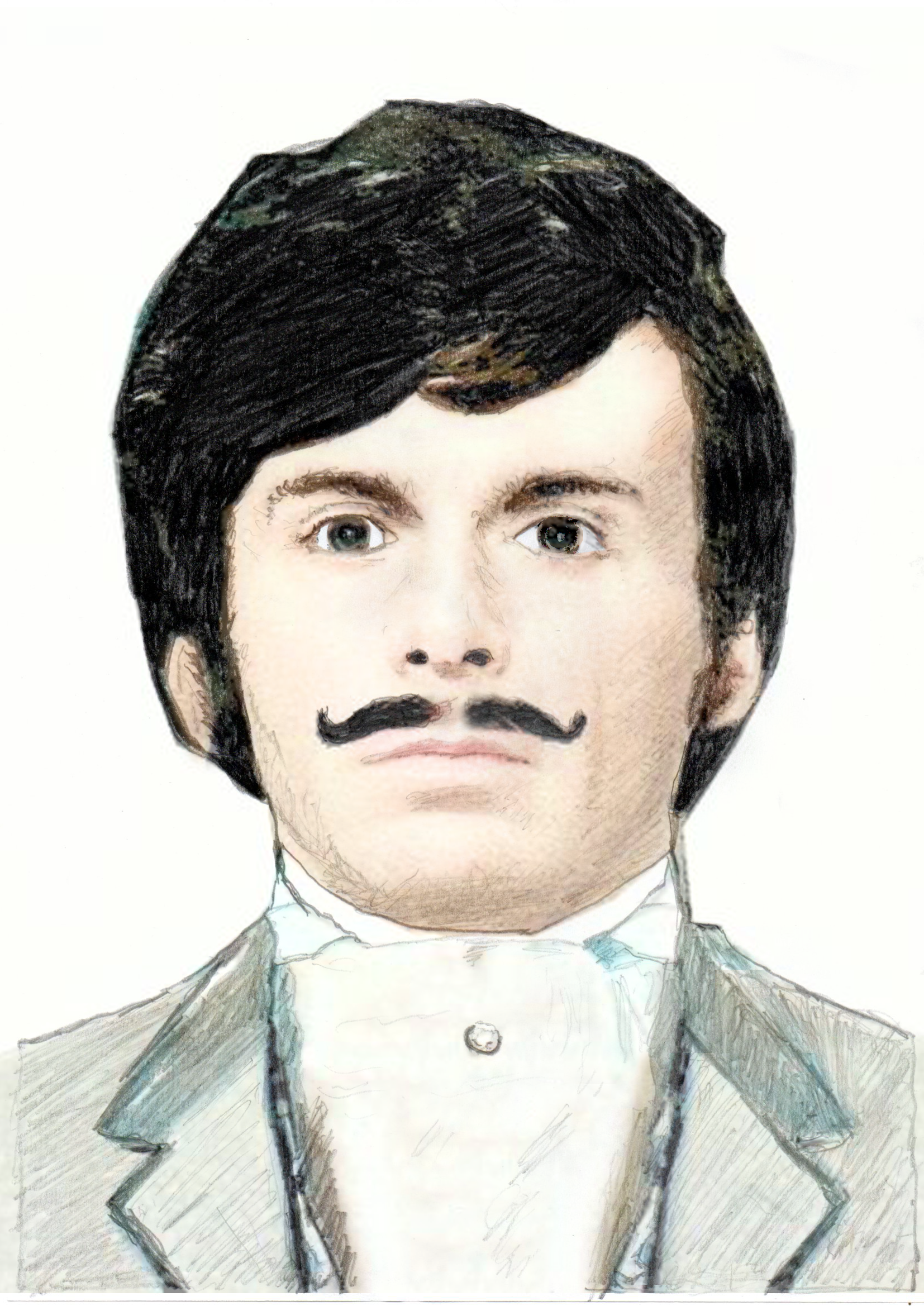
- A portrait of Alane in 1969
- Born: Bernard Noël Vetel; 25 December 1948 (age 77); Paris, France
- Occupations: Actor; singer
- Years active: 1962–present

Bernard Alane (born Bernard Noël Vetel; 25 December 1948) is a French actor and singer. He is the son of actress Annick Alane. He is best known in France for his roles in two films directed by Edouard Molinaro, Hibernatus and Mon oncle Benjamin, but has achieved better fame as a voice actor. He is the regular French voice of Stanley Tucci.

== Theater ==
Year	Title	Author	Director	Notes
1962	The Merry Wives of Windsor	William Shakespeare	Guy Lauzin	
1967	Pygmalion	George Bernard Shaw	Pierre Franck	
1968	Romeo and Juliet	William Shakespeare	Michael Cacoyannis	
1969	George et Margaret	Marc-Gilbert Sauvajon	Jacques-Henri Duval	
1970	The Merry Wives of Windsor	William Shakespeare	Jacques Fabbri	
1970	C'est malin	Fulbert Janin	Jacques Fabbri (2)	
1970	Aux quatre coins	Jean Marsan	Jean-Pierre Darras	
1971	Poverty and Nobility	Eduardo Scarpetta	Jacques Fabbri (3)	
1971	La lune est bleue	Hugh Herbert	René Clermont	
1971	Pauvre France	Ron Clark & Sam Bobrick	Michel Roux	
1972	Le Bourgeois gentilhomme	Molière	Jean-Louis Barrault	
1972	Adorable Julia	Marc-Gilbert Sauvajon	René Clermont (2)	
1973	Le Médecin volant	Molière	Francis Perrin	
1973	Tartuffe	Molière	Jacques Charon	
1973	Les Fourberies de Scapin	Molière	Jacques Échantillon	
1973	Un fil à la patte	Georges Feydeau	Jacques Charon (2)	
1974	Le Péril bleu ou Méfiez-vous des autobus	Victor Lanoux	Victor Lanoux	
1974	Citron automatique	Francis Perrin	Francis Perrin (2)	
1974	La Parisienne	Henry Becque	René Clermont (3)	
1974	La Grande Roue	Guillaume Hanoteau	Jacques Mauclair	
1975	La Mandragore	Roland Jouve	Jacques Ardouin	
1978	Almira	Pierre-Jean de San Bartholomé	Pierre-Jean de San Bartholomé	
1978	L'Amant de cœur	Louis Verneuil	Robert Manuel	
1979	The Philanthropist	Christopher Hampton	Michel Fagadau	
1979	Zadig	Voltaire	Jean-Louis Barrault (2)	
1979	The Train for Venice	Louis Verneuil & Georges Berr	Robert Manuel (2)	
1980	Les Bons Bourgeois	René de Obaldia	Jacques Rosny	
1982	The Importance of Being Earnest	Oscar Wilde	Pierre Boutron	
1984	Nono	Sacha Guitry	Robert Manuel (3)	
1984	Georges Courteline au travail	Sacha Guitry	Robert Manuel (4)	
1984	Boubouroche	Georges Courteline	Robert Manuel (5)	
1984	William Ier	Jean-François Prévand & Sarah Sanders	Jean-François Prévand	
1985	Gigi	Colette	Jean Meyer	
1988	Si jamais je te pince !	Eugène Marin Labiche	Philippe Rondest	
1989	Opérette	Witold Gombrowicz	Jorge Lavelli	Musical
1991	Peter Pan	Carolyn Leigh	Alain Marcel	Musical
1992	La Jalousie	Sacha Guitry	Jean-Claude Brialy	Nominated – Molière Award for Best Supporting Actor
1993	Kiss Me, Kate	Samuel and Bella Spewack	Alain Marcel (2)	Musical
1996	Sylvia	A. R. Gurney	Lars Schmidt	Nominated – Molière Award for Best Supporting Actor
1998	An Ideal Husband	Oscar Wilde	Adrian Brine	
1998	The Seagull	Anton Tchekhov	Christophe Lidon	
1999	La Cage aux Folles	Harvey Fierstein	Alain Marcel (3)	Musical
2000	Le Sire de Vergy	Gaston Arman de Caillavet & Robert de Flers	Alain Sachs	
2000	La Chauve-Souris	Johann Strauss II	Coline Serreau	Musical
2002	Le Dindon	Georges Feydeau	Francis Perrin (3)	
2004	Les Bonniches	Daniel Besse	Alain Sachs (2)	
2004	Viva l'Opéra (Comique)	Benoît Duteurtre	Robert Fortune	Musical
2006	Romance	David Mamet	Pierre Laville	
2008	Héloïse	Patrick Cauvin	Patrice Leconte	
2009–10	Les Dames du jeudi	Loleh Bellon	Christophe Lidon (2)	
2011	Pour l'amour de Gérard Philipe	Pierre Notte	Pierre Notte	
2012	La belle Hélène	Jacques Offenbach	Shirley and Dino	
2013	Bedroom Farce	Alan Ayckbourn	Jean-Luc Moreau	
2014	C'est noël tant pis	Pierre Notte	Pierre Notte (2)	
2016	L’impresario de Smyrne	Carlo Goldoni	Christophe Lidon (3)	

== Filmography ==
Year	Title	Role	Director	Notes
1967	Par mesure de silence	Jean Loup	Philippe Ducrest	TV movie
1969	Hibernatus	Paul Fournier	Édouard Molinaro	
1969	My Uncle Benjamin	Hector de Pont-Cassé	Édouard Molinaro (2)	
1970	Les saintes chéries	Jean-Jacques Servan de la Chatellerie	Jean Becker	TV series (2 episodes)
1971	Tartuffe	Valère	Marcel Cravenne	TV movie
1971	La belle aventure	Valentin Le Barroyer	Jean Vernier	TV movie
1973	Byron libérateur de la Grèce ou Le jardin des héros	Stephen Barnes	Pierre Bureau	TV movie
1973	La porteuse de pain	Clément Labroue	Marcel Camus	TV mini-series
1973	Molière pour rire et pour pleurer	La Grange	Marcel Camus (2)	TV mini-series
1973	Joseph Balsamo	Philippe von Taverney	André Hunebelle	TV mini-series
1975	La fleur des pois	Lolotte Charançon	Raymond Rouleau	TV movie
1975	Au bois dormant	Aurélien	Pierre Badel	TV movie
1975	Les compagnons d'Eleusis	Vincent	Claude Grinberg	TV series (30 episodes)
1976	Dracula and Son	Jean	Édouard Molinaro (2)	
1976	Le siècle des lumières	Denis Diderot	Claude Brulé	TV movie
1977	Parisian Life	Raoul de Gardefeu	Christian-Jaque	
1977	Commissaire Moulin	The Judge	Jacques Trébouta	TV series (1 episode)
1978	Violette Nozière	Pinguet's Son	Claude Chabrol	
1978	Amours sous la révolution	Camille Desmoulins	Jean-Paul Carrère	TV mini-series
1978	Les folies Offenbach	Alphonse	Michel Boisrond	TV mini-series
1980	Le coq de Bruyère	Doctor Stirling	Gabriel Axel	TV movie
1980	Histoires étranges	Bertrand	Pierre Badel (2)	TV mini-series
1980	Les amours des années folles	Stéphane Neyrial	Gérard Espinasse	TV series (1 episode)
1980	Le petit théâtre d'Antenne 2	Him	Jérôme Habans	TV series (1 episode)
1982	Qu'est-ce qu'on attend pour être heureux!	The product manager	Coline Serreau	
1982	Le soulier de satin	Don Camille / Mendès Léal	Alexandre Tarta	TV movie
1982	Le petit théâtre d'Antenne 2	Jeff	Jérôme Habans (2)	TV series (1 episode)
1983	L'été de nos quinze ans	Hubert	Marcel Jullian	
1983	Les amours romantiques	Fernand du Luc	Josée Dayan	TV series (1 episode)
1985	The Satin Slipper	The viceroy of Naples	Manoel de Oliveira	
1985	Les amours des années 50	Daniel	Philippe Galardi	TV series (1 episode)
1986	Le goûter chez Niels		Didier Martiny	Short
1986	Des toques et des étoiles	Albert Laparde	Roger Pigaut	TV mini-series
1987	Passe-temps	Diane's husband	José-Maria Berzosa	TV movie
1987	La baleine blanche	Rodolphe	Jean Kerchbron	TV movie
1991	Faux frère		Vincent Martorana	TV Short
1991	Bergerac	Henri	Tristan de Vere Cole	TV series (1 episode)
1992	Les amies de ma femme	Toucasse	Didier Van Cauwelaert	
1992	L'arrière-pensée		Henri-Louis Poirier	Short
1992	Imogène	Col. Bourelon	Thierry Chabert	TV series (1 episode)
1993	La dame de lieudit	Demos	Philippe Monnier	TV movie
1994	Cherche famille désespérément	Georges	François Luciani	TV movie
1994	Ferbac	André-Marie Ponceau	Sylvain Madigan	TV series (1 episode)
1995	V'la l'cinéma ou le roman de Charles Pathé	Émile	Jacques Rouffio	TV movie
1995	Comment épouser un héritage ?	The sub-prefect	Patrice Ambard	TV movie
1995	Nestor Burma	Robert Roy	Jean-Paul Mudry	TV series (1 episode)
1995	Le JAP, juge d'application des peines	Brucker	Joël Séria	TV series (1 episode)
1995	Extrême limite		Laurent Levy	TV series (1 episode)
1996	L'échappée belle	Georges	Étienne Dhaene	
1996	Sur un air de mambo	Jérôme	Jean-Louis Bertucelli	TV movie
1996	La vie avant tout	Jean	Miguel Courtois	TV movie
1997	Un étrange héritage	Henri Castel-Fortin	Laurent Dussaux	TV movie
1997	Les Cordier, juge et flic	Doctor Bréaud	Alain Wermus	TV series (1 episode)
1998	The Dinner Game	Pascal Meneaux's Voice	Francis Veber	
1998	Le baiser sous la cloche	Father Superior	Emmanuel Gust	TV movie
1998	Docteur Sylvestre	Dr. Galland	Jacob Berger	TV series (1 episode)
2001	Read My Lips	Morel	Jacques Audiard	
2001	L'aîné des Ferchaux	The Minister	Bernard Stora	TV movie
2002	In My Skin	The client	Marina de Van	
2002	Le miroir d'Alice	Doctor Launay	Marc Rivière	TV movie
2002	La crim'	Jacques Bouvier	Denis Amar	TV series (1 episode)
2003	Père et maire	Georges Touraine	Marc Rivière (2)	TV series (1 episode)
2003	Les Cordier, juge et flic	Simon Hennequin	Jean-Marc Seban	TV series (1 episode)
2004	La lune viendra d'elle-même	Bernard	Marie–Jan Seille	
2004	Haute coiffure	Charles Lefevre	Marc Rivière (3)	TV movie
2005	Espace détente	The President	Yvan Le Bolloc'h & Bruno Solo	
2005	Le juge est une femme	Philippe Delmont	Jean-Marc Seban (2)	TV series (1 episode)
2006	Le dernier épisode de Dallas	René	Guillaume Husson	Short
2006	Le Grand Charles	Paul Ramadier	Bernard Stora (2)	TV series (2 episodes)
2007	L'offre et la demande	The Forensic	Frédéric Farrucci	Short
2007	Le fantôme du lac	Doctor Duval	Philippe Niang	TV movie
2007	L'affaire Sacha Guitry	Me Paul Delzons	Fabrice Cazeneuve	TV movie
2008	Agathe Cléry	Philippe Guinard	Étienne Chatiliez	
2009–present	Commissaire Magellan	Paul Gavrillac	Several	TV series (19 episodes)
2010	Donnant, donnant	Doctor Harvey	Isabelle Mergault	
2010	Contes et nouvelles du XIXème siècle	Monsieur Mulot	Olivier Schatzky	TV series (1 episode)
2012	Camping paradis	Bertrand	Eric Duret & Jean-Marc Seban (3)	TV series (1 episode)
2013	15 jours ailleurs	Professor Leonetti	Didier Bivel	TV movie
2015	Pierre Brossolette ou les passagers de la lune	Charles de Gaulle	Coline Serreau (2)	TV movie

== Dubbing ==
Year	Title	Role	Actor	Director	Notes
1971	Willy Wonka & the Chocolate Factory	Bill	Aubrey Woods	Mel Stuart	2nd dubbing
1976	Logan's Run	Francis 7	Richard Jordan	Michael Anderson	
1978	Watership Down	Fiver	Richard Briers	Martin Rosen	
1981	Dragonslayer	Galen Bradwarden	Peter MacNicol	Matthew Robbins	
1982	Tron	Ram	Dan Shor	Steven Lisberger	
1982	Grease 2	Michael Carrington	Maxwell Caulfield	Patricia Birch	
1983	Breathless	Sgt. Enright	Robert Dunn	Jim McBride	
1985	Brazil	Jack Lint	Michael Palin	Terry Gilliam	
1985	Police Academy 2: Their First Assignment	Officer Eugene Tackleberry	David Graf	Jerry Paris	
1989	Babar: The Movie	Pompadour	Stephen Ouimette	Alan Bunce	
1990	The Sheltering Sky	Port Moresby	John Malkovich	Bernardo Bertolucci	
1991	Rover Dangerfield	Rover Dangerfield	Rodney Dangerfield	James L. George & Bob Seeley	
1992	Aladdin	Peddler	Robin Williams	Ron Clements & John Musker	
1993	The Three Musketeers	Athos	Kiefer Sutherland	Stephen Herek	
1993	David Copperfield	Edward Murdstone	Michael York	Don Arioli	
1993–99	The Nanny	Niles	Daniel Davis	Several	TV series (145 episodes)
1994	Corrina, Corrina	Manny Singer	Ray Liotta	Jessie Nelson	
1994	The Ref	Lloyd	Kevin Spacey	Ted Demme	
1994	Ed Wood	Bunny Breckinridge	Bill Murray	Tim Burton	
1994	The Adventures of Priscilla, Queen of the Desert	Anthony Belrose/Mitzi Del Bra	Hugo Weaving	Stephan Elliott	
1994	Swimming with Sharks	Buddy Ackerman	Kevin Spacey	George Huang	
1994	The Land Before Time II: The Great Valley Adventure	Strut	Rob Paulsen	Roy Allen Smith	
1994	The Return of Jafar	Peddler	Robin Williams	Tad Stones & Alan Zaslove	
1995	Seven	John Doe	Kevin Spacey	David Fincher	
1996	Muppet Treasure Island	Long John Silver	Tim Curry	Brian Henson	
1996	Emma	Mr. George Elton	Alan Cumming	Douglas McGrath	
1996	The English Patient	Peter Madox	Julian Wadham	Anthony Minghella	
1996	Restoration	John Pearce	David Thewlis	Michael Hoffman	
1996	Basquiat	Andy Warhol	David Bowie	Julian Schnabel	
1996	Shine	David Helfgott	Geoffrey Rush	Scott Hicks	
1996	Aladdin and the King of Thieves	Peddler	Robin Williams	Tad Stones	
1996	The Hunchback of Notre Dame	Clopin Trouillefou & Victor	Paul Kandel & Charles Kimbrough	Gary Trousdale & Kirk Wise	
1996	James and the Giant Peach	Mr. Grasshopper	Simon Callow	Henry Selick	
1996	The X-Files	Agent	Dan Zukovic	James Wong	TV series (1 episode)
1996–2000	The Pretender	Sydney Green	Patrick Bauchau	Several	TV series (86 episodes)
1997	Seven Years in Tibet	Peter Aufschnaiter	David Thewlis	Jean-Jacques Annaud	
1997	Pooh's Grand Adventure: The Search for Christopher Robin	Owl	Andre Stojka	Karl Geurs	
1998	Meet the Deedles	Phil Deedle	Paul Walker	Steve Boyum	
1998	Urban Legend	Professor Wexler	Robert Englund	Jamie Blanks	
1998	The Mask of Zorro	Don Rafael Montero	Stuart Wilson	Martin Campbell	
1998	American History X	Murray	Elliott Gould	Tony Kaye	
1998	Pocahontas II: Journey to a New World	The jester	Corey Burton	Tom Ellery & Bradley Raymond	
1998	Buster & Chauncey's Silent Night	Duke of Raoche	Paul Kandel	Buzz Potamkin	
1998	A Bug's Life	Slim	David Hyde Pierce	John Lasseter	
1998–2000	Der Clown	Führmann	Andreas Schmidt-Schaller	Several	TV series (15 episodes)
1999	The Mummy	Dr. Allen Chamberlain	Jonathan Hyde	Stephen Sommers	
1999	Stuart Little	Snowbell	Nathan Lane	Rob Minkoff	
1999	The End of the Affair	Henry Miles	Stephen Rea	Neil Jordan	
1999	RKO 281	Herman J. Mankiewicz	John Malkovich	Benjamin Ross	
1999	My Neighbors the Yamadas	Narrator	David Ogden Stiers	Isao Takahata	
2000	A Rumor of Angels	Nathan Neubauer	Ray Liotta	Peter O'Fallon	
2000	Picking Up the Pieces	Father LaCage	Elliott Gould	Alfonso Arau	
2000	The Patriot	Colonel Harry Burwell	Chris Cooper	Roland Emmerich	
2000	The Tigger Movie	Owl	Andre Stojka	Jun Falkenstein	
2001	Cats & Dogs	Mr. Tinkles	Sean Hayes	Lawrence Guterman	
2001	Blow Dry	Tony	Warren Clarke	Paddy Breathnach	
2001	The Mexican	Bernie Nayman	Bob Balaban	Gore Verbinski	
2001	What's the Worst That Could Happen?	Walter Greenbaum	Richard Schiff	Sam Weisman	
2001	Call Me Claus	Ralph	Taylor Negron	Peter Werner	TV movie
2001	The New Adventures of Lucky Luke	Several	Several	Several	TV series (10 episodes)
2001–2002	Six Feet Under	Robbie	Joel Brooks	Several	TV series (7 episodes)
2002	John Q.	Chief Gus Monroe	Ray Liotta	Nick Cassavetes	
2002	Unconditional Love	Dirk Simpson	Rupert Everett	P. J. Hogan	
2002	Frida	Leon Trotsky	Geoffrey Rush	Julie Taymor	
2002	Stuart Little 2	Snowbell	Nathan Lane	Rob Minkoff	
2002	Treasure Planet	Delbert Doppler	David Hyde Pierce	Ron Clements & John Musker	
2002	The Princess and the Pea	Laird	Ronan Vibert	Mark Swan	
2002	Disney's PK: Out of the Shadows	Computer			Video game
2002	Crossing Jordan	Curt Schneider	Robert LuPone	Nick Gomez & Allan Arkush	TV series (2 episodes)
2002–present	Unter Verdacht	Dr. Claus Reiter	Gerd Anthoff	Several	TV series (24 episodes)
2003	The Core	Dr Conrad Zimsky	Stanley Tucci	Jon Amiel	
2003	Pirates of the Caribbean: The Curse of the Black Pearl	Mullroy	Angus Barnett	Gore Verbinski	
2003	Elf	Buddy the Elf	Will Ferrell	Jon Favreau	
2003	Piglet's Big Movie	Owl	Andre Stojka	Francis Glebas	
2004	Garfield: The Movie	Happy Chapman	Stephen Tobolowsky	Peter Hewitt	
2004	Crash Twinsanity	Doctor Nefarious Tropy & Victor	Michael Ensign & Quinton Flynn		Video game
2004	The West Wing	Dr. Max Milkman	Stephen Tobolowsky	Alex Graves	TV series (1 episode)
2004	Agatha Christie's Marple	Rev. Leonard Clement	Tim McInnerny	Charles Palmer	TV series (1 episode)
2004–2005	Monster	Inspector Heinrich Lunge	Tsutomu Isobe	Masayuki Kojima	TV series (24 episodes)
2004–2008	The Batman	Ventriloquist	Dan Castellaneta	Several	TV series (3 episodes)
2005	Kingdom of Heaven	The Knights Hospitaller	David Thewlis	Ridley Scott	
2005	Casanova	Paprizzio	Oliver Platt	Lasse Hallström	
2005	The Exorcism of Emily Rose	Karl Gunderson	Colm Feore	Scott Derrickson	
2005	Wedding Crashers	Chazz Reinhold	Will Ferrell	David Dobkin	
2005	Robots	Crank Casey	Drew Carey	Chris Wedge	
2005	Stuart Little 3: Call of the Wild	Snowbell	Kevin Schon	Audu Paden	
2005	Chicken Little	Principal Fetchit	Wallace Shawn	Mark Dindal	
2005	McBride: The Doctor Is Out... Really Out	Harry Evers	Stephen Tobolowsky	John Larroquette	TV movie
2005	Revelations	Dr. Daniel Goran	Patrick Bauchau	Lili Fini Zanuck & Lesli Linka Glatter	TV mini-series
2005	House	Dr. Rowan Chase	Patrick Bauchau	Daniel Sackheim	TV series (1 episode)
2005–2006	Deadwood	Hugo Jarry	Stephen Tobolowsky	Several	TV series (9 episodes)
2005–2006	Space Goofs	Etno Polino	Maurice LaMarche	Several	TV series (52 episodes)
2005–2010	24	President Charles Logan	Gregory Itzin	Several	TV series (44 episodes)
2006	The Devil Wears Prada	Nigel	Stanley Tucci	David Frankel	
2006	The Illusionist	Crown Prince Leopold	Rufus Sewell	Neil Burger	
2006	Letters from Iwo Jima	Tadamichi Kuribayashi	Ken Watanabe	Clint Eastwood	
2006	The Prestige	Nikola Tesla	David Bowie	Christopher Nolan	
2006	Asterix and the Vikings	Cacofonix	Jess Harnell	Stefan Fjeldmark & Jesper Møller	
2006	U	Baba		Serge Élissalde & Grégoire Solotareff	
2006	Kingdom Hearts II	Several	Several	Tetsuya Nomura	Video game
2006	Monk	David Ruskin	Stanley Tucci	Randall Zisk	TV series (1 episode)
2006	Desperate Housewives	Harvey Bigsby	Brian Kerwin	David Grossman & Larry Shaw	TV series (2 episodes)
2006	Alias	Dr. Aldo Desantis	Patrick Bauchau	Jay Torres & Tucker Gates	TV series (2 episodes)
2006–2007	Big Day	The Garf	Stephen Tobolowsky	Several	TV series (6 episodes)
2006–2007	ER	Dr. Kevin Moretti	Stanley Tucci	Several	TV series (10 episodes)
2006–2008	Shaggy & Scooby-Doo Get a Clue!	Dr. Phineus Phibes	Jeff Bennett	Several	TV series (12 episodes)
2006–2009	Stargate Atlantis	Richard Woolsey	Robert Picardo	Several	TV series (26 episodes)
2007	Pirates of the Caribbean: At World's End	Mullroy	Angus Barnett	Gore Verbinski	
2007	Hot Fuzz	Martin Blower	David Threlfall	Edgar Wright	
2007	The Pursuit of Happyness	Walter Ribbon	Kurt Fuller	Gabriele Muccino	
2007	Shrek the Third	Merlin	Eric Idle	Chris Miller & Raman Hui	
2007	Tous à l'Ouest	Averell Dalton	Bernard Alane	Olivier Jean-Marie	
2007	A Family Lost	Steve Walsh	Daniel Roebuck	John Fasano	TV movie
2007	Boston Legal	Dr. Alvin Azinabinacroft	Stephen Tobolowsky	Michael Pressman	TV series (1 episode)
2007	Raines	Wally Anderson	Stephen Tobolowsky	Félix Enríquez Alcalá	TV series (1 episode)
2007	John from Cincinnati	Mark Lewinsky	Stephen Tobolowsky	John McNaughton, Jeremy Podeswa & Jesse Bochco	TV series (3 episodes)
2007	Out of Jimmy's Head	Golly Gopher	Carlos Alazraqui	Several	TV series (20 episodes)
2007	Mandarine and Cow	Cow	Bernard Alane	Several	TV series (156 episodes)
2007–2008	Heroes	Bob Bishop	Stephen Tobolowsky	Several	TV series (11 episodes)
2007–2015	Lewis	Inspector Lewis	Kevin Whately	Several	TV series (42 episodes)
2008	Powder Blue	Jack Doheny	Ray Liotta	Timothy Linh Bui	
2008	Mamma Mia !	Sam Carmichael	Pierce Brosnan	Phyllida Lloyd	
2008	Easy Virtue	Lord Hurst	Pip Torrens	Stephan Elliott	
2008	Wild Child	Mr. Christopher	Nick Frost	Nick Moore	
2008	In Bruges	Harry Waters	Ralph Fiennes	Martin McDonagh	
2008	The Bank Job	Tim Everett	Richard Lintern	Roger Donaldson	
2008	Married Life	Harry Allen	Chris Cooper	Ira Sachs	
2008	Impy's Island	Dr. Zonderburgh	Christoph Maria Herbst	Reinhard Klooss & Holger Tappe	
2008	Beethoven's Big Break	Sal DeMarco	Stephen Tobolowsky	Mike Elliott	TV movie
2008	CSI: Crime Scene Investigation	Spencer Freiberg	Stephen Tobolowsky	Alec Smight	TV series (1 episode)
2008	Magic	Monsignor Toad	Bernard Alane	Several	TV series (26 episodes)
2009	Julie & Julia	Paul Cushing Child	Stanley Tucci	Nora Ephron	
2009	The Time Traveler's Wife	Dr. David Kendrick	Stephen Tobolowsky	Robert Schwentke	
2009	Crossing Over	Cole Frankel	Ray Liotta	Wayne Kramer	
2009	Arthur and the Revenge of Maltazard	Di Vinci	Bernard Alane	Luc Besson	
2009	Breaking Bad	Dr. Chavez	Harry Groener	Terry McDonough	TV series (1 episode)
2009	Wizards of Waverly Place	Alucard Van Heusen	J. D. Cullum	Victor Gonzalez & Mark Cendrowski	TV series (2 episodes)
2009	The Tudors	Sir Francis Bryan	Alan van Sprang	Ciaran Donnelly & Jeremy Podeswa	TV series (8 episodes)
2009–2011	Glee	Sandy Ryerson	Stephen Tobolowsky	Several	TV series (8 episodes)
2009–2012	Star Wars: The Clone Wars	Dr. Nuvo Vindi & Huyang	Michael York & David Tennant	Several	TV series (4 episodes)
2009–present	Feu vert	Dr. Zonderburgh	Ramsès	Several	Advertising
2009–present	Gaston	Yves Lebrac	Bernard Alane	Several	TV series (78 episodes)
2010	The Lovely Bones	George Harvey	Stanley Tucci	Peter Jackson	
2010	Easy A	Dill Penderghast	Stanley Tucci	Will Gluck	
2010	Burlesque	Sean	Stanley Tucci	Steve Antin	
2010	Cats & Dogs: The Revenge of Kitty Galore	Mr. Tinkles	Sean Hayes	Brad Peyton	
2010	Alice in Wonderland	Cheshire Cat	Stephen Fry	Tim Burton	
2010	Legend of the Guardians: The Owls of Ga'Hoole	Twilight	Anthony LaPaglia	Zack Snyder	
2010	Alpha and Omega	Paddy	Eric Price	Anthony Bell & Ben Gluck	
2010	Law & Order: Special Victims Unit	Edwin Adelson	Stephen Tobolowsky	Peter Leto	TV series (1 episode)
2010–2012	The Jungle Book	Kaa & Hathi	Joseph J. Terry & Phil Lollar	Several	TV series (38 episodes)
2010–present	Downton Abbey	Dr Richard Clarkson	David Robb	Several	TV series (34 episodes)
2010–present	Les Dalton	Averell Dalton	Bernard Alane	Several	TV series (195 episodes)
2011	Captain America: The First Avenger	Abraham Erskine	Stanley Tucci	Joe Johnston	
2011	The Son of No One	Captain Marion Mathers	Ray Liotta	Dito Montiel	
2011	The Lady	Michael Aris	David Thewlis	Luc Besson	
2011	New Year's Eve	Mr. Buellerton	Matthew Broderick	Garry Marshall	
2011	Kung Fu Panda 2	Lord Shen	Gary Oldman	Jennifer Yuh Nelson	
2011	Cars 2	Professor Zündapp	Thomas Kretschmann	John Lasseter	
2011	Winnie the Pooh	Owl	Craig Ferguson	Stephen Anderson & Don Hall	
2011	Star Wars: The Old Republic	Several	Several		Video game
2011	Kinect: Disneyland Adventures	Blue caterpillar			Video game
2011–2013	Drop Dead Diva	Geoff Hensley	Tom Nowicki	Jamie Babbit & Dwight H. Little	TV series (5 episodes)
2011–2014	Californication	Stu Beggs	Stephen Tobolowsky	Several	TV series (30 episodes)
2012	The Hunger Games	Caesar Flickerman	Stanley Tucci	Gary Ross	
2012	Margin Call	Eric Dale	Stanley Tucci	J. C. Chandor	
2012	Ted	Thomas Murphy	Matt Walsh	Seth MacFarlane	
2012	The Suicide Shop	Mishima Tuvache	Bernard Alane	Patrice Leconte	
2012	Little Brother, Big Trouble: A Christmas Adventure	Eddy	Jukka Rasila	Kari Juusonen & Jorgen Lerdam	
2012	Zambezia	Cecil	Richard E. Grant	Wayne Thornley	
2012	Die Heimkehr	August Staudenmeyer	August Zirner	Jo Baier	TV movie
2012–2013	Justified	Agent Jerry Barkley	Stephen Tobolowsky	Peter Werner	TV series (3 episodes)
2012–2015	The Mindy Project	Dr. Marc Shulman	Stephen Tobolowsky	Several	TV series (4 episodes)
2013	Jack the Giant Slayer	Lord Roderick	Stanley Tucci	Bryan Singer	
2013	The Hunger Games: Catching Fire	Caesar Flickerman	Stanley Tucci	Francis Lawrence	
2013	The Fifth Estate	James Boswell	Stanley Tucci	Bill Condon	
2013	The Last Exorcism Part II	Calder	David Jensen	Ed Gass-Donnelly	
2013	Saving Mr. Banks	Don DaGradi	Bradley Whitford	John Lee Hancock	
2013	Movie 43	Narrator	Phil Crowley	Several	
2013	Frozen	Duke of Weselton	Alan Tudyk	Chris Buck & Jennifer Lee	
2013	The House of Magic	M. Lawrence	Doug Stone	Ben Stassen & Jeremy Degruson	
2013	Behind the Candelabra	Liberace	Michael Douglas	Steven Soderbergh	TV movie
2013	Sly Cooper: Thieves in Time	Toothpick			Video game
2013	The Bible	Pontius Pilate	Greg Hicks	Crispin Reece & Christopher Spencer	TV mini-series
2014	Captain America: The Winter Soldier	Baron Strucker	Thomas Kretschmann	Russo brothers	
2014	Transformers: Age of Extinction	Joshua Joyce	Stanley Tucci	Michael Bay	
2014	The Hunger Games: Mockingjay – Part 1	Caesar Flickerman	Stanley Tucci	Francis Lawrence	
2014	A Little Chaos	Duke of Orléans	Stanley Tucci	Alan Rickman	
2014	Asterix: The Land of the Gods	Getafix	Bernard Alane	Alexandre Astier & Louis Clichy	
2014	Call of Duty: Advanced Warfare	Jonathan Irons	Kevin Spacey	Glen Schofield & Michael Condrey	Video game
2014	Assassin's Creed Rogue	French Soldier	Bernard Alane	Mikhail Lozanov, Spass Kroushkov & Martin Capel	Video game
2014	Wakfu	Atcham	Bernard Alane	Anthony Roux	TV series (2 episodes)
2015	Avengers: Age of Ultron	Baron Strucker	Thomas Kretschmann	Joss Whedon	
2015	Spy	Patrick	Michael McDonald	Paul Feig	
2015	The Hunger Games: Mockingjay – Part 2	Caesar Flickerman	Stanley Tucci	Francis Lawrence	
2015	Assassin's Creed Syndicate	Charles Dickens		Marc-Alexis Côté	Video game
