= Stoléru =

Stoléru is a surname. Notable people with the surname include:

- Josiane Stoléru, French actress, cousin of Lionel
- Lionel Stoléru (1937–2016), French politician and civil servant
