= Fabrice Luchini =

French stage and film actor (born 1951)

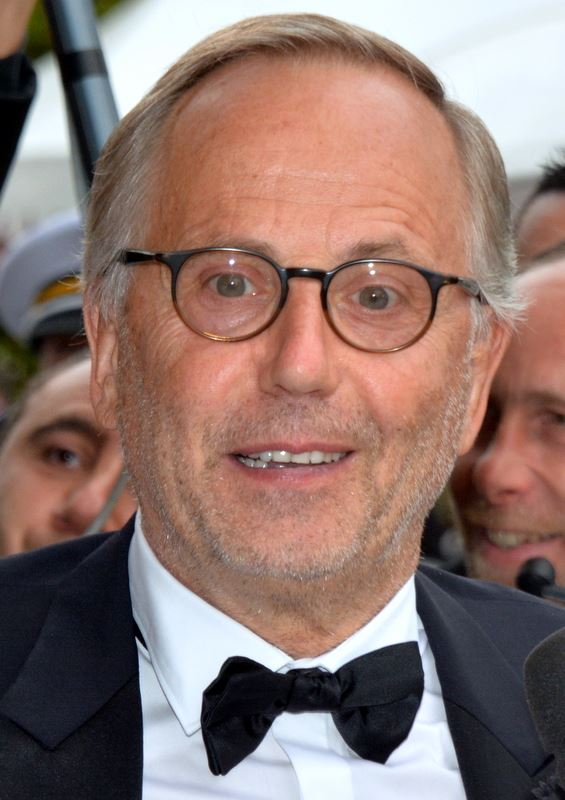
- Luchini at the 2016 Cannes Film Festival
- Born: Robert Luchini; 1 November 1951 (age 74); Paris, France
- Occupation: Actor
- Years active: 1969–present

Fabrice Luchini (French pronunciation: [fabʁis lykini]; born Robert Luchini; 1 November 1951) is a French stage and film actor. He has appeared in films such as Potiche, The Women on the 6th Floor, and In the House.

== Life and career ==
Fabrice Luchini was born in Paris, into an Italian immigrant family from Assisi who were greengrocers. He grew up around the neighbourhood of Goutte d'Or in Paris's 18th arrondissement. When he was 13, his mother apprenticed him to a hairdresser in a trendy parlour in Avenue Matignon, where he would take the name of the hairdresser's son, Fabrice, in place of his real name, Robert.

His first film role was in Tout peut arriver in 1969, directed by Philippe Labro. He then appeared in Éric Rohmer's Le Genou de Claire in 1970 playing a small role as an adolescent. He went on to appear in Rohmer's Perceval le Gallois and Les Nuits de la pleine lune, and also in films directed by Walerian Borowczyk, Nagisa Oshima, Claude Chabrol, Claude Lelouch, Cedric Klapisch and Édouard Molinaro. In 1990 he appeared in Christian Vincent's La Discrète.

For his role in the 2015 film Courted he won the Volpi Cup for Best Actor at the 72nd Venice International Film Festival.

== Filmography ==
=== Cinema ===
Year	Title	Role	Director	Notes
1969	Tout peut arriver	Fabrice	Philippe Labro	
1970	Claire's Knee	Vincent	Éric Rohmer	
1973	Valparaiso, Valparaiso		Pascal Aubier	
1974	Immoral Tales	André	Walerian Borowczyk	
1975	Ne	Fabrice	Jacques Richard	
1976	Vincent mit l'âne dans un pré (et s'en vint dans l'autre)	Vincent Vergne	Pierre Zucca	
1976	Les écrans déchirés	Fabrice	Jacques Richard	Short
1978	Violette Nozière	Camus	Claude Chabrol	
1979	Perceval le Gallois	Perceval	Éric Rohmer	
1980	Même les mômes ont du vague à l'âme	Arthur	Jean-Louis Daniel	
1981	The Aviator's Wife	Mercillat	Éric Rohmer	
1981	La forêt désenchantée		Jacques Robiolles	Short
1982	T'es folle ou quoi ?	Jean-François Sevran	Michel Gérard	
1982	Jimmy Jazz	Fabrice	Laurent Perrin	Short
1983	Zig Zag Story	Bob Hemler	Patrick Schulmann	
1983	Il ne faut jurer de rien	Fabrice	Christian Vincent	Short
1984	Emmanuelle 4	Oswaldo	Francis Leroi & Iris Letans	
1984	Full Moon in Paris	Octave	Éric Rohmer	
1985	Profs	Michel	Patrick Schulmann	
1985	Rouge-gorge	Frédéric	Pierre Zucca	
1986	Family Business	The shady lawyer	Costa-Gavras	
1986	Max mon amour	Nicolas	Nagisa Ōshima	
1986	Triple sec		Yves Thomas	Short
1987	Hôtel du Paradis	Arthur	Jana Boková	
1987	Les oreilles entre les dents	Luc Fabri	Patrick Schulmann	
1987	Four Adventures of Reinette and Mirabelle	The art dealer	Éric Rohmer	
1988	La couleur du vent	Serge	Pierre Granier-Deferre	
1988	Alouette, je te plumerai	Jacques	Pierre Zucca	
1990	Uranus	Jourdan	Claude Berri	
1990	La Discrète	Antoine	Christian Vincent	
1992	Riens du tout	Lepetit	Cédric Klapisch	
1992	The Return of Casanova	Camille	Édouard Niermans	
1993	Toxic Affair	The analyst	Philomène Esposito	
1993	Tout ça... pour ça !	Fabrice Lenormand	Claude Lelouch	
1993	The Tree, the Mayor and the Mediatheque	Marc Rossignol	Éric Rohmer	
1994	Colonel Chabert	Derville	Yves Angelo	
1995	L'année Juliette	Camille Prader	Philippe Le Guay	
1996	Beaumarchais	Pierre Beaumarchais	Édouard Molinaro	
1996	Men, Women: A User's Manual	Fabio Lini	Claude Lelouch	
1997	On Guard	Gonzague	Philippe de Broca	
1997	An Air So Pure	Magnus	Yves Angelo	
1999	No Scandal	Grégoire Jeancourt	Benoît Jacquot	
1999	Rien sur Robert	Didier Temple	Pascal Bonitzer	
2001	Barnie et ses petites contrariétés	Barnie	Bruno Chiche	
2003	The Cost of Living	Brett	Philippe Le Guay	
2004	Intimate Strangers	William	Patrice Leconte	
2005	La cloche a sonné	Simon Arcos	Bruno Herbulot	
2006	Jean-Philippe	Fabrice	Laurent Tuel	
2007	Molière	M. Jourdain	Laurent Tirard	
2008	Paris	Roland Verneuil	Cédric Klapisch	
2008	A Day at the Museum	A guardian	Jean-Michel Ribes	
2008	The Girl from Monaco	Bertrand Beauvois	Anne Fontaine	
2009	Points de vue	Narrator	Yona Friedman	Short
2010	Potiche	Robert Pujol	François Ozon	
2010	My Father's Guests	Arnaud Paumelle	Anne Le Ny	
2011	The Women on the 6th Floor	Jean-Louis Joubert	Philippe Le Guay	
2012	In the House	Germain Germain	François Ozon	
2012	Asterix and Obelix: God Save Britannia	Julius Caesar	Laurent Tirard	
2013	Bicycling with Molière	Serge Tanneur	Philippe Le Guay	
2014	Gemma Bovery	Martin Joubert	Anne Fontaine	
2014	Charly	Fabrice	Jourdan Lucente	Short
2015	Courted	Michel Racine	Christian Vincent	
2015	Un début prometteur	Francis Vauvel	Emma Luchini	
2016	Slack Bay	André van Peteghem	Bruno Dumont	
2018	A Man in a Hurry	Alain Wapler	Hervé Mimran	
2018	The Emperor of Paris	Joseph Fouché	Jean-François Richet	
2019	Joan of Arc	Charles VII of France	Bruno Dumont	
2019	Alice and the Mayor	Paul Théraneau	Nicolas Pariser	
2019	The Best Is Yet to Come	Arthur Dreyfus	Matthieu Delaporte & Alexandre de la Patellière	
2019	The Mystery of Henri Pick	Jean-Michel Rouche	Rémi Bezançon	
2023	La petite	Joseph Siprien	Guillaume Nicloux	
2023	The Crime Is Mine	Gustave Rabusset	François Ozon	
2023	Un homme heureux	Jean Leroy	Tristan Séguéla	
2024	The Empire	Belzébuth	Bruno Dumont	
2024	Marcello Mio	Fabrice	Christophe Honoré	

=== Television ===
Year	Title	Role	Director	Notes
1979	La chaine	Laurent	Claude Santelli	TV movie
1980	Fantômas	Bonardin	Juan Luis Buñuel & Claude Chabrol	TV mini-series
1981	Le beau monde	Jean-Pierre Davier	Michel Polac	TV movie
1986	Tous en boîte	Minimax	Charles Nemes	TV mini-series
1986	Série noire	Kowal	Maurice Dugowson	TV series (1 episode)
1988	L'argent du mur	Bernd	Jean-François Delassus	TV movie
1988	Série noire	Pastor	Yves Boisset	TV series (1 episode)
1989	Les nuits révolutionnaires	Le Huguenot	Charles Brabant	TV mini-series
1990	Six crimes sans assassin	Simon Lampias	Bernard Stora	TV movie
1994	Ne m'appelez pas ma petite	Thierry	Jean Becker	TV movie
1998	Art	Serge	Yves-André Hubert	TV movie
2017	Call My Agent!	Himself	Laurent Tirard	TV series (1 episode)
2023	Class Act	Marcel Loiseau	Tristan Séguéla	TV mini-series

== Theatre ==
- En attendant Godot (1978)
- Troïlus et Cressida (1979)
- De toutes les couleurs (1982)
- Voyage au bout de la nuit (1986)
- Le Veilleur de nuit (1986)
- La Valse du hasard (1986)
- Le Secret (1987)
- Voyage au bout de la nuit (1987)
- Voyage au bout de la nuit (1988)
- Une folie électrique (1989)
- Deux femmes pour un fantôme and La Baby-sitter (1990)
- La Société de chasse (1991)
- Partenaires (1993)
- « Art » (1994)
- Fabrice Luchini dit des textes de Baudelaire, Hugo, La Fontaine, Nietzsche (1996)
- Un cœur simple (1996)
- L’Arrivée à New-York (2000)
- Écoute mon ami (et autres textes de Louis Jouvet) (2002)
- Knock ou le triomphe de la médecine (2002)
- Fabrice Luchini dit des textes de La Fontaine, Nietzsche, Céline, Baudelaire (2005)
- Molly (2005)
- Le Point sur Robert (2006, 2007, 2008, 2009)
- Fabrice Luchini lit Philippe Muray (2010, 2011, 2012)
- La Fontaine (2011)
- Une heure de tranquillité (2013)

== Literature ==
- In 2010, Fabrice Luchini wrote the preface of two books: A la rencontre de Sacha Guitry, published by Editions Oxus, and Seul avec tous by Laurent Terzieff, published by Presses de la Renaissance.
- In 2011, he collaborated in a book by Philippe Muray, published by les Cahiers d'histoire de la philosophie (Editions du Cerf).
- Also in 2011, he released Fabrice Luchini lit fragments d'un discours amoureux through Audiolib.
- In 2012, he released Variations (La Fontaine & Baudelaire) on CD and DVD on Barclay / Universal Music France

== Awards and nominations ==
Year	Award	Nominated work	Result
1985	César Award for Best Supporting Actor	Full Moon in Paris	Nominated
1991	Prix Jean Gabin	La Discrète	Won
1991	César Award for Best Actor	La Discrète	Nominated
1993	César Award for Best Supporting Actor	The Return of Casanova	Nominated
1994	César Award for Best Supporting Actor	Tout ça... pour ça !	Won
1995	César Award for Best Supporting Actor	Colonel Chabert	Nominated
1997	César Award for Best Actor	Beaumarchais	Nominated
2002	Prix du Brigadier	Knock	Won
2007	Moscow International Film Festival - Best Actor	Molière	Won
2008	César Award for Best Supporting Actor	Molière	Nominated
2013	César Award for Best Actor	In the House	Nominated
2013	European Film Award for Best Actor	In the House	Nominated
2014	César Award for Best Actor	Bicycling with Molière	Nominated
2014	Globe de Cristal Award for Best Actor	Bicycling with Molière	Nominated
2015	Volpi Cup for Best Actor	Courted	Won
2016	César Award for Best Actor	Courted	Nominated
2016	Lumière Award for Best Actor	Courted	Nominated
2017	César Award for Best Actor	Slack Bay	Nominated
2020	Globe de Cristal Award for Best Actor - Comedy	The Mystery of Henri Pick	Nominated
2020	Lumière Award for Best Actor	Alice and the Mayor	Nominated
