= Qu'est-ce qu'on attend pour être heureux! =

- Directed by: Coline Serreau
- Written by: Coline Serreau
- Starring: Henri Garcin
- Cinematography: Jean-Noël Ferragut
- Edited by: Jacqueline Meppiel
- Music by: Jeff Cohen
- Release date: 1982
- Language: French

Qu'est-ce qu'on attend pour être heureux! (also known as What Are We Waiting for to Be Happy!) is a 1982 French comedy film written and directed by Coline Serreau and starring Henri Garcin.

The film was screened at the 39th edition of the Venice Film Festival.

== Cast ==
- Henri Garcin as The Film Director
- Évelyne Buyle as Jean Harlow
- Pierre Vernier as Rudolph Valentino
- Romain Bouteille as Joachim
- André Julien as M. Tiermond
- Annick Alane as Lulu
- Bernard Alane as The product manager
- Michel Berto as Mr. Everybody
- Laure Duthilleul as The dresser
- Elisabeth Wiener
- Tanya Lopert
