= 18 Years Later =

18 Years Later may refer to:

- 18 Years Later (2003 film), a French comedy film
- 18 Years Later (2010 film), an Italian comedy film
