= Parisian Life (1977 film) =

1977 film by Christian-Jaque

- Directed by: Christian-Jaque
- Written by: Ludovic Halévy (play); Henri Meilhac (play); Christian-Jaque; Jean-Loup Dabadie; Jacques Emmanuel
- Starring: Martine Sarcey; Evelyne Buyle; Dany Saval
- Cinematography: Michel Carré; Andréas Winding
- Edited by: Christine Monge; Michel Nézick; Geneviève Winding
- Music by: Jacques Offenbach; Pierre Porte; Philippe Sarde
- Production companies: Bavaria Atelier; Les Productions Belles Rives; RAI Radiotelevisione Italiana; Société Française de Production
- Release date: 14 December 1977
- Countries: France; Italy; West Germany
- Language: French

Parisian Life (French: La vie parisienne) is a 1977 musical comedy film directed by Christian-Jaque and starring Martine Sarcey, Evelyne Buyle and Dany Saval. A co-production between France, Italy and West Germany, it is based on the 1866 operetta La Vie parisienne by Jacques Offenbach.

It was partly shot at the Bavaria Studios in Munich.

== Cast ==
- Martine Sarcey as La baronne
- Evelyne Buyle as La Gantière: Gabrielle
- Dany Saval as Pauline
- Claire Vernet as Metella
- Jacques Balutin as Urbain
- Bernard Alane as Raoul de Gardefeu
- Georges Aminel as Le Brésilien
- Claudine Collas as Valentine
- Georges Croce as Bobinet
- Jean-Pierre Darras as Le baron
- Valentine Ducray as Léonie
- Christian Duvaleix as Le bottier Frick
- Jacques Dynam as Prosper
- Grégoire Gromoff as Igor
- Jacques Jouanneau as Alfred
- Jacques Legras as Alphonse
- Colin Mann as Worth
- Aurora Maris as Louise
- Jean-Claude Massoulier as Joseph
- Michèle Mellory as Clara
- Jean-Pierre Rambal as Hippolyte
- Olga Valéry as La duchesse

== Bibliography ==
- Goble, Alan. The Complete Index to Literary Sources in Film. Walter de Gruyter, 1999.
