= Série noire (1984 TV series) =

- Country of origin: France
- No. of episodes: 37

Production
- Running time: 90 minutes

Original release
- Network: TF1
- Release: 28 January 1984 – 28 August 1991

Série noire is a French crime television series created by Pierre Grimblat in 1984. The series was adapted from crime books by the publishing imprint of the same name. 37 episodes were filmed between 1984 and 1989, and were aired until 1991 on TF1.

== Guest stars ==
- Agnès Soral
- Alex Descas
- Artus de Penguern
- Bernard Farcy
- Colette Brosset
- Danièle Lebrun
- Dominique Pinon
- Évelyne Buyle
- Fabrice Luchini
- François Berléand
- Gérard Darmon
- Ginette Garcin
- Jean Benguigui
- Jean-François Stévenin
- Jean-Luc Bideau
- Jean-Pierre Castaldi
- Jean-Yves Berteloot
- Liliane Rovère
- Luc Béraud
- Mylène Demongeot
- Ronny Coutteure
- Rufus
- Suzanne Flon
- Véronique Genest
- Victor Lanoux
- Vincent Grass
