= Léo Hamon =

French politician

Léo Hamon (12 January 1908 – 27 October 1993, Paris) was a French politician. He was a member of the Popular Republican Movement and the Union for the Defence of the Republic. He was also a member of the fourth district of Essonne, senator of the Seine, a government spokesman and State Secretary of Participation and the Incentive. He was the father of actress Lucienne Hamon.
