= Camille Japy =

Belgian-French actress (born 1968)

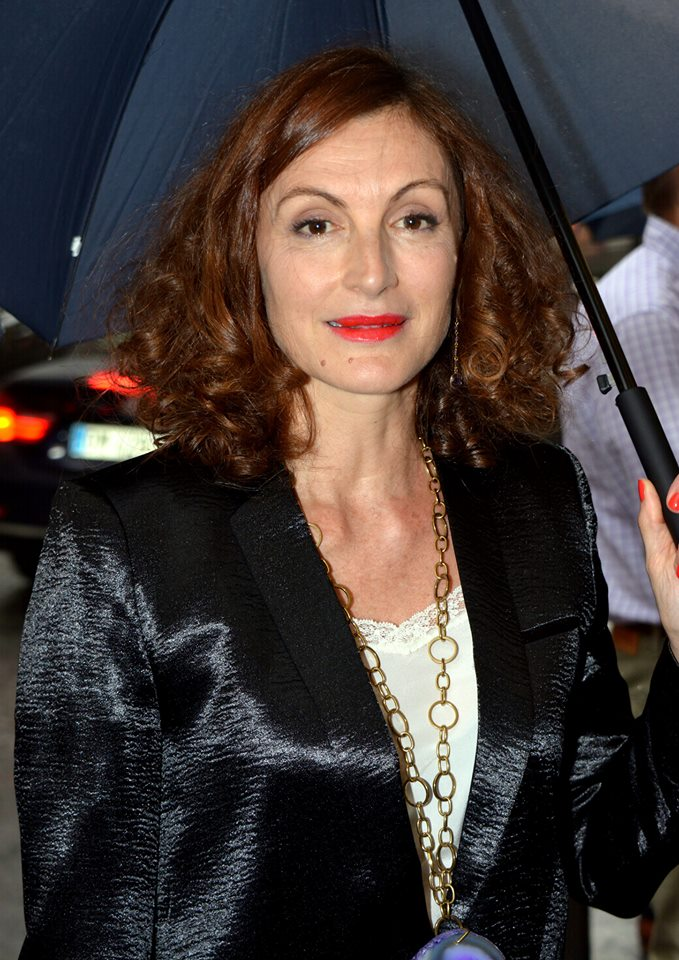
- Camille Japy in 2018
- Born: 7 September 1968 (age 57); Brussels, Belgium
- Occupation: Actress
- Years active: 1990-present

Camille Japy (born 7 September 1968) is a Belgian-French actress. She has appeared in more than seventy films since 1990.

== Selected filmography ==
Year	Title	Role	Notes
1999	Our Happy Lives	Emilie	
2003	The Cost of Living		
2005	Cold Showers		
2006	Odette Toulemonde	Nadine	
2007	La Vie d'artiste	Anabella	
2008	Taken	Isabelle	
2013	It Boy		
2014	Bicycling with Molière	Christine	
