= The Cost of Living (2003 film) =

- Theatrical release poster
- Directed by: Philippe Le Guay
- Written by: Philippe Le Guay; Jean-Francois Goyet
- Produced by: Anne-Dominique Toussaint
- Starring: Fabrice Luchini; Vincent Lindon
- Cinematography: Laurent Machuel
- Edited by: Martine Giordano
- Music by: Philippe Rombi
- Distributed by: Pathé Distribution
- Release date: 1 July 2003 (France)
- Running time: 100 minutes
- Country: France
- Language: French
- Budget: $5.8 million
- Box office: $6.3 million

The Cost of Living (French: Le Coût de la vie) is a 2003 French comedy film directed by Philippe Le Guay.

== Cast ==
- Fabrice Luchini - Brett
- Vincent Lindon - Coway
- Camille Japy - Milène
- Géraldine Pailhas - Helena
- Isild Le Besco - Laurence
- Lorànt Deutsch - Patrick
- Claude Rich - Maurice
- Bernard Bloch - Richet
- Catherine Hosmalin - Karine
- Chantal Neuwirth - Granny
