= The Women on the 6th Floor =

- Film poster
- Directed by: Philippe Le Guay
- Written by: Philippe Le Guay; Jérôme Tonnerre
- Produced by: Étienne Comar; Philippe Rousselet
- Starring: Fabrice Luchini; Sandrine Kiberlain; Natalia Verbeke; Carmen Maura
- Cinematography: Jean-Claude Larrieu
- Edited by: Monica Coleman
- Music by: Jorge Arriagada
- Distributed by: SND Films
- Release dates: 23 October 2010 (Première); 16 February 2011 (France)
- Running time: 106 minutes
- Country: France
- Languages: French; Spanish
- Budget: $7 million
- Box office: $27.5 million

The Women on the 6th Floor (French: Les Femmes du 6^{e} étage; also known as Service Entrance) is a 2010 French film directed and part-written by Philippe Le Guay. Principal roles are taken by Fabrice Luchini, Sandrine Kiberlain, Natalia Verbeke and Carmen Maura.

Set in Paris in 1962, the story alternates between two different worlds. One is a traditional wealthy family in a comfortable apartment, whose lives are devoted to making money and meaningless socialising. The other is the underpaid and overworked domestic servants living in cramped conditions above them. As few French people want such work, the jobs are taken by Spanish women, eager to escape the poverty and oppression of Francoist Spain, who bring with them their native solidarity and human warmth.

== Plot ==
Jean-Louis Joubert is a stockbroker living with his wife Suzanne, who does not work, in a large apartment. The family's French maid leaves after a dispute, so Suzanne goes to a church where the priest finds jobs for Spanish immigrants. There she hires María, young and pretty, who speaks French and is the niece of Concepción, the maid for another family in the same building.

The apartment is a mess after days without a maid and Concepción gets some of her Spanish friends to rally round and clean it up, to the surprise and delight of Suzanne. When Suzanne wants some furniture moved up to a little room on the 6th floor that they use for storage, Jean-Louis discovers that the other little rooms there, all unheated, are occupied by Spanish maids, including their María. There is only one cold water tap on the landing for them to wash themselves and one Turkish toilet that is forever getting blocked. He calls a plumber to fix the toilet and says that María can use their own bathroom. He also lets another maid come in to use their phone for an urgent call home.

Though he has been struck by María since first seeing her, he becomes a friend to the other women too and starts learning about Spanish language, life and culture. His wife Suzanne begins to worry, not about the maids who are mostly not young or beautiful and in any case are servants, but about a rich client of his called Bettina de Brossolettes who is a notorious maneater. When they have a cocktail party in their flat, she is dismayed after finding out that Bettina is invited. During the party Jean-Louis catches a hired waiter trying to kiss María and, furious, sacks him on the spot. The smirking waiter replies that he understands that María is “off limits,” implying that Jean-Louis has his own designs on her. Apparently worried that his affection for her has become too obvious, Jean-Louis seeks to distance himself by speaking to her harshly, prompting María to contemptuously reply that he is “just another boss” after all. She later reveals that she has a son in Spain by one of her former employers, and gave up the child for adoption.

Meanwhile Jean-Louis has found a new post for one of the Spanish women who was being abused by her husband; out of gratitude she invites him and all the other Spaniards to a paella party. When María turns up, she is furious to find Jean-Louis there and enjoying himself. Arriving home late to a furious Suzanne, he is accused of having been with Bettina. He says that he was and agrees to move out. Taking over the storeroom on the 6th floor, he is not only close to María but becomes more closely involved in the lives of the other women on the floor. He goes to their church on Sundays, a new experience for him, and takes some of them in his car for a pilgrimage to Lisieux.

Concepción is now worried that María will again fall for a man who will not marry her and, to stop any affair between the two, tells María where in Spain her son now is. María immediately tells Suzanne she is leaving to return to Spain and, going upstairs in an emotional state, lets Jean-Louis take her into his room and kiss her. She ends up spending the night with him and the next morning leaves for Spain. Jean-Louis is very hurt, not only because María did not tell him about leaving, but also because all the other women he thought were his friends were silent too about her departure.

Three years later, Jean-Louis drives to Spain looking for Concepción. When he tracks her down, she shows him the house that her husband is building, sends her husband to go get Pilar and the three of them have tea. Jean-Louis says that he and his wife have divorced and she met a successful artist. When Jean-Louis asks Concepción about Maria she claims she does not know where María is. However her husband, who recognises what Jean-Louis is feeling, secretly tells him. When he drives there, Maria is exiting her home with a basket of laundry and the neighbor women ask her about her daughter, she responds that she's feeling better. Jean-Louis follows María to the clothes line and when the two see each other their love for each other shows in their expressions.

== Cast ==
- Fabrice Luchini as Jean-Louis Joubert
- Sandrine Kiberlain as Suzanne Joubert
- Natalia Verbeke as María Gonzalez
- Carmen Maura as Concepción Ramirez
- Lola Dueñas as Carmen
- Berta Ojea as Dolores Carbalan
- Nuria Solé as Teresa
- Concha Galán as Pilar
- Audrey Fleurot as Bettina de Brossolette
- Marie-Armelle Deguy as Colette de Bergeret
- Muriel Solvay as Nicole de Grandcourt
- Philippe Duquesne as Gérard
- Annie Mercier as Madame Triboulet
- Michèle Gleizer as Germaine Bronech
- Camille Gigot as Bertrand Joubert
- Jean-Charles Deval as Olivier Joubert
- Christine Vézinet as Valentine
- Jeupeu as Boulard
- Vincent Nemeth as Monsieur Armand
- Philippe du Janerand as Piquer
- Patrick Bonnel as Golmard
- Laurent Claret as Blamond
- Jean-Claude Jay as Pelletier
- Joan Massotkleiner as Fernando
- Ivan Martin Salan as Miguel

== Production ==
Two of the Spanish actresses, Berta Ojea and Concha Galán, did not speak French before the film and learned their roles phonetically.

== Release ==
The film premièred at the Montpellier International Festival of Mediterranean Film on 23 October 2010 and its cinematic run in France began on 16 February 2011. First shown in the USA in March 2011 at Rendezvous with French Cinema, it began its release there on 7 October 2011. The film was screened out of competition at the Berlinale in 2011.

== Reception ==
It was well received by critics and audiences. Le Monde wrote "The entertainment is as good as the actors are pitch-perfect. Fabrice Luchini and Sandrine Kiberlain are among our best stars." Dissenting, La Croix described the "lazy screenplay, poor dialogue, catalogue of clichés, poor quality mise en scène". The New York Press reviewed the film at the Rendez-vous with French Film festival in New York, calling it "charming".

== Awards ==
The movie was nominated in three categories at the César Award 2012 : Best costume design, Best production design and Best supporting actress. It won the Best supporting actress César - Carmen Maura.

== Discography ==
The original soundtrack to Les Femmes du 6^{e} étage is included on the CD compilation Les Musiques de Jorge Arriagada pour les films de Philippe Le Guay, released by Canadian label Disques Cinémusique in 2013. French and English liner notes.
