= The Crime Is Mine =

- Release poster
- Directed by: François Ozon
- Written by: François Ozon
- Produced by: Éric Altmayer; Nicolas Altmayer
- Starring: Nadia Tereszkiewicz; Rebecca Marder; Isabelle Huppert; Fabrice Luchini; Dany Boon; André Dussollier
- Cinematography: Manuel Dacosse
- Edited by: Laure Gardette
- Music by: Philippe Rombi
- Production companies: Mandarin & Compagnie; FOZ; Gaumont; France 2 Cinéma; Playtime; Scope Pictures
- Distributed by: Gaumont
- Release dates: 21 January 2023 (Angers); 8 March 2023 (France)
- Running time: 102 minutes
- Country: France
- Language: French
- Budget: €13.7 million
- Box office: $10.4 million

The Crime Is Mine (French: Mon crime) is a 2023 French crime comedy film written and directed by François Ozon starring Nadia Tereszkiewicz, Rebecca Marder, Isabelle Huppert, Fabrice Luchini, Dany Boon, and André Dussollier. Set in the 1930s, the film follows an actress who gains notoriety after being acquitted of murder for self-defence. It is a loose adaptation of the 1934 play Mon crime by Georges Berr and Louis Verneuil, which has been adapted into two American films, True Confession (1937) and Cross My Heart (1946).

== Plot ==
In 1935 Paris the penniless Madeleine Verdier and Pauline Mauléon share a rundown attic flat – the former is a struggling actress and the latter a client-chasing lawyer. Madeleine goes to meet the theatre producer Montferrand, but she refuses his offer of a small role in a play in return for becoming his mistress. He tries to rape her, but she struggles, escapes and walks home.

There Madeleine is visited by her lover André Bonnard, whose father owns a large but failing tyre factory. André receives little financial support from his father and refuses to get a job, instead intending to resolve his and Madeleine's financial difficulties by making her his mistress whilst marrying a rich heiress. She had hoped that André would marry her and agree to get a job, and thus is ambivalent about the offer.

Inspector Brun of the National Police visits the two friends' apartment to tell them Montferrand has been murdered and that Madeleine is suspected. The friends leave for the cinema and Brun returns to the flat to seize a gun as evidence. The investigating judge Gustave Rabusset is quickly convinced of Madeleine's guilt. She initially denies it but changes her mind when Rabusset tells her that, if she can plead self-defence, she will not necessarily be found guilty.

Madeleine takes on Pauline as her lawyer and together they make the trial a symbol of men's oppression of women. Madeleine gives a very moving performance of an outraged closing speech written for her by Pauline and she is acquitted by an all-male jury to the applause of many women in the public gallery.

After her acquittal, Madeleine becomes a popular actress, winning the lead in the play in which Montferrand had offered her a small part, and Pauline a sought-after lawyer. They leave their miserable accommodation and move into a private hotel in Boulogne. André wants to give up his marriage to the rich heiress to marry Madeleine, but his father is against it.

Odette Chaumette, a former silent film actress who had been sidelined by the arrival of talkies, comes to meet the two women and explains to them that she killed Montferrand. She feels that Madeleine stole not only her crime but also the fame that came with it, but they refuse to pay her off to keep silent. Instead Odette goes to confess to Rabusset, but he has been promoted thanks to the success of his investigation and refuses to reopen the case, instead suggesting she confess to an unsolved case.

As Odette Chaumette continues to harass the two friends, Madeleine goes to see the architect Palmarède, who had concluded a life annuity with Montferrand just before his premature death and therefore earned a lot of money thanks to that death, initially making him a suspect. She convinces him to invest part of this money in André's father's business.

Madeleine and Pauline explain to André's father that Madeleine is not the murderer but still needs to appear so, especially to André. With Palmarède's tempting bailout and their own charm they convince him to support the marriage and pay off Odette. Odette is also given a part in Madeleine's play, which is rewritten to make her the sister rather than the mother of Madeleine's character. The rewrite also gives the play a new ending which reinterprets the murder of Montferrand as Odette shooting him to save Madeleine from being raped and then Madeleine firing the final fatal shot.

== Cast ==
- Nadia Tereszkiewicz as Madeleine Verdier
- Rebecca Marder as Pauline Mauléon
- Isabelle Huppert as Odette Chaumette
- Fabrice Luchini as Gustave Rabusset
- Dany Boon as Fernand Palmarède
- André Dussollier as M. Bonnard
- Édouard Sulpice as André Bonnard
- Régis Laspalès as Inspector Brun
- Olivier Broche as Léon Trapu
- Félix Lefebvre as Gilbert Raton
- Franck de Lapersonne as Pistole
- Evelyne Buyle as Simone Bernard
- Michel Fau as Maurice Vrai
- Daniel Prévost as M. Parvot
- Myriam Boyer as Madame Jus
- Jean-Christophe Bouvet as Montferrand
- Lucia Sanchez as Mme Alvarez
- Dominique Besnehard as Restaurant Head waiter

== Production ==
Ozon conceived of the film during the COVID-19 lockdowns. He described it as being "ultimately about the triumph of sorority". He said, "it ends with a play in the tradition of Jean Renoir. It's also a playful reference to The Last Metro by François Truffaut". Huppert's character was based on the actress Sarah Bernhardt. Other influences included "American screwball comedies from the 1930s", particularly films by Ernst Lubitsch and Frank Capra, as well as "the Paris of the 1930s viewed by the Americans, as in the film Victor/Victoria by Blake Edwards".

Filming took place from April to June 2022, in and around Paris and in Charleroi and Brussels, Belgium.

== Release ==
The film was screened for industry professionals on 10 January 2023 at Unifrance's Rendez-Vous with French Cinema showcase in Paris. It premiered as the opening film at the Festival Premiers Plans d'Angers on 21 January 2023.

== Reception ==
On the review aggregator website Rotten Tomatoes, 98% of 48 critics' reviews are positive, with an average rating of 7.3/10. The website's consensus reads: "With alluring razzmatazz, The Crime is Mine and its superlative stars will seduce farce lovers and Francophiles." Metacritic, which uses a weighted average, assigned the film a score of 74 out of 100, based on 9 critics, indicating "generally favorable" reviews.
