= 18 Years Later (2003 film) =

- French: 18 ans après
- Directed by: Coline Serreau
- Written by: Coline Serreau
- Produced by: Alain Sarde; Christine Gozlan
- Starring: André Dussollier; Michel Boujenah; Roland Giraud
- Cinematography: Jean-François Robin
- Edited by: Catherine Renault
- Music by: Coline Serreau
- Production companies: Les Films Alain Sarde; TF1 Films Production; Eniloc; StudioCanal; Studio Images 8
- Distributed by: BAC Films; StudioCanal
- Release dates: 5 February 2003 (France); 2 May 2003 (North America)
- Running time: 89 minutes
- Country: France
- Language: French
- Box office: $8,785,730

18 Years Later (French: 18 ans après) is a 2003 French comedy film that was written and directed by Coline Serreau. It is a sequel to Serreau's 1985 comedy film Three Men and a Cradle. The film received mixed reviews.

== Cast ==
- André Dussollier as Jacques
- Michel Boujenah as Michel
- Roland Giraud as Pierre
- Philippine Leroy-Beaulieu as Sylvia
- Madeleine Besson as Marie
- Line Renaud as Julie
- James Thierrée as Arthur
- Ken Samuels as John
- Gregoire Lavollay-Porter as Jack
- Lolita Chammah as Ludovica
- Nathanael Serreau as Amos

== Production and release ==
18 Years Later is the sequel to Serreau's 1985 comedy film Three Men and a Cradle. The film was directed and written by Coline Serreau. It was produced by Alain Sarde and Christine Gozlan with Les Films Alain Sarde, TF1 Films Production, Eniloc, StudioCanal, and distributed by BAC Films in France and StudioCanal internationally. It was filmed by Jean-François Robin and edited by Catherine Renault. Serreau wrote some of the music and selected the soundtrack. It was released on 5 February 2003 in France and 2 May 2003 in North America with a runtime of 89 minutes. It grossed $8,725,263 in France and $8,785,730 worldwide. The film was partially shot in Avignon.

== Critical reception ==
Lisa Nesselson in Variety wrote that although she found merit in the writing and acting of 18 Years Later, the digital video images were "so damn ugly they almost capsize an otherwise skillful piece of entertainment". For The Hollywood Reporter, Judith Prescott said that the film was "a gentle, engaging comedy that wisely avoids retreading old ground". Thierry Jobin, writing for Le Temps, gave the film a negative review. TV Magazine rated the movie three out of five stars.
