= The Mystery of Henri Pick =

2019 film

- Theatrical release poster
- French: Le Mystère Henri Pick
- Directed by: Rémi Bezançon
- Starring: Fabrice Luchini; Camille Cottin
- Edited by: Valérie Deseine
- Distributed by: Gaumont
- Release date: 24 February 2019
- Running time: 100 minutes
- Country: France
- Language: French
- Budget: $8 million
- Box office: $9.7 million

The Mystery of Henri Pick (French: Le Mystère Henri Pick) is a 2019 French comedy film directed by Rémi Bezançon, based on the novel of the same name by David Foenkinos.

== Plot ==
The film follows a literary critic as he investigates the mysterious author of a newly-published novel that has become a literary sensation, Last Hours of a Love Story. After a young publisher, Daphné Despero (Alice Isaaz), finds the novel in a library for rejected books in Brittany, she searches for the supposed author, Henri Pick, but finds out from his wife, Madeline Pick (Josiane Stoléru), and his daughter, Joséphine Pick (Camille Cottin) that he is a recently deceased owner of a former pizza shop.

A popular television-show literary critic, Jean-Michel Rouche (Fabrice Luchini), thinking it impossible that a simple pizza-maker from Brittany could have written a literary masterpiece, takes on the role of a detective and, with the help of Joséphine Pick, he explores the mystery of the novel's true authorship, unearthing the stories of many characters associated with the book's publication and the library of rejected books, attempting to resolve their motives in hiding their identity and their connections to the novel's content. After reading an earlier book by a young author, Daphné's partner Fred Koskas (Bastien Bouillon), which he was supposed to review on his show, Rouche has no doubt that Fred must have written Last Hours of a Love Story as well, solidifying his promise as an author. The film ends with Joséphine and Rouche discussing another author whose mystery follows similar circumstances.

== Cast ==
- Fabrice Luchini as Jean-Michel Rouche
- Camille Cottin as Joséphine Pick
- Alice Isaaz as Daphné Despero
- Bastien Bouillon as Fred Koskas
- Astrid Whettnall as Inès de Crécy
- Josiane Stoléru as Madeleine Pick
- Yulia Zimina as Professor
- Hanna Schygulla as Ludmila Blavitsky
- Annie Mercier as Bénédicte Le Floch
