= Bicycling with Molière =

2013 film by Philippe Le Guay

- Theatrical release poster
- French: Alceste à bicyclette
- Directed by: Philippe Le Guay
- Written by: Philippe Le Guay
- Produced by: Anne-Dominique Toussaint
- Starring: Fabrice Luchini; Lambert Wilson; Maya Sansa; Camille Japy; Ged Marlon; Stéphan Wojtowicz; Josiane Stoléru; Philippe Du Janerand; Annie Mercier; Christine Murillo
- Cinematography: Jean-Claude Larrieu
- Edited by: Monica Coleman
- Music by: Jorge Arriagada
- Production companies: Les Films des Tournelles; Pathé; Appaloosa Développement; France 2 Cinéma
- Distributed by: Pathé
- Release date: 16 January 2013 (France)
- Running time: 104 minutes
- Country: France
- Language: French
- Budget: €7 million ($7.8 million)
- Box office: $11.1 million

Bicycling with Molière (French: Alceste à bicyclette) is a 2013 French comedy-drama film written and directed by Philippe Le Guay. In January 2014, the film received three nominations at the 39th César Awards.

== Cast ==
- Fabrice Luchini as Serge Tanneur
- Lambert Wilson as Gauthier Valence
- Maya Sansa as Francesca
- Camille Japy as Christine
- Ged Marlon as Meynard, the real estate agent
- Stéphan Wojtowicz as the taxi driver
- Annie Mercier as Tamara, the agent
- Christine Murillo as Mme Françon
- Josiane Stoléru as Raphaëlle La Puisaye
- Julie-Anne Roth as Betty
