= Odette Toulemonde =

- Theatrical release poster
- Directed by: Éric-Emmanuel Schmitt
- Written by: Éric-Emmanuel Schmitt
- Produced by: Gaspard De Chavagnac
- Starring: Catherine Frot; Albert Dupontel; Jacques Weber
- Cinematography: Carlo Varini
- Edited by: Philippe Bourgueil
- Music by: Nicola Piovani
- Distributed by: Pathé Distribution
- Release date: 6 November 2006 (Sarlat Film Festival)
- Running time: 100 minutes
- Country: France
- Language: French

Odette Toulemonde is a 2006 French comedy film written and directed by Éric-Emmanuel Schmitt.

== Cast ==
- Catherine Frot - Odette Toulemonde
- Albert Dupontel - Balthazar Balsan
- Jacques Weber - Olaf Pims
- Fabrice Murgia - Rudy
- Nina Drecq - Sue Ellen
- Camille Japy - Nadine
