= Lucienne Hamon =

French actress (1930–2026)

- Born: Lucienne Annie Sonia Goldenberg; 22 August 1930; Montrouge, France
- Died: 23 May 2026 (aged 95); Couilly-Pont-aux-Dames, France
- Occupation: Actress
- Relatives: Léo Hamon (father)

Lucienne Hamon (French: [lysjˈɛn amˈɔ̃]; 22 August 1930 – 23 May 2026) was a French actress.

Hamon was born as Lucienne Annie Sonia Goldenberg, but her father, Léo Hamon, changed the family surname in 1948. A stage and film actress, she also wrote the screenplay for Tante Zita, the 1968 film directed by Robert Enrico.

Hamon died in Couilly-Pont-aux-Dames on 23 May 2026, at the age of 95.

== Filmography ==
=== Film ===
- The Lovers (1958)
- Ho! (1968)
- Birgitt Haas Must Be Killed (1981)

=== Television ===
- Les Cinq Dernières Minutes (1981)
