= Annick Alane =

French actress (1925–2019)

Annick Alane (5 September 1925 – 28 October 2019) was a French film, television, and theatre actress from Carnac.

Alane in 2001

== Filmography ==
- 1957: Les Truands (directed by Carlo Rim)
- 1965: Les Pieds dans le plâtre (directed by Jacques Fabbri and Pierre Lary)
- 1969: Hibernatus (directed by Édouard Molinaro) - Madame Crépin-Jaujard - la mère d'Evelyne
- 1971: Le Petit Matin (directed by Jean-Gabriel Albicocco) - Soeur Marie-Émilienne
- 1971: La Cavale (directed by Michel Mitrani)
- 1974: La Gifle (directed by Claude Pinoteau) - La femme de ménage de Jean
- 1977: Comme sur des roulettes (directed by Nina Companeez) - La femme de l'agence
- 1977: La Nuit de Saint-Germain-des-Prés (directed by Bob Swaim) - Hélène
- 1978: Passe ton bac d'abord (directed by Maurice Pialat) - La mère
- 1981: Pour la peau d'un flic (directed by Alain Delon) - Isabelle Pigot
- 1982: Qu'est-ce qu'on attend pour être heureux! (directed by Coline Serreau) - Lulu
- 1983: L'Homme blessé (directed by Patrice Chéreau) - Henri's mother
- 1983: Garçon! (directed by Claude Sautet) - Jeannette, la femme d'un retraité grincheux
- 1984: Une Américaine à Paris (directed by Rick Rosenthal) - Givenchy Saleswoman
- 1984: La Septième Cible (directed by Claude Pinoteau) - Gabrielle, l'amie de Mme Grimaldi
- 1985: Parking (directed by Jacques Demy) - Lucienne
- 1985: La Baston (directed by Jean-Claude Missiaen) - Yvonne Levasseur
- 1985: Trois hommes et un couffin (directed by Coline Serreau) - La pharmacienne
- 1987: Promis... juré! (directed by Jacques Monnet) - Marguerite Hamon
- 1989: L'Orchestre rouge (directed by Jacques Rouffio) - Juliette
- 1991: La Totale! (directed by Claude Zidi) - Pascaline
- 1992: La Crise (directed by Coline Serreau) - Mamie
- 1993: Germinal (directed by Claude Berri) - Madame Grégoire
- 1995: Les Trois Frères (directed by Didier Bourdon and Bernard Campan) - Geneviève Rougemont
- 1998: Le Monde de Marty (directed by Denis Bardiau) - Suzanne Berrant
- 2001: Mortel transfert (directed by Jean-Jacques Beineix) (role cut from film)
- 2003: 18 ans après (directed by Coline Serreau) - La pharmacienne
- 2004: Vipère au poing (directed by Philippe de Broca) - Mme Rézeau
- 2004: Les Couilles de mon chat (Short, directed by Didier Bénureau)
- 2008: Deux jours à tuer (directed by Jean Becker) - Madame Lemoine
- 2009: La femme invisible (d'après une histoire vraie) (directed by Agathe Teyssier) - Mémé
- 2011: Crimes en sourdine (directed by Joël Chalude) - Mme Garcia II
- 2012: La clinique de l'amour! (directed by Artus de Penguern) - Madame Santiago
- 2012: The Suicide Shop (directed by Patrice Leconte) - La petite dame âgée / La petite dame 2 (voice)

=== Television ===
- 1960: Au fil de l'histoire (Les Cinq Dernières Minutes)
- 1972: Schulmeister, espion de l'empereur - Mme Fouché
- 1981: Pause Café
- 1981: Julien Fontanes, magistrat (directed by François Dupont-Midi) - Zoutie
- 1984: Emmenez-moi au théâtre (Croque Monsieur) - Valérie
- 1988: Pause Café, Pause Tendresse
- 1990: Les Mouettes (TV Movie) - Finette
- 1998: Le comte de Monte-Cristo - Vieille Femme
- 2004: Louis la brocante - Soeur Suzanne
- 2009: Joséphine, ange gardien (TV Series, 1 Episode: "Police blues") - Madame Heuchel

== Theatre ==
- 1951: Une nuit à Megève, Théâtre Michel
- 1955: Le Quai Conti, Théâtre Gramont
- 1962: The Merry Wives of Windsor, Théâtre de l'Ambigu-Comique
- 1963: La Grande Oreille, Théâtre de Paris
- 1963: Les Femmes savantes, Théâtre de l'Ambigu-Comique
- 1964: L'Aquarium, Théâtre de Paris
- 1965: La Grande Oreille, Théâtre de Paris
- 1965: L'Envers d'une conspiration, Théâtre de Paris
- 1965: Je veux voir Mioussov, Théâtre des Nouveautés
- 1968: Les Hussards, Théâtre de Paris
- 1972: Huit Femmes, Théâtre de la Madeleine
- 1974: Et à la fin était le bang, Théâtre de l'Atelier
- 1975: Les Secrets de la Comédie humaine, Théâtre du Palais-Royal
- 1975: L'Autre Valse, Théâtre des Variétés
- 1977: Féfé de Broadway, Théâtre des Variétés
- 1979: Je veux voir Mioussov, Théâtre du Palais-Royal
- 1981: Pauvre France, Théâtre du Palais-Royal
- 1988: Douce Nuit, National Theatre of Strasbourg
- 1991: Cœur ardent, National Theatre of Brittany
- 1992: Les Dimanches de Monsieur Riley, Théâtre de l'Œuvre
- 1994: La Folle de Chaillot, Maison de la Culture de Loire-Atlantique in Nantes
- 1996: Lapin lapin, Théâtre de la Porte Saint-Martin
- 1998: Il est important d'être fidèle, Théâtre des Champs-Élysées
- 1998: Délicate Balance, Théâtre Antoine
- 2000: La Chatte sur un toit brûlant, Théâtre de la Renaissance
- 2001: La Jalousie, Théâtre Edouard VII
- 2002: Etat critique, Théâtre Fontaine
- 2004: Grosse Chaleur, Théâtre de la Renaissance
- 2006: Le Jardin, Théâtre des Mathurins
- 2008: La Tectonique des sentiments, Théâtre Marigny

== Awards and nominations ==
- 1993: Nomination – Molière Award for Best Supporting Actress for Les Dimanches de Monsieur Riley
- 1994: Molière Award for Best Supporting Actress for Tailleur pour dames
- 2001: Molière Award for Best Supporting Actress for La Chatte sur un toit brûlant
- 2003: Nomination – Molière Award for Best Supporting Actress for État critique
