= Catherine Rich (actress) =

French actress (1932–2021)

- Born: 10 June 1932; 17th arrondissement of Paris, France
- Died: 18 January 2021 (aged 88); 18th arrondissement of Paris, France
- Spouse: Claude Rich
- Children: Delphine Rich

Catherine Rich (French pronunciation: [katʁin ʁiʃ]; née Renaudin; 10 June 1932 – 18 January 2021) was a French actress.

== Life ==
Rich was born in the 17th arrondissement of Paris in 1932. Her father Renaudin and her maternal grandfather were politicians.

She married Claude Rich who was also an actor.

The 1962 cast of The Burning Court included Rich who was making her debut on the screen.

In 1972, she took a role in the TV miniseries Les Rois maudits. In 1991, she was nominated for a Molière Award for her role in the play La Dame de chez Maxim.

Rich died in the 18th arrondissement of Paris in January 2021.

== Private life ==
She and her husband, Claude Rich, had two daughters and an adopted son. Her husband died in 2017 from cancer.
