= Thierry Jobin =

Thierry Jobin (born 1969), is a Swiss film critic, journalist and the artistic director of the Fribourg International Film Festival (FIFF).

== Biography ==
Thierry Jobin was 15 years old when he had his first opportunity to share his passion through journalism. He studied linguistics at the University of Fribourg from which he graduated in 1992. He wrote in numerous newspapers and medias such as Le Temps in Geneva (1998–2011). In 2012, he became artistic director of the Fribourg International Film Festival (FIFF). Thierry Jobin is expert for the Swiss fund Visions Sud Est and for Final Cut in Venice, the postproduction fund for Africa launched in 2013 by Venezia, Amiens and Fribourg.
