= Céline Montaland =

French actress, dancer and singer

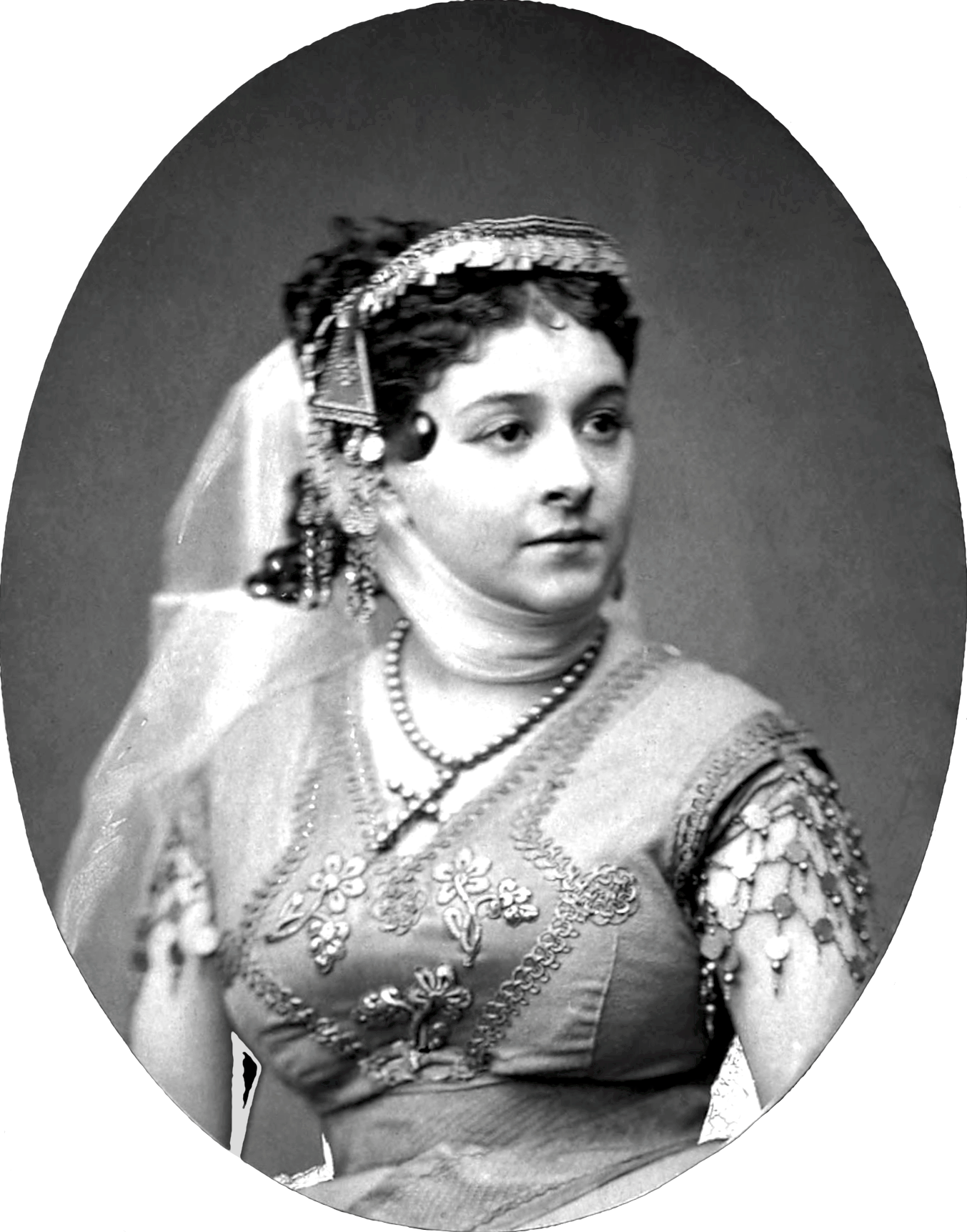
Céline Montaland

Céline Montaland (10 August 1843 – 8 January 1891) was a French actress, dancer and singer.

== Biography ==
Céline Montaland was born on 10 August 1843 in Ghent, Belgium. Her parents, Pierre Montaland and Mathilde Chevalier, were actors. She was trained by her father, who was a former actor at Théâtre du Vaudeville. She made her debut at the age of six at Comédie-Française in the role of Camille in Gabrielle (1849) of Émile Augier. She was the “youngest actress ever to perform at this theater.” She performed a number of children roles, which were specially created for her.

In 1860 she returned to Paris after a worldwide musical tour by her theatrical troupe which got a wide public attention. She continued to perform in different popular theaters including Théâtre du Palais-Royal, Odéon-Théâtre de l'Europe and Comédie-Française. At the end of her distinguished theatrical career, she became a Sociétaire at the Comédie-Française in 1888.

She died in Paris, France on 8 January 1891.
