= François Bon =

French writer and translator

- Born: 22 May 1953 (age 73); Luçon, France
- Occupations: novelist, playwright, translator
- Writing career
- Genres: novel, theatre, traduction
- Website: www.tierslivre.net

François Bon (born 22 May 1953 in Luçon) is a French writer and translator.

== Work ==
François Bon published his first novel in 1982, Sortie d'usine. He then earned a creative residency at the Villa Médicis in 1984, and has since worked in literature, as a writer, translator, performer or publisher. François Bon has written essays, novels, radio programs, poetry as well as theatre or children's literature.

In 2010, he began a series of translations of novels and essays by the American author H.P Lovecraft, for which he created a website, The Lovecraft Monument.

He also works with underprivileged young people in writing workshops. Since 2013, he teaches creative writing at the Ecole Nationale Supérieure d'Arts of Cergy-Pontoise (France).

== Contribution to web literature ==
In 1997, Bon created one of the first French websites entirely about literature : remue.net, that evolved into tierslivre.net and became his primary creative platform. His interest in literary creation on and for the Internet led him to work on a project about digital photography, tumulte.net, a website that turned into a book, Tumulte, published in 2006.

He has since participated in symposiums and panels, where he has discussed the relationship between literature and technology. He launched an ebook publishing company, Publie.net and has released an essay about the changing nature of the book in the Information Age, Après le livre (2011).

In 2016, Bon created his own publishing house, Tiers Livre Editeurs, which complements his blog's output.

== Distinctions ==
- 1984-1985 : resident at the Villa Médicis.
- 1987-1988 : laureate of the Deutscher Akademischer Austauschdienst (Berliner Künstlerprogramm).
- 1991 : laureate of the Bosch Fondation (Stuttgart).
- 1992 : awarded the Prix Paul Vaillant-Couturier for L'Enterrement.
- 1992 : awarded the Prix du livre en Poitou-Charentes for L’Enterrement.
- 1993 : awarded the Prix Télérama for Dans la ville invisible.
- 2000 : awarded the Prix France Culture / revue Urbanisme "La ville à lire" for Paysage fer.
- 2002 : awarded the Prix Louis-Guilloux for Mécanique.
- 2002 : awarded the Prix d'automne de la Société des gens de Lettre for Rolling Stones.
- 2004 : awarded the Prix Wepler for Daewoo.
- 2015 : Mission Stendhal (Lovecraft archives in Providence).

== Bibliography ==
=== Romans et récits ===
- Sortie d'usine, Paris, Minuit, 1982
- Limite, Paris, Minuit, 1985
- Le Crime de Buzon, Paris, Minuit, 1986
- Décor ciment, Paris, Minuit, 1988
- Calvaire des chiens, Paris, Minuit, 1990
- L'Enterrement, Lagrasse, Verdier, 1991
- Temps machine, Lagrasse, Verdier, 1992
- Un fait divers, Paris, Minuit, 1994
- C'était toute une vie, Lagrasse, Verdier, 1995
- Parking, Paris, Minuit, 1996
- Voleurs de feu - Les vies singulières des poètes, illustrated by François Place, Paris, Hatier, 1996
- Prison, Lagrasse, Verdier, 1997
- Impatience, Paris, Minuit, 1998
- Tous les mots sont adultes, method for writing workshops, Paris, Fayard, 2000
- Paysage fer, Lagrasse, Verdier, 2000
- 15021, photos of Jérôme Schlomoff, Coaraze, L'Amourier éditions, 2000
- Mécanique, Lagrasse, Verdier, 2001
- Daewoo, Paris, Fayard, 2004
- Tumulte, Paris, Fayard, 2006
- L'Incendie du Hilton, Paris, Albin Michel, 2009

=== Children's and youth's literature ===
- Dans la ville invisible, Paris, Gallimard Jeunesse, 1993
- 30, rue de la Poste, Paris, Seuil Jeunesse, 1996
- Autoroute, Paris, Seuil Jeunesse, 1998

=== Essays and biographies ===
- La Folie Rabelais, Paris, Minuit, 1990
- François Place, illustrateur, Paris, Casterman, 1994
- Dehors est la ville, essay about Edward Hopper, Paris, Flohic, 1998
- Pour Koltès, Besançon, Solitaires Intempestifs, 2000
- Rolling Stones, une biographie, Paris, Fayard, 2002
- Bob Dylan, une biographie, Paris, Albin Michel, 2007
- Rock'n roll, un portrait de Led Zeppelin, Paris, Albin Michel, 2008
- Billancourt, with photos from Antoine Stéphani, Paris, Cercle d'art, 2004
- Petit Palais, with photos from Antoine Stéphani, Paris, Cercle d'art, 2005
- Après le livre, Paris, Seuil, 2011
- Autobiographie des objets, Paris, Seuil, 2012
- Proust est une fiction, Paris, Seuil, 2013
- Fragments du dedans, Paris, Grasset, 2014

=== Theatre plays ===
- Quatre avec le mort, Paris, Verdier, 2002
- Quoi faire de son chien mort, Besançon, Solitaires intempestifs, 2004
- Dialogue avec ta mort, Tiers Livre éditeur, 2016
