= Axel Ganz =

German journalist (1937–2026)

- Born: 25 July 1937; Auggen, Gau Baden, Germany
- Died: 22 July 2026 (aged 88)
- Occupation: Journalist

Axel Ganz (25 July 1937 – 22 July 2026) was a German journalist.

== Life and career ==
Born in Auggen on 25 July 1937, Ganz began his career with Badische Zeitung before moving to Paris to work as a correspondent for weekly magazine Bunte. In 1979, he attempted to purchase the women's magazine Modes & Travaux but was unsuccessful. He was instead the founder of the French section of Gruner + Jahr, where he established several magazines, including TV Grandes Chaînes. In October 2006, he founded the magazine Jasmin.

Ganz died on 22 July 2026, at the age of 88.
