= Josiane Stoléru =

French actress

Josiane Stoléru is a French film, television and theatre actress.

Stoléru was born and raised in Lyon, France. Her cousin was the late French politician Lionel Stoléru.

She is married to fellow actor Patrick Chesnais, and their daughter Émilie Chesnais is also an actress.

== Selected filmography ==
- Cyrano de Bergerac (1990), as the Duenna
- Something Fishy (1994)
- A Piece of Sky (2002), as Mme. Picri
- Wild Side (2004), as the mother
- Bicycling with Molière (2013), as Raphaelle La Puisaye
- The Mystery of Henri Pick (2019), as Madeleine Pick
