= Philippe Le Guay =

French screenwriter, film director and actor

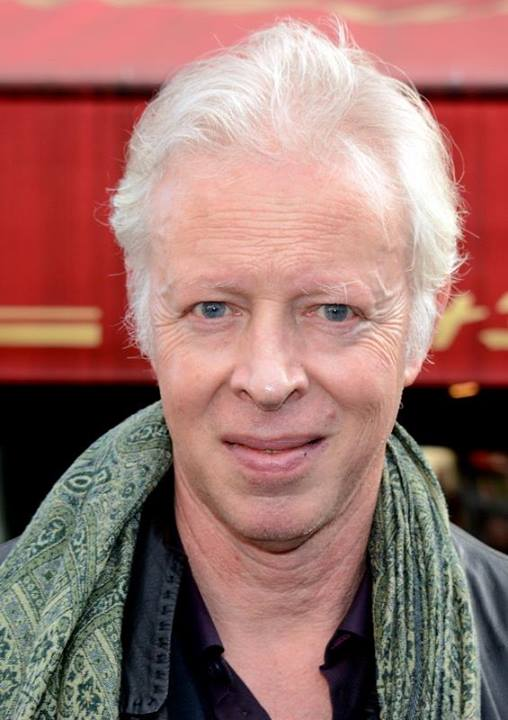
- Philippe Le Guay in 2014
- Born: 22 October 1956 (age 69); Paris, France
- Occupations: Screenwriter, film director, actor
- Years active: 1983–present
- Relatives: Dominique de Villepin (brother-in-law); Marie de Villepin (niece)

Philippe Le Guay (born 22 October 1956) is a French screenwriter, film director and occasional actor. He studied film at the IDHEC and began his career as a screenwriter before directing his first feature film Les Deux Fragonard in 1989. He is known for his work on The Women on the 6th Floor (2010), which was well received at the French box office, and the César Award-nominated Bicycling with Molière (2013).

== Filmography ==
=== As director/screenwriter ===
Year	Title	Credited as		Notes
Year	Title	Director	Screenwriter	Notes
1983	Il ne faut jurer de rien		Yes	Short film
1984	Le Clou	Yes	Yes	Short film Audience Award (Clermont-Ferrand International Short Film Festival)
1985	Grosse		Yes	Short film
1986	15 août		Yes	Short film
1987	Cayenne Palace		Yes	
1989	Les Deux Fragonard	Yes	Yes	
1989	Sandra		Yes	Also as actor
1990	Every Other Weekend		Yes	
1990	Overseas		Yes	Bayard d'Or for Best Screenplay
1992	Lapse of Memory		Yes	
1992	Urgence d'aimer	Yes	Yes	Telefilm
1993	Ascension Express		Yes	Telefilm
1993	Rhésus Roméo	Yes		Telefilm
1995	L'Année Juliette	Yes	Yes	
1996	Tout ce qui brille		Yes	Telefilm
1997	After Sex		Yes	
2001	Nightshift	Yes	Yes	
2003	The Cost of Living	Yes	Yes	
2006	Du jour au lendemain	Yes	Yes	
2010	The Women on the 6th Floor	Yes	Yes	
2011	Vian Was His Name	Yes		Telefilm
2011	My Little Princess		Yes	
2013	Bicycling with Molière	Yes	Yes	Audience Award for Best in World Cinema (Sarasota Film Festival); Nominated—César Award for Best Original Screenplay
2015	Belles Familles		Yes	
2015	Floride	Yes	Yes	
2018	Naked Normandy	Yes	Yes	
2020	The Rose Maker (La fine fleur)		Yes	
2021	The Man in the Basement	Yes	Yes	

=== As actor ===
Year	Title	Role
1989	Sandra	A diplomat
1991	Août	The bar owner
1991	Textiles	The regular patron
2014	Not My Type	The moderator
