= Coline Serreau =

French actress, film director and writer (born 1947)

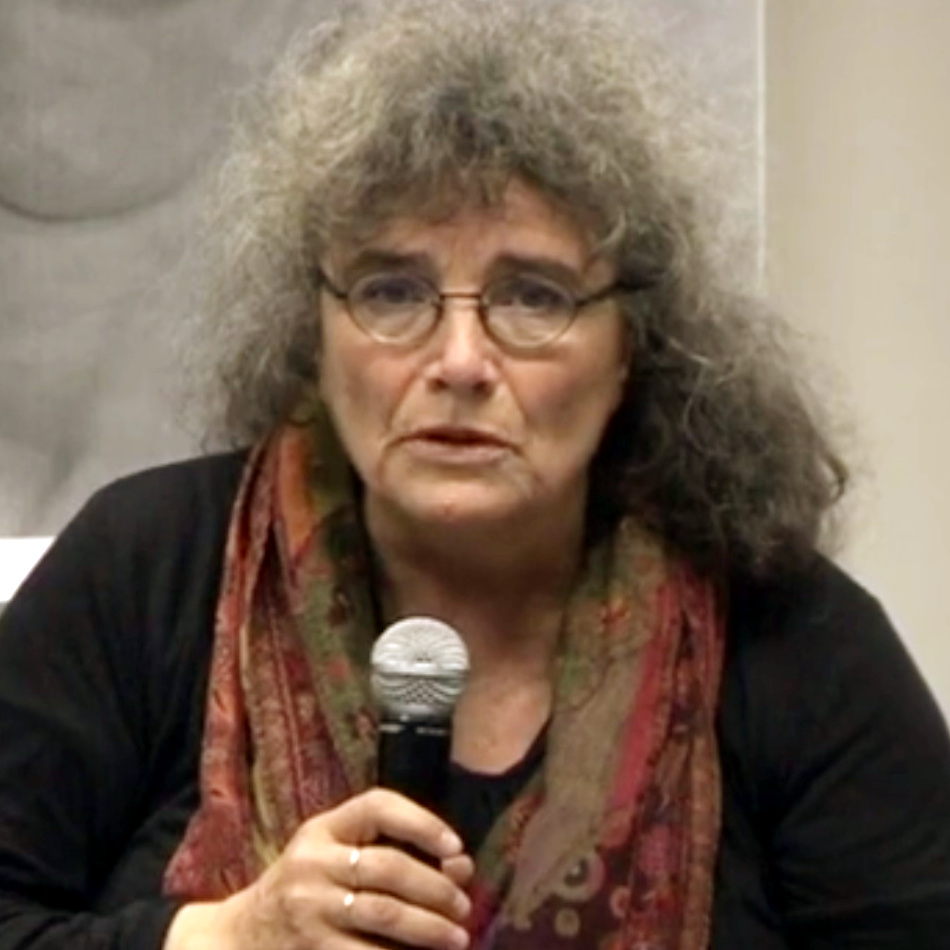
- Coline Serreau speaks with Mouvement Colibris in 2012
- Born: 29 October 1947 (age 79); Paris, France
- Occupations: Actress, film director and writer

Coline Serreau (born 29 October 1947) is a French actress, film director and writer.

== Early life and education ==
She was born in Paris, the daughter of theatre director Jean-Marie Serreau and actress Geneviève Serreau. In Paris, Serreau studied literature, music and theatre and is a trained organist and trapeze artist.

Her stage work began at the Comédie Française and she has written many plays. Her film debut in 1977 was Pourquoi pas!, a love triangle story which was a success around Europe.

Her 1985 comedy Trois hommes et un couffin (remade in the US as Three Men and a Baby was the most commercially successful film of the 1980s in French.

== Career ==
In 1970, she made her debut as an actress at the Théâtre du Vieux-Colombier.

Serreau wrote her first screenplay in 1973.

Her first film, the documentary film Mais qu'est-ce qu'elles veulent? (1978), literally: But What Is It That They Want?, was a compilation of interviews with women from various backgrounds. The frankness of the statements shocked parts of the public.

Her biggest commercial success was the comedy film Three Men and a Cradle (Trois hommes et un couffin; 1985), for which she received three César Awards in 1986. It was also nominated for the Academy Award for Best Foreign Language Film.

In 1986, her first drama for the stage Lapin Lapin (Rabbit Rabbit), directed by Benno Besson, had its world premiere. She collaborated with Besson for several years and he also staged Le théâtre de verdure (1987) and Quisaitout et Grobêta (1993).

== Filmography ==
Year	Title	Role	Notes
1974	On s'est trompé d'histoire d'amour	Screenplay and role of Anne	
1975	7 morts sur ordonnance	Role of Mrs. Mauvagne	
1977	Why Not! (Pourquoi pas)	Writer, Director	
1978	Mais qu'est ce qu'elles veulent?	Writer, Director	
1979	Grand-mère de l'Islam	Writer, Director	Short documentary
1982	Qu'est-ce qu'on attend pour être heureux!	Writer, Director	
1985	Three Men and a Cradle (Trois hommes et un couffin)	Writer, Director	
1989	Mama, There's a Man in Your Bed (Romuald et Juliette)	Writer, Director	
1992	La Crise	Writer, Director	
1996	La Belle Verte	Writer, Director, role of Mila	
2001	Chaos	Writer, Director	
2003	18 Years Later (18 ans après)	Writer, Director	
2005	Saint-Jacques… La Mecque	Writer, Director	
2010	Solutions locales pour un désordre global	Writer, Director	
2014	Tout est permis	Writer, Director	
2014	Couleur locale	Co-writer and co-director with Samuel Tasinaje	TV film
2015	Pierre Brossolette ou les passagers de la lune	Director	TV film

== Awards and nominations ==
Year	Award	Category	Work	Result	Notes
1978	Chicago International Film Festival	Gold Hugo (Best Feature)	Pourquoi pas!	Nominated	
1982	Venice Film Festival	Golden Lion	Qu'est-ce qu'on attend pour être heureux!	Nominated	
1985	National Academy of Cinema, France	Academy Award	3 hommes et un couffin	Won	
1986	Academy Awards	Academy Award for Best International Feature Film	3 hommes et un couffin		
1986	César Awards, France	Best Film (Meilleur film)	3 hommes et un couffin	Won	
1986	César Awards, France	Best Original Screenplay or Adaptation (Meilleur scénario original ou adaptation)	3 hommes et un couffin	Won	
1986	César Awards, France	Best Director (Meilleur réalisateur)	3 hommes et un couffin	Nominated	
1991	BAFTA Awards	Best Film Not in the English Language	Romuald et Juliette	Nominated	
1993	César Awards, France	Best Film (Meilleur film)	La crise	Nominated	
1993	César Awards, France	Best Original Screenplay or Adaptation (Meilleur scénario original ou adaptation)	La crise	Won	
2002	Norwegian International Film Festival	Audience Award	Chaos	Won	
2002	Norwegian International Film Festival	Norwegian Film Critics Award	Chaos	Won	
2002	César Awards, France	Best Film (Meilleur film)	Chaos	Nominated	
2002	César Awards, France	Best Original Screenplay or Adaptation (Meilleur scénario original ou adaptation)	Chaos	Nominated	
2010	São Paulo International Film Festival	Audience Award	Solutions locales pour un désordre global	Won	

== See also ==
- List of female film and television directors
- List of LGBT-related films directed by women
