= Les Femmes Savantes =

Comedy by Molière in five acts

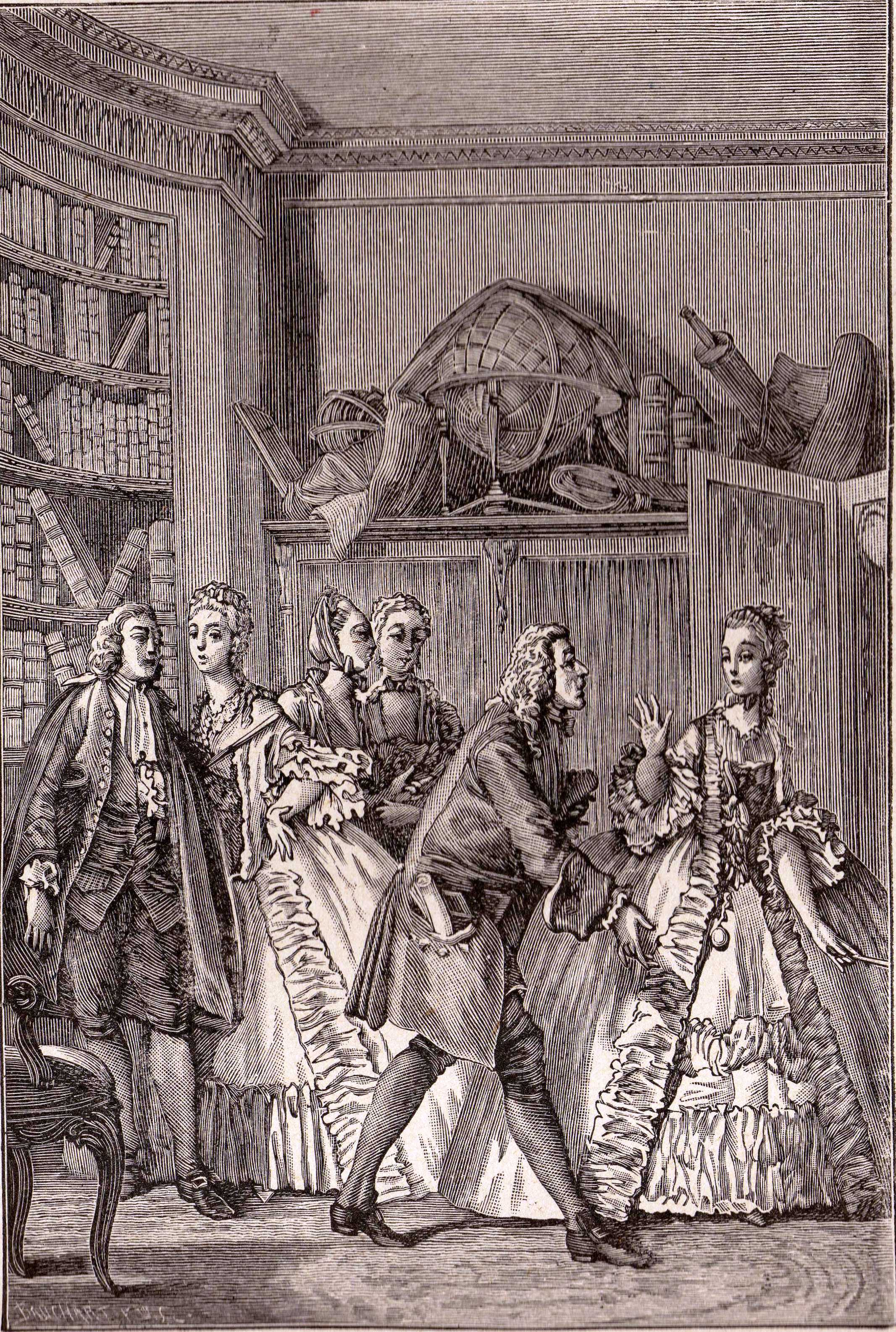
Les Femmes savantes (engraving by Moreau le jeune)

Les Femmes savantes (French pronunciation: [le fam savɑ̃t], The Learned Ladies) is a comedy by Molière in five acts, written in verse. A satire on academic pretension, female education, and préciosité (French for preciosity), it was one of his most popular comedies and the last of his great plays in verse. It premiered at the Théâtre du Palais-Royal on 11 March 1672. The character Trissotin, the main antagonist, is a caricature of Charles Cotin, an adversary of Nicolas Boileau and Molière, who both saw him as the perfect example of a pedantic scholar and mediocre scribbler.

The premise is thus: two young people, Henriette and Clitandre, are in love, but in order to marry, they must overcome an obstacle: the attitude of Henriette's family. Her sensible father and uncle are in favour of the marriage; but unfortunately her father is under the thumb of his wife, Philaminte. And Philaminte, supported by Henriette's aunt and sister, wishes her to marry Trissotin, a "scholar" and mediocre poet with lofty aspirations, who has these three women completely in his thrall. For these three ladies are "learned"; their obsession in life is learning and culture of the most pretentious kind, and Trissotin is their special protégé and the fixture of their literary salon.

== Synopsis ==
=== Act I ===
In Scene 1, Henriette tells her sister Armande of her intention to marry Clitandre. Armande, after scolding Henriette for rejecting the pursuit of learning for domesticity, says that she believes that Clitandre, once her own suitor, is still in love with her, despite the fact she refused him because of her devotion to scholarship. In Scene 2, Clitandre arrives and makes it clear that Armande is deluding herself; her coldness killed his love for her, and he is now truly in love with Henriette. In Scene 3, the embittered Armande leaves and Henriette advises Clitandre to gain the consent of her mother (Philaminte), for it is she who dominates the family. Clitandre knows he must flatter Philaminte to gain her consent, but finds her "studies" foolish and cannot hide this. He meets Henriette's aunt Belise in Scene 4 and attempts to speak with her about his wish to marry Henriette, but Belise imagines that this is merely a subtle way of declaring that he loves her (Belise) and ignores what he is actually trying to say.

=== Act II ===
Henriette's uncle Ariste addresses Clitandre in Scene 1 and assures him of his support. In Scene 2 Ariste begins to talk with Chrysale, Henriette's father; in Scene 3 he comes to the point and presents Clitandre's request for Chrysale's consent to marry Henriette. But Belise here interrupts, saying that he is wrong and in fact Clitandre loves her; Ariste responds by mocking her and pointing out she is always inventing suitors for herself. Belise leaves; in Scene 4, Chrysale consents to the marriage; when Ariste advises that he talk to his wife about it, Chrysale replies there is nothing to discuss and that he makes the decisions in this household. But the hollowness of this claim is revealed in Scene 5: Martine, the family servant, runs in, announcing she is being sent away by Philaminte. Philaminte and Belise enter in Scene 6 and reveal the motive for their anger at Martine: she has committed a terrible crime - bad grammar, which is worse, they say, than theft. In Scene 7, Chrysale reproaches his wife for neglecting common sense and ordinary household duties in her obsession with her studies and her patronage of Trissotin. But when Chrysale gingerly brings up the topic of Henriette's marriage in Scene 8, Philaminte interrupts before he can tell her the full story, and announces that she thinks it good that Henriette should marry, and that she has found the perfect husband for her: Trissotin. The weak Chrysale does not know how to reply; the ladies leave. When Ariste returns in Scene 9, Chrysale confesses his weakness to him, but resolves that he will no longer be ruled by his wife.

=== Act III ===
Scene 1 opens at the ladies' literary salon, where Trissotin is amusing and instructing them. Henriette wanders in during Scene 2, and Philaminte forces her to stay and listen to Trissotin's reading of his own poems. The two poems Trissotin reads are actual poems by Charles Cotin, and the extravagant praises Philaminte, Belise and Armande lavish on them only serve to showcase how ridiculous they are. Scene 3 sees the arrival of another scholar, Vadius; the ladies swoon over him when they learn he knows classical Greek, and line up to kiss him, "pour l'amour du grec" ("for the love of Greek"). Trissotin and Vadius then pay each other extravagant compliments; however, they then quarrel violently when Vadius criticises an anonymous sonnet which was in fact by Trissotin. Philaminte explains in Scene 4 why she has forced Henriette to stay; she announces her intention that Henriette marry Trissotin. Armande congratulates Henriette in Scene 5, and reminds her of her duty to obey their mother. Then Chrysale arrives and orders that Henriette marry Clitandre. Henriette is delighted; the learned ladies, especially Armande, are not.

=== Act IV ===
In Scene 1, Armande is conducting a tirade against Clitandre. Clitandre appears in Scene 2 and asks why she hates him so. She replies that he betrayed her by falling in love with Henriette instead of continuing to love her (Armande) platonically. Philaminte concludes the conversation by repeating her intention that Henriette marry Trissotin. Trissotin appears in Scene 3 and has a verbal stoush with Clitandre concerning the value of scholarship. A letter arrives in Scene 4 from the bitter Vadius which informs Philaminte that Trissotin is only after her money. But she dismisses this and summons a notary to conduct the wedding immediately. Chrysale, informed of this in Scene 5, decides to thwart her plans and goes to look for his own notary.

=== Act V ===
Henriette meets Trissotin in private in Scene 1 and begs him not to marry her, but he claims he is deeply in love with her. In Scene 2, Chrysale arrives accompanied by Martine, reaffirms that he is master of the household and demands to be obeyed. Philaminte and the learned ladies then arrive with a notary in Scene 3; when the notary asks who the bridegroom is, Philaminte and Chrysale each nominate a different man, and Martine defends Chrysale's choice. Ariste runs in Scene 4 with a shocking announcement; a decision has just been handed down in a long-running lawsuit that means the family is now ruined financially. Upon learning this, Trissotin tries to get out of the marriage, then confesses he was only interested in Henriette for her money, to Philaminte's fury. Ariste reveals that his story was untrue, a ruse to reveal Trissotin's true colours, and the play ends with the marriage of Clitandre and Henriette.
