= Jacques Spiesser =

French actor

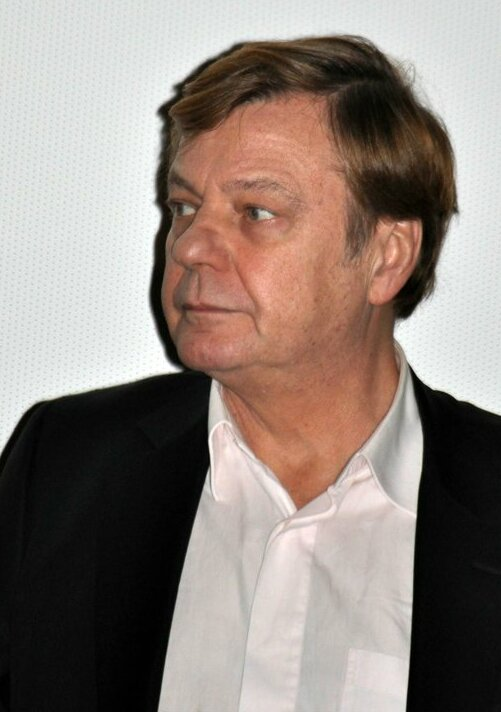
- Spiesser in 2010
- Born: 7 June 1947 (age 79); Angers, France
- Occupation: Actor

Jacques Spiesser (born 7 June 1947) is a French actor. He stars as detective Simon Magellan in the television series Commissaire Magellan. which ran for six seasons in France.

== Biography ==
After having taken courses at the Conservatoire, he made his film debut in 1972 in Nina Companeez's Faustine et le bel été with Muriel Catala.

He is best known to English-speaking audiences for playing the role of Gilles in Priceless.

== Filmography ==
=== Cinema ===
- 1972: Faustine et le bel été, directed by Nina Companeez
- 1973: R.A.S., directed by Yves Boisset
- 1974: The Man Who Sleeps, directed by Bernard Queysanne after Georges Perec
- 1974: The Irony of Chance, directed by Édouard Molinaro
- 1974: Stavisky, directed by Alain Resnais
- 1974: La Gifle, directed by Claude Pinoteau
- 1974: Section spéciale, directed by Costa-Gavras
- 1975: Serious as Pleasure, directed by Robert Benayoun
- 1975: Lumière, directed by Jeanne Moreau
- 1975: Le Petit Marcel, directed by Jacques Fansten
- 1976: Je suis Pierre Rivière, directed by Christine Lipinska
- 1976: La Victoire en chantant, directed by Jean-Jacques Annaud
- 1977: Le juge fayard, dit Le Shériff, directed by Yves Boisset
- 1982: La Truite, directed by Joseph Losey
- 1985: Folie suisse, directed by Christine Lipinska
- 1986: On a volé Charlie Spencer, directed by Francis Huster
- 1988: Baxter, directed by Jérôme Boivin with Lise Delamare
- 1989: Thick Skinned, directed by Patricia Mazuy
- 1989: L'Homme imaginé, directed by Patricia Bardon
- 1992: Tout ça... pour ça !, directed by Claude Lelouch with Fabrice Luchini
- 1996: Madame Jacques sur la Croisette, directed by Emmanuel Finkiel with Shulamit Adar
- 1998: Rembrandt, directed by Charles Matton with Klaus Maria Brandauer
- 1999: La Vie moderne, directed by Laurence Ferreira Barbosa with Isabelle Huppert
- 2000: De l'histoire ancienne, directed by Orso Miret with Yann Goven
- 2000: Après la réconciliation, directed by Anne-Marie Miéville with Anne-Marie Miéville and Jean-Luc Godard
- 2001: C'est la vie, directed by Jean-Pierre Améris with Jacques Dutronc
- 2002: Elle est des nôtres, directed by Siegrid Alnoy with Sasha Andres
- 2003: Je suis un assassin, directed by Thomas Vincent with François Cluzet
- 2003: San-Antonio, directed by Frédéric Auburtin with Gérard Lanvin
- 2005: Itinéraires, directed by Christophe Otzenberger
- 2006: Le Passager de l'été, directed by Florence Moncorgé-Gabin with Catherine Frot and Laura Smet
- 2006: A City Is Beautiful at Night, directed by Richard Bohringer with Richard Bohringer
- 2006: Hors de prix, directed by Pierre Salvadori with Audrey Tautou et Gad Elmaleh
- 2006: My Best Friend, directed by Patrice Leconte with Daniel Auteuil and Dany Boon
- 2007: Écoute le temps (Fissures), directed by Alantė Kavaitė with Emilie, directed byquenne and Ludmila Mikaël
- 2007: Nos retrouvailles, directed by David Oelhoffen with Jacques Gamblin and Nicolas Giraud
- 2009: A Man and His Dog, directed by Francis Huster
- 2009: Coco, directed by Gad Elmaleh
- 2014: Le Dernier Diamant, directed by Éric Barbier with Bérénice Bejo and Yvan Attal

=== Television ===
- 1974: Le Pain noir, directed by Serge Moati (feuilleton télévisé)
- 1983: Diane Lanster, directed by Bernard Queysanne
- 1995: Maigret et l'affaire Saint-Fiacre, directed by Denys de La Patellière : le comte de Saint-Fiacre
- 1998: Victor Schoelcher, l'abolition, directed by Paul Vecchiali
- 1999: Dessine-moi un jouet : Raoul Monge
- 2004: Nature contre nature : M. Lorieux
- 2005: Zodiaque : Maître Etienne Lefort
- 2005: La Belle et le sauvage : Le commissaire Perrault
- 2005: Les Rois maudits : Charles, Count of Valois
- 2006: Chasse à l'homme avec Richard Berry
- 2007: Le Vrai coupable, directed by Francis Huster
- 2007: Le Lien, directed by Denis Malleval
- 2007: Sous les vents de Neptune, directed by Josée Dayan: Adrien Danglard
- 2009: L'Homme aux cercles bleus, directed by Josée Dayan
- 2009: Mourir d'aimer, directed by Josée Dayan
- 2009: Jusqu'à l'enfer, directed by Denis Malleval
- 2009–2016: Commissaire Magellan: Commissaire Simon Magellan
- 2017: Capitaine Marleau, directed by Josée Dayan : Thibault Le Preux (1 Episode)

== Theatre ==
Comedian

- 1985: Le Cid, directed by Corneille, mise en scène Francis Huster, Théâtre Renaud-Barrault
- 1987: Dom Juan, directed by Molière, mise en scène Francis Huster, Théâtre Renaud-Barrault
- 1992: Suite royale d’après Crébillon fils et Denis Diderot, mise en scène Francis Huster, Théâtre Marigny
- 1993: Le Cid, directed by Corneille, mise en scène Francis Huster
- 1998: Flip !, directed by Tom Rooney, mise en scène Roger Mirmont, Théâtre Fontaine

Metteur en scène

- 1986: Diderot et l'abbé Barthélémy after Denis Diderot, Théâtre Renaud-Barrault
