= Le Grand Charles =

- Written by: Sonia Moyersoen; Bernard Stora
- Directed by: Bernard Stora
- Starring: Bernard Farcy
- Narrated by: Bernard Stora
- Theme music composer: Vincent Stora
- Country of origin: France
- Original language: French

Production
- Producers: Jean-Pierre Guérin; Véronique Marchat; Sarim Fassi
- Cinematography: Gérard de Battista
- Editor: Jacques Comets
- Running time: 210 minutes
- Production companies: GMT Productions; France 2 Arte

Original release
- Network: France 2
- Release: 27 March – 28 March 2006

Le Grand Charles is a 2006 French television miniseries on the life of Charles de Gaulle from 1939 to 1959, written and directed by Bernard Stora.

== Cast ==
- Bernard Farcy as Charles de Gaulle
- Danièle Lebrun as Yvonne de Gaulle
- David Ryall as Winston Churchill
- Pascal Elso as Gaston Palewski
- Hubert Saint-Macary as Michel Debré
- Denis Podalydès as Claude Mauriac
- Bernard Alane as Paul Ramadier
- Nicolas Vaude as Paul Baudoin
- Bernard Bloch as Jacques Foccart
- Patrick Chesnais as Henri Giraud
- Julien Boisselier as Jacques Chaban-Delmas
- Thierry Hancisse as Olivier Guichard
- Jacques Spiesser as Pierre Pflimlin
- Robert Hardy as Franklin D. Roosevelt
- Sam Spiegel as Gilbert Renault
- Jean Dell as Pierre Billotte
- Grégoire Oestermann as André Malraux
- Scali Delpeyrat as Jacques Baumel
- Pierre-François Dumeniaud as Jacques Soustelle
- Gérard Lartigau as Paul Reynaud
- Jean-Michel Molé as Vincent Auriol
- Gilles David as André Philip
- Stéphane Boucher as Maurice Thorez
- Olivier Granier as Jean Monnet
- Jean-Claude Durand as Raoul Salan
- Denis Bénoliel as René Pleven
- Gérard Chaillou as Charles Corbin
- Célia Desbrus as Anne de Gaulle
- Paul de Launoy as Philippe de Gaulle
- Réginald Huguenin as Jules Moch
- Daniel Kenigsberg as Alphonse Juin
- Patrice Bornand as Michel Poniatowski
- Patrick Zard as Alain de Boissieu
- Paul Aham as Christian Fouchet
- Grégori Derangère as Claude Guy
- Jean-Yves Berteloot as Léon Delbecque
- Jay Benedict as Wilbur
- Hugh Fraser as McMillan
- Dominic Gould as Roosevelt interpreter
- Nicolas Briançon as Paul de Villelume
- Chantal Banlier as Augustine
- Marc Berman as Margerie
- Rémy Carpentier as Flohic
- Sébastien Cotterot as Courcel
- Jean-Yves Chatelais as Delvaux
- Marie Mergey as Mademoiselle Potel
- Olivier Claverie as Gaston de Bonneval
- Jean-Pierre Durand as Linarès
- Vladislav Galard as Guy Monnerot
- Lise Lamétrie as Philomène Zieger
- Pierre Stévenin as Ernest Buffard

== Accolades ==
Year	Award	Category	Recipient	Result
2006	Banff World Media Festival	Best Mini-Series	Jean-Pierre Guérin & Bernard Stora	Nominated
2006	Biarritz International Festival of Audiovisual Programming	TV series and Serials	Bernard Stora	Won
2006	Biarritz International Festival of Audiovisual Programming	TV series and Serials: Actor	Bernard Farcy	Won
2006	International Emmy Awards	Best Actor	Bernard Farcy	Nominated
2006	Luchon International Film Festival	Grand Prize History	Bernard Stora	Won
