= Sam Spiegel (disambiguation) =

Sam Spiegel (1901–1985) was an American film producer.

Sam Spiegel may also refer to:

- Sam Spiegel (actor) (born 1963), French actor
- Sam Spiegel (musician), American musician and DJ
