= Jean Auriac =

French physician and member of the Resistance (1906–1941)

- Born: May 9, 1906; La Roche-sur-Yon
- Died: July 19, 1941; Bordeaux
- Cause of death: Mort pour la France (Died for France), suicide by ingesting mercury cyanide after his arrestation to not betray the members of his Resistance network
- Citizenship: French
- Occupation: professor of medical physics
- Known for: member of the French Resistance during World War II, Confrérie Notre-Dame network
- Relatives: Oscar Auriac (father), Pierre Auriac (brother)

Academic background
- Education: University of Bordeaux

Academic work
- Discipline: Medical physics
- Sub-discipline: radiology and radiotherapy of cancer
- Institutions: University of Bordeaux and Institut Bergonié

Jean Auriac, who was born on 9 May 1906 in La Roche-sur-Yon (Vendée) and died on 19 July 1941 in Bordeaux (Gironde), was a French medical doctor and member of the Resistance who "Died for France" (Mort pour la France). A professor of medical physics at the Faculty of Medicine in Bordeaux, he specialised in the radiological diagnosis and radiotherapeutic treatment of cancer.

During the Nazi occupation, Jean Auriac and André Bergez founded in 1941 the Auriac-Bergez intelligence group within the "Confrérie Notre-Dame" (Notre-Dame Brotherhood) Resistance network, which was tasked with passing on information about Nazi military installations to the Free French in London. Betrayed by an agent who had infiltrated the group, he was arrested on 18 July 1941 on the premises of the Faculty of Medicine. Released on bail for the night following an initial interrogation, he committed suicide by ingesting mercury cyanide so as not to betray the members of his group. After the Liberation of France, Jean Auriac was posthumously awarded numerous honours and was officially recognised in 1946 as a member of the Resistance and an agent of the French Liberation Army ("Forces Françaises Combattantes").

== Biography ==
=== Background and family ===
Jean-Jacques Auriac, known as Jean Auriac, was born on 9 May 1906 in La Roche-sur-Yon (Vendée). His parents, Oscar Auriac (1878–1949), born in Betchat, and Anne Marie Jalabert (1880–1960), born in Saint-Girons, came from families in the Ariège region. His father, Oscar Auriac, a secondary-school teacher (agrégé) of philosophy, was Inspector-General of French Public Education and Director of the École Normale Supérieure in Saint-Cloud.

His brother, Pierre Auriac (1911–2004), a general practitioner, French collegiate fencing champion in 1936, joined the Brutus network of the Bordeaux Resistance in 1943. He was involved in organising the escape via Spain of allied airmen whose plane had been shot down. In 1944, he travelled clandestinely by car to Spain with two American airmen and was interned at the Miranda de Ebro concentration camp. He managed to reach Algeria, where he joined the Commandos de France in an elite paratrooper unit. Wounded several times, he took part in the Liberation of Belfort, then in the campaigns in Germany and Austria.

=== Education ===
Jean Auriac (4th from the left) during his medical training in the service of Professor Pierre Mauriac (in the centre)

Jean Auriac attended secondary school in Montpellier and Nancy. A diligent pupil who devoted his time to reading, he was nicknamed the "little philosopher" by his family. In 1923, he obtained his baccalaureate in Latin and science, followed by another in philosophy. He considered continuing his studies at the École Polytechnique, but was advised against it on medical grounds due to his severe myopia. He was awarded a bachelor of science in physics from the faculty of sciences in Bordeaux in 1928, whilst also studying pharmacy. He obtained his degree in pharmacy from the faculty of medicine and pharmacy in Bordeaux in 1929.

He then embarked on medical studies and passed in 1929 the entrance examination to serve as extern of the hospitals of Bordeaux. He took up a post as a research assistant in physics in the department of Professor Georges Réchou at the Centre régional de lutte contre le cancer (Regional Cancer Centre, now the Institut Bergonié) founded in Bordeaux by Professor Jean Bergonié in 1923. Auriac became a resident doctor at that centre in 1935 and trained in the treatment of cancer using radiotherapy. He chose this subject for his doctoral thesis in medicine, entitled Contribution à la dosimétrie en rœntgenthérapie de voltage élevé (Contribution to dosimetry in high-voltage Rœntgen therapy), which he defended on 28 July 1937. The thesis was awarded the Godard gold medal for theses defended at the Faculty of Medicine and Pharmacy in Bordeaux, and the doctoral award from the French Society of Medical Radiology.

=== Medical and academic career ===
Radiation therapy at the Cancer Treatment Center in Bordeaux in the 1930s

Jean Auriac was a senior registrar in medical physics in 1937–1938. In 1939, he tied for first place in the agrégation examination in medicine and was appointed professor in medical physics at the Faculty of Medicine and Pharmacy in Bordeaux on 1 November 1939. He was appointed assistant radiologist at the Haut-Lévêque hospital sanatorium in Pessac (Gironde). His research and publications focused on the radiological diagnosis and radiotherapy of cancers using Rœntgen therapy and brachytherapy, as well as on biological physics (densitometry, X-ray dosimetry, atmospheric ionisation, etc.).

== Involvement in the French Resistance during the Second World War ==
=== The Outbreak of the Second World War ===
When Second World War was declared in France on 3 September 1939, Jean Auriac was exempted from military service due to his severe short-sightedness. Following the defeat of the French army, Jean Auriac disapproved of the speech given by Dean Pierre Mauriac on 25 October 1940 at the opening ceremony of the Faculty of Medicine and Pharmacy. Pierre Mauriac, brother of François Mauriac, was a member of Action Française and actively supported Marshal Philippe Pétain and the Vichy regime throughout the Nazi Occupation of France. The day after this speech, Jean Auriac wrote to his parents: "Alas! There were two Corneilles; there will be two Mauriacs, and not all Pierres are alike".

=== Formation of the Auriac-Bergez resistance group ===
During the Nazi occupation, Jean Auriac joined the Resistance in early 1941. He was a friend of Dr André Chauvanet, a former student at the Faculty of Medicine in Bordeaux and a surgeon at Thouars Hospital, who had formed an action group as early as July 1940. This group was coordinated by Gilbert Renault, aka "Colonel Rémy", a secret agent who liaised between the domestic Resistance and Free France in London. Rémy tasked Chauvanet with organising an intelligence network, aimed in particular at gathering information on Nazi military installations to be passed on to London.

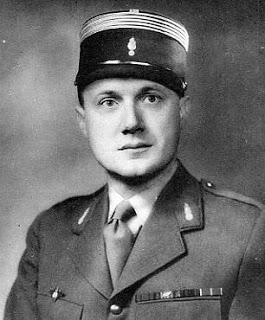
Colonel Rémy, secret agent of Free France

On 4 February 1941, Auriac, together with André Bergez (1923–1943), a student at the Bordeaux School of Hydrography, founded the Auriac-Bergez group within the "Confrérie Notre-Dame" (Notre-Dame Brotherhood), one of the first intelligence networks of the Bureau central de renseignements et d'action (Central Bureau of Intelligence and Action).

Auriac was the regional leader of the group, which was made up of resistance fighters from Bordeaux. Their mission was to gather information on the occupying forces at the port of Bordeaux and Bordeaux-Mérignac Airport, as well as on factories working for the Nazi army. From April 1941 onwards, Auriac served as the liaison officer responsible for passing this information on to London.

=== Betrayal by an undercover agent, arrest and suicide ===
The Auriac-Bergez group was infiltrated by Geneviève Sauvaneix, an employee of the prefecture. She was acting on the orders of Police Commissioner Pierre Poinsot, who worked for both the Vichy regime and the Gestapo, and of Georges Reige, chief of staff to Prefect François Pierre-Alype. The members of the Auriac-Bergez group began to arrested on 15 July 1941. Jean Auriac was arrested on 18 July 1941 by a French police officer and a German police officer on the premises of the Faculty of Medicine and Pharmacy, just as he was about to take part in a university examination board meeting. On searching his home, the police found several incriminating documents, including a list of the names of members of his group. He was taken to the police station and questioned by Inspector Poinsot from 7 pm to 9 pm. He declared that he knew André Bergez solely as a patient whom he had treated for gonorrhoea, and disclosed no information about the group. Poinsot allowed him to return home for the night, after threatening to take action against his parents if he fled, and making it clear that he would get him to talk the following day.

Portrait of Jean Auriac during his intership (1935)

Auriac refused to flee to the Zone libre (Free Zone), as suggested by his brother Pierre and a friend. During the night, he managed to evade the police officers guarding his home and left via a rear entrance of his residence at 160 Boulevard George V in Bordeaux. At around 11 pm, he broke into the Bergonié Institute by climbing over the gate, and retrieved two ampoules of mercury cyanide after smashing a pane of glass to open the medicine cabinet. He went back home, wrote farewell letters to his parents and brother, in which he apologised for the distress he was causing them, and explained that his suicide was intended to protect the other members of the group and to avoid compromising his loved ones by fleeing: "It’s hard, but necessary". He turned on the gas after leaving a warning note for the cleaner, locked his cat in another room, and swallowed the cyanide at 3.30 am (he noted the time on a piece of paper). He died on 19 July 1941. His funeral took place on 21 July 1941, and was attended by several thousand people lining the streets of Bordeaux. He was buried in the cemetery at Saint Girons (Ariège).

=== After Jean Auriac’s suicide ===
==== The demise of the Auriac-Bergez group ====
No member of the Auriac-Bergez group survived; all were executed or died in deportation. Dr André Chauvanet later testified that Jean Auriac’s suicide helped to save other resistance fighters: "Personally, I owe my life to him, as do other activists; I know of no purer act of sacrifice than his". Commissioner Poinsot stated in the report on the Auriac-Bergez group that "Professor Auriac’s suicide will prevent the full light from being shed on this affair".

==== Reactions within the Faculty of Medicine and Pharmacy of Bordeaux ====
The Dean of the Faculty of Medicine and Pharmacy, Pierre Mauriac, who had remained silent following the arrest of a professor on university premises and did not attend his funeral, referred to Jean Auriac’s suicide during his opening address at the Faculty of Medicine and Pharmacy on 3 November 1941:

"[…] Professor Barthe has passed away, and after him one of your most beloved young lecturers, Professor Auriac, whose scruples, conscience and sensitivity were so deeply stirred by the harsh upheavals of the times that he was broken and collapsed, leaving behind only the memory of a name now linked to the tragedy of the moment. [...] shame on those who find the energy only in the shadows to scrawl foolish graffiti on walls or to become involved in derisory plots; a curse upon those whose cowardly, anonymous attacks exact the appalling ransom of hostages shot to death."

In the administrative charges filed against Pierre Mauriac in the epuration légale (legal purge) carried out after the Liberation, these remarks were accused of having had the effect of: "[…] masking, under the general terms of a writer’s psychology, the discrete background and true significance (which one could at the time surmise, if not know exactly) of the suicide of the young professor Auriac".

After the Liberation, Jean Auriac’s memory was honoured by the Faculty of Medicine and Pharmacy of Bordeaux. His name figures at the top of the list on the memorial dedicated to members of the university who Died for France. A commemorative plaque designed by Carlo Sarrabezolles and based on Jean Auriac’s death mask was installed in the university atrium, and a lecture theatre in the physics laboratory was named after Auriac to commemorate "the heroic sacrifice of the most dearly missed and youngest of our teachers".

Memorials to Jean Auriac at Bordeaux University

==== Official recognition of his status as a member of the French Resistance ====
On 2 February 1946, Jean Auriac was officially recognised as a P2 agent of the French Liberation Army ("Forces Françaises Combattantes") from 1 January 1941 to 19 July 1941, within the "Confrérie Notre-Dame" intelligence network, with the title of 3rd-class mission officer and the equivalent rank of second lieutenant. He was posthumously awarded numerous honours, including the Legion of Honour and the 1939–1945 War Cross, with the following citation:

"Enlisted in April 1941. Active propagandist amongst the youth. Adviser to a paramilitary and intelligence organisation composed of young people from Bordeaux (leaders A. Bergez and Vilain, executed). Placed his organisation under the control of our network to establish contact with the Free French Forces. Acted as a "mailbox". Arrested following a denunciation on 18 July 1941, he took his own life to avoid the risk of contradicting his comrades’ poorly prepared alibis."

== Tributes and distinctions ==
Memorial to Oscar and Jean Auriac in Saint-Girons

=== Tributes ===
- A memorial to the 1939–1945 war, dedicated to Oscar and Jean Auriac, was unveiled in Saint-Girons (Ariège) on 25 June 1950. The monument was created by Patrice Bonnet and Carlo Sarrabezolles following a national fundraising campaign. An inscription reproduces part of Oscar Auriac’s speech delivered during the farewell ceremony before the students of the École Normale Supérieure in Saint-Cloud, in which he spoke of his son Jean:
  "I, too, shall no longer see the sun, but the luminous memory of my years at Saint-Cloud, combined with the clear image of a gentle proud son who became my role model because he knew how to master life, and who entered the darkness of death without fear."
- The junior high school in Arveyres (Gironde) was named after Jean Auriac in 1994.
- Several streets in the Bordeaux metropolitan area are named after Jean Auriac: Rue (street) Oscar et Jean Auriac in Bordeaux; Rue du Professeur Jean Auriac in Villenave-d’Ornon; and Rue Jean Auriac in Lormont.

Certificate awarded by Field Marshal Montgomery

=== Honours ===
- Resistance Medal, awarded posthumously on 17 May 1945.
- 1939–1945 War Cross with a vermillion star, awarded posthumously on 10 November 1945.
- Certificate of Dedication to the Cause of European Freedom awarded by Field Marshal Montgomery on 6 May 1946.
- Chevalier of Legion of Honour, awarded posthumously on 18 August 1947.
- National accolade Mort pour la France (Died for France) on 23 August 1948.
