= Madeleine Cestari =

French Resistance fighter and deportee

- Born: 7 October 1921; Vannes, France
- Died: 12 August 2016 (aged 94); Vannes, France

Madeleine Cestari (7 October 1921 – 12 August 2016) was a French Resistance fighter from France. A member of the Confrérie Notre-Dame network, she was arrested in 1942 and deported to the Ravensbrück concentration camp in 1944.

== Biography ==
Born Madeleine Alice Renault on 7 October 1921 in Vannes to Léon Renault, professor of philosophy and English and inspector general of an insurance company and her Marie Decker, daughter of composer Théodore Decker. Madeleine Renault came from a family of ten. Her brother was Gilbert Renault, Colonel Rémy and her sister was Maisie Renault. Her other siblings included Isabelle, born on 26 August 1923 and also deported, and Philippe, born 29 March 1915, deported and later killed in Lübeck-Neustadt Bay, 3 May 1945, both members of the Confrérie Notre Dame-Castille network. With her sister, Cestari was arrested in 1942 by the Gestapo. She was imprisoned in Vannes, in the Royallieu-Compiègne internment camp and in Romainville, before being deported to the Ravensbrück concentration camp. She survived there, with her sister, until the camp was liberated by the Soviet Army in April 1945. She died on 12 August 2016 in Vannes.

== Honors ==
- Knight of the Legion of Honor
- Croix de Guerre 1939-1945
- Resistance Medal
