= I Am Pierre Riviere =

1976 film directed by Christine Lipinska

- Film poster
- Directed by: Christine Lipinska
- Written by: Christine Lipinska; Régis Hanrion
- Starring: Jacques Spiesser
- Cinematography: Jean Monsigny
- Edited by: Agnès Molinard
- Production company: Les Films de l'Ecluse
- Distributed by: UZ Diffusion
- Release date: 7 April 1976
- Running time: 82 minutes
- Country: France
- Language: French

I Am Pierre Riviere (French: Je suis Pierre Rivière) is a 1976 French drama film directed by Christine Lipinska.

== Plot ==
The film is based on documents compiled by French philosopher Michel Foucault. In a Normandy village in 1835, a young man, Pierre Rivière, murdered his mother, sister and brother before fleeing to the countryside.

Using a cast of local villagers, the film uses detailed and historically accurate re-enactments to create an intense, disturbing atmosphere. The crime and resultant trial is recounted from varied perspectives, including Pierre's confession. The result is a rich, complex narrative that interrogates truth and history.

== Cast ==
- Jacques Spiesser - Pierre Rivière
- André Rouyer - Le président du tribunal
- Max Vialle - François Lecomte
- Francis Huster - L'avocat de la défense
- Michel Robin - Le père
- Thérèse Quentin - La mère
- Mado Maurin - La grand-mère
- Marianne Epin - Victoire (as Marianne Épin)
- Isabelle Huppert - Aimée
- Vincent Ropion - Pierre enfant
- Claude Bouchery - Le premier médecin
- Michel Delahaye - Le second médecin
- Roger Jacquet - Le bûcheron
- François Dyrek - L'homme de la battue
- Patrick Floersheim - Le curé

== See also ==
- Bruno Reidal
- Isabelle Huppert on screen and stage

== Notes ==
- Foucault, Michel (1982). I, Pierre Riviére, Having Slaughtered My Mother, My Sister, and My Brother: A Case of Parricide in the 19th Century. University of Nebraska Press. ISBN 978-0803268579.
