= Coco (2009 film) =

Film by Gad Elmaleh

- Directed by: Gad Elmaleh
- Written by: Gad Elmaleh; Caroline Thivel
- Produced by: Ilan Goldman
- Starring: Gad Elmaleh
- Cinematography: Gilles Henry
- Edited by: Jennifer Augé
- Music by: Stéphane Lopez
- Production companies: Légende; Légende Films; K2 Cinéma; StudioCanal; TF1 Films Production
- Distributed by: StudioCanal
- Release date: 18 March 2009
- Running time: 1:35:00
- Country: France
- Language: French
- Budget: $14.2 million
- Box office: $25.5 million

Coco is a 2009 French comedy film written, directed, and starring Gad Elmaleh. The film is based on a character sketch he created for his one-man show "La Vie Normale". The film earned $8.5 million in its opening weekend at the French box office, and went on to gross $11.7 million in the European market. Although it was a box office success, Coco was not well received by critics. It received only one star out of four from Première, Paris Match, and Télérama, and two stars from Elle and Le Journal du Dimanche.

== Synopsis ==
Coco is a wealthy Maghrebi Jewish businessman and an immigrant to France. After 15 years of financial success (due to his invention of a new type of sparkling water) he decides to throw an enormous bar mitzvah celebration for his son Samuel. Determined that the celebration will be the most fantastic event of the year, Coco alienates his entire family as he plans for the gala.

== Cast ==
- Gad Elmaleh: Coco
- Pascale Arbillot: Agathe
- Jean Benguigui: Zerbib
- Manu Payet: Steve
- Ary Abittan: Max
- Daniel Cohen: Mimo
- Noémie Lvovsky: Brigitte
- Gladys Cohen: Évelyne
- Nicolas Jouxtel: Samuel
- Léane Grimaud: Julia
- Gérard Depardieu: The cardiologist
- Enrico Macias: The tailor
- Jacques Spiesser: The prefect
- François Berland: Monsieur Daumergue
- Charlotte Desgeorges: Patricia
- Étienne Draber: Mronsieur Colfontaine
- Anne Haybel: Madame Colfontaine
- Alexandre Knafo: Lucas
- Fariza Kraria: Madame Zamzem
- Laurence Oltuski: Chloé
- Ahmed Riyasat: Chandra
- Alexis Sellam: Melloul
- Isaac Sharry: Isaac
- Mercedès Zarka: Aunt Mercedès
