= Louis de La Bardonnie =

Louis de La Bardonnie, born October 11, 1902, died in 1987, owner-winemaker at Saint Antoine-de-Breuilh in the Dordogne (South-West of France), was a member of the French Resistance during World War II. His code name was "Isabelle."

== Biography ==
Louis de La Bardonnie joined the resistance in the month of June 1940.

In Saint-Antoine-de-Breuilh, he was one of the first to be recruited by Gilbert Renault, codename "Remy", into the network that would later become the Confrérie Notre-Dame (Notre Dame Brotherhood or CND). With his friends Paul Armbruster (alias "Alaric"), du Fleix, Pierre Beausoleil (allias Pierrot) and his wife Simone, Dr. Gaston Pailloux (alias "Alceste"), Paul Dungler and others, he harvested a lot of information valuable for the allies.

At the end of November 1940, he was charged with developing and organizing the CND-Castille network.

Louis de La Bardonnie organized checkpoints along the demarcation line. He was responsible for creating sub-networks from Bordeaux and Brest. Its castle of La Roque featured a lot of resistance.

The first transmitter of the France free zone was set-in at La Roque Castle in February 1941. The first radio link with London took place on March 17, 1941.

Denounced, Louis de La Bardonnie was arrested on 16 November 1941. He was interrogated and interned in the Camp of Mérignac (detention centre guarded by CSS Pichey Beaudésert). He was finally released in the spring of 1942 due to lack of evidence.

He narrowly escaped the Gestapo in 1943 and then led a wandering life until the Battle of Rocamadour, where, wounded in battle, he was obliged to stand down.

He died in 1987.

== Recognition ==
The town of Bergerac in Dordogne has named a square after Louis de La Bardonnie.
