= Sonia Steinsapir =

Russian-born artist (1912–1980)

Sonia Steinsapir, née Sophie Chteinsapir, (1912–1980), was of Jewish descent, born in Tsarist Russia, and became an artist, illustrator, painter and lithographer. She survived the Holocaust in France during the Nazi Occupation of World War II. Her work, which depicts life in internment camps, can be found at two French museums and private collections.

== Biography ==
Sonia Steinsapir was born in 1912 and grew up in Moscow as the only child of David Chteinsapir and Rachel Meerson (1891–1933). Her father, a doctor, was mobilized during the First World War and died in 1918 in Yalta (Crimea) from wounds he received in combat. A few years later, her mother took her to live in Berlin, where Sonia studied at the Academy of Fine Arts after attending a German high school. Mother and daughter then returned to Moscow, where Sonia worked for a publishing house and later an advertising agency.

=== Life in France ===
After her mother's death, Steinsapir escaped the Stalinist purges in Russia and returned to Paris in 1936, moving in with her uncle, Lazare Meerson, a French film art director and set designer. In 1937, Steinsapir enrolled as a student at the École des Beaux-Arts in Paris. Meerson and his wife were close to the filmmaker René Clair, so they were able to introduce Steinsapir to members of Parisian artistic circles during the interwar period. But, despite René Clair's support, Steinsapir could not obtain French citizenship through naturalization. The Occupation and subsequent anti-Jewish laws forced her to quit her studies. On 11 July 1941, she attempted to cross the demarcation line near Langon in the Gironde region to escape to the unoccupied zone. But, during the attempt, she was arrested and sent to the Merignac internment camp, near Bordeaux, France.

=== Surviving internment ===
During her internment at the Mérignac camp, she documented, through her drawings in a notebook, the daily lives of those considered "undesirable" who were imprisoned with her there: communists, anti-fascists, foreigners, suspects, vagrants, prostitutes, Jews and people then referred to as Nomads (including Gypsies and Roma people). In October of that year, she was transferred to the Poitiers camp from which she managed to escape on 30 December 1941. She joined the Paris resistance in 1942 and benefited from the assistance and protection of resistance leader Gabrielle Buffet-Picabia, at the International Student Residence. Going underground, she was helped by groups providing aid to the Jewish population. Using false identification papers, she moved around the capital city and gained access to a lithographic press, with which she produced a series of artistic works about her internment in 1942. She lived in hiding from 1942 to 1944.

After the Liberation of France, Steinsapir resumed her studies at the École des Beaux-Arts in Paris. To support herself, she worked various jobs (as a children's book illustrator, draftswoman and archivist). From 1963 to 1972, she worked at the National Museum of Popular Arts and Traditions, and from 1973 to 1975 at the Bibliothèque nationale de France (Paris Library). During this time, she also exhibited with the Groupement des Artistes Juifs de France (Group of Jewish Artists of France), as well as in various art salons. She died in Paris in 1980 at the age of 68.

=== Legacy ===
The drawings, as well as the lithographs she produced from them, provide a valuable record of daily life in the Mérignac internment camp. Her works are now held in collections at the Museum of Art and History of Judaism (Paris), the Museum of European and Mediterranean Civilisations (MuCEM Marseille) and private collections.
