= Faustine et le Bel Été =

1972 film

- Film poster
- Directed by: Nina Companéez
- Written by: Nina Companéez
- Produced by: Mag Bodard
- Starring: Muriel Catalá
- Cinematography: Ghislain Cloquet
- Edited by: Raymonde Guyot
- Music by: Bruno Rigutto
- Distributed by: Cinema International Corporation
- Release date: 12 January 1972
- Running time: 98 minutes
- Country: France
- Language: French
- Box office: 433,892 admissions (France)

Faustine et le Bel Été is a 1972 French romantic drama film directed by Nina Companéez. It was screened out of competition at the 1972 Cannes Film Festival.

== Plot ==
Faustine, a romantic teenager, decides to spend her summer in the countryside with her grandparents. Upon her arrival she briefly meets a teenager named Joachim and quickly becomes obsessed with his family, spying on them from a distance.

Eventually she begins to integrate herself in to their lives, befriending Joachim's cousins, flirting with Joachim himself and developing a crush on his uncle.

== Cast ==
- Muriel Catalá - Faustine
- Claire Vernet - Claire
- Jacques Spiesser - Florent
- Francis Huster - Joachim
- Georges Marchal - Julien
- Isabelle Adjani - Camille
- Marianne Eggerickx - Ariane
- Maurice Garrel - Jean
- Jacques Weber - Haroun
- Valentine Varela - Marie
- Pierre Plessis - Henri, the Grandfather
- Andrée Tainsy - The Grandmother
- Virginie Thévenet - Student 1
- Isabelle Huppert - Student #2
- César Torres - Haroun's Friend

== See also ==
- Isabelle Huppert on screen and stage
