= Merignac internment camp =

World War II internment and transit camp in Nazi-occupied France

Mérignac internment camp
- Transit camp
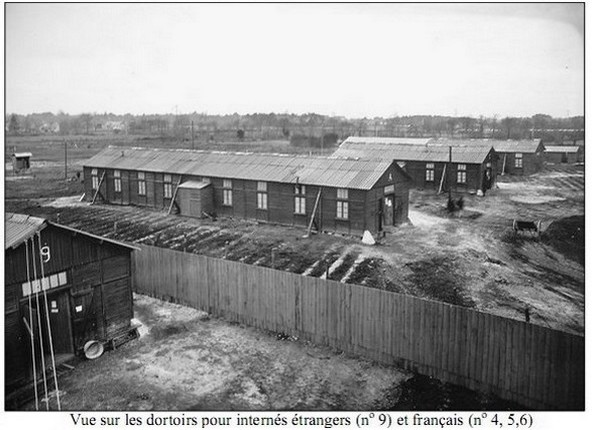
- Barracks at the Mérignac internment camp

- Location of Mérignac in France
- Coordinates: 44°50′44.29″N 0°41′29.34″W
- Other names: Camp of Beaudésert; Camp of Mérignac-Beaudésert
- Location: Mérignac, Gironde, German-occupied France
- Operated by: French authorities (under German supervision); Nazi Germany
- Original use: Prison
- Operational: 17 November 1940 – 26 August 1944
- Inmates: Roma, political detainees, French and foreign Jews
- Number of inmates: 8,730 (Note: Estimate made by the Gironde prefecture in 1949.)
- Liberated by: French Resistance
- Notable inmates: Louis de La Bardonnie; Robert Aron

The Mérignac internment camp, also known as Beaudésert, was a transit and internment facility (Note: Transit camps briefly held prisoners before deportation to other Nazi camps.) operated by French and German authorities in Nazi-occupied France during the Second World War. Located in the Beaudésert district of Mérignac, near Bordeaux, it was established in 1940 to detain Roma, Jews, political prisoners, and members of the French Resistance. Inmates were held before deportation to concentration camps or execution.

After the Liberation in August 1944, the camp remained in use under French control and played a role in the internment of suspected collaborators. It continued operating under French administration until its closure in 1948. The site was later redeveloped, and no original structures remain.

== History ==
=== Establishment and early use ===
In 1938, the government of Édouard Daladier issued a decree establishing detention centres for "undesirable foreigners". Following the Spanish Civil War, more than 450,000 refugees crossed into France. In response, prefectural authorities repurposed a former laundry in the Beaudésert district near Mérignac as a temporary shelter.

After the Fall of France in 1940, the German authorities briefly used the facility as a prison before converting it into an internment camp. On 17 November 1940, under orders from the Bordeaux German Field Command, François-Pierre Alype, the prefect of Gironde, oversaw the internment of Roma detainees, including children. The camp, designated a confinement centre (camp de séjour surveillé), comprised a wooden barrack, a former hospital laundry building, and 30 caravans serving as temporary accommodations. The facility was enclosed by a barbed-wire perimeter, with French gendarmerie assigned to oversee security under the direction of René Rousseau, the camp's appointed administrator. By December 1940, internees had constructed 20 barracks. Between 297 and 321 individuals, more than half of whom were children, were detained until 1 December 1940, when German authorities ordered its closure and transferred the detainees, most notably to the Poitiers camp.

=== Expansion of internments ===
Following the removal of Roma detainees in late 1940, the Vichy Ministry of the Interior authorised funding to expand the Mérignac site into a permanent internment facility. The departmental architect, acting on orders from the prefecture, divided the camp into two sections: one for political prisoners and another for foreign nationals classified as indésirables.

As arrests increased, particularly those targeting communist activists, detainees were first held at the Hôtel des Migrants in Bordeaux. On 13 March 1941, they were transferred to Mérignac, with additional groups of political prisoners arriving the following week. This marked the formal separation of the camp into a political detainee section, overseen by the prefect's office, and a foreign detainee section, administered by the Foreigners Service.

By April 1941, the internment population had expanded to include foreign Jews and women accused of prostitution. Jewish detainees, arrested in anti-Jewish raids, were temporarily held at Mérignac before being transferred to the Drancy internment camp. From there, most were deported to Nazi extermination camps and murdered. Within the camp, Jewish prisoners were segregated from the general population. In June 1941, following a sabotage attack in Pessac, 40 members of the French Resistance were arrested. Initially imprisoned at Fort du Hâ in Bordeaux, they were later transferred to Mérignac.

=== Executions and deportations ===
The German authorities routinely selected detainees from Mérignac for execution in retaliation for French Resistance attacks. On 24 October 1941, following an assault on German personnel in Bordeaux, 50 hostages were executed at Camp de Souge; 35 of the victims had been interned at Mérignac. In September 1942, a further 70 detainees from the camp were executed at Souge. This action was ordered in reprisal for the assassination of German military adviser (Kriegsverwaltungsrat) Hans Gottfried Reimers by Resistance operatives. The executions were overseen by SS-Sturmbannführer Herbert Hagen.

Between July 1942 and June 1943, several convoys transported Jewish detainees from Mérignac to the Drancy internment camp. From there, they were deported to Nazi extermination camps, where most were murdered. The recorded deportations include:

- First convoy – Departed 18 July 1942, carrying 171 deportees.
- Second convoy – Departed 26 August 1942, carrying 444 deportees, including 57 children.
- Third convoy – Departed 19 October 1942, carrying 73 deportees.

Between February and June 1943, 107 more people departed from Merignac, by December 1943, no Jewish prisoners remained at the camp. Deportations from the Gironde region continued until June 1944 under the direction of Maurice Papon, who had been appointed prefect in June 1942.

=== Liberation ===
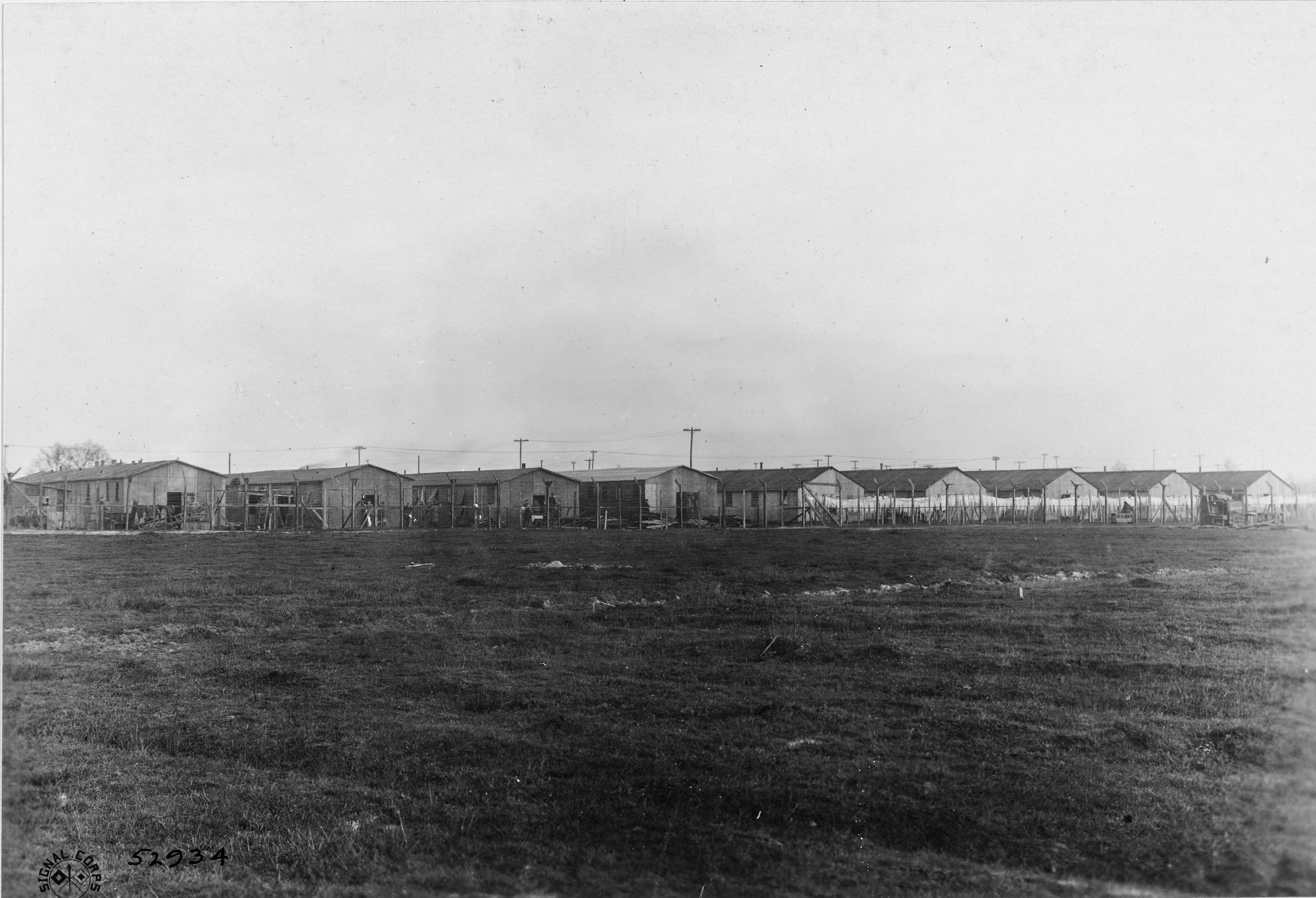
Barracks at the POW camp in Mérignac, 1948.

On 26 August 1944, as German forces withdrew from Bordeaux, the French Forces of the Interior (Forces Françaises de l'Intérieur) liberated the Mérignac internment camp. The remaining detainees, imprisoned under Vichy policies, were released.

Following the Liberation, the camp continued to operate under the authority of the provisional French government. It played a significant role in the process of épuration, the postwar purge of collaborators. Detainees held before August 1944 were joined by new internees awaiting judicial proceedings.

The camp's postwar population included suspected collaborators, members of the Milice, German civilians, and a large number of women. The new administration imposed stricter regulations on the facility, which by September 1944 held up to 900 internees of both sexes. On 15 October 1944, a large group of women was transferred to Mérignac under government orders. Many were later relocated to Eysines, a satellite annex of the camp. The internees included female collaborators, women married to German soldiers, German nationals, and others accused of aiding the occupation forces.

=== Post liberation and closure ===
On 10 May 1946, a legal decree officially marked the end of hostilities in France, leading to the cessation of administrative internment. The Mérignac site was repurposed as a temporary detention centre for foreign nationals who had entered the country illegally. It was later redesignated as a regional immigration facility, primarily housing political refugees, most of them Spanish nationals. The camp officially closed on 15 May 1948.

Despite its closure, the abandoned barracks continued to shelter unauthorised occupants. By 1953, an estimated 200 people were living on-site in basic conditions. In the late 1950s, the last of the camp's structures were dismantled, and the area was eventually redeveloped as a quarry.

== Notable inmates ==
- Louis de La Bardonnie – Member of the French Resistance
- Robert Aron – French historian and writer
- Sonia Steinsapir – Russian-born artist

== See also ==
- The Holocaust in France
- Holocaust train
- Internment camps in France
