= Little Marcel =

1976 film by Jacques Fansten

- Directed by: Jacques Fansten
- Written by: Jacques Fansten; Jean-Claude Grumberg
- Produced by: Yves Robert
- Starring: Jacques Spiesser
- Cinematography: Jean Gonnet
- Edited by: Jean-Baptiste de Battista
- Music by: Graeme Allwright
- Distributed by: Gaumont Distribution
- Release date: 7 April 1976
- Running time: 105 minutes
- Country: France
- Language: French

Little Marcel (French: Le Petit Marcel) is a 1976 French drama film directed by Jacques Fansten.

== Cast ==
- Jacques Spiesser - Marcel
- Isabelle Huppert - Yvette
- Yves Robert - Commissaire Mancini
- Michel Aumont - Taron
- Pierre-Olivier Scotto - Bernard
- Anouk Ferjac - Marie-Paule Mancini
- Jean Dasté - Berger
- Maurice Bénichou - Garcia
- Hubert Gignoux - The mayor
- Jean Lescot - The Dantec
- Jean-François Balmer - Pottier
- Roland Bertin - Toutain
- Jean-Michel Dupuis - Denis
- Jean Benguigui

== See also ==
- Isabelle Huppert on screen and stage
