= Confrérie Notre-Dame =

French resistance group in World War II

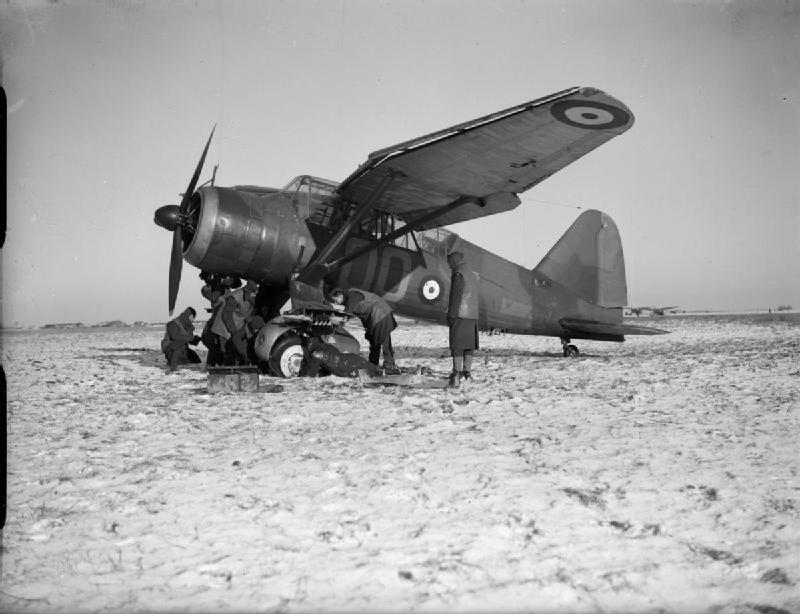

The Confrérie Notre-Dame (French pronunciation: [kɔ̃fʁeʁi nɔtʁə dam]; CND), later called the CND-Castille, was a French resistance group founded by Colonel Rémy. It was joined by other anti-Nazi Catholics from France.

== History ==
Founded before the end of 1940, the Notre-Dame Brotherhood was an information agency, and part of the Free French Forces. It was one of the first agencies of the Central Office of Information and Action (BCRA). Devastated on several occasions, always reappearing, it took the name of NDT-Castille after the terrible blow carried against it by the Germans in November 1943. The Notre-Dame Brotherhood never ceased sending mail to London, by air and maritime routes as well as by transmitters parachuted into occupied France. Its information was often crucial for the enactment of allied military operations, in particular the Bruneval raid in February 1942.

== Notable members ==
- Jean Auriac (1906-1941), professor of medicine who committed suicide by ingesting mercury cyanide so as not to betray the members of his group after his arrestation in July 1941
- Maisie Renault (1907 – 2003) was arrested in 1942 and deported to the Ravensbrück concentration camp in 1944.
- Madeleine Cestari (1912 – 2016)
- Bernard Anquetil (1916 – 1941) was murdered in 1941 at Fort du Mont Valerien (Suresnes, France/Frankreich) Place of birth: Bernieres-d'Ailly, (Calvados (14), France)
- Pierre Brossolette (1903 – 1944)
- Louis Faurichon de La Bardonnie / *Louis de La Bardonnie (1902 – 1987)
- Gilbert Renault (1904 – 1984)

== Sources ==
- Colonel Rémy, Mémoires d'un agent secret de la France libre, 1946–1950, Raoul Solar.
  - Volume 1, Le Refus, ISBN 2-7048-0827-9.
  - Volume 2, Les Soldats du silence, ISBN 2-7048-0854-6.
  - Volume 3, La Délivrance, ISBN 2-7048-0857-0.
