= Priceless (2006 film) =

Film by Pierre Salvadori

- Theatrical release poster
- French: Hors de prix
- Directed by: Pierre Salvadori
- Written by: Pierre Salvadori; Benoît Graffin
- Produced by: Philippe Martin
- Starring: Audrey Tautou; Gad Elmaleh; Marie-Christine Adam; Jacques Spiesser; Vernon Dobtcheff; Annelise Hesme
- Cinematography: Gilles Henry
- Edited by: Isabelle Devinck
- Music by: Camille Bazbaz
- Production companies: Les Films Pelléas; France 2 Cinéma; France 3 Cinéma; Tovo Films; KS2 Productions
- Distributed by: TFM Distribution
- Release dates: 18 November 2006 (Arras); 13 December 2006 (France)
- Running time: 104 minutes
- Country: France
- Language: French
- Budget: €11.7 million
- Box office: $28 million

Priceless (French: Hors de prix, lit. 'Overpriced') is a 2006 French romantic comedy film co-written and directed by Pierre Salvadori, and starring Audrey Tautou and Gad Elmaleh. According to the director, the film is inspired by the 1961 Blake Edwards film Breakfast at Tiffany's.

== Plot ==
Jean is a timid waiter and bartender at a luxury hotel in Biarritz. Irène is a gold digger who convinces wealthy men to fund her lavish lifestyle in exchange for companionship and sex. When Irène's elderly lover Jacques gets drunk and falls asleep on her birthday, she goes to the hotel bar, where she assumes the barman is absent and Jean is a millionaire guest. Rather than correcting her, he makes her several impressive cocktails and they then drunkenly retire to the hotel's Imperial suite where they spend the night together. In the morning, Jean wakes to find that Irène has gone.

A year later, Irène returns to the hotel with Jacques, who asks her to marry him. Irène is surprised to see Jean, and he manages to conceal his occupation from her again. Jean and Irène sleep together again, but Jacques sees them and breaks off the engagement. Irène goes to Jean, pretending she gave up Jacques to be with him, but as they lie in bed together, they are discovered by guests and staff in the Imperial suite. When Irène discovers who Jean is, she walks out. However, Jean is now in love and follows her, finding her at the Côte d'Azur. Pursuing her, he spends all the money in his name to pay for her company, including his savings and pension plan, until he uses his final euro for "10 more seconds" to look into her eyes.

Irène leaves him for another rich man, and Jean is left with a hotel bill he cannot pay. Luckily, Jean is picked up by a wealthy widow, Madeleine, who pays his bills in exchange for his companionship. Irène runs into him again with a new suitor, Gilles. She is a little jealous, but now that they are "equals", she shares gold-digging tricks with Jean. Using her advice, he soon wheedles a €30,000 watch from Madeleine, after she forced him to undergo plastic surgery on his ear. On a shopping spree, Irène meets up with Jean and coyly offers him the euro for "10 more seconds".

Jean continues to prove himself a skillful gold digger. He and Irène steal away from their patrons every chance they can, falling in love in the process. On the morning of Irène's departure for Venice, Gilles catches Irène and Jean kissing on the hotel room balcony. Furious, Gilles leaves Irène at the hotel with nothing but a sarong and the swimsuit she is wearing. Jean sells his watch to buy Irène a week's stay in their hotel and a gorgeous evening gown. He also gives her an invitation to an exclusive party. Madeleine is initially upset that Jean sold his watch, but he appeases her by presenting her with a pair of diamond earrings. He claims that he pawned the watch to buy Madeleine a gift and she is pleased.

At the party that evening, Irène spots Jacques with a new young girlfriend, Agnès. While stealing a dance with Jean, Irène hatches a plan to win Jacques back again, with Jean's assistance. Jean agrees to play along and is dumped by Madeleine in the process. However, he convinces Agnès that he is a wealthy prince and seduces her away from Jacques, giving Irène a chance to steal Jacques. However, when Irène sees Jean with Agnès on the balcony, she realises she loves Jean. She runs away from Jacques and declares her love, abandoning her pursuit of a luxurious lifestyle. A barefoot Irène and Jean ride off to Italy on his scooter, using the euro coin for the toll fee.

== Cast ==
- Audrey Tautou as Irène Mercier
- Gad Elmaleh as Jean Simon
- Marie-Christine Adam as Madeleine
- Vernon Dobtcheff as Jacques
- Jacques Spiesser as Gilles
- Annelise Hesme as Agnès

== Critical response ==
On the review aggregator website Rotten Tomatoes, the film holds an approval rating of 82% based on 78 reviews, with an average rating of 6.9/10. The website's critics consensus reads, "Priceless is a light, farcical rom-com that features sharp performances from Audrey Tautou and Gad Elmaleh." Metacritic, which uses a weighted average, assigned the film a score of 72 out of 100, based on 20 critics, indicating "generally favorable reviews".

After its March 2008 premiere in the United States, Stephen Holden of The New York Times described the film as an "amusing ball of fluff that refuses to judge its characters' amoral high jinks" and a "shrewdly cast" film "winking at the vanity of wealthy voluptuaries and hustlers playing games of tainted love." Holden added that the film is "too frivolous even to be called satire." According to Mick LaSalle of the San Francisco Chronicle, what makes the film "fun" is "the harshness wrapped in a pretty package. The movie stars Audrey Tautou and Gad Elmaleh, who are about the only French stars that it's almost impossible to imagine having an active sex life. Their aura of innocence helps. Still, in America, no director could ever make this movie, even with the most innocent-seeming actors on the planet. This is way European, folks, not meant for our eyes, and, of course, that's the whole kick." LaSalle noted the following:

"Priceless is an entertaining sex farce that takes its characters to some of best hotels and most exclusive restaurants in France, and to watch it is to marvel at how some people live - and how you don't. But here's the interesting thing: Through this seduction, Priceless turns the viewer into a harlot, too, who can suddenly understand why Irene would do anything and sleep with anybody just to stay in this lifestyle. Likewise, we understand—instinctively, without thinking about it or judging it—why Jean might start sleeping with an older rich woman, just so he can stay in the hotels where Irene stays. Would you want to be the person who orders the drinks or fetches the drinks? How easy would it be to go back to normal life after confirming what you never really wanted to know, that the rich really do have it better, as in a lot better, as in money really does buy happiness? So Priceless is silly, but it's not so silly. It's pretty to look at, often very funny, but it corrupts its audience as it corrupts its characters."

In a one-star review upon the film's June 2008 release in the United Kingdom, Peter Bradshaw of The Guardian called the film a "gruesomely unfunny and tacky comedy-farce" and noted that "the whole movie slavers over bling, and has a nasty, dated air of pseudo-worldliness and ersatz sophistication. With its luxury-tourist locations, it is basically vulgar, and not in a good way, and reminded me of the opening title sequence to the 70s TV show The Persuaders!, but without that programme's charm."
