= Saint-Girons, Ariège =

Subprefecture and commune in Occitanie, France

Saint-Girons
- Subprefecture and commune
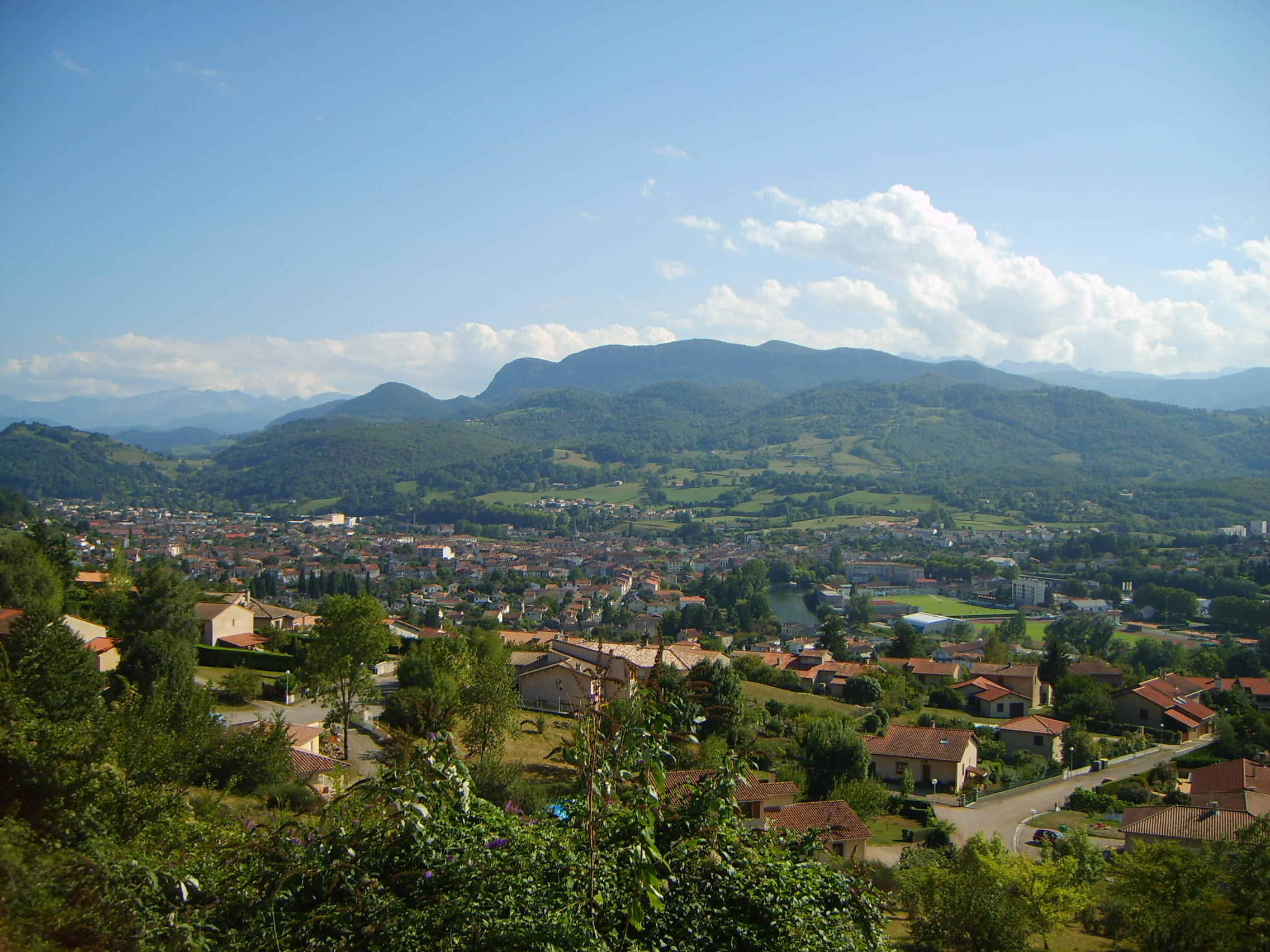
- General view of the town

- Coat of arms
- Location of Saint-Girons
- Location within France Location within Occitanie
- Coordinates: 42°59′09″N 1°08′48″E
- Country: France
- Region: Occitania
- Department: Ariège
- Arrondissement: Saint-Girons
- Canton: Couserans Ouest
- Intercommunality: Couserans-Pyrénées

Government
  - Mayor (2020–2026): Jean-Noël Vigneau
- Area^{1}: 19.13 km^{2} (7.39 sq mi)
- Elevation: 391 m (1,283 ft)
- Highest elevation: 1,200 m (3,900 ft)
- Lowest elevation: 387 m (1,270 ft)
- Population (2023): 6,008
  - Density: 314.1/km^{2} (813.4/sq mi)
- Time zone: UTC+01:00 (CET)
  - Summer (DST): UTC+02:00 (CEST)
- INSEE/Postal code: 09261 /09200
- ^{1} French Land Register data, which excludes lakes, ponds, glaciers > 1 km^{2} (0.386 sq mi or 247 acres) and river estuaries.

Saint-Girons (French pronunciation: [sɛ̃ ʒiʁɔ̃]; Languedocien: Sent Gironç) is a commune in the Ariège department in southwestern France.

== History ==
=== Antiquity ===
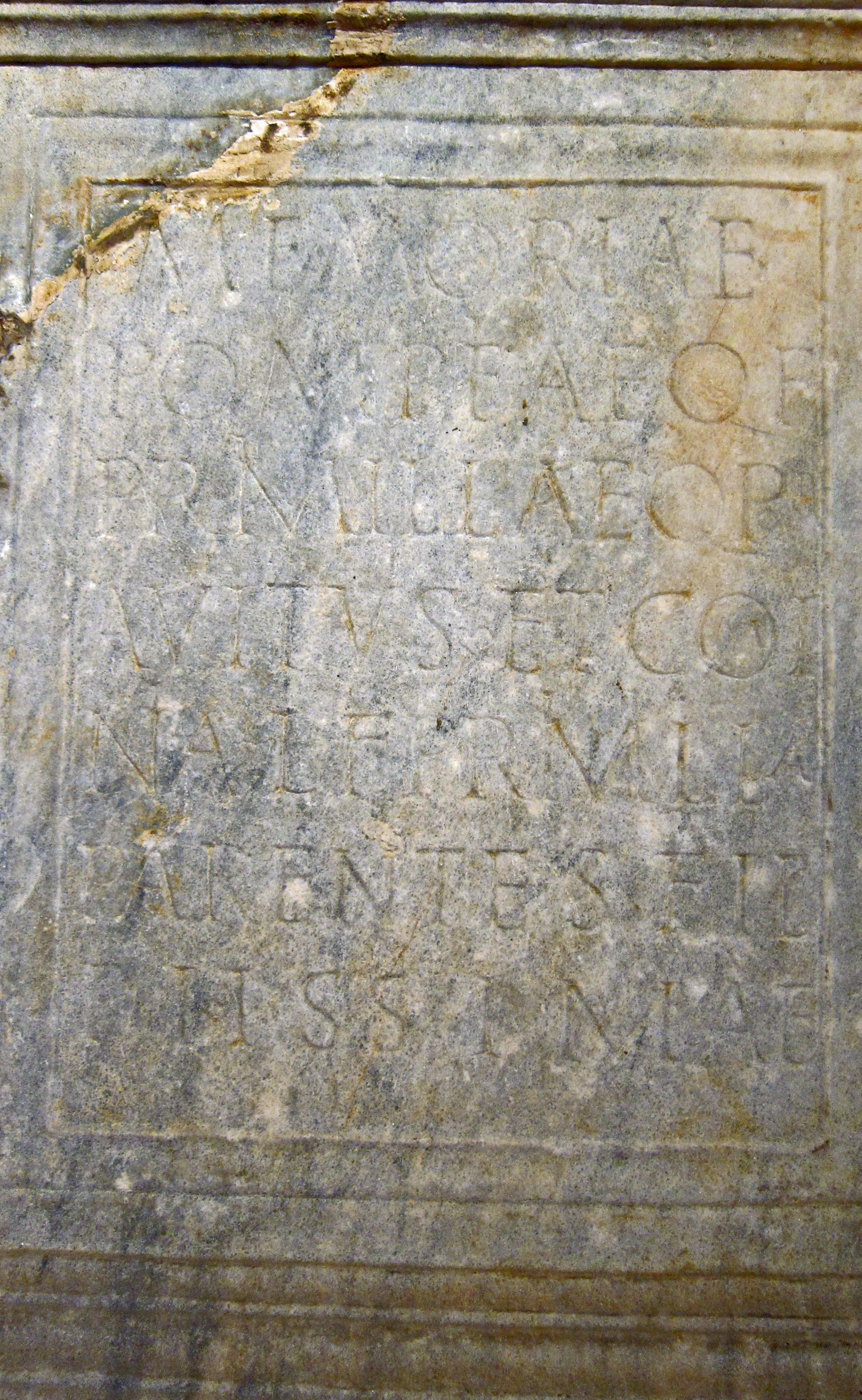
Funerary cippus to a Pompeia

Unlike its close neighbour Saint-Lizier, Saint-Girons isn't an ancient city; there was however a lucus on its present territory where some Roman finds were made during the construction of the train station in the beginning of the twentieth century. Modern-days district Le Luc is considered to owe its name to this ancient lucus.

=== Foundation ===
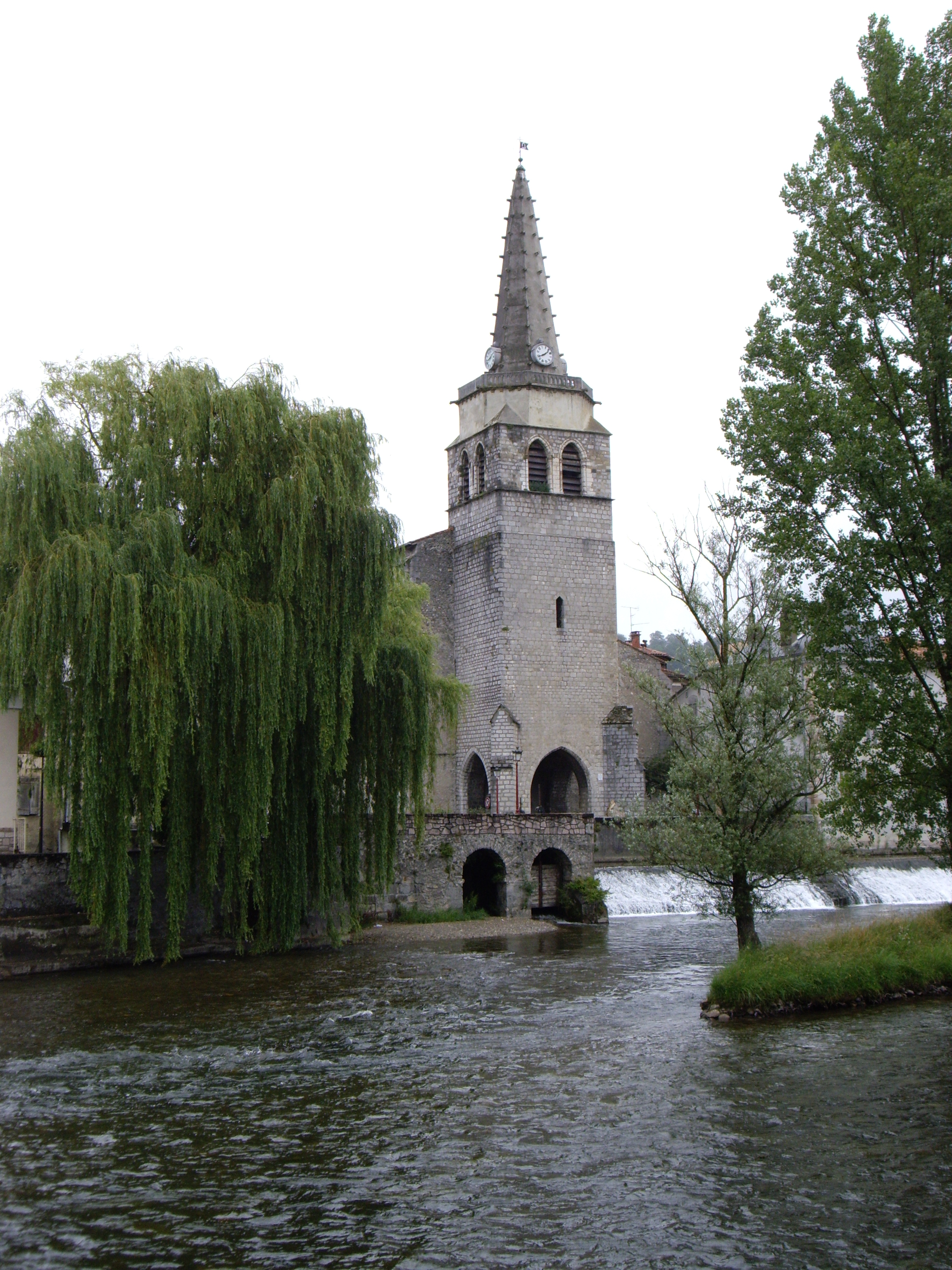
St Girons' Church by the Salat river

The city is named after Saint Girons, a saint from fifth-century Landes who evangelized Novempopulania. In the ninth century some of his relics were supposedly buried in Saint Girons' Church, around which the city later developed.

== Climate ==
Saint-Girons has a moderate but warm oceanic climate, that is quite prone to temporary vast extremes in temperature as a result of its inland position.

Climate data for Saint-Girons, Ariège, elevation 414 m (1,358 ft), (1991–2020 normals, extremes 1949–present)
Month	Jan	Feb	Mar	Apr	May	Jun	Jul	Aug	Sep	Oct	Nov	Dec	Year
Record high °C (°F)	22.5 (72.5)	31.2 (88.2)	29.0 (84.2)	29.6 (85.3)	32.9 (91.2)	38.9 (102.0)	38.2 (100.8)	39.8 (103.6)	36.5 (97.7)	33.7 (92.7)	26.4 (79.5)	25.0 (77.0)	39.8 (103.6)
Mean daily maximum °C (°F)	10.5 (50.9)	11.5 (52.7)	14.7 (58.5)	16.7 (62.1)	20.0 (68.0)	23.4 (74.1)	25.5 (77.9)	26.1 (79.0)	23.1 (73.6)	19.3 (66.7)	13.8 (56.8)	11.2 (52.2)	18.0 (64.4)
Daily mean °C (°F)	5.5 (41.9)	6.3 (43.3)	9.0 (48.2)	11.1 (52.0)	14.6 (58.3)	18.0 (64.4)	20.0 (68.0)	20.3 (68.5)	17.1 (62.8)	13.7 (56.7)	8.7 (47.7)	6.2 (43.2)	12.5 (54.5)
Mean daily minimum °C (°F)	0.5 (32.9)	1.0 (33.8)	3.3 (37.9)	5.5 (41.9)	9.1 (48.4)	12.6 (54.7)	14.6 (58.3)	14.5 (58.1)	11.2 (52.2)	8.1 (46.6)	3.6 (38.5)	1.1 (34.0)	7.1 (44.8)
Record low °C (°F)	−18.7 (−1.7)	−16.5 (2.3)	−12.8 (9.0)	−4.2 (24.4)	−1.2 (29.8)	2.2 (36.0)	5.2 (41.4)	4.7 (40.5)	1.3 (34.3)	−4.0 (24.8)	−10.2 (13.6)	−12.3 (9.9)	−18.7 (−1.7)
Average precipitation mm (inches)	82.3 (3.24)	68.6 (2.70)	73.6 (2.90)	103.7 (4.08)	106.6 (4.20)	78.1 (3.07)	59.0 (2.32)	67.4 (2.65)	73.1 (2.88)	82.0 (3.23)	98.6 (3.88)	80.2 (3.16)	973.2 (38.31)
Average precipitation days (≥ 1.0 mm)	10.7	9.9	10.4	12.1	12.2	9.7	8.0	8.4	8.5	9.9	11.0	10.1	121.1
Mean monthly sunshine hours	116.3	128.9	169.0	170.9	183.4	193.0	210.9	209.3	193.3	156.7	119.4	112.9	1,963.8
Source 1: Météo France
Source 2: Infoclimat.fr (humidity and snowy days, 1961–1990)

== Population ==
Inhabitants of Saint-Girons are called Saint-Gironnais in French.

Historical population

Year	Pop.	±% p.a.
1793	2,749	—
1800	3,054	+1.51%
1806	3,348	+1.54%
1821	3,868	+0.97%
1831	4,381	+1.25%
1836	4,282	−0.46%
1841	3,901	−1.85%
1846	4,142	+1.21%
1851	3,981	−0.79%
1856	4,005	+0.12%
1861	4,576	+2.70%
1866	4,745	+0.73%
1872	4,690	−0.19%
1876	4,953	+1.37%
1881	5,191	+0.94%
1886	5,459	+1.01%
1891	5,448	−0.04%
1896	5,915	+1.66%
1901	6,018	+0.35%

Year	Pop.	±% p.a.
1906	5,990	−0.09%
1911	5,929	−0.20%
1921	5,749	−0.31%
1926	6,178	+1.45%
1931	6,120	−0.19%
1936	6,406	+0.92%
1946	7,026	+0.93%
1954	6,841	−0.33%
1962	7,368	+0.93%
1968	7,971	+1.32%
1975	8,130	+0.28%
1982	7,260	−1.60%
1990	6,596	−1.19%
1999	6,254	−0.59%
2007	6,552	+0.58%
2012	6,346	−0.64%
2017	6,383	+0.12%
2023	6,008	−1.00%

Source: EHESS and INSEE (1968–2023)

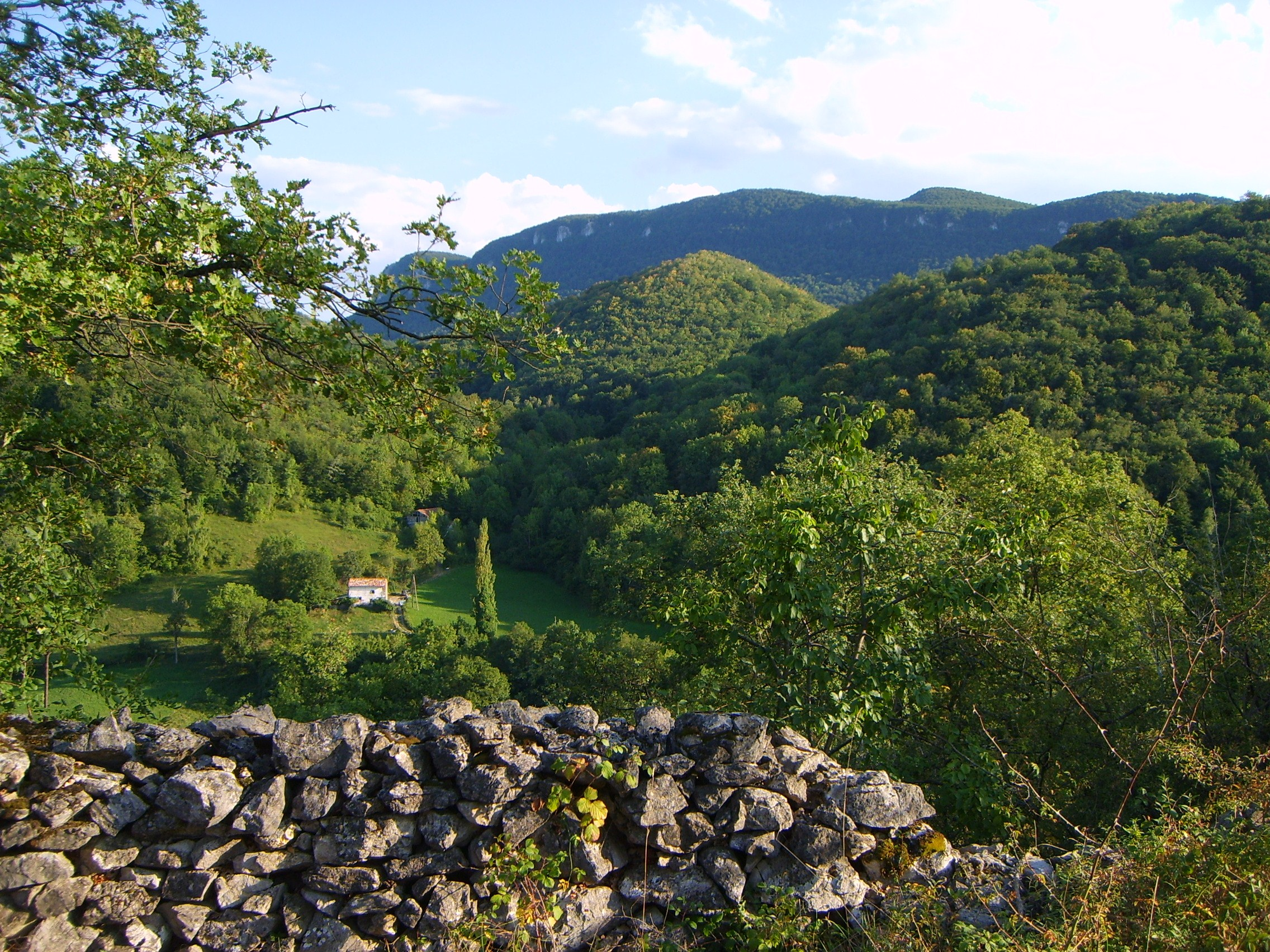
Countryside

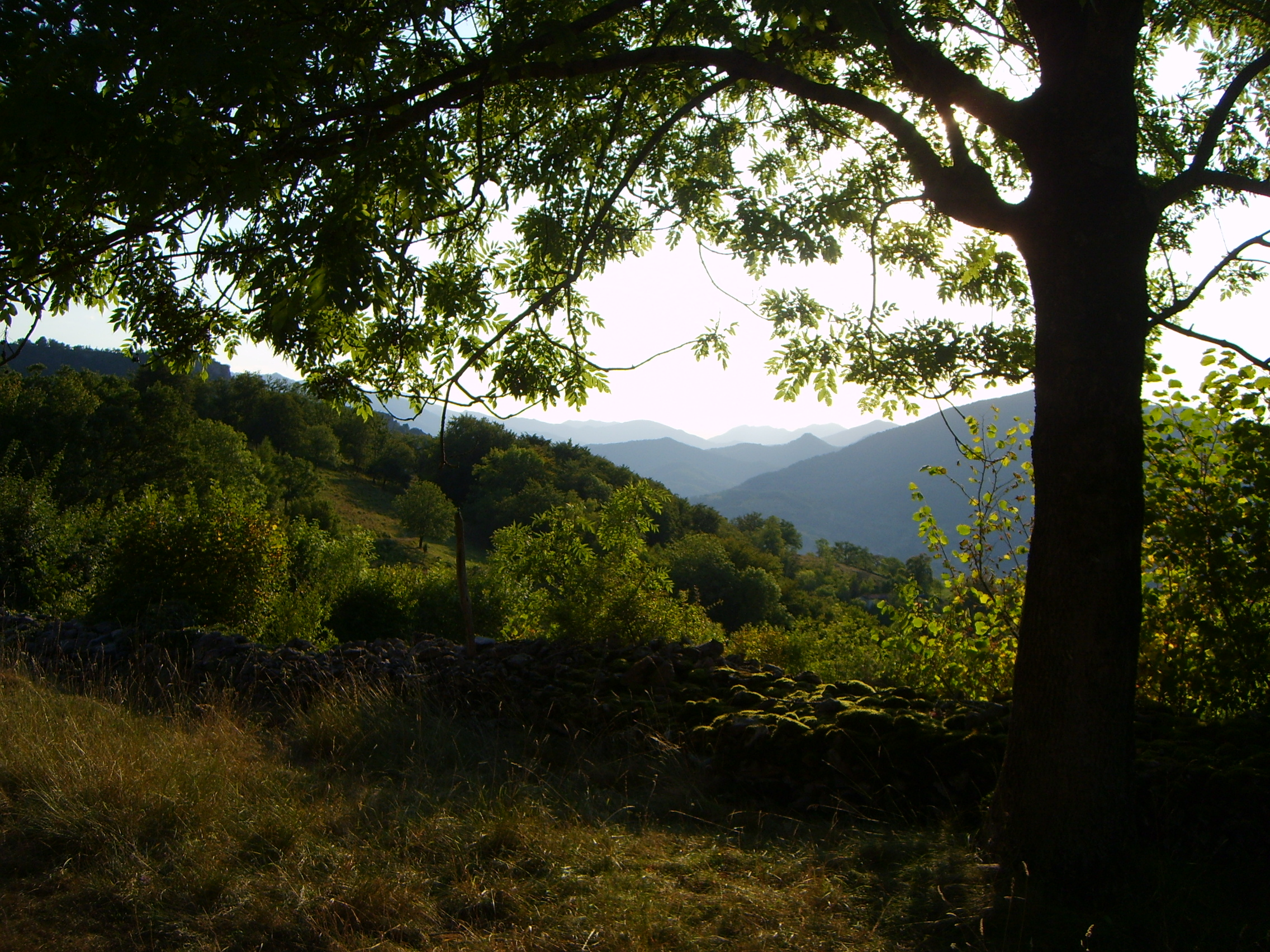
Countryside

== Memorials ==
Memorial to Oscar and Jean Auriac

A memorial to the 1939–1945 war, dedicated to Oscar Auriac and his son Jean Auriac, both burried in Saint-Girons, was unveiled on 25 June 1950. The monument was created by Patrice Bonnet and Carlo Sarrabezolles following a national fundraising campaign. An inscription reproduces part of Oscar Auriac’s speech delivered during the farewell ceremony before the students of the École Normale Supérieure in Saint-Cloud, in which he spoke of his son Jean, physician and member of the Resistance who Deid for France :

"I, too, shall no longer see the sun, but the luminous memory of my years at Saint-Cloud, combined with the clear image of a gentle proud son who became my role model because he knew how to master life, and who entered the darkness of death without fear."

== Sport ==
Stage 8 of the 2009 Tour de France finished in Saint-Girons, after travelling 176 km from Andorra la Vella.

Stage 9 of the 2013 Tour de France started here.
