= Bruno Rigutto =

French pianist, composer and conductor (born 1945)

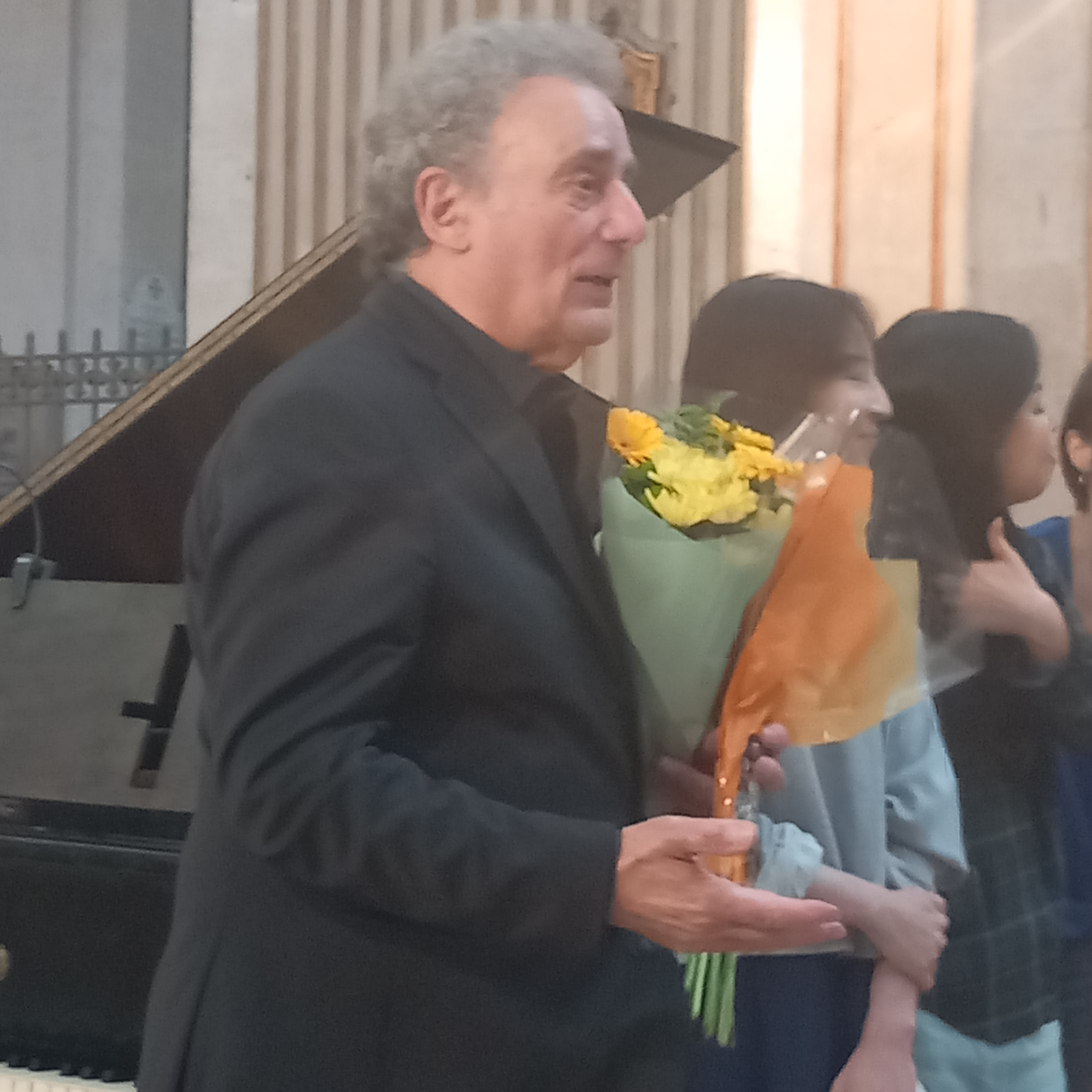
Bruno Rigutto

Bruno Rigutto (born 12 August 1945) is a French pianist, composer and conductor.

== Career ==
Born in Charenton-le-Pont, Rigutto studied at the Conservatoire de Paris where he was a student of Samson François and Paul Badura-Skoda. In 1965 he was a laureate of the Long-Thibaud-Crespin Competition and the International Tchaikovsky Competition in 1966. He has been teaching the piano at the Conservatoire de Paris since 1981. Rigutto composed the music for Nina Companéez's feature film Faustine et le Bel Été in 1972.

== Selected discography ==
- Piano Recital: Chopin, Liszt, Schumann (Kinderszenen) 1969 Musiidisc, France.
- Chopin's Nocturnes, at Emi;
- Chopin's Piano Concerto No. 1 and No. 2, Budapest Philharmonic Orchestra, with Erich Bergel at Denon; Andante spianato et grande polonaise brillante Op. 22 at Decca/Aristrocrate;
- Chopin's 19 Waltzes, sleeve by Sempé at Frolane;
- Tchaikovsky's Piano Concerto No. 1 and Violin Concerto with Jean-Pierre Wallez, Monte-Carlo Philharmonic Orchestra, with Yuri Ahronovitch at IPG;
- Haydn's Keyboard Concerto No. 11 in D major - G Major at Decca;
- J-S Bach's Concertos for 1, 2, 3 and 4 pianos at Emi;
- Mozart's Piano Sonata No. 11;
- R. Schumann's Piano Concerto, Konzertstuck with the Orchestre National de France conducted by Kurt Masur at Aristocrate;
- Antonín Dvořák's Piano Concerto, Orchestre philharmonique de Radio France, Zdeněk Mácal at Decca, IPG, Peters;
