= Maisie Renault =

French Resistance fighter, deportee

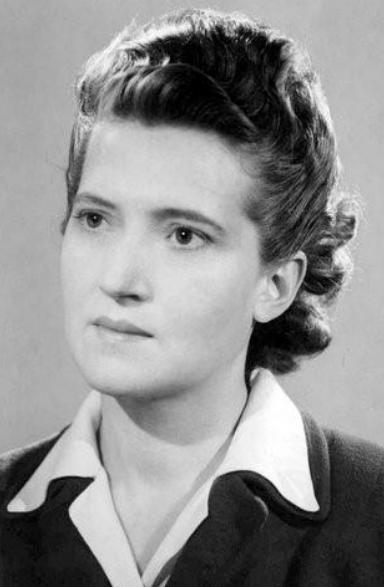
- Born: May Renault; 13 December 1907; Vannes, France
- Died: 7 April 2003 (aged 95); Vannes, France
- Known for: Memoir on deportation to concentration camp
- Relatives: Gilbert Renault

Maisie Renault (13 December 1907 – 7 April 2003) was a French Resistance fighter and a member of the Confrérie Notre-Dame network. She was arrested in 1942 and deported to the Ravensbrück concentration camp in 1944.

== Biography ==
Born May Renault in Vannes on 13 December 1907 she was better known as Maisie. Her father was Léon Renault, professor of philosophy and English and inspector general of an insurance company and her mother Marie Decker was daughter of composer Théodore Decker. Maisie Renault came from a family of ten. Her brother was Gilbert Renault, Colonel Rémy. The family was strongly resistance oriented. Her other siblings included Isabelle, born on 26 August 1923 and Philippe, born 29 March 1915, killed in Lübeck-Neustadt Bay, 3 May 1945, both members of the Confrérie Notre Dame-Castille network and both also deported.

In 1925, when her father died Renault gave up school to help her mother. She took a job at the Banque de France in Vannes. She spent a short time with her brother Gilbert in Gabon before returning home as the accountant for an agricultural cooperative. Gilbert founded an intelligence network in France called the Confrérie Notre-Dame. It was "considered to be the most important intelligence network in Free France". Renault joined in December 1940 and by the same time the following year she joined their Paris headquarters on rue Madame. Renault was responsible for sorting the information to go to London, prioritising it and transcribing the coded language and ensuring the radio operators had the details needed. The network was infiltrated and the first arrests began in June 1942. Renault was arrested on 13 June 1942 with her sister Madeleine Cestari. They managed to ensure their brothers escape. Renault gave away no information during her interrogation.

== Deportation ==
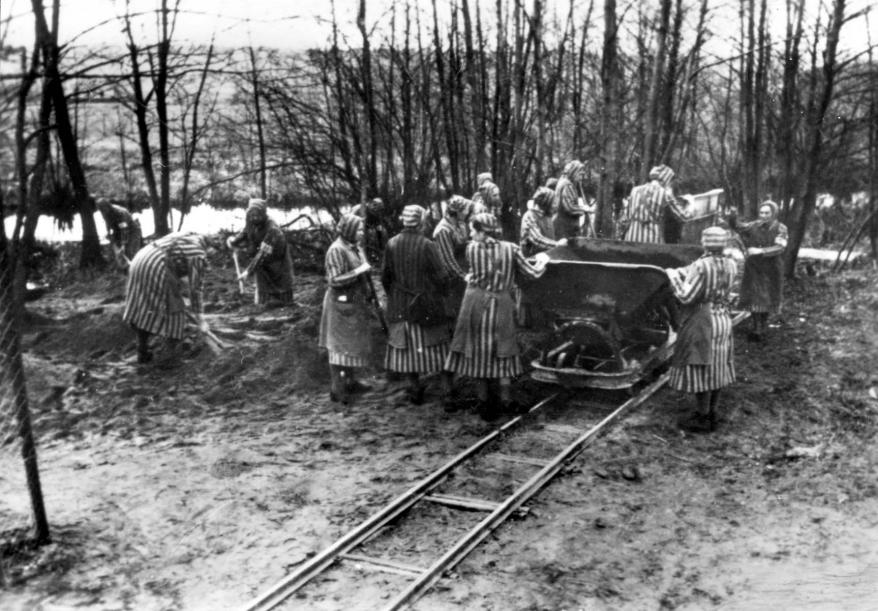
Renault was sent to Ravensbrück in August 1944. She later wrote a memoir, La Grande Misère, about the events.

Initially Renault was isolated and kept incommunicado in La Santé prison, then in Fresnes Prison until March 1943 before she was moved to Romainville and Compiègne. It was there she met Germaine Tillion's mother. In February 1944 she returned to Romainville. 15 August 1944, Renault was sent by train to the Ravensbrück camp. She arrived 21 August. Renault was one of only seventeen survivors of her group of 550 people. The camp was liberated on 22 April 1945. Renault and her sister were taken to Copenhagen and then on to Sweden. They were cared for by the Red Cross. They left Sweden in July 1945 and were brought back to Paris. They were reunited with their brother Gilbert there.

== Memoirs ==
As soon as Renault's health was stable and she had received all the necessary medical care, she began to write down her memories of the deportation. She asked her brother to edit it and rearrange it into chapters but he decided to leave it as she had written it. She completed it in August 1947 in Arradon and in 1948 it was published as La Grande Misère. The book became famous and received the Grand prix Vérité. Renault then returned home to Vannes in 1959, and went back to work in the cooperative, until her retirement. She never stopped testifying about what she experienced, especially in the schools of Morbihan. Renault died in Vannes in 2003.

== Awards ==
Renault received the Legion of Honor, the Croix de Guerre and the Resistance medal. In 2002, she was promoted to the rank of commander in the Legion of Honor.
