= Christine Lipinska =

French film director

- Born: 13 May 1951 (age 75); Algiers, France (now Algeria)
- Occupations: Film director Screenwriter
- Years active: 1976–1993

Christine Lipinska (born 13 May 1951) is a French film director and screenwriter.

== Filmography ==
- Je suis Pierre Rivière (1976)
- Folie suisse (1985)
- Papa est parti, maman aussi (1989)
- Le cahier volé (1993)

== See also ==
- List of female film and television directors
- List of LGBT-related films directed by women
