= Jacques Fansten =

French film director

- Born: 1946 (age 79–80); Paris, France
- Occupations: Film director, screenwriter, film producer
- Years active: 1970–present

Jacques Fansten (born 1946) is a French film director, screenwriter and producer. He has directed 20 films since 1970.

== Selected filmography ==
- Stadium Nuts (1972)
- Little Marcel (1976)
