= Audrey Tautou =

French actress (born 1976)

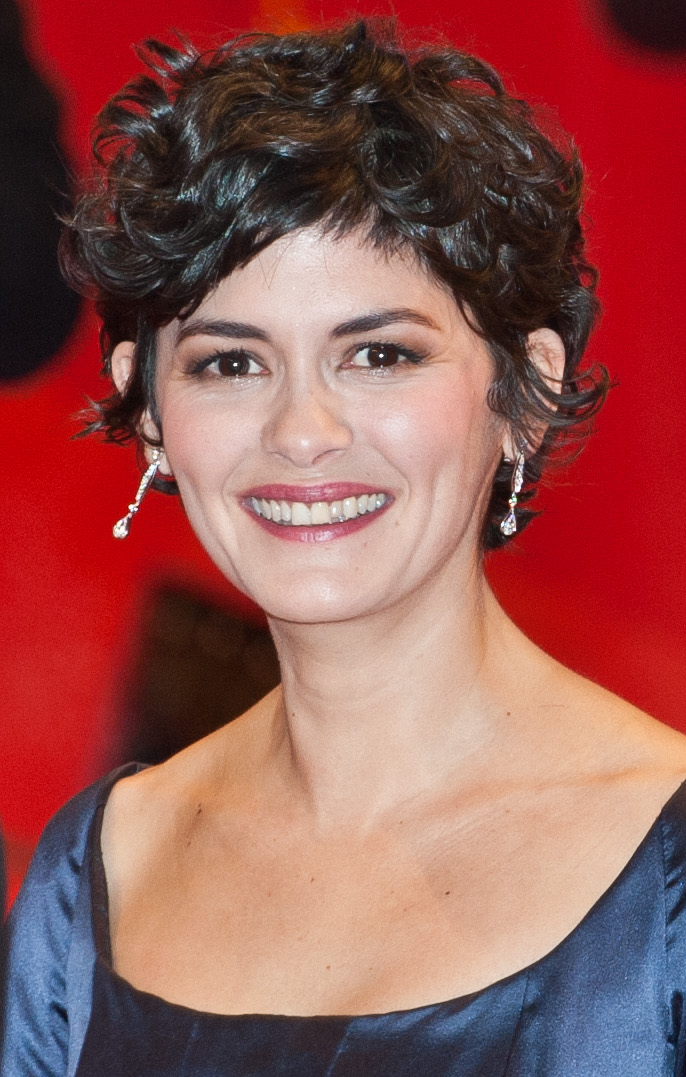
- Tautou in 2015
- Born: Audrey Justine Tautou; 9 August 1976 (age 50); Beaumont, Puy-de-Dôme, France
- Education: Catholic University of Paris
- Occupations: Actress, model
- Years active: 1996–present
- Children: 1

Audrey Justine Tautou (French: [odʁɛ ʒystin totu]; born 9 August 1976) is a French actress. She made her acting debut at age 18 on television, and her feature film debut in Venus Beauty Institute (1999), for which she received critical acclaim and won the César Award for Most Promising Actress.

Tautou achieved international recognition for her lead role in the 2001 film Amélie, which was critically acclaimed and a major box-office success. She has since appeared in films in a range of genres, including the thrillers Dirty Pretty Things (2002) and The Da Vinci Code (2006), and the romantic comedy Priceless (2006). She was acclaimed for her role in the World War I drama A Very Long Engagement (2004), and for her portrayal of French fashion designer Coco Chanel in the biographical drama Coco Before Chanel (2009). She has been nominated three times for the César Award and twice for the BAFTA for Best Actress in a leading role. In 2004, she was invited to join the Academy of Motion Picture Arts and Sciences (AMPAS).

Tautou has modeled for Chanel, Montblanc, L'Oréal and many other companies.

== Early life ==
Audrey Justine Tautou was born on 9 August 1976 in Beaumont, Puy-de-Dôme, and raised in Montluçon, a commune in central France. (Note: Age sources: "Audrey Tautou". Encyclopædia Britannica. "born Aug. 9, 1976, Beaumont, Auvergne, France"; Willsher, Kim (14 April 2013). "Audrey Tautou: how the French learned to love the star of Amélie". The Observer. "Born August 1976. Her father was a dental surgeon, her mother a teacher. She was raised in Montluçon, a town in central France."; "A propos de quelques ÉLÈVES CÉLÈBRES..." [About some famous students...]. Collège Jules Ferry Montlucon. Archived from the original on 30 October 2004. "née en 1976, élève de 1987 à 1991 [translation: born in 1976, a student from 1987 to 1991]"; Kangasniemi, Sanna (25 October 2013). "Ainaisesti ujo pariisitar". Helsingin Sanomat (in Finnish). No. Friday supplement Nyt. Helsinki. pp. 10–11. Archived from the original on 28 October 2013. "Sitten hän vastaa. Syntymävuosi on 1976. 'Mutta pitäisin parempana, jos kirjoittaisitte 1978. Voisitteko kirjoittaa 1978? Kerron teille totuuden ja pyydän teitä valehtelemaan.' [Then she replies. The birth year is 1976. 'But I would prefer if you wrote 1978. Could you write 1978? I tell you the truth, and ask you to lie'].") Her father, Bernard Tautou, is a dental surgeon, and her mother Eveline Marie Laure (née Nuret) is a teacher. She was named after actress Audrey Hepburn. She has one brother and two sisters. She showed an interest in acting at an early age and started her acting lessons at the Cours Florent, where she learned English and Italian.

== Acting career ==
=== 1990s ===
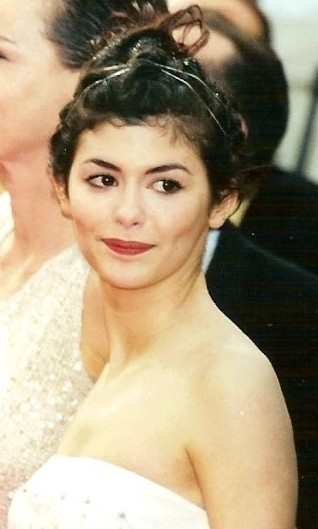
Tautou at the 1999 Cannes Film Festival

In 1998, Tautou participated in "Jeunes Premiers" (The Young Debuts), a Star Search-like competition sponsored by Canal+, and won Best Young Actress at the 9th Béziers Festival of Young Actors. Tonie Marshall gave Tautou a role in her 1999 César-winning film Venus Beauty Institute (also known as Vénus beauté (institut)). In 2000, Tautou received the Prix Suzanne Bianchetti as her country's most promising young film actress.

=== 2000s ===
In 2001, Tautou rose to international fame for her performance as the eccentric lead in the romantic comedy Amélie (original French title: Le Fabuleux Destin d'Amélie Poulain; English: The Fabulous Destiny of Amélie Poulain), a film directed by Jean-Pierre Jeunet. Written by Jeunet with Guillaume Laurant, it is a whimsical depiction of contemporary Parisian life, set in Montmartre, and tells the story of a shy waitress who decides to improve the lives of those around her while struggling with her own isolation. It was an international co-production between companies in France and Germany.

Amélie won Best Film at the European Film Awards; it won four César Awards (including Best Film and Best Director), two BAFTA Awards (including Best Original Screenplay), and was nominated for five Academy Awards. Grossing over $33 million in limited theatrical release, it is still the highest-grossing French-language film released in the United States.

In 2002, Tautou appeared in the British thriller film Dirty Pretty Things directed by Stephen Frears and written by Steven Knight, a drama about two illegal immigrants in London. Produced by BBC Films and Celador Films, it was nominated for an Academy Award for Best Original Screenplay and won the 2003 British Independent Film Award for Best Independent British Film.

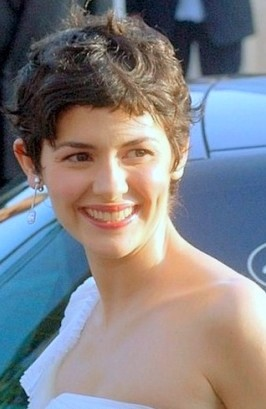
Tautou at the 2006 Cannes Film Festival.

In 2004, Tautou starred in A Very Long Engagement, a romantic war film co-written and directed by Jean-Pierre Jeunet. It is a fictional tale about a young woman's desperate search for her fiancé who might have been killed in the Battle of the Somme during World War I. It was based on the 1991 novel of the same name by Sebastien Japrisot. In June, Tautou was invited to join the Academy of Motion Picture Arts and Sciences (AMPAS).

In 2005, Tautou starred in her first full Hollywood production, opposite Tom Hanks, in the film version of Dan Brown's best-selling novel The Da Vinci Code, directed by Ron Howard and released in May 2006.

She starred alongside Gad Elmaleh in Pierre Salvadori's Hors de prix (Priceless), released 13 December 2006. It has been compared to Breakfast at Tiffany's.

Tautou starred with Guillaume Canet in Claude Berri's Hunting and Gathering (Ensemble, c'est tout) in 2007, an adaptation of the eponymous novel by Anna Gavalda.

=== 2010s–present ===
Tautou played the lead role in the biopic of fashion designer Coco Chanel, titled Coco Before Chanel, and directed by Anne Fontaine. Filming began in Paris in September 2008, and the film was released in France on 22 April 2009. The script is partially based on Edmonde Charles-Roux's book "L'Irrégulière" ("The Non-Conformist"). Instead of releasing Coco Before Chanel in the United States itself, Warner Bros. let Sony Pictures Classics handle the release there. The film grossed $6 million in the United States.

Coco Before Chanel was nominated for four BAFTA Awards, three European Film Awards, six César Awards and the Academy Award for Best Costume Design.

In 2011, she appeared in Delicacy, a French romantic comedy-drama directed by David and Stéphane Foenkinos and based on the novel of the same name by David Foenkinos. David was nominated for the 2012 Best Adaptation César Award and the film was nominated as Best Film.

She appeared in the music video of "I Love Your Smile", a song by British singer-songwriter Charlie Winston.

She was the host of the opening and closing ceremonies of the 2013 Cannes Film Festival.

She was a member of the jury of the 2015 Berlin Film Festival. She appeared in the 2016 film The Odyssey as Simone Melchior Cousteau.

== Public image and modelling career ==
Tautou began modelling at a young age, taking modelling courses and other activities, and has modelled for magazines such as Vogue, Elle, Harper's Bazaar, Marie Claire in many countries.

Tautou was named in 2009 as the next spokesmodel for Chanel No. 5, replacing Nicole Kidman. She was directed in the advertisement by Jean-Pierre Jeunet, with whom she worked on Amélie and A Very Long Engagement. The advertisement was released in 2009 to coincide with release of Coco before Chanel. She has also become the face of L'Oréal and Montblanc and several other ad campaigns.

Tautou over the years has been declared a fashionista and icon by the press, appearing in many magazines, fashion, beauty, and culture. She has attended major fashion week events around the world as well as smaller events. The press sometimes refers to her as "The Chanel Muse".

== Personal life ==
Tautou studied at the Catholic University of Paris. A churchgoer when young, she has stated that she is "not officially" Catholic.

Tautou was in a relationship with French singer Matthieu Chedid from 2007 to 2008. She was in a relationship with Yann Le Bourbouac'h, the marketing director of French film studio Gaumont, from 2016 to 2019.

Tautou struggled with her sudden fame after Amélie (2001) and disliked being in the spotlight. She also turned down roles in Hollywood after The Da Vinci Code (2006) because she thought her English was not good and she did not feel as free as she did when she was acting in French; it was also difficult to get good roles as a foreign actress and she could not handle the international exposure that a Hollywood film would bring her and preferred to remain discreet. Tautou told The i Paper in 2017 about not wanting a career in Hollywood; "It's very difficult to get great parts: first as a female actress; second as a foreign actress; and now as an actress over 40. But that's fine. I don't need – and I don't want – to make a career there. When nice things come, I'm happy to do them. But I'm not going to run after anybody."

Tautou said she considers France her base, where she focused her career, rather than in the United States. In 2006, she told Stevie Wong of The Straits Times, "I am, at the end of the day, a French actress. I am not saying I will never shoot an English-language movie again, but my home, my community, my career is rooted in France. I would never move to Los Angeles."

In 2019, Tautou adopted her daughter from Vietnam.

== Filmography ==
=== Film ===
Year	Title	Role	Notes
1999	Venus Beauty Institute	Marie	Cabourg Film Festival Award for Female Revelation; César Award for Most Promising Actress; Lumière Award for Most Promising Actress; SACD Award for Best Actress
1999	Triste à mourir	Caro	Short film
2000	Épouse-moi	Marie-Ange	
2000	Pretty Devils	Anne-Sophie	Original title: Voyou, voyelles
2000	Le Libertin	Julie d'Holbach	
2000	Happenstance	Irène	Original title: Le Battement d'ailes du papillon
2001	Amélie	Amélie Poulain	Chicago Film Critics Association Award for Most Promising Performer; Lumière Award for Best Actress; Sant Jordi Award for Best Actress; Nominated – Audience award for Best Actress; Nominated – BAFTA Award for Best Actress in a Leading Role; Nominated – César Award for Best Actress; Nominated – Empire Award for Best Actress; Nominated – European Film Award for Best Actress; Nominated – Satellite Award for Best Actress; Nominated – Phoenix Film Critics Society for Best Actress; Nominated – Phoenix Film Critics Society for Best Newcomer; Nominated – Online Film Critics Society for Best Actress; Nominated – Vancouver Film Critics Circle for Best Actress
2001	God Is Great and I'm Not	Michèle	Original title: Dieu est grand, je suis toute petite
2002	He Loves Me... He Loves Me Not	Angélique	Original title: À la folie... pas du tout
2002	L'Auberge espagnole	Martine	Other titles: The Spanish Apartment and Pot Luck
2002	Dirty Pretty Things	Senay Gelik	Nominated – European Film Award People's Choice Award for Best Actress
2003	Les Marins perdus	Lalla	
2003	Not on the Lips	Huguette Verberie	Original title: Pas sur la bouche
2003	Happy End	Val Chipzik	
2004	A Very Long Engagement	Mathilde	Nominated – César Award for Best Actress; Nominated – European Film Award for Best Actress; Nominated – European Film Award People's Choice Award for Best Actress
2005	Russian Dolls	Martine	Original title: Les Poupées russes
2006	The Da Vinci Code	Sophie Neveu	
2006	Priceless	Irène	NRJ Ciné Award (shared with Gad Elmaleh) for Best Kiss
2007	Hunting and Gathering	Camille Fauque	Original title: Ensemble, c'est tout
2009	Coco Before Chanel	Gabrielle 'Coco' Chanel	Nominated – BAFTA Award for Best Actress in a Leading Role; Nominated – César Award for Best Actress; Nominated – Lumière Award for Best Actress
2010	Beautiful Lies	Emilie Dandrieux	Original title: De vrais mensonges
2011	Delicacy	Nathalie Kerr	Original title: La délicatesse
2012	Headwinds	Sarah Anderen	
2012	Thérèse Desqueyroux	Thérèse Desqueyroux	
2013	Mood Indigo	Chloé	Original title: L'Écume des jours
2013	Chinese Puzzle	Martine	Original title: Casse-tête chinois
2015	Microbe & Gasoline	Marie-Thérèse Guéret	Original title: Microbe et Gasoil
2015	Eternity	Valentine	
2016	The Odyssey	Simone Melchior	Nominated – Globes de Cristal Award for Best Actress
2016	Open at Night	Nawel	
2017	Santa & Cie	Wanda Claus	
2018
2018	The Trouble With You	Agnès	Nominated – César Award for Best Supporting Actress
2019	The Jesus Rolls	Marie	
2023	Nina et le secret du hérisson	Camille (voice)	

=== Television ===
Year	Title	Role	Notes
1996	Cœur de cible		TV movie
1997	La Vérité est un vilain défaut	The telephone operator	TV movie
1997	Les Cordier, juge et flic	Léa	TV movie, episode: "Le Crime d'à côté"
1998	La Vieille Barrière	A girl in the district	TV movie
1998	Bébés boum	Elsa	TV movie
1998	Chaos technique	Lisa	TV movie
1998	Julie Lescaut	Tracy	TV movie, episode: "Bal masqué"
1999	Le Boiteux	Blandine Piancet	TV movie, episode: "Baby blues"

=== Theatre ===
Year	Show	Role	Notes
2010	A Doll's House	Nora	Théâtre de la Madeleine
2011	A Doll's House	Nora	Tour

== National honours ==
- Commandeur de l'Ordre des Arts et des Lettres (2018)
