= Gilbert Renault =

French resistance member

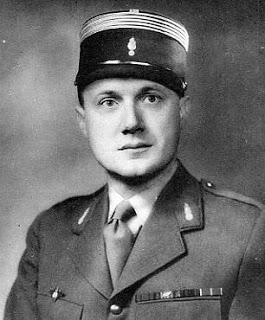
Gilbert Renault

Gilbert Renault (6 August 1904 – 29 July 1984), known by the nom de guerre Colonel Rémy, was a notable French secret agent active during the Second World War and was known under various pseudonyms such as Raymond, Jean-Luc, Morin, Watteau, Roulier, Beauce and Rémy.

== Biography ==
Gilbert Renault was born in Vannes, France, the oldest child of a Catholic family of nine children. His father was a professor of Philosophy and English, and later the inspector general of an insurance company. He went to the Collège St-François-Xavier in Vannes, and after his studies he went to the Rennes faculty. His sisters were Maisie Renault and Madeleine Cestari.

A sympathizer of Action Française in the Catholic and chauvanist line, he began his career at the Bank of France in 1924. In 1936, he began cinematic production and finances, and made J'accuse, a new version of the Abel Gance film. It was a resounding failure, but the many connections that Renault made during this period were very useful during the Resistance.

With the armistice declared of June 18, 1940, he refused to accept Marshal Philippe Pétain and went to London with one of his brothers on board a trawler which departed from Lorient. He was one of the first men to adhere to the calls of General Charles de Gaulle and was entrusted by Colonel Passy, the captain and chief of the Bureau Central de Renseignements et d'Action, to create an information network in France.

In August of that year, he met with Louis de La Bardonnie, and together, they created the Notre-Dame Brotherhood, which would become NDT-Castille in 1944. Initially centred on the Atlantic coast, it ended up covering much of occupied France and Belgium. The network was one of the most important in the occupied zone, and its information allowed many military successes, as the attack on Bruneval and on Saint-Nazaire.

Convinced that it was necessary to mobilize all forces against the occupation, he put the French Communist Party in touch with the exiled government of Free France in January 1943. Renault later admitted it was Pierre Brossolette who had put him in touch with political groups and trade unions.

Awarded the Ordre de la Libération on March 13, 1942, he became a member of the executive committee of the Rally of the French People (RPF) from its creation in charge of trips and demonstrations. He appeared in Carrefour on April 11, 1950 in an article, 'La justice et l'opprobre' (Justice and the Opprobrium), in which he preached the rehabilitation of Marshal Pétain. A short time later, he adhered to the Association in Defence of the Memory of Marshal Pétain (ADMP). Repudiated by de Gaulle, he resigned from the RPF.

He settled in Portugal in 1954 but returned to France in 1958 to be placed at the disposal of de Gaulle. Renault also became very active onwards in various associations including ultra-conservative Catholic networks.

He died in Guingamp, France, in 1984.

Renault wrote many works on his activities in the Resistance. Under the name of Rémy (one of his pseudonyms in clandestinity), he published his Mémoires d'un agent secret de la France libre et La Ligne de démarcation. It was adapted to film as [Line of Demarcation by Claude Chabrol in 1966, and they are regarded as important testimonies on the French Resistance.

He had the writer Jean Cayrol under his orders.

== Decorations ==
- Commandeur de la Légion d'honneur
- Compagnon de la Libération - décret du 13 mars 1942
- Croix de Guerre 1939-1945
- Médaille de la Résistance avec rosette
- Distinguished Service Order (G.B.)
- Officer of the Order of the British Empire (G.B.)
- Officer of the Legion of Merit (U.S.)
- Officier de la Couronne de Belgique
- Croix de Guerre Belge
- Commandeur du Mérite (Luxembourg)

== Homage ==
Around 1993, a street in Caen, France, was named after Colonel Rémy in a district close to the Mémorial pour la Paix Museum that has most of its streets honour personalities linked with the Second World War, the Resistance and the subsequent forming of the European Economic Community, which became the European Union.

== Portrayed in film and television ==
- Le Grand Charles - French television - portrayed by French actor Sam Spiegel.

== Bibliography ==
- 1946–1950: Mémoires d'un agent secret de la France libre, Raoul Solar
  - Volume 1, Mémoires d'un agent secret de la France libre (juin 1940-juin 1942)
  - Volume 2, Le livre du courage et de la peur T.1 (juin 1942-novembre 1943)
  - Volume 3, Le livre du courage et de la peur T.2 (juin 1942-novembre 1943)
  - Volume 4, Comment meut un réseau (novembre 1943-août 1944)
  - Volume 5, Une affaire de trahison
  - Volume 6, Les mains jointes (1944)
  - Volume 7, …Mais le temple est bâti (1944-1945)
- (Reorganized in the posterior editions):
  - Volume 1, Le Refus
  - Volume 2, Les Soldats du silence
  - Volume 3, La Délivrance)
- 1947: De Gaulle cet inconnu, Raoul Solar
- 1948: La Nuit des oliviers, Raoul Solar
- 1949: Le Monument, Fayard
- 1949: Nous sommes ainsi faits, Chavane
- 1950: La Justice et l'opprobre, suivi d'une note sur l'intolérance, Éditions du Rocher
- 1951: On m'appelait Rémy, Plon
- 1952: Réseaux d'ombre, Éditions France-Empire
- 1952: Le Messie, Editions du Rocher
- 1953: Profil d'un espion, Plon
- 1953: Pourpre des martyrs, Fayard
- 1953: Un architecte de Dieu, le père François Pallu, Fayard
- 1953: Œuvres libres, Fayard
- 1954: Leur calvaire, Fayard
- 1954: Passeurs clandestins, Fayard
- 1954: L'Opération "Jéricho", Éditions France-Empire
- 1955: Goa, Rome de l'Orient, Éditions France-Empire
- 1956: Les Caravelles du Christ, Plon
- 1956: Les Mains revêtues de lumière, Plon
- 1957: Fatima, espérance du Monde, Plon
- 1957: Portugal, Hachette
- 1959: Dix marches vers l'Espoir, Presses de la Cité
- 1960: De sang et de chair, Le livre contemporain
- 1960: Le monocle noir, Hachette
- 1961: Le Joueur de flute, Presses de la Cité
- 1961: Catéchisme de la patrie, Éditions France-Empire
- 1961: J.A. épisodes de la vie d'un agent du S.R. et du contre-espionnage français, Galic (J.A. sont les initiales de Jacques Abtey)
- 1962: Le Monocle passe et gagne, Hachette
- 1962: Les Balcons de Tulle, Librairie académique Perrin
- 1963: La grande prière de Chartres, Dimanche 29 Septembre 1963, Histoire du pèlerinage national pour la réconciliation dans la justice et la compréhension mutuelle, France-empire
- 1963: La Dernière carte, Presses de la cité
- 1963: Comment devenir agent secret, Albin Michel
- 1964: Compagnons de l'Honneur, France-Empire, Paris
- 1964 - 1976: La Ligne de démarcation, Librairie académique Perrin (21 volumes)
- 1967: Réseau Comète, Librairie académique Perrin
- 1968: Bruneval, Opération coup de croc, France-Empire
- 1968: Le Déjeuner de la croix de Vernuche, Librairie académique Perrin
- 1968: La Maison d'Alphonse, Perrin, 1968
- 1969: Autour de la plage Bonaparte, suite de «la Maison d'Alphonse, Perrin
- 1969: Le Pianiste, Éditions France-Empire
- 1969: Et l'Angleterre sera détruite, Éditions France-Empire
- 1971: Dans l'ombre du maréchal, Presses de la cité
- 1971: Dix ans avec de Gaulle, 1940 - 1950, Éditions France-Empire, Paris
- 1972: Avec l'oflag VIII F, Presses de la Cité
- 1973: Le Schloss ou l'évadé malgré lui, Éditions France-Empire
- 1974: Avec les Ch'timis : en souvenir du réseau Sylvestre Farmer, ex W.O., France-Empire
- 1974: Mission Marathon, Librairie académique Perrin
- 1974: Trente ans après - 6 Juin 1944 / 6 Juin 1974, Librairie Académique Perrin
- 1974 - 1975: Les Français dans la Résistance, Famot (29 Volumes : En Lorraine, En Provence, En Bretagne, A Paris et dans la Région Parisienne, En Aquitaine, En Auvergne, Limousin, Berry, En Champagne Ardennes, En Languedoc Roussillon, En Alsace et Vosges, Dans le Nord, Dans le Lyonnais, En Normandie, En Dauphiné Savoie, En Corse, T. 2, En Anjou, Touraine, Orléanais, T. 1, En Bourgogne Franche-Comté, T. 1...)
- 1975: Missions secrètes, Famot
- 1975: Morhange. Les chasseurs de traites, Flammarion
- 1976: Le 18^{e} jour : la tragédie de Léopold III, Roi des Belges, France-Empire
- 1976: Combats dans l'ombre, Idégraf
- 1978: Rognes et grognes du Général - 1940-1944, Versoix
- 1979: Histoire du débarquement, Vernoy
- 1979: Secrets et réussites de l'espionnage français, Famot
- 1979: Une épopée de la Résistance : en France, en Belgique et au Grand Duché du Luxembourg, Paris
- 1979: La Résistance a commencé le 3 septembre 1939, Plon
- 1979 - 1983: Chronique d'une guerre perdue, France-empire
  - Volume 1, L'Entre-Deux-Guerre
  - Volume 2, Le 10 Mai 1940
  - Volume 3, Sedan
  - Volume 4, De la Norvège aux Flandres
  - Volume 5, La Bataille de France
  - Volume 6, Fors l'Honneur
- 1981: De sang et de chair, Édito-service
- 1981: Combattre jusqu'au bout, Plon
- 1981: La résistance en France 1940-1945, Collet
- 1982: Mes grands hommes et quelques autres, Grasset
- 1984: La Résistance à vingt ans, Ouest France
- 1984: La Seconde guerre mondiale : la Résistance, Éd. Christophe Colomb
- 1986: La Résistance, Hatier

== Sources ==
(Mostly translated from the French article on Gilbert Renault)

- Grandmaison (Henri de), Le colonel Rémy, un héros de l'ombre, CMD, 2000.
- Perrier (Guy), Rémy - L'agent secret n° 1 de la France libre, Perrin, 2001.
