= Sam Spiegel (actor) =

French actor

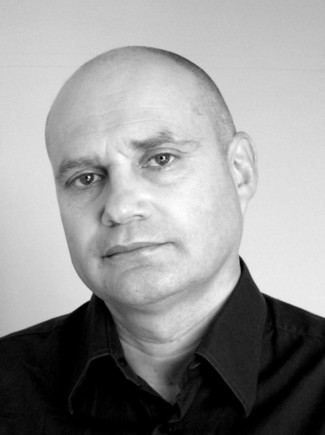
- Born: Sam Hervé Spiegel; Metz, France
- Education: Actors Studio
- Occupation: Actor
- Years active: 1986-present
- Website: samspiegel.com

Sam Hervé Spiegel is a French actor. He has appeared in both French and English language films, television series and plays. Also a voice-over artist and a writer of novels and children's books, Spiegel lives currently in England.

== Biography ==
Spiegel was born in Metz, Moselle, France. He studied fine art at the Ecole des Beaux Arts in Metz before moving to London, UK. He studied acting in London with Philippe Gaulier, Tony Greco (Actors Studio) in New York, and comedy with Michel Galabru in Paris.

== Career ==
Spiegel has worked on many occasions for the BBC and portrayed various characters such as ministers, politicians, doctors, gangsters, cops, scientists in series like Roger Roger II, Schubert (as Schubert), Bonekickers and more recently portrayed French Foreign Minister Christian Pineau in The Crown for Netflix. Spiegel has acted in a variety of series for Channel 4 (The Queen's Sister) and ITV (Wing and a Prayer, Hale and Pace) or for France 2 (Le Grand Charles). He also worked for the cinema in France and in the UK with film directors such as Jean-Pierre Mocky, Roger Goldby, and on stage in various plays. His extensive voice-over work includes voices for Henri Matisse, Charles Baudelaire, voices for TV and radio commercials and corporate projects.

=== Filmography ===
- The Crown, 2017, as Christian Pineau, Netflix, directed by Philip Martin
- The Time of Their Lives, 2017, as The Hotel Manager, directed by Roger Goldby
- Two Timing Terror, (TV series 50 Ways to Kill Your Lover), as Marcel Dupré, directed by Nick Tebbet
- Fermata, Koiz Productions, 2015, as Matiere Gris, directed by Ashkan Kooshanejad
- The Honourable Rebel, THR The Film Ltd, 2015, as French Border Guard, directed by Mike Fraser
- Les Sept de l'Ermitage, Ellipse Productions, 2013, as Octave César, with Michel Galabru, directed by Annie Corbier
- The betrayal of Paul Cézanne, Sunnyside Productions, 2012, as Émile Zola & The card player
- Emulsion, White Lantern Film, 2012, as Professor Pierre Vallade (Psychiatrist & hypnotherapist)
- Pigalle, la nuit, (2009) Lincoln TV, as Nadir's banker (Simon Abkarian), directed by Hervé Hadmar
- Bonekickers, BBC TV, as Henri, French foreman (1 episode, The Lines of War, 2008)
- Le Grand Charles (2006) (TV, France) as Gilbert Renault, a.k.a. Colonel Remy
- The Queen's Sister (2005) (TV) as Professor Pierre Lavalle
- Le Furet, Cinema (2003), directed by Jean-Pierre Mocky, as Angel (gangster)
- Ca va se savoir (2002) TV, (Sam Herve Spiegel) as Jean Francois – Entrepreneur
- Largo Winch, TV, as Head technician (1 episode, Nuclear Family, 2001)
- Josephine, ange gardien, TV, France, as Simon – Entrepreneur (1 episode, Romain et Jamila, 2001)
- Wing and a Prayer, TV, Paul, as Denise's Pim (1 episode, 1999)
- Secret D-Day, (1998) (USA, TV), as Juan Pujol, double agent
- Hale and Pace, ITV, TV, in Various Characters (4 episodes, 1998)
- Roger Roger (1996) (TV), as Monsieur Pierre
- Madonna: The Video Collection 93:99 (1999) (V) as a Record producer (in "Drowned World/Substitute for Love" music video)

=== Stage ===
- Country Cooking from Central France: Roast Boned Rolled Stuffed Shoulder of Lamb (Farce Double), 2013, as the French chef, by Harry Mathews
- Night of January 16th, 2008, Detective Elmer Sweeney
- Gipsy Suitcases, (Voyageurs sans voyage), 2004, as Lucas, a.k.a. Pepe Milano
- Mary Stuart, Friedrich Schiller, 2002, as Lord William Davison
- Afraid to Fight, (La peur des coups), Courteline, 2001, Lui (the Husband), directed by Michel Galabru
- Lethal Romance, 2001, as American republican Governor Robert T. Tool
- The roaring thirties, 2001, as Seul, the father
- The Secret of Schouane, 2001, parts: Ali, Poter, Taylor, Grocer, The King

=== Video games ===
- Voice of super-villain The Ghost in the French version of the Video game Iron Man 2 (Marvel Comics)
- Voice of super-villain Arnim Zola in the French version of the Video game Captain America: Super Soldier (Marvel Comics)
- Voice of "The Boss" in the French version of the PlayStation game Driver 2.
- Voice of Commander Klaus Zimmermann in the French version of the computer game Dark Omen (Warhammer Fantasy)
