= Gad Elmaleh =

Moroccan-Canadian comedian and actor (born 1971)

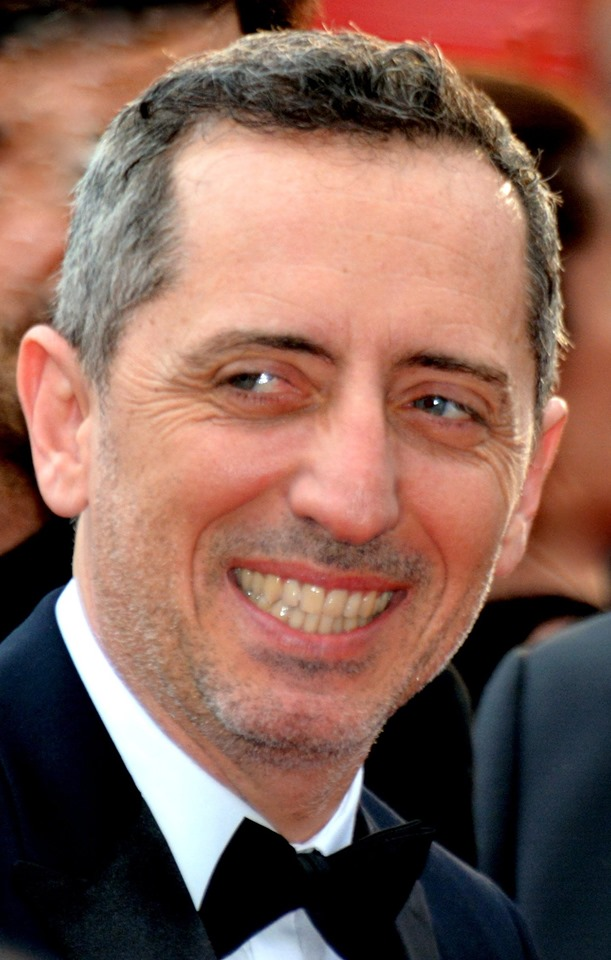
- Elmaleh at 2019 Cannes Film Festival
- Born: 19 April 1971 (age 55); Casablanca, Morocco
- Occupations: Actor, comedian, screenwriter, director
- Years active: 1994–present
- Partner(s): Anne Brochet (1998–2002); Charlotte Casiraghi (2011–2015)
- Children: 2
- Website: gadelmaleh.com

Gad Elmaleh (Arabic: جاد المالح, Gād el-Māleḥ; Berber languages: ⴳⴰⴷ ⵍⵎⴰⵍⵃ; born 19 April 1971) is a Moroccan-Canadian stand-up comedian, actor, screenwriter and director. Best known in the French-speaking world and English-speaking world, he has notably achieved fame in France, Morocco, and the United States.

He has starred in several feature films, including Coco, Priceless, La Doublure and Midnight in Paris. Voted the funniest person in France, he was named knight of the Order of Arts and Letters by the Minister of Culture; he was also named knight of the National Order of Quebec. In 2015 and 2018, Elmaleh did national comedy tours across the United States. In 2019, he starred in the Netflix series Huge in France.

== Early years ==
Elmaleh was born and raised in Casablanca to a Moroccan Sephardic Jewish family. He was brought up in a culturally diverse environment, speaking Moroccan Arabic and French. As a child he would introduce his father, a mime, with a placard. His brother, Arié, is an actor and singer, and his sister, Judith, is an actress and stage director.

He studied at École Maïmonide, and Lycée Lyautey in Casablanca. His family emigrated from Morocco to Canada when Elmaleh was 17. He later studied political science in Montreal at the University of Montreal and McGill University for four years but did not graduate. In 1992, Elmaleh moved to Paris to study drama at Cours Florent under the tutelage of Isabelle Nanty.

== Career ==
=== Comedy ===
Elmaleh's first one-man show Décalages, performed at the "Palais des glaces" in 1997, was autobiographical. In the show he retraces his journey beginning with his departure from Morocco after high school, continuing with his studies in Montreal and finishing in France where he studied drama at Cours Florent. His fame further increased with the success of his second one-man show, La Vie Normale which was his first time performing at the Olympia as well his first show of more than two hours. The show was released on DVD on 23 January 2001.

In contrast to his first two one-man shows, his L'autre c'est moi (2005) contains more improvisation and interaction with the public. He has been credited with bringing the American stand-up style to France and using it in his one-man shows. He came back to the stage with L'autre, c'est moi in September 2006 in Canada (Montreal) and in the US (on Broadway, at the Beacon Theatre in front of 3000 spectators); it was performed also in Casablanca, Morocco. Between April and August 2007 he played his successful show in France, Belgium, and Switzerland. The show attracted over 300,000 spectators. The show was later released on DVD and sold 1,500,000 copies.

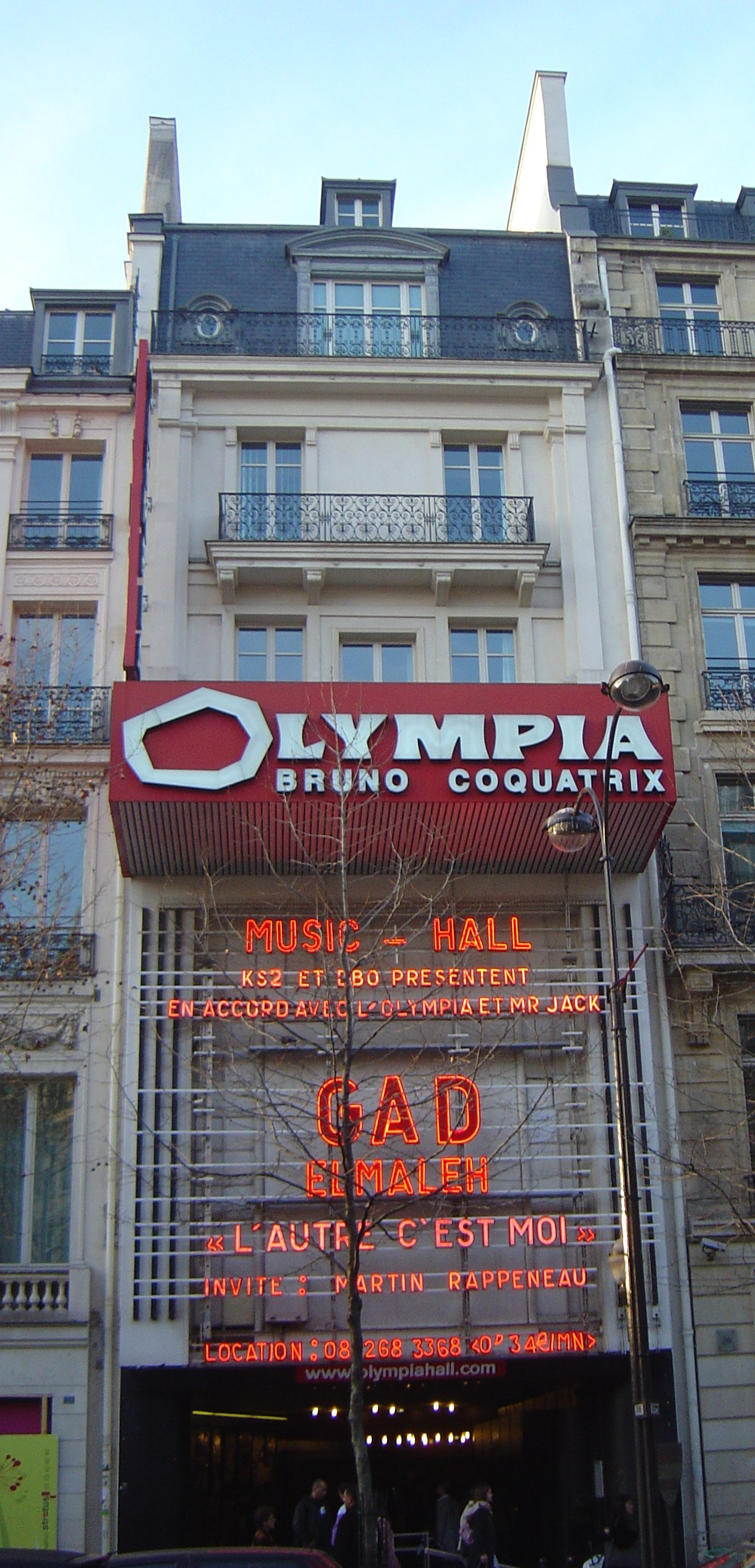
At the Olympia

On 6 January 2007, he was voted the "funniest man of the year" by TF1 viewers from a choice of 50 comedians. On 15 July 2007, Elmaleh premiered his fifth one-man show, Papa est en haut, in Montreal as part of the Just for Laughs festival. That year he sold out seven consecutive weeks at the iconic Olympia theatre in Paris, a new record. After that he performed for another seven sold-out weeks at Le Palais des Sports. In total, one million tickets were sold to this show.

In 2013, he appeared on Jerry Seinfeld's Comedians in Cars Getting Coffee.

His sixth standup show was Sans Tambour (Drumless, "sans tambour ni trompette" (bugleless) = meaning making a big entrance unannounced).

In 2016, he appeared with Kev Adams in the M6 comedy special Tout est Possible. During the show, the two comedians performed a 10-minute sketch where they played Chinese men, which later received criticism for its racial portrayals.

Elmaleh has performed in a mix of French and Arabic in Morocco and included some Hebrew in shows in Israel. Elmaleh is often called the "Seinfeld of France," a label he called "flattering" and understandable, given that both he and Seinfeld are inspired to do comedy based on "everyday life." Both comedians are friends.

==== Move to the United States ====
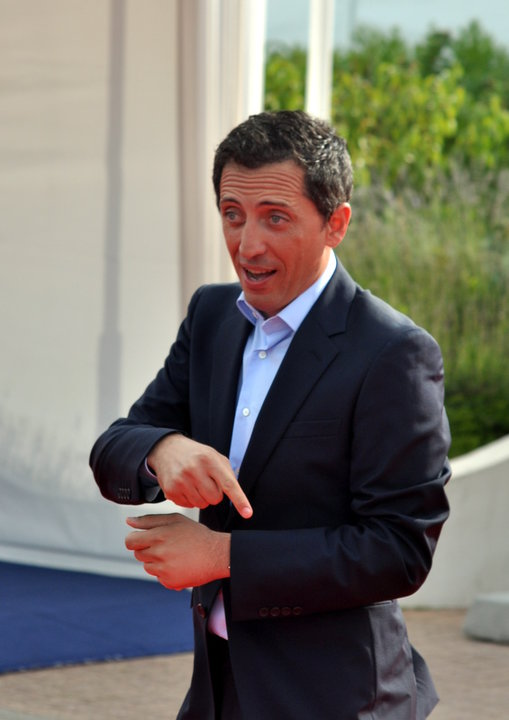
Elmaleh at the Deauville American Film Festival in 2010

In 2015 Elmaleh began an American tour entitled "Oh My Gad" and moved to New York City. He first appeared in Joe's Pub in December following multiple workout shows in the fall. While Elmaleh speaks English fluently, he works with an English teacher to write his jokes while appreciating the nuances of the English language. One difference between his French shows and his English shows is that his English shows include no riffing, everything is scripted. In September 2016, an episode of This American Life highlighting challenging transitions included a segment about Elmaleh and his transition to American comedy.

On a 15 December 2016 episode of The Late Show with Stephen Colbert, Elmaleh appeared as the show's stand-up act.

Elmaleh's French stand-up special Gad Gone Wild was filmed in Montreal, Canada, and was released on Netflix on 24 January 2017. An English language special was released in March 2018.

=== Acting ===
Elmaleh's first contact with cinema was the full-length film, Salut cousin ! by Merzak Allouache. He later appeared in L'homme est une femme comme les autres and Train de Vie. In 2000 he played the role of "Dov", the seducer in La Vérité si je mens ! 2. The character of "Chouchou" in La Vie Normale was reproduced in the comedy Chouchou (2002), directed by Merzak Allouache and also starring Alain Chabat; the film drew large audiences. He then did his debut as a singer in "it's kiz my life", a popular song in a non-existing language. The music video was directed by J.G Biggs and shot in the famous Parisian Hôtel Costes.

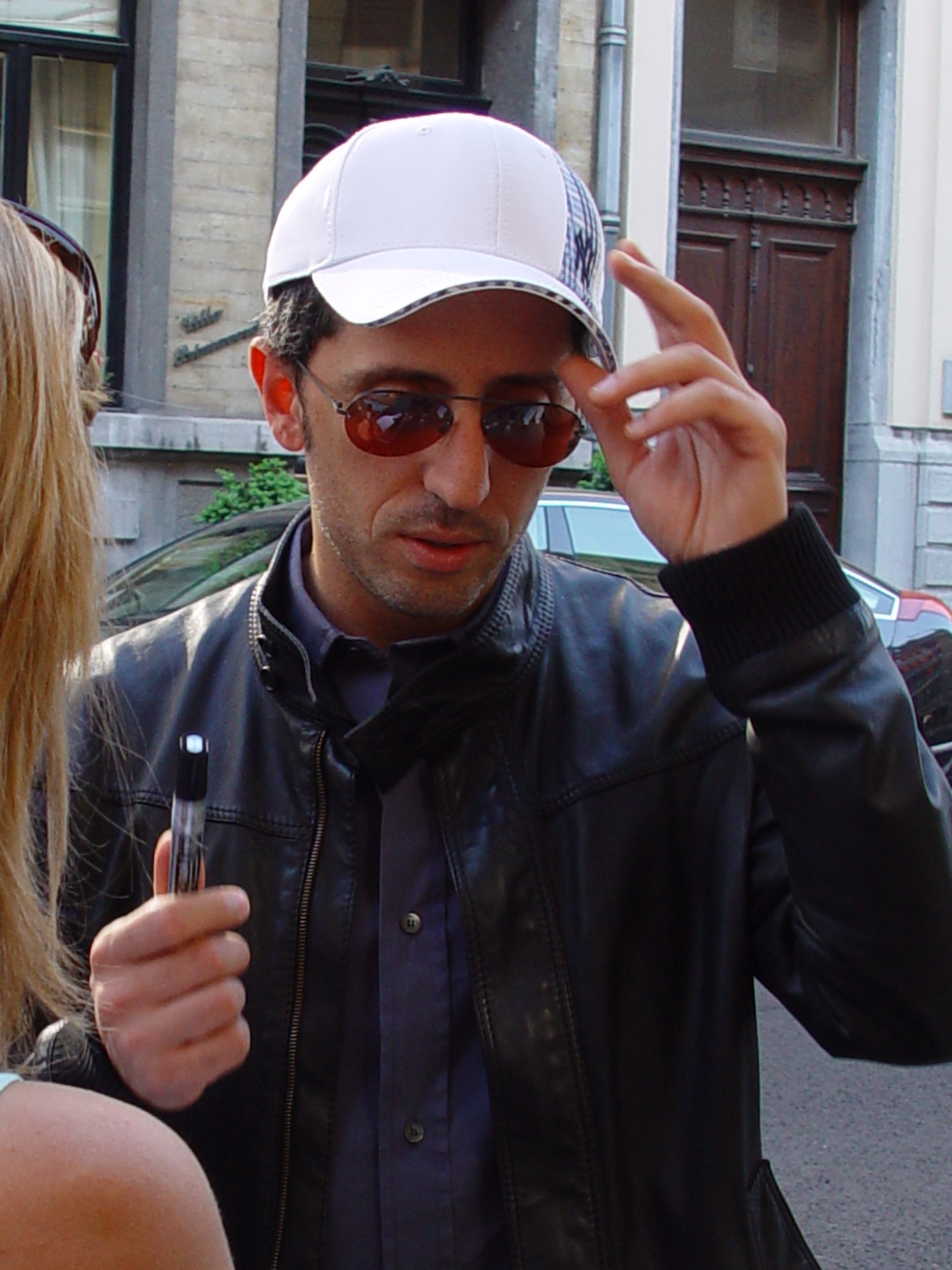
Elmaleh signing autographs in 2007

He returned to film in 2004 when he starred in the 2004 film Olé! with Gérard Depardieu. In 2005, he starred as François Pignon in La Doublure (English title "The Valet"), by Francis Veber. In 2006, he appeared opposite Audrey Tautou in Priceless (French title "Hors de prix"), by Pierre Salvadori.

He played the voice of Barry B. Benson in the French version of the 2007 film Bee Movie, Drôle d'Abeille. There he met Jerry Seinfeld and became friends with him.

In 2009, he released the film, Coco, which he directed, wrote and starred in. It opened number one in France, Belgium and Switzerland. In 2010 he appeared in a dramatic role in Roselyne Bosch's The Round Up, which is based on the events surrounding the Vel' d'Hiv Roundup.

In 2011, he had a small role in Woody Allen's Paris-set feature, Midnight in Paris. He also appeared in the motion capture film The Adventures of Tintin: The Secret of the Unicorn, alongside Jamie Bell. The film, which was directed by Steven Spielberg and produced by Peter Jackson, was released on 26 October 2011 in Belgium and on 23 December 2011 in the United States. The same year, he also starred in Jack & Jill as Al Pacino's French cook. In 2012, he had a small role in The Dictator. In 2019 he has a Netflix series, Huge in France, exposing him to a wider American audience. The satiric series includes a cameo by Jerry Seinfeld.

== Plagiarism controversy ==
On 28 January 2019, the anonymous YouTube channel CopyComic released a video showing various stand-up comedians performing several years prior to many of Gad Elmaleh's performances, showing similarities that the YouTube channel described as plagiarism. Elmaleh sued the YouTube channel and asked for the videos to be removed from the website, on copyright infringement grounds. On 24 September 2019, Elmaleh admitted to having taken inspiration from other artists in some cases, although minimising the proportion of it in his works: "We hear things and it infuses you. (...) In what is said to be plagiarism, there is what is fashionable, what we really take, and also the joke that runs, a little easy, that does not belong to anyone".

== Personal life ==
Elmaleh lived with French actress Anne Brochet from 1998 to 2002. They have one son, Noé, together. The story of their relationship and break-up was told in Brochet's book Trajet d'une amoureuse éconduite.

From 2009 to 2010, he had a relationship with French journalist Marie Drucker.

He was in a relationship with Charlotte Casiraghi from December 2011 until June 2015. Their son, Raphaël, was born on 17 December 2013.

It was reported that he converted to Catholicism in 2022. However, he denied actually converting in 2023.

== Honours ==
In 2004, Elmaleh received an award for the best one man show from SACEM in France. In 2006 he received a Crystal Globes Award. by the French Press Association, for best one man show for La Vie Normale.

In 2006 Elmaleh was awarded the Ordre des Arts et des Lettres by the French Minister of Culture Renaud Donnedieu de Vabres.

He was made a Member of the National Order of Quebec by Quebec premier Philippe Couillard in 2017.

== Filmography ==
- Les soeurs d'Hamlet (1996), plays the role of Hamlet
- XXL (1997) with Catherine Jacob, Michel Boujenah, Gérard Depardieu
- Hi Cousin (1997), plays the role of Allilou
- Vive la République ! (1997)
- Man Is a Woman (1998) with Antoine de Caunes, Elsa Zylberstein
- Train of Life (1998) with Lionel Abelanski, Rufus
- On fait comme on a dit (1999)
- Deuxième vie (2000), plays the role of Lionel
- Dr. Dolittle 2 (2000), French voice of Archie
- Les Gens en maillot de bain ne sont pas (forcément) superficiels (2001), plays the role of Jimmy
- La Vérité si je mens ! 2 (2001) with Richard Anconina, José Garcia, Bruno Solo, Gilbert Melki
- A+ Pollux (2002) with Cécile de France
- Chouchou (2003) with Alain Chabat, also screenwriter as Chouchou
- Les 11 commandements (2004) with Michaël Youn as himself
- Ole! with Gérard Depardieu (2005)
- The Valet with Alice Taglioni, Daniel Auteuil, Dany Boon, Virginie Ledoyen, Kristin Scott Thomas (2005)
- Priceless (2006) with Audrey Tautou
- Comme ton père (2007) with Richard Berry
- Bee Movie (2007), French voice of Barry B. Benson
- Coco (2009), also director and screenwriter
- Despicable Me (2010), French voice of Gru
- The Round Up (2010) with Mélanie Laurent, Jean Reno
- Midnight in Paris (2011)
- A Monster in Paris (2011), French and original voice of Raoul
- The Adventures of Tintin: The Secret of the Unicorn (2011) as Omar Ben Salaad
- Jack & Jill (2011), cameo as Chef Xavier
- Happiness Never Comes Alone (2012)
- Capital (2012) with Gabriel Byrne
- The Dream Team (2012) with José Garcia, Jean-Pierre Marielle, Joey Starr
- The Dictator (2012), cameo as a Wadiyan protestor
- Mood Indigo (2013) as Chick
- Despicable Me 2 (2013), French voice of Gru
- The Midnight Orchestra, (2014)
- Minions (2015), French voice of Gru (young)
- Pattaya, (2016)
- Welcome to America (Short), (2017)
- Loue-moi!, (2017)
- Despicable Me 3 (2017), French voice of Gru
- Huge in France (2019), TV series by Netflix
- Flashback (2021)
- Minions: The Rise of Gru (2022), French voice of Gru (young)
- Reste un peu (2022), as himself, also director and screenwriter
- Despicable Me 4 (2024), French voice of Gru

== Discography ==
=== Singles ===
Year	Title	Credited to	Peak positions	
Year	Title	Credited to	FRA	BEL (Wa)
2002	"It's Kyz My Life"	Gad Elmaleh feat. Bratisla Boys	27	–
2015	"Danse de la joie (Lalala)"	Gad Elmaleh & LiMa Project	52	46
