= Prix Jean Vigo =

French film award

The Prix Jean Vigo (French pronunciation: [pʁi ʒɑ̃ viɡo]) is an award in the French cinema given annually since 1951 to a French film director, in honor of Jean Vigo. Since 1960, the award has been given to both a director of a feature film and to a director of a short film. The award is usually given to a young director, for their independent spirit and stylistic originality.

== History ==
The Jean Vigo Prize has been awarded since 1951 as a tribute to film director Jean Vigo. It was created by Claude Aveline, the executor of Jean Vigo's will, Vigo's daughter Luce Vigo, and a number of filmmakers. Members of the first jury, in 1951, included Jacques Becker, Jean Cocteau, Paul Gilson, Georges Sadoul, and Luce Vigo.

The award recognizes films "for their inventiveness, originality and intellectual independence." The goal of the award is to "recognize a future auteur, [to] discover through him a passion and a gift," according to the 2018 jury.

== Winners ==
=== 1950s ===
Year	English title	Original title	Director(s)	Notes
1951	The Mountain is Green	La Montagne est verte	Jean Lehérissey	short
1952	La Grande Vie		Henri Schneider	
1953	White Mane	Crin Blanc	Albert Lamorisse	short
1954	Statues Also Die	Les statues meurent aussi	Alain Resnais, Chris Marker and Ghislain Cloquet	short
1955	Émile Zola		Jean Vidal	short
1956	Night and Fog	Nuit et Brouillard	Alain Resnais	short
1957	Léon la lune		Alain Jessua	short
1958	Les Femmes de Stermetz		Louis Grospierre	short
1959	Le Beau Serge		Claude Chabrol	

=== 1960s ===
Year	English title	Original title	Director(s)
1960	Breathless	À bout de souffle	Jean-Luc Godard
1961	La Peau et les os		Jean-Paul Sassy and Jacques Panuel
1962	War of the Buttons	La Guerre des boutons	Yves Robert
1963	To Die in Madrid	Mourir à Madrid	Frédéric Rossif
1964	La Belle Vie		Robert Enrico
1965	Not awarded		
1966	Black Girl	La Noire de...	Ousmane Sembène
1967	Who Are You, Polly Maggoo?	Qui êtes-vous, Polly Maggoo?	William Klein
1968	O Salto		Christian de Chalonge
1969	Naked Childhood	L'Enfance nue	Maurice Pialat

=== 1970s ===
Year	English title	Original title	Director(s)
1970	Hoa Binh	Hòa Bình	Raoul Coutard
1971	Ramparts of Clay	Remparts d'argile	Jean-Louis Bertuccelli
1972	Continental Circus		Jérôme Laperroussaz
1973	Repeated Absences	Absences répétées	Guy Gilles
1974	The Man Who Sleeps	Un homme qui dort	Bernard Queyssanne and Georges Perec
1975	The Story of Paul	Histoire de Paul	René Féret
1976	L'Affiche rouge		Frank Cassenti
1977	Paradiso		Christian Bricout
1978	Bako-l'autre rive		Jacques Champreux
1979	Certaines nouvelles		Jacques Davila

=== 1980s ===
Year	English title	Original title	Director(s)
1980	Ma blonde entends-tu dans la ville?		René Gilson
1981	Le Jardinier		Jean-Pierre Sentier
1982	L'Enfant Secret		Philippe Garrel
1984	Vive la sociale!		Gérard Mordillat
1985	Tea in the Harem	Le Thé au harem d'Archimède	Mehdi Charef
1986	Maine-Ocean Express		Jacques Rozier
1987	Buisson ardent		Laurent Perrin
1988	La Comédie du travail		Luc Moullet
1989	Chine ma douleur		Dai Sijie

=== 1990s ===
Year	English title	Original title	Director(s)
1990	Mona et moi		Patrick Grandperret
1991	Le Brasier		Éric Barbier
1992	Paris Awakens	Paris s'éveille	Olivier Assayas
1993	Les histoires d'amour finissent mal... en général		Anne Fontaine
1994	Trop de bonheur		Cédric Kahn
1995	Don't Forget You're Going to Die	N'oublie pas que tu vas mourir	Xavier Beauvois
1996	Encore		Pascal Bonitzer
1997	La Vie de Jésus		Bruno Dumont
1998	Tell Me I'm Dreaming		Claude Mouriéras
1999	La vie ne me fait pas peur		Noémie Lvoski

=== 2000s ===
Year	English title	Original title	Director(s)
2000	The King's Daughters	Saint-Cyr	Patricia Mazuy
2000	De l'histoire ancienne		Orso Miret
2001	Candidature		Emmanuel Bourdieu
2001	That Old Dream That Moves	Ce vieux rêve qui bouge	Alain Guiraudie
2002	Royal Bonbon		Charles Najman
2003	Toutes ces belles promesses		Jean-Paul Civeyrac
2004	Quand je serai star		Patrick Mimouni
2005	Les Yeux clairs		Jérôme Bonnell
2006	Le Dernier des fous		Laurent Achard
2007	La France		Serge Bozon
2008	Nulle part, terre promise		Emmanuel Finkiel
2009	Family Tree	L'Arbre et la Forêt	Olivier Ducastel and Jacques Martineau

=== 2010s ===
Year	English title	Original title	Director(s)	Notes
2010	Love Like Poison	Un poison violent	Katell Quillévéré	
2011	Smugglers' Songs	Les Chants de Mandrin	Rabah Ameur-Zaïmeche	
2012	L'Âge atomique		Héléna Klotz	
2013	L'Enclos du temps		Jean-Charles Fitoussi	
2014	Mange tes morts		Jean-Charles Hue	
2015	The Fear	La Peur	Damien Odoul	
2016	The Death of Louis XIV	La Mort de Louis XIV	Albert Serra	
2017	Barbara		Mathieu Amalric	
2018	Shéhérazade		Jean-Bernard Marlin	
2018	Knife+Heart	Un couteau dans le cœur	Yann Gonzalez	
2019	Vif-Argent		Stéphane Batut	

=== 2020s ===
Year	English title	Original title	Director(s)	Notes
2020	Énorme		Sophie Letourneur	
2021	Petite Solange		Axelle Ropert	
2022	Saint Omer		Alice Diop	
2023	La Rivière		Dominique Marchais	
2024	Holy Cow	Vingt Dieux	Louise Courvoisier	
2025	The Girl in the Snow	L'Engloutie	Louise Hémon	
2026	Voilà, c'est fini		Gustave Kervern	
2026	The Unknown	L'Inconnue	Arthur Harari	

== Short film ==
=== 1960s ===
- 1960: Enfants des courants d'air by Édouard Luntz
- 1961: not awarded
- 1962: 10 juin 1944 by Maurice Cohen
- 1963: La Jetée by Chris Marker
- 1964: La Saint-Firmin by Robert Destanque
- 1965: Fait à Coaraze by Gérard Belkin
- 1968: Désirée by Fernand Moszkowicz
- 1969: Le Deuxième Ciel by Louis-Roger

==== 1970s ====
- 1970: La Passion selon Florimond by Laurent Gomes
- 1971: Derniers hivers by Jean-Charles Tacchella
- 1973: Le Soldat et les trois sœurs by Pascal Aubier
- 1974: Septembre chilien by Bruno Muel and Théo Robichet
- 1975: La Corrida by Christian Broutin
- 1976: Caméra by Christian Paureilhe
- 1979: Nuit féline by Gérard Marx

==== 1980s ====
- 1982: Lourdes, l'hiver by Marie-Claude Treilhou
- 1983: La Fonte de Barlaeus by Pierre-Henri Salfati
- 1985: Épopine ou le Fer à repasser by Michel Chion
- 1986: Poussières d'étoiles by Agnès Merlet
- 1987: Pondichéry, juste avant l'oubli by Joël Fargès
- 1988: Elle et lui by François Margolin
- 1989: Le Porte-plume by Marie-Christine Perrodin

==== 1990s ====
- 1990: Elli Fat Man by Michel Such
- 1991: La Vie des morts by Arnaud Desplechin
- 1992: Des filles et des chiens by Sophie Fillières
- 1993: Faits et gestes by Emmanuel Descombes
- 1994: 75 centilitres de prières by Jacques Maillot
- 1995: Tous à la manif by Laurent Cantet
- 1997: Soyons amis! by Thomas Bardinet
- 1998: Les Corps ouverts by Sébastien Lifshitz
- 1999: Le Bleu du ciel by Christian Dor

==== 2000s ====
- 2000: Les Filles de mon pays by Yves Caumon
- 2001: Ce vieux rêve qui bouge by Alain Guiraudie
- 2002: L'Arpenteur by Michel Klein and Sarah Petit
- 2003: La Coupure by Nathalie Loubeyre
- 2004: La nuit sera longue by Olivier Torres
- 2005: La Peau trouée by Julien Samani
- 2006: De sortie by Thomas Salvador
- 2007: Silêncio by F. J. Ossang
- 2008: Les Paradis perdus by Hélier Cisterne
- 2009: Montparnasse by Mikhaël Hers

==== 2010s ====
- 2010: La République by Nicolas Pariser
- 2011: La Dame au chien by Damien Manivel
- 2012:
  - La Règle de trois by Louis Garrel
  - La Vie Parisienne by Vincent Dietschy
- 2013: Le Quepa sur la vilni! by Yann Le Quellec
- 2014: Inupiluk by Sébastien Betbeder
- 2015: Le Dernier des Céfrans by Pierre-Emmanuel Urcun
- 2016: Le Gouffre by Vincent Le Port
- 2017: Le Film de l'été by Emmanuel Marre
- 2018: L'Amie du dimanche by Guillaume Brac
- 2019: Braquer Poitiers by Claude Schmitz

==== 2020s ====
- 2020: Un adieu by Mathilde Profit
- 2021: Le Roi David by Lila Pinell
- 2022: Kindertotenlieder by Virgile Vernier
- 2023: J’ai vu le visage du diable by Julia Kowalski
- 2024: Car wash by Lais Decaster
- 2025: Bel Companho by David Ingels
- 2026: À la recherche de l'oiseau gris aux rayures vertes by Saïd Hamich Benlarbi

== "Vigo d'honneur" ==
Year	Winner
2008	Jacques Doillon
2010	Otar Iosseliani
2011	Jean-Marie Straub
2012	Agnès Varda
2013	Leos Carax
2016	Paul Vecchiali
2017	Aki Kaurismäki
2018	Jean-François Stévenin
2019	Alain Cavalier
2020	Arnaud and Jean-Marie Larrieu
2021	Claire Denis
2022	Jacques Nolot
2023	Claire Simon
2024	Elia Suleiman
2025	Wang Bing
2026	Alain Gomis

== Award in Spain ==
Spain's Punto de Vista International Documentary Film Festival presents the Premio Jean Vigo to the best director. The award aims to strengthen both the spirit that originally inspired the festival and the festival's commitment to the work of Jean Vigo. The creation of this prize was made possible thanks to the close ties between Punto de Vista and the family of the French filmmaker.

In 2005, the festival paid tribute to Vigo on the centenary of his birth. Luce Vigo, film critic and daughter of Vigo and Elizabeth Lozinska, attended that year. The festival provided a retrospective of Vigo's entire filmography and also represented the first step in a relationship that resulted in the award. The festival took its name, Punto de Vista (English: "point of view"), as a tribute to Vigo, the first director to refer, in the 1930s, to a “documented point of view” as a distinctive sign of a form of filmmaking that commits the filmmaker.
