= Salomé Stévenin =

French actress

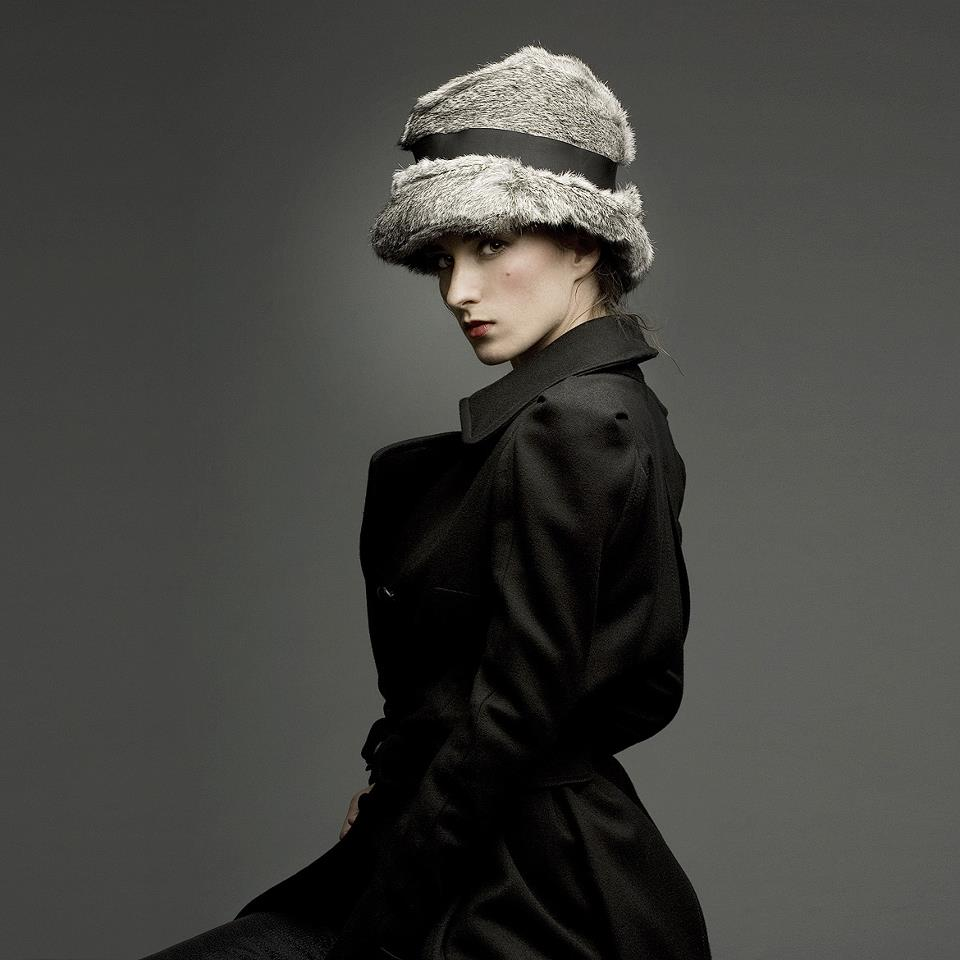
- Born: 29 January 1985 (age 41); Lons-le-Saunier, Jura, France
- Occupations: Actress, Film director, Screenwriter
- Years active: 1989–present

Salomé Stévenin (born 29 January 1985) is a French actress. She began her acting career at the age of 3, when she appeared alongside her father in the film Peaux des Vaches ("Thick Skinned") in 1989. Her recent appearances include the 2002 television film Clara cet été là (Clara's Summer) and Douches froides (Cold Showers) in 2005 for which she won the La Ciotat Film Festival Best Actress award.

She is the daughter of Jean-François Stévenin, and the sister of actors Sagamore Stévenin, Robinson Stévenin and Pierre Stévenin.

In 2015, she created a foundation Les merveilles du monde (The wonders of the world) working in India and Mexico to promote peace, joy, love, childhood and spiritual development (« la paix, la joie, l’amour, l’enfance, le développement spirituel et le soin »).

== Filmography ==
Year	Title	Role	Director	Notes
1989	Thick Skinned	Anna	Patricia Mazuy	
1993	L'instit	Irène	Jacques Ertaud	TV series (1 episode)
1994	Le jardin des plantes	Philippine Bornard	Philippe de Broca	TV movie
1995	Parents à mi-temps	Noémie	Alain Tasma	TV movie
1995	Noël et après	Katia	Daniel Vigne	TV movie
1996	La Belle Verte	Sophie	Coline Serreau	
1996	L'huile sur le feu	Céline	Jean-Daniel Verhaeghe	TV movie
1997	Soleil	Annie	Roger Hanin	
1997	Regards d'enfance	Mathilde	Patrice Martineau	TV series (1 episode)
2000	Love me	Gabrielle at 15	Laetitia Masson	
2000	La loire, Agnès et les garçons	Elise	Patrice Martineau (2)	TV movie
2001	Les duettistes: Jeunes proies	Alice	Marc Angelo	TV movie
2002	Mischka	Jane	Jean-François Stévenin	
2004	Clara cet été là	Sonia	Patrick Grandperret	TV movie
2005	Cold Showers	Vanessa	Antony Cordier	
2006	L'étoile de mer	Camille	Caroline Deruas-Garrel	Short
2006	Il a suffi que maman s'en aille...	Marie	René Féret	
2007	Tel père telle fille	Julie	Sylvie Ballyot	Short
2007	Regarde-moi	Daphné	Audrey Estrougo	
2008	Baïnes	Sarah	Salomé Stévenin	Short
2008	Like a Star Shining in the Night	Anne	René Féret (2)	
2008–10	La cour des grands	Audrey Rivière	Christophe Barraud, Dominique Ladoge	TV series (18 episodes)
2010	Mozart's Sister	Isabelle d'Aubusson	René Féret (3)	
2010	Cigarettes et bas nylons	Marie-Thérèse	Fabrice Cazeneuve	TV movie
2010	La fonte des glaces	Julie	Julien Lacheray, Stéphane Raymond	Short
2011	Un coeur qui bat	Maud	Christophe Barraud (2), Sophie Révil	
2011	Joseph l'insoumis	Suzanne	Caroline Glorion	TV movie
2011	Omar Killed Me	Maud	Roschdy Zem	
2011	Mon amoureux	Estelle	Daniel Metge	Short
2012	The Chef	Amandine	Daniel Cohen	
2012	Bagni 66	The tourist	Diego Governatori, Luca Governatori	
2012	Madame Solario	Missy Vlamink	René Féret (4)	
2013	Le sang de la vigne	Marianne de Vonnelle	Régis Musset	TV series (1 episode)
2013	Les Dames	Armony Lescudet	Philippe Venault	TV series (1 episode)
2013	Poussières	Sarah	Daniel Metge (2)	Short
2014	Lili Rose	Liza	Bruno Ballouard	
2015	Le Bureau des Légendes	Analyste Syrie	Hélier Cisterne	TV series (1 episode)
2016	Voices from Chernobyl	The Child	Pol Cruchten	
