= Laure Duthilleul =

French actress (born 1959)

- Born: 14 January 1959 (age 67); Versailles, France
- Occupations: Actress, director, screenwriter
- Years active: 1980–present

Laure Duthilleul (born 14 January 1959) is a French actress, director and screenwriter. She has appeared in more than 70 films and television shows since 1981. She has appeared in five films that have been screened at the Cannes Film Festival. She is the daughter of French architect Jean Duthilleul and the sister of Jean-Marie Duthilleul.

== Filmography ==
=== Actress ===
| Year | Title | Role | Director | Notes |
|---|---|---|---|---|
| 1978 | La fée du robinet | Marie | Alain Nahum | TV movie |
| 1980 | A Bad Son | | Claude Sautet | |
| 1980 | Très insuffisant | Laurence's friend | Hervé Bérard | |
| 1981 | Diva | Mirmont's friend | Jean-Jacques Beineix | |
| 1981 | Les matous sont romantiques | The girl at the window | Sotha | |
| 1982 | À toute allure | Nelly | Robert Kramer | |
| 1982 | Que les gros salaires lèvent le doigt! | Lum's secretary | Denys Granier-Deferre | |
| 1982 | Qu'est-ce qu'on attend pour être heureux! | The dresser | Coline Serreau | |
| 1982 | L'amour fugitif | The woman on the beach | Pascal Ortega | TV movie |
| 1982 | Bonbons en gros | Mireille | François Dupont-Midi | TV movie |
| 1982 | Deuil en vingt-quatre heures | Jacqueline | Frank Cassenti | TV mini-series |
| 1982 | On sort ce soir | | Gérard Chouchan | TV series (1 episode) |
| 1983 | Le jeune marié | Catherine | Bernard Stora | |
| 1983 | Le destin de Juliette | Juliette | Aline Issermann | Nominated - César Award for Most Promising Actress |
| 1984 | Le matelot 512 | Colette | René Allio | |
| 1984 | La boiteuse | The girl | Patricia Mazuy | Short |
| 1984 | Cinéma 16 | Marie | François Dupont-Midi | TV series (1 episode) |
| 1984 | Messieurs les jurés | Yvette Lalanne | Alain Franck | TV series (1 episode) |
| 1985 | Tea in the Harem | Josette | Mehdi Charef | |
| 1985 | C'était comment déjà | Rosine Bex | Hervé Baslé | TV movie |
| 1986 | Teresa | | Annie Madeleine Gonzalez | Short |
| 1986 | L'ami Maupassant | Caroline | Jacques Tréfouel | TV series (1 episode) |
| 1987 | Madame le maire | | Jean-François Claire | TV series (1 episode) |
| 1988 | L'île aux oiseaux | Pierrette | Geoffroy Larcher | |
| 1988 | Le bonheur se porte large | Caroline | Alex Métayer | |
| 1988 | Le vent des moissons | Madeleine Darrigaud | Jean Sagols | TV mini-series |
| 1989 | Thick Skinned | Sophie | Patricia Mazuy | |
| 1989 | Bouvard et Pecuchet | Mélie | Jean-Daniel Verhaeghe | TV movie |
| 1989 | Le masque | Nicole | Jean-Daniel Verhaeghe | TV series (1 episode) |
| 1989 | Pause-café | Emmanuelle Jubert | Serge Leroy | TV series (1 episode) |
| 1990 | La goutte d'or | The prostitute | Marcel Bluwal | TV movie |
| 1990 | Navarro | Muriel Flaubert | Serge Leroy | TV series (1 episode) |
| 1990 | Les Cinq Dernières Minutes | The teacher | Youri | TV series (1 episode) |
| 1992 | In the Country of Juliets | Therese | Mehdi Charef | |
| 1992 | Les envies de Camille | | Lionel Hayet | Short |
| 1992 | Mes coquins | Sainte | Jean-Daniel Verhaeghe | TV movie |
| 1992 | Parfum de bébé | Marion's mother | Serge Meynard | TV movie |
| 1994 | Le dernier tour | Simone | Thierry Chabert | TV movie |
| 1994 | Marie s'en va t-en guerre | The mother | David Delrieux | TV movie |
| 1995 | ...à la campagne | Françoise | Manuel Poirier | |
| 1995 | Un si bel orage | Isabelle de Laplane | Jean-Daniel Verhaeghe | TV movie |
| 1995 | La fête des pères | Nicole | Jean-Daniel Verhaeghe | TV movie |
| 1995 | La duchesse de Langeais | Duchesse de Langeais | Jean-Daniel Verhaeghe | TV movie |
| 1995 | Associations de bienfaiteurs | Zélig | Jean-Daniel Verhaeghe | TV mini-series |
| 1995 | Regards d'enfance | Various | Jean-Daniel Verhaeghe | TV series (1 episode) |
| 1996 | Walk the Walk | Nellie | Robert Kramer | |
| 1996 | Sortez des rangs | Madeleine | Jean-Denis Robert | |
| 1996 | L'huile sur le feu | Eva | Jean-Daniel Verhaeghe | TV movie |
| 1996 | Le poids d'un secret | Claire Monceau | Denis Malleval | TV movie |
| 1996 | Le parfum de Jeannette | Madame Fèche | Jean-Daniel Verhaeghe | TV movie |
| 1996 | Les Steenfort, maîtres de l'orge | Elise Steenfort Chevalier | Jean-Daniel Verhaeghe | TV mini-series |
| 1996 | L'histoire du samedi | Inès | Françoise Decaux-Thomelet | TV series (1 episode) |
| 1996 | Zwarte sneeuw | Anne | Maarten Treurniet | TV series (2 episodes) |
| 1997 | Mars ou la terre | Sacha | Bertrand Arthuys | TV movie |
| 1997 | Le censeur du lycée d'Epinal | Marianne Denamur | Marc Rivière | TV movie |
| 1998 | Rider of the Flames | Seifensusette | Nina Grosse | |
| 1998 | Les brumes de Manchester | Rachel Collins | Jean-Daniel Verhaeghe | TV movie |
| 1998 | Au coeur de la loi | Corinne Lacole | Denis Malleval | TV series (1 episode) |
| 1999 | Le porteur de destins | Louise Chèze | Denis Malleval | TV movie |
| 1999 | Chasseurs d'écume | Armelle | Denys Granier-Deferre | TV mini-series |
| 1999 | Combats de femme | Isabelle | Emmanuelle Cuau | TV series (1 episode) |
| 2000 | Maigret | Evelyne Tremblet | François Luciani | TV series (1 episode) |
| 2000 | Mary Lester | Annick Guiriec | Philomène Esposito | TV series (1 episode) |
| 2000 | L'histoire du samedi | Maryse Chamier | Rémy Burkel | TV series (1 episode) |
| 2001 | Les âmes câlines | Hélène | Thomas Bardinet | |
| 2001 | 2 X 2 versions de l'amour | | Patricia Bardon | Short |
| 2001 | La course en fête | Hilda | Daniel Losset | TV movie |
| 2003 | L'aubaine | Criquette | Aline Issermann | TV movie |
| 2003 | Ciel d'asile | Christine | Philippe Bérenger | TV movie |
| 2003 | Josephine, Guardian Angel | Eliane | Stéphane Kurc | TV series (1 episode) |
| 2004 | Nos vies rêvées | Sylvette Marant | Fabrice Cazeneuve | TV movie |
| 2004 | L'instit | The teacher | Jean Sagols | TV series (1 episode) |
| 2005 | L'un reste, l'autre part | Isabelle | Claude Berri | |
| 2006 | Les fragments d'Antonin | Marie | Gabriel Le Bomin | |
| 2007 | Trivial | Marilou | Sophie Marceau | |
| 2007 | Vérités assassines | | Arnaud Sélignac | TV movie |
| 2008 | De nouvelles vies | Camille | Stéphane Kurc | TV movie |
| 2009 | Rendez-vous à Stella-Plage | The mother | Shalimar Preuss | Short |
| 2011 | Twiggy | The consultant | Emmanuelle Millet | |
| 2011 | All Our Desires | Carole | Philippe Lioret | |
| 2011 | Un baiser papillon | The psychiatrist | Karine Silla | |
| 2013 | Turning Tide | The teacher | Christophe Offenstein | |
| 2014 | Marie's Story | Madame Heurtin | Jean-Pierre Améris | |
| 2016 | Le come back | Nicky | Pierre Jampy | Short |
| 2016 | Origines | Lucas's mother | Nicolas Herdt | TV series (1 episode) |

=== Filmmaker ===
| Year | Title | Role | Notes |
|---|---|---|---|
| 2004 | Nelly | Director & writer | Nominated - Cannes Film Festival - Caméra d'Or; Nominated - Cannes Film Festival - Un Certain Regard Award |
| 2010 | Empreintes | Director | TV series (1 episode) |
| 2018 | Mme Mills, une voisine si parfaite | Writer | |
| 2020 | Les Mystères de Brouage | Writer | TV movie |

== Theater ==
| Year | Title | Author | Director |
|---|---|---|---|
| 1984 | Das weite Land | Arthur Schnitzler | Luc Bondy |
| 2001 | The Maids | Jean Genet | Alfredo Arias |
