= Madame Solario =

2012 film by René Féret

Madame Solario is a 2012 French drama film written, produced and directed by René Féret, based on the 1956 novel of the same name by Gladys Huntington. It concerns a young divorcee, of the title, and her brother, whose presence and relationship disrupts the calm of a grand lakeside hotel in the early 1900s.

== Background ==
Féret had for a long time considered making a film based on Der Erwählte (The Holy Sinner) by Thomas Mann, a subject concerning love between a brother and sister, as well as on the anonymous French source which had inspired Mann's 1951 novel. He also read Anna, soror, a 1981 novel by Marguerite Yourcenar, this leading him on to the work by Gladys Huntington which had been one of Yourcenar's favourite books. Forbidden love is depicted in a hidebound society, within the small upper-class world at a resort on Lake Como, where the siblings become tangled in their web. He met Bernard Cohen, a journalist-translator passionate about the novel, who assisted him greatly, notably in obtaining the rights for the book. In his film Mystère Alexina Féret had worked with the private journal of the hermaphrodite Herculine Barbin, condemned to emmesh herself in another identity, where the theme of the social relationship between love outside of rules, and those who impose the rules. The character of Madame Solario also intrigued the director Joseph Losey, who put her as one of his three favourtie fictional heroines, alongside Clea by Lawrence Durrell and Anna Karenina. The Hollywood producer Daniel Selznick had shown interest in bringing Huntington's work to the big screen during her lifetime.

Sister and brother find themselves confronted by the organized, regulated social class, which indulges all the immoralities provided they are not seen or spoken. The novel had an especial appeal for him as it was fierce critic of an utterly privileged yet rotten milieu, obsessed with outward appearance; leaning on this theme avoided making the incestuous relation just a romantic story but demonstrated that in the end the relationship was the result of suffocation and past trauma. Natalia retains the awkwardness of adolescence, given the trauma she experienced but which "she hides behind her veiled beauty". The Russian is a wealthy, brutal and unbending man while Bernard is a young English virgin madly in love with Natalia; Eugène is "the accursed brother, a decadent Delon, pushy, seductive, making dangerous connections with all the attractive women he meets". Féret felt he was quite faithful to the novel, with the same characters, same narrative structure, plus the ambiguity and refusal to romanticize the love story. He was happy to follow the novel and its ambiguity although he felt that he made things clearer in the film: that these two have suffered traumatic events in the past which have led to their behaviour but in an open way without violence, or excess. The director expressed a general dislike for realist acting which is often automatic, reflexes, clichés, preferring "distance and listening to what is written". Stévenin created a somewhat "comic, electric, exciting" portrayal. Descours was "precise, incisive, receptive" to Féret's advice. Madame Solario remains enigmatic, impossible to fit in a social mold, and as in the novel we do not know what will happen to her.

== Production ==
The film was shot in super 16 scope anamorphic. Interior filming at 25, Champs-Elysées, 'la Païva', with its great staircase in yellow onyx, designed by Paul Baudry in the 19th century, took place over three weeks before the crew went to Lake Como for location filming, at the Villa Monastero, and its lakeside gardens. The producer Christophe Rossignon (whom Féret asked to play the marquis) was much impressed by Nannerl, la soeur de Mozart, and approached Féret to help on the production side.

Several actors from Féret's previous film, from 2010, Nannerl, la sœur de Mozart (Nannerl, Mozart's Sister), also about sibling relations, appear in this: Marie Féret, who took the title role of Nannerl, Marc Barbé, the young violinist David Moreau, Lisa Féret, Mona Heftre and Salomé Stévenin (for whom Madame Solario was her fourth Féret film).

The main locations used were the Hôtel de la Païva in Paris for the interior shots of the Como hotel, and the Villa Monastero on Lake Como for exteriors. Féret commented that symbolically the lake – a dull, tranquil place with, in its depths, the unimaginable monster – was perfect, more so as it was where Huntington spent some childhood vacations.

While terrestrial television channels were not supportive of the project, Canal+ did commit itself, and the Île de France Region also supported the director for the third time. The film was edited by Féret's wife Fabienne, lasts 93 minutes, and was released in French cinemas on the 22nd August 2012.

== Synopsis ==
Lake Como, September 1906.

The scene is set by the voice off of an innocent young English lord, Bernard, who describes the congenial atmosphere and rich or aristocratic guests staying at the Hôtel Bellevue on Lake Como. He notes everyone's fascination with Madame Solario, young, beautiful but also bankrupt and recently divorced, but particular admired by a Russian count, and himself. The Count, obsessed with Natalia, had begun to court Natalia in Rome and followed her on to Como.

Into this world Natalia Solario's handsome brother, Eugène Ardent, whom she hasn't seen for several years makes a sudden appearance. Many of the guests are fascinated and curious about the brother and sister. Having fled France and lived in South America, he also needs money, and learning that she was disinherited by their step-father he notices the possibilities of advancement among the rich guests, urges her to join him in seducing one to improve their situations; they alight on an older marquis for her and his wife the marquise for Eugène, an arrangement which would keep them together for ever. He finds it easy to charm those whom he encounters at the hotel, she less so, and after such a long separation from him, she expresses both happiness and some embarrassment.

It emerges that when 16 her stepfather had fallen in love with and forced himself on Natalia, and subsequently that Eugène had tried to kill him, and was as a result despatched to the other side of the world so as not to be seen again. Two years later Natalia entered an unconsumated marriage with a Monsieur Solario, a South American friend of her stepfather. Meanwhile, Eugène has by his own admission to his sister been living a dissipated life in Chile.

After some days dallying with the de Florels, and Eugène flirting with Missy, they realize that the latter has guessed the intimate side of their relationship. Following a public scene with Missy, Eugène flees the hotel, and the de Florels leave, unannounced, in shame. Natalia asks Bernard to accompany her to Lausanne to find an old friend of her father. But they are discovered there by Eugène and Kovanski. After the four partake a disputatious dinner, Natalia promises to see Kovanski, but he shoots himself when he discovers that brother and sister have secretly left the hotel at dawn; Bernard is desolate. The closing scene shows Natalia and Eugène together in the buffet car of a train.

== Cast ==
- Natalia Solario (Hélène "Nelly" Ardent) : Marie Féret
- Eugène Ardent : Cyril Descours
- Lord Bernard Middleton : Harry Lister Smith
- Matilde 'Missy' Vlamynck : Salomé Stévenin
- Count Kovanski : Andrei Zayats
- Martha Leroy : Lisa Féret
- Marquis Griset de Florel : Christophe Rossignon
- Marquise : Arianna Pollini
- Missy's mother : Mona Heftre
- Doctor : Marc Barbé
- Colonel Ross : Scott Thrun
- Mrs Ross : Chrystel Seyvecou
- Pico : Julien Febvre
- The pianist : Régis Simon
- Hôtel Bellevue concierge : Mickaël Caffier
- Page at the Hôtel Bellevue : Lorenzo Gnozzi
- Manager of the Hôtel de Lausanne : Frédéric Attard
- Page at the Hôtel de Lausanne : David Moreau
- Martha's grandmother : Camilla De Marchi
- Kovanski's manservant : Frédéric Hulné

== Music ==
The soundtrack score is by French pianist Patrick Dechorgnat (his first film score) played by members of the Orchestre de l’Opéra de Paris, Frédéric Laroque, Marion Desbruères (violins), Laurent Verney (viola), and Aurélien Sabouret (cello). Additional pieces of music used in the film are by Saint-Saëns, his Suite, Op. 16, and Sérénade Quatuor No.1 en mi mineur op.112, two waltzes by Waldteufel : Joies envolées and Les sourires, Maurice Vaucaire et Paul Delmet's popular song Les Petits Pavés (sung by Stévenin), and the waltz Sobre las olas by Juventino Rosas.

== Critical responses ==
A critic noted Féret's continued exploration of family relationships, and questioning the burden of familial structures on social conditioning, gently disturbing notions of totems and tabous. Huntington's novel lays the foundation for Féret's inventiveness and talent, to create a "disturbing and dense" film, of atmosphere and tension, incestuous love, disguises and lies.

The film slips behind the pleasing façade of happy and companionable hotel guests; the clothes they have not only show their status but the conventions which bind them. The director tactfully but surgically cuts into this universe of "false pretence, of civil behaviour which conceals rumours and whispering". One commentator found the direction of Féret inspired, and the costumes magnificent. The "scar on Eugène's right cheek-bone is like a breech in his angel mask"; and "the silver reflections of the lake cover dark depths surrounded by the bristling jaw-shaped mountains".

One critic summed up by noting that Féret draws a "romantic miniature", carried along by magnificent writing of repressed feelings and desire. "On this chessboard of forbidden loves, he films in chiaroscuro an overwhelming game of passionate cruelty where the disturbing and intense acting of Cyril Descours" compels attention.
