= Metge =

Metge is a surname. Notable people with the surname include:

- Bernat Metge (c. 1350 – 1410), Catalan writer and humanist
- Cedric Metge (1900–1985), New Zealand cricketer
- Daniel Metge (born 1970), French screenwriter and film director
- Joan Metge (1930–2025), New Zealand social anthropologist, educator, lecturer and writer
- Lillian Metge (1871–1954), Anglo-Irish suffragette and women's rights campaigner
- Peter Metge (c. 1740–1809), Irish politician and judge
- René Metge (1941–2024), French rally driver
- Robert Henry Metge (1850–1900), Irish Home Rule League politician
