= Claire Nebout =

French actress

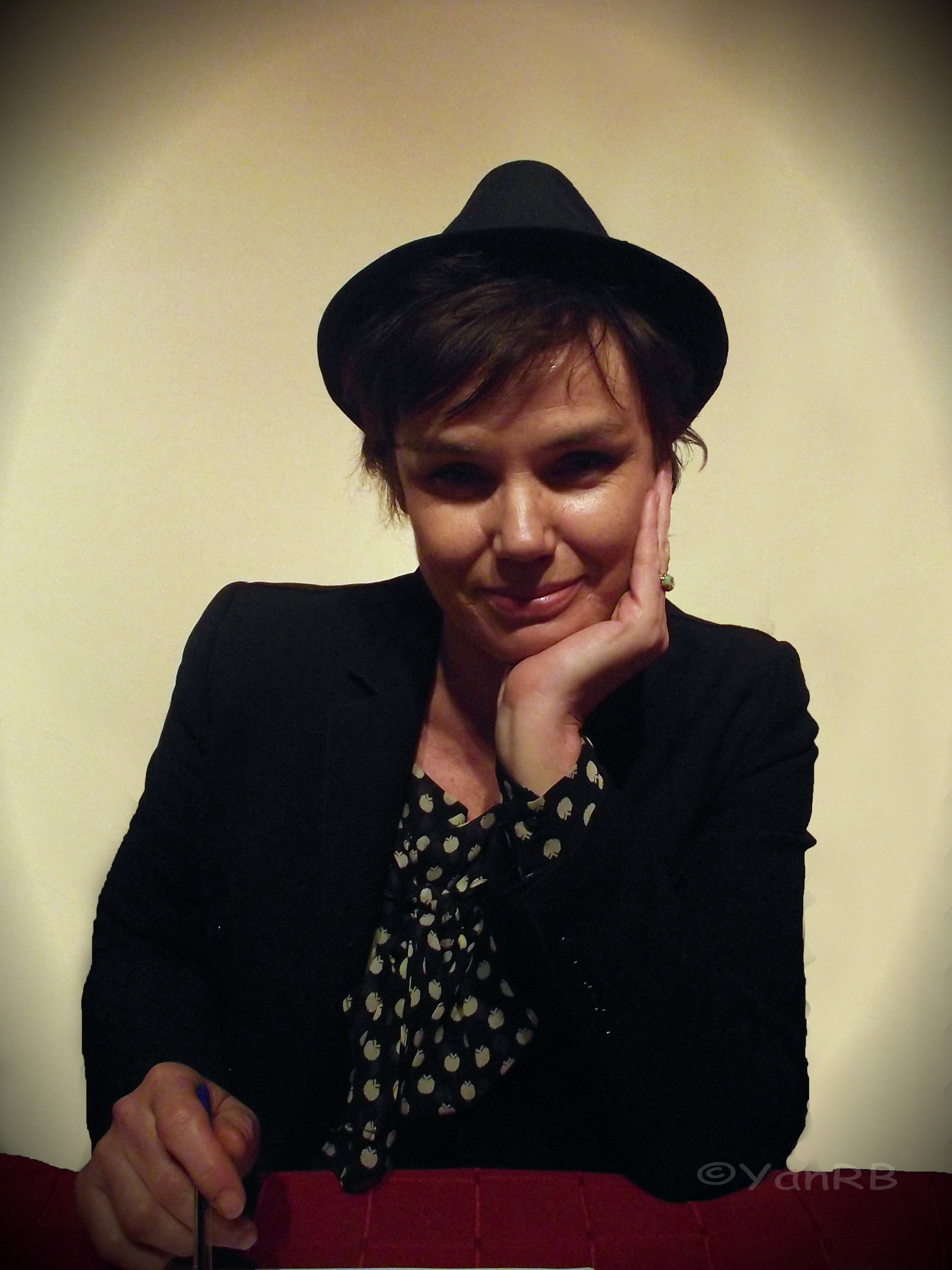
- Born: 20 May 1964 (age 62); Bourg-la-Reine, France
- Occupation: Actress
- Years active: 1986-present

Claire Nebout (French: [klɛʁ nəbu]; born 20 May 1964) is a French actress. She has appeared in 55 films and television shows since 1986. She co-starred in In the Country of Juliets, which was entered into the 1992 Cannes Film Festival.

== Filmography ==
Year	Title	Role	Director	Notes
1986	Scene of the Crime	Alice	André Téchiné	
1986	La femme secrète	Marie	Sébastien Grall	
1986	Claire X et la cité rose		Rémi Loca	Short
1987	Association of Wrongdoers	Claire	Claude Zidi	
1987	Spirale	Simorre	Christopher Frank	
1987	Nuit docile	Stella	Guy Gilles	
1988	Una notte, un sogno		Massimo Manuelli	
1989	Coplan	Julia	Peter Kassovitz	TV Series (1 Episode)
1989	Orages d'été	Christine	Jean Sagols	TV Series
1990	Moody Beach	Laurence	Richard Roy	
1990	V comme vengeance	Corinne	Luc Béraud	TV Series (1 Episode)
1991	The Conviction	Sandra Celestini	Marco Bellocchio	
1991	Tout recommencer		Franck Chiche	Short
1992	Archipel	Alexandra Hamilton	Pierre Granier-Deferre	
1992	In the Country of Juliets	Henriette	Mehdi Charef	
1994	Julie Lescaut	Carole	Josée Dayan	TV Series (1 Episode)
1994	Mort d'un gardien de la paix	Fanny Lebret	Josée Dayan (2)	TV Movie
1994	Comme tout le monde		Patricia Desmortiers	Short
1995	La Rivière Espérance	Emeline Lombard	Josée Dayan (3)	TV Mini-Series
1995	Vroum-vroum		Frédéric Sojcher	Short
1996	Beaumarchais	Chevalier d'Eon	Édouard Molinaro	
1996	Ponette	Aunt Claire	Jacques Doillon	
1997	On Guard	Blanche de Caylus	Philippe de Broca	
1998	The Violent Earth	Hélène	Michael Offer	TV Mini-Series
1998	Cantique de la racaille	Patricia	Vincent Ravalec	
1999	Un bonheur si fragile	Sophie	Jacques Otmezguine	TV Movie
1999	Venus Beauty Institute	The exhibitionist client	Tonie Marshall	
1999	Sam	Sam Leroy	Yves Boisset	TV Movie
1999	New Dawn	Isabelle	Émilie Deleuze	
2001	Tel père, telle flic	Nathalie Sourdeval	Eric Woreth	TV Series (1 Episode)
2001	Les p'tits gars Ladouceur	Nadine	Luc Béraud (2)	TV Movie
2001	Le grand patron	Georgia Elbaz	Claude-Michel Rome	TV Series (2 Episodes)
2001	Regarde-moi		Frédéric Sojcher (2)	
2002	Traitement de substitution n°4		Christian Chapiron	
2002	Sumoto Life	The recruiter	Jean Pillet	Short
2002	Vertiges	Clara	Douglas Law	TV Series (1 Episode)
2002	Un paradis pour deux	Angela	Pierre Sisser	TV Movie
2002	Raisons économiques	The hostile woman	Patrice Jourdan & Sören Prévost	Short
2003	Anomalies passagères	France	Nadia Farès	TV Series
2003	Dear Hunter	Nora	Franck Saint-Cast	Short
2004	La Ronde des Flandres	Marie	André Chandelle	TV Movie
2004	Eros thérapie	Dréanne	Danièle Dubroux	
2005	Des jours et des nuits	Clara Deligny	Thierry Chabert	TV Movie
2005	Trois couples en quête d'orages	Estelle	Jacques Otmezguine (2)	
2005	Huis clos	Inès	Jean-Louis Lorenzi	TV Movie
2005	Cold Showers	Mathilde Steiner	Antony Cordier	
2005	Inséparables	Josiane	Élisabeth Rappeneau	TV Series (1 Episode)
2006	La crim'	Chief Roussel	Eric Woreth (2)	TV Series (6 Episodes)
2006	Laura, le compte à rebours a commencé	Viviane	Jean-Teddy Filippe	TV Mini-Series
2006	On va s'aimer	Frédérique	Ivan Calbérac	
2006	Président	Mathilde	Lionel Delplanque	
2006	La contessa di Castiglione	Mathilde Bonaparte	Josée Dayan (4)	TV Movie
2008	Cortex	Sandra	Nicolas Boukhrief	
2008	Love Me No More	Clara	Jean Becker	
2009	La différence, c'est que c'est pas pareil	Diane	Pascal Laëthier	
2009	Les chiens jaunes	The mother	Tatiana Becquet & Jean-Pierre Larcher	Short
2010	Vivace	Mathilde	Pierre Boutron	TV Movie
2011	Moi et ses ex	Marielle	Vincent Giovanni	TV Movie
2012	Nos retrouvailles	Louise Maubert	Josée Dayan (5)	TV Movie
2012	Dubaï Flamingo	The singer	Delphine Kreuter	
2012	Clash	Sylvia	Pascal Lahmani	TV Series (1 Episode)
2012	Le jardin des Eden	Madame Eden	Sébastien Ors	Short
2013	Le clan des Lanzac	Laurence Verneuil	Josée Dayan (6)	TV Movie
2011-14	Le sang de la vigne	France Pelletier	Marc Rivière & Aruna Villiers	TV Series (6 Episodes)
2014	Rebecca	Hallucination	Tatiana Becquet (2)	Short
2008-15	Nicolas Le Floch	La Paulet	Edwin Baily, Nicolas Picard & Philippe Bérenger	TV Series (7 Episodes)
2015	Graziella	Alice	Mehdi Charef (2)	
2015	La vie devant elles	Valérie	Gabriel Aghion	TV Series (6 Episodes)
2015	Lilith		Tatiana Becquet (3)	Short
2016	Capitaine Marleau	Miléna Ferey	Josée Dayan (7)	TV Series (1 Episode)
