= Marc Barbé =

French actor

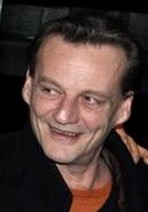
- Born: 6 May 1961 (age 65); Nancy, France
- Occupation: Actor
- Years active: 1992-present

Marc Barbé (born 6 May 1961) is a French film actor. He has appeared in more than fifty films.

== Selected filmography ==
Year	Title	Role	Notes
1998	Sombre		
2005	The Ring Finger	The laboratory man	
2006	The Untouchable	François	
2007	La Vie en rose		
2007	Intimate Enemies		
2009	Silent Voice	Pierre	
2010	Mozart's Sister	Leopold Mozart	
2011	Calm at Sea		
2012	Madame Solario		
2012	My Way		
2013	The Nun		
2015	A Perfect Man	Vincent	
