= Solemn Communion =

1977 film

- Film poster
- Directed by: René Féret
- Written by: René Féret
- Produced by: René Féret; Michelle Plaa
- Starring: Christian Drillaud
- Cinematography: Jean-François Robin
- Edited by: Vincent Pinel
- Music by: Sergio Ortega
- Distributed by: Planfilm
- Release date: 27 April 1977
- Running time: 105 minutes
- Country: France
- Language: French
- Box office: 397,460 admissions (France)

Solemn Communion (French: La Communion solennelle) is a 1977 French comedy-drama film directed by René Féret. It was entered into the 1977 Cannes Film Festival.

== Cast ==
- Christian Drillaud as Young Charles Gravet
- Claude Bouchery as Jules Ternolain
- Isabelle Caillard as Young Josette Dauchy
- Patrick Fierry as Young François Dauchy
- Véronique Silver as Josette Dauchy at 40
- Marcel Dalio as Old Charles Gravet
- Myriam Boyer as Léone Gravet
- Manuel Strosser as Julien III Gravet
- André Marcon as Lucien Gravet
- Marief Guittier as Julie Ternolain at 25
- Claude-Emile Rosen as Honore Dauchy
- René Féret as Julien I Gravet at 30
- Andrée Tainsy as Charlotte
- Roland Amstutz as Raoul L'Homme, le fils naturel de François
- Monique Mélinand as Julie Ternolain at 45
- Vincent Pinel as Leon Gravet
- Ariane Ascaride as Palmyre
- Yveline Ailhaud as Marie
- Eric Lebel as Julien I Gravet as child
- Nathalie Baye as Jeanne Vanderberghe
- Gérard Chaillou as Marcel Dauchy
- Yves Reynaud as Gaston Gravet
- Fabienne Arel as Mathilde Ternolain
- Philippe Léotard as Jacques Gravet
- Jany Gastaldi as Lise Paulet-Dauchy at 20
- Monique Chaumette as Lise Paulet-Dauchy at 40
- Guillaume Lebel as Julien II Gravet
- Paul Descombes as Julien I Gravet at 50
- Olivier Caillard as Armand Gravet
- Pierre Forget as François Dauchy at 50
- Serge Reggiani as Récitant chanteur (voice)
- Alain Chevalier
- Philippe Nahon as a unionist
