= In the Country of Juliets =

1992 film

- Film poster
- Directed by: Mehdi Charef
- Written by: Mehdi Charef; Christine Brière
- Produced by: Daniel Toscan du Plantier
- Starring: Laure Duthilleul
- Cinematography: Gérard de Battista
- Edited by: Christian Dior
- Release date: 17 June 1992
- Running time: 92 minutes
- Country: France
- Language: French

In the Country of Juliets (French: Au pays des Juliets) is a 1992 French drama film directed by Mehdi Charef. It was entered into the 1992 Cannes Film Festival.

== Cast ==
- Laure Duthilleul - Therese
- Claire Nebout - Henriette
- Maria Schneider - Raissa
