= The Conviction =

1991 film

- Film poster
- Directed by: Marco Bellocchio
- Written by: Marco Bellocchio; Massimo Fagioli
- Produced by: Pietro Valsecchi
- Starring: Vittorio Mezzogiorno; Andrzej Seweryn; Claire Nebout; Grażyna Szapołowska
- Cinematography: Giuseppe Lanci
- Edited by: Mirco Garrone
- Music by: Carlo Crivelli
- Release date: 28 February 1991
- Running time: 92 minutes
- Country: Italy
- Language: Italian

The Conviction (Italian: La condanna) is a 1991 Italian drama film directed by Marco Bellocchio. It was entered into the 41st Berlin International Film Festival where it won the Silver Bear Special Jury Prize. Bellocchio wrote the script with his psychotherapist Massimo Fagioli; the two had previously collaborated on the 1986 film Devil in the Flesh.

== Plot ==
Sandra Celestini, a college student on a field trip with her art class, becomes trapped overnight in a museum. The only other company there is Lorenzo Colajanni, an architect. Lorenzo befriends Sandra and eventually seduces her into having sex with him. Sandra later discovers that Lorenzo had the museum keys the whole time. She brings rape charges against him.

During the trial, Lorenzo pontificates on the nature of consent and maintains Sandra desired the sex. He argues that because Sandra orgasmed during their night together, her pleasure implies consent, and therefore what he did cannot be considered rape. Giovanni, the state attorney, succeeds in convicting Lorenzo, but he is met with disapproval instead of praise from the general public. Giovanni's wife Monica, who is sexually dissatisfied in her marriage and longs for a more aggressive partner, is repulsed by the trial's outcome and ends up leaving Giovanni. Lorenzo is ultimately sentenced to jail. Giovanni happens to run into Sandra at a party, but when she sees the attorney, she pushes his face into a cake.

== Cast ==
- Vittorio Mezzogiorno as Lorenzo Colajanni
- Andrzej Seweryn as Giovanni
- Claire Nebout as Sandra Celestini
- Grażyna Szapołowska as Monica
- Maria Schneider as Gitana
- Paolo Graziosi as Giudice

== Release ==
The film premiered at the Berlin Film Festival in February 1991. It later opened theatrically in Italy on February 28, 1991. In the United States, it screened at the Chicago International Film Festival and was given a limited theatrical release beginning on May 13, 1994.

== Critical reception ==
The film received a mixed response and generated controversy for its treatment of rape and consent, with some critics contending that the film pushes a victim blaming sentiment. Caryn James of The New York Times said the film "takes topical, explosive issues -- rape, sexual harassment, power plays between the sexes -- and reduces them into a forgettable puff of hot air". TV Guide wrote, "The film's greatest weakness is that it sticks chunks of position-paper talking into the mouths of the characters, rather than allowing them dimensions beyond their sexual grievances or revealing their contradictory attitudes through engaging dialogue." The Chicago Tribune praised the cinematography but similarly criticized the dialogue, particularly in the trial scenes, as "so arch and pretentious the film seems unconsciously comic".

TV Guide added, "Since director Marco Bellocchio doesn't choose to shape the speeches with any artistic flourish, The Conviction remains unadorned monologue art. It's the ideas that excite, rather than the quality of the writing. Although Bellocchio tries to balance the conflicting points of view (forced sex vs. consensual sex in a calculated power play), he really seems bent on creating an apologia for Lorenzo."

In the Chicago Reader, Jonathan Rosenbaum wrote, "Bellocchio seems to think he has a point; as he puts it, 'I am convinced that violence against women must be severely punished by law, but at the same time the perpetrator or the rapist is not really a rapist, but the 'ideal' man which every woman is looking for deep down, the man who does not destroy the woman’s identity, but by stimulating her desire does not disappoint her and therefore enables her to 'be born' and to strengthen her own identity.' Come again?"

Marjorie Baumgarten of The Austin Chronicle gave the film 1 and ½ out of 5 stars. She wrote the film "fits a morality play structure more than a drama. And, while the morality under examination is fascinating and may actually lead to some breakthrough discoveries, the assumptions guiding its path are grounded in patriarchal nonsense and cultural sandbags." Caryn James added, "Mr. Bellocchio obviously intends the sly references and stylized nature of this film, but he couldn't possibly have intended it to be this much of a howler. Relations between the sexes are complicated, but rarely as lunatic as they are made to seem here."
