= Serge Riaboukine =

French actor

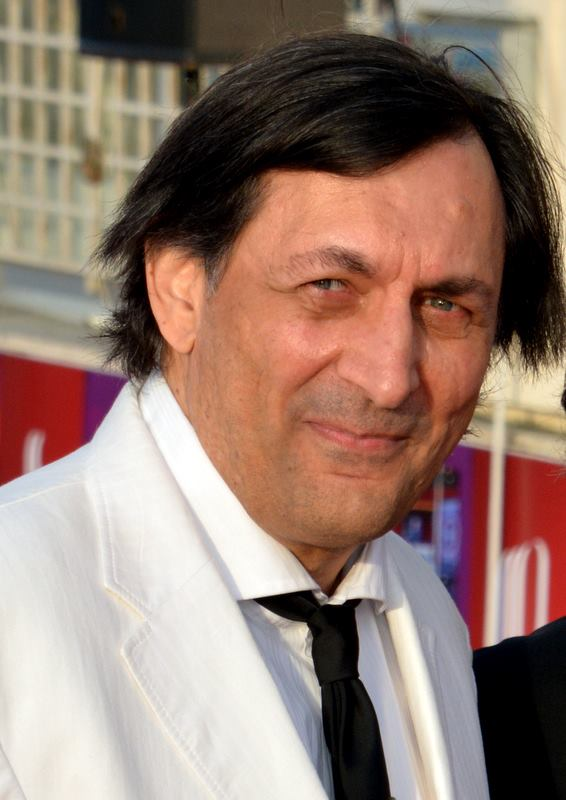
- Serge Riaboukine to the 2015 Cabourg Film Festival
- Born: 29 December 1957 (age 68); Givors, Auvergne-Rhône-Alpes, France
- Occupation: Actor
- Years active: 1973–present

Serge Riaboukine (born 29 December 1957) is a French actor.

== Theatre ==
Year	Title	Author	Director
1973	The Resistible Rise of Arturo Ui	Bertolt Brecht	Jacques Échantillon
1976	The Boors	Carlo Goldoni	Jean-François Rémi
1980	The Marriage of Figaro	Pierre Beaumarchais	Françoise Petit
1980	Scènes de chasse en Bavière	Martin Speer	Jean-Hugues Anglade
1981	En avant	Jérôme Deschamps	Jérôme Deschamps
1983	Hamlet	William Shakespeare	Antoine Vitez
1986	Venice Preserv'd	Thomas Otway	André Engel
1987	L'Excès contraire	Françoise Sagan	Michel Blanc
1993	Le Renard du nord	Noëlle Renaude	Robert Cantarella
1994	The Seven Descents of Myrtle	Tennessee Williams	Catherine Delattres
1995	Brèves de comptoir	Jean-Marie Gourio	Jean-Michel Ribes
2001	Les désirs sauvages de mon mari m'ont presque rendue folle	Éric Civanyan	Éric Civanyan
2006	Dolores Claiborne	David Joss Buckley	Marie-Pascale Osterrieth
2012	Simpatico	Sam Shepard	Didier Long
2014	Salt on Our Skin	Benoîte Groult	Jean-Luc Tardieu
2016	Boucherie rythmique ou l'Homme qui faisait chanter la viande	Valentin de Carbonnières	Valentin de Carbonnières

== Filmography ==
Year	Title	Role	Director	Notes
1980	Les phallocrates		Claude Pierson	
1983	Stag	The man	William Herbert Benskin	Short
1983	L'île bleue	Grégor	Jean-Claude Guidicelli	TV movie
1984	Viva la vie	Barret's assistant	Claude Lelouch	
1984	Ataxie passagère	The man	Luc Pagès	Short
1984	Le roi de la Chine		Fabrice Cazeneuve	TV movie
1984	Manipulations		Marco Pico	TV movie
1987	Buisson ardent	The waiter	Laurent Perrin	
1988	L'excès contraire	Wenceslas	Yves-André Hubert	TV movie
1989	L'enfant de l'hiver	The stage manager	Olivier Assayas	
1989	Forte est la tentation de Georges		Luc Pagès	Short
1989	La danse du scorpion	Morel's assassin	Josée Dayan	TV movie
1989	David Lansky		Hervé Palud	TV series (1 episode)
1990	La Discrète	The waiter	Christian Vincent	
1990	Rendez-vous au tas de sable	Joe	Didier Grousset	
1990	L'annonce	Thibaut	Stéphane Bertin	TV movie
1991	Pin-up et Pénélope	The man	Valérie Malek	Short
1991	Pierre qui roule	The waiter	Marion Vernoux	TV movie
1992	La petite amie d'Antonio	The client	Manuel Poirier	
1993	Le mari de Léon	Léon Yvrard	Jean-Pierre Mocky	
1993	Cible émouvante	Manu	Pierre Salvadori	
1993	Jacques the Fatalist	Jacques	Antoine Douchet	
1993	Panne grasse	The man	Christian Gazio	Short
1994	Bonsoir	Father Bonfils	Jean-Pierre Mocky	
1994	Lonelytude ou une légère éclaircie	The man	Éric Guirado	Short
1995	...à la campagne	Emile	Manuel Poirier	
1995	Les apprentis	The tutor	Pierre Salvadori	
1995	L'année Juliette		Philippe Le Guay	
1995	La vie de Marianne	The coachman	Benoît Jacquot	TV mini-series
1996	Des nouvelles du bon Dieu	Ferdydurke	Didier Le Pêcheur	
1996	Une belle nuit de fête	The gangster	Lionel Epp	Short
1996	La rançon du chien	Ferrand	Peter Kassovitz	TV movie
1996	Le sang du renard	Fernand	Serge Meynard	TV movie
1996	Jamais 2 sans toi	Mr. Petric	Philippe Roussel	TV series (1 episode)
1997	Western	Van Driver	Manuel Poirier	
1997	Marion	Raymond	Manuel Poirier	
1997	Marthe	Lucien	Jean-Loup Hubert	
1997	Just Do It	The man	Frédéric Chèze & Denis Thybaud	Short
1997	Les années lycée : Petites	The male supervisor	Noémie Lvovsky	TV movie
1997	L'esprit des flots	Hurry up	David Delrieux	TV movie
1997	Parisien tête de chien	Georges	Christiane Spiero	TV movie
1998	White Lies	Barnabé	Pierre Salvadori	
1998	L'examen de minuit	Roland Dubois	Danièle Dubroux	
1998	Le danger d'aimer	Luigi	Serge Meynard	TV movie
1998	Les Cordier, juge et flic	Charly	Pierre Sisser	TV series (1 episode)
1999	Skin of Man, Heart of Beast	Francky	Hélène Angel	Locarno International Film Festival - Best Actor
1999	Sachs' Disease	The drunk	Michel Deville	
1999	Les grandes bouches	Jacky	Bernie Bonvoisin	
1999	Voyous voyelles	The locksmith	Serge Meynard	
1999	Jacynthe, tu as un cul de feu	Jo	Philippe Lubliner	Short
1999	Le secret de Saint-Junien	Armand	Christiane Spiero	TV movie
2000	Actors	The motorcycle cop	Bertrand Blier	
2000	Crime Scenes	The priest	Frédéric Schoendoerffer	
2000	Les marchands de sable	Alain	Pierre Salvadori	
2000	Antilles sur Seine	Marin	Pascal Légitimus	
2000	Une femme d'extérieur	Jacques	Christophe Blanc	
2000	Un petit air de fête	The chignole	Éric Guirado	Short
2000	Le détour	Alain	Pierre Salvadori	TV movie
2000	L'avocate	Favelles	Alain Nahum	TV series (1 episode)
2001	Gregoire Moulin vs. Humanity	The taxi driver	Artus de Penguern	
2001	La Tour Montparnasse Infernale	Michel Vignault a.k.a Machin	Charles Nemes	
2001	Ligne 208	René	Bernard Dumont	
2001	Campagnes	Jean-Claude	Olivier Langlois	TV movie
2001	H	The godfather	Éric Lartigau	TV series (1 episode)
2002	Safe Conduct	Louis Née	Bertrand Tavernier	
2002	Mondays in the Sun	Serguei	Fernando León de Aranoa	
2002	24 Hours in the Life of a Woman	Maurice	Laurent Bouhnik	
2002	Les femmes... ou les enfants d'abord...	Martin	Manuel Poirier	
2002	3 zéros	Frédéric Dommange	Fabien Onteniente	
2002	Le chignon d'Olga	Gilles	Jérôme Bonnell	
2002	Femmes de loi	Flamand	Denis Amar	TV series (1 episode)
2003	Time of the Wolf	The leader	Michael Haneke	
2003	Quand tu descendras du ciel	The chignole	Éric Guirado	
2004	Look at Me	Félix	Agnès Jaoui	
2004	The First Time I Turned Twenty	Meyer Goldman	Lorraine Lévy	
2004	Crimson Rivers II: Angels of the Apocalypse	Father Vincent	Olivier Dahan	
2004	Frères	Serge	Xavier De Choudens	
2004	Qui songe à la douceur ?	Monsieur Naud	Isabelle Coudrier-Kleist	Short
2004	Capone	Réno	Jean-Marc Brondolo	TV movie Biarritz International Festival of Audiovisual Programming - Fiction - Actor
2005	Angel-A	Pedro	Luc Besson	
2005	Boudu	Géronimo	Gérard Jugnot	
2005	Les Âmes grises	Bourrache	Yves Angelo	
2005	Les couilles de mon chat	Abel	Didier Bénureau	Short
2005	Gris blanc	Roger	Karim Dridi	TV movie
2005	L'empire du tigre	Servais	Gérard Marx	TV movie
2005	Nuit noire, 17 octobre 1961	Albert Tiercé	Alain Tasma	TV movie
2005	Vénus & Apollon	The man	Olivier Guignard	TV series (1 episode)
2006	Locked Out	Jean-Pierre Lascoumes	Albert Dupontel	
2006	Cabaret Paradis	Wladimir	Corinne & Gilles Benizio	
2006	Girlfriends	Manon's father	Sylvie Ayme	
2006	La leçon de guitare	Michel	Martin Rit	Short; Clermont-Ferrand International Short Film Festival - Special Mention; Lutins du Court-Métrage - Best Actor
2006	La chasse à l'homme (Mesrine)	Jacques Mesrine	Arnaud Sélignac	TV movie
2006	Mentir un peu	Gilbert	Agnès Obadia	TV movie
2006	Marion Jourdan	Barsac	Jean-Marc Seban	TV series (1 episode)
2007	Lino	The mechanic	Jean-Louis Milesi	
2007	Tombé d'une étoile		Xavier Deluc	
2007	Tout est bon dans le cochon		Emma Perret	Short
2007	Monsieur Joseph	Commissioner Boucheron	Olivier Langlois	TV movie
2008	Coluche: l'histoire d'un mec	Éric	Antoine de Caunes	
2008	9mm	Roger	Taylan Barman	
2008	La copie de Coralie	Monsieur Conforme	Nicolas Engel	Short
2008	Elles et Moi	Warrant Rouquette	Bernard Stora	TV mini-series
2009	Little Nicholas	Francis Leborgne	Laurent Tirard	
2009	L'apparition de la Joconde	Frank Brettnacher	François Lunel	
2009	Lady Blood	Pagelli	Jean-Marc Vincent	
2009	Adieu De Gaulle adieu	Jacques Massu	Laurent Herbiet	TV movie
2009	Comme un mauvais souvenir	José	André Chandelle	TV movie
2009	La maîtresse du président	Adolphe Steinheil	Jean-Pierre Sinapi	TV movie
2009	Éternelle	Shakin	Didier Delaître	TV mini-series
2009	R.I.S, police scientifique	Me Kalfan	Alexandre Laurent	TV series (1 episode)
2010	Lights Out	Rabier's father	Fabrice Gobert	
2010	Ornières	Antonin	Daniel Metge	Short
2010	1788... et demi	Father Sauton	Olivier Guignard	TV series (4 episodes)
2010	Les vivants et les morts	Henri	Gérard Mordillat	TV series (8 episodes)
2011	The Invader	Jean-Pierre	Nicolas Provost	
2011	Sleepless Night	José Marciano	Frédéric Jardin	
2011	Jimmy Rivière	José	Teddy Lussi-Modeste	
2011	The Bird	Claude	Yves Caumon	
2011	De force	Colonel Damico	Frank Henry	
2011	L'été des Lip	Giuseppe	Dominique Ladoge	TV movie
2011	Le chant des sirènes	Cuistot	Laurent Herbiet	TV movie
2011	L'épervier	Iron Hand	Stéphane Clavier	TV series (6 episodes)
2012	La mémoire dans la chair	Martineau	Dominique Maillet	
2012	Voyage sans retour	Commissioner Tomasino	François Gérard	
2012	Vilaine fille mauvais garçon	Serge	Justine Triet	Short
2012	La barque	Jacques	Benjamin Untereiner	Short
2012	Quand les poules auront des dents	Alex	Bertrand Van Effenterre	TV movie
2012	La ballade de Kouski	Kouski	Olivier Langlois	TV movie
2012	La main passe	Philippe Chevillon	Thierry Petit	TV movie
2012	Clash	Igor Kazinski	Pascal Lahmani	TV series (1 episode)
2012	Caïn	Lagadec	Bertrand Arthuys	TV series (1 episode)
2013	Ogres niais	Big Balaise	Bernard Blancan	Short
2013	Poussières	M. Rouvière	Daniel Metge	Short
2013	Platane	Serge	Éric Judor & Denis Imbert	TV series (2 episodes)
2014	Ablations	Jean-Michel Poncreux	Arnold de Parscau	
2014	Domnul de la curte	The French	Corneliu Gheorghita	Nominated - Gopo Award for Best Actor in a Leading Role
2014	La clinique du docteur Blanche	Saturnin	Sarah Lévy	TV movie
2015	I'm Dead but I Have Friends	Pierre	Guillaume & Stéphane Malandrin	
2015	J'ai épousé un inconnu	Commander Loison	Serge Meynard	TV movie
2015	Le passager	Commander Solinas	Jérôme Cornuau	TV mini-series
2015	Les Petits Meurtres d'Agatha Christie	Léopold Santini	Eric Woreth	TV series (1 episode)
2016	The First, the Last	The Head Hunters	Bouli Lanners	
2016	La tour 2 contrôle infernale	De Fursac	Éric Judor	
2016	Death by Death	Darek	Xavier Seron	
2016	The law of Pauline	Alain	Philippe Venault	TV movie
2016-2017	Agathe Koltès	Guy Wichniak	Christian Bonnet & Adeline Darraux	TV series (8 episodes)
2017	Racer and the Jailbird	Monsieur Assa	Michaël R. Roskam	
2017	Et mon coeur transparent	Paco	David & Raphaël Vital-Durand	
2017	Le Scénariste	Loubric	François Paquay	Short
2017	La Mante	Sébastien Crozet	Alexandre Laurent	TV mini-series
2018	A Thousand Pieces	Eric Gaubert	Véronique Mériadec	Cyprus International Film Festival - Best Actor in a Leading Role
2018	Section de recherches	Henri Dorval	Julien Zidi	TV series (1 episode)
2018	Kepler(s)		Frédéric Schoendoerffer	TV series Post-Production
2018	Black Spot		Thierry Poiraud	TV series Post-Production
