= Anne Marev =

Belgian actress and writer (1932–2019)

- Born: 1932; Liège, Belgium
- Died: 25 January 2019 (aged 86–87); Uccle, Belgium
- Occupations: Actress; Writer

Anne Marev (1932 – 25 January 2019) was a Belgian actress and writer.

== Biography ==
Marev studied comedy at the Royal Conservatory of Liège, and founded the Théâtre de l'Etuve. She began her career at the Théâtre de Poche and the Théâtre National de la Communauté Française in Brussels. For nearly fifty years, she acted at these two theatres as well as The Public Theater, Infini Théâtre, Théâtre du Méridien, and the Théâtre Compagnie Yvan Baudouin - Lesly Bunton. She was most successful in the play Madame Marguerite at The Public Theater in 1995, directed by Thierry Salmon.

Marev also acted in numerous movies, such as Lendemains qui chantent (1985), The King's Daughters (2000), and Odette Toulemonde (2006).

In television, she played the role of Mira Van Poucke in Season 2 of Septieme Ciel Belgique.

In addition to her acting career, Marev was a journalist for RTBF's cultural program "Charivari" from 1972 to 1975.

Anne Marev died on 25 January 2019 at the age of 86.
