= The Chef (film) =

Like a Chef
- Film poster
- French: Comme un chef
- Directed by: Daniel Cohen
- Written by: Daniel Cohen
- Produced by: Sidonie Dumas
- Starring: Jean Reno; Michaël Youn; Raphaëlle Agogué; Julien Boisselier; Santiago Segura; Salomé Stévenin; Pierre Vernier; Santiago Segura; Geneviève Casile
- Cinematography: Robert Fraisse
- Edited by: Géraldine Rétif
- Music by: Nicola Piovani
- Distributed by: Gaumont
- Release date: 7 March 2012
- Running time: 84 minutes
- Country: France
- Language: French

Le Chef (French: Comme un chef) is a 2012 French comedy film, directed by Daniel Cohen and starring Jean Reno and Michaël Youn. The film had its International premiere at the 62nd Berlin International Film Festival in 2012.

== Plot ==
Jacky Bonnot (Michaël Youn) is a young Frenchman living with his pregnant girlfriend (Raphaëlle Agogué). After being fired from a restaurant, he becomes worried about the birth of his child and decides to get any job he can despite his passion for haute cuisine. After accepting a job as a painter at a home for the elderly, he makes friends with the establishment's cooks and helps them improve their menu. These improvements eventually reach the ears of Alexandre Lagarde (Jean Reno), who is also in a precarious situation: as the renowned chef of the Cargo Lagarde restaurant, he has to improve his entire menu. If he cannot achieve this, the place will lose a star from its rating and Stanislas Matter (Julien Boisselier) will convert it into a molecular kitchen, with Alexandre and all the cooks losing their jobs. Jacky initially rejects the offer to work with Alexandre, because the position is an unpaid internship, but after hesitation, he accepts. The next day, both Jacky and Alexandre start cooking together but as soon as they begin, Jacky's finickiness and Alexandre's stubbornness leads to an argument that results in Jacky being fired.

Alexandre regrets his decision and sends someone to search and take Jacky back to the Cargo Lagarde ranks. They reconcile and start to plan improvements to the restaurant's menu. As Jacky works as an unpaid intern, he lies to his girlfriend about searching for jobs. However, she goes to where he started as a painter and finds herself in the kitchen of the interns, who are having a video call with Jacky. She discovers him lying and their relationship breaks down. Alexandre offers him a glass of wine that Jacky accepts, and they keep tasting bottles of wine until both of them become slightly drunk. Alexandre tells Jacky that food critics that prefer molecular cuisine will be dining soon at his restaurant, and it will result in a loss of one star from his restaurants rating. Jacky, drunk, calls his friend Juan for help. Jacky plans to reconcile with his girlfriend with the help of Alexandre, but the plan fails as she gets mad at his clumsy proposal. Alexandre offers Jacky a room in his house to spend the night, where Alexandre tries to talk with his daughter who is resentful over her dad's indifference to her thesis and degree. Jackie recruits the team of cooks from the home of the elderly to help him and Alexandre in finding a new cuisine. When all efforts fail, they travel in disguise to Cyril restaurant and steal his ingredients. On the day of critic visit Alexandre stays back to help his daughter. Alexandre boss berates Jacky before the staff. Jacky learns from Beatrice she delivered a girl child which motivates him to try something new.

The critics are extremely impressed with combination of traditional and molecular. They consider giving Alexandre 4 stars. Alexandre feels proud about the achievement. He announces Jacky responsible for the success single handedly. Calls him his successor, resigns and gives Jacky his job. Jacky gets a contract, signing amount, owners car. He reunites with his girlfriend. He starts a new show with Alexandre. All his dreams come true.

== Cast ==
- Jean Reno as Alexandre Lagarde, a renowned chef and host of a TV show called "The recipes of Alexandre's market" (Les recettes du Marché d'Alexandre).
- Michaël Youn as Jacky Bonnot, a finicky, clumsy, self-taught cook who dreams of being a great chef like Alexandre.
- Raphaëlle Agogué as Beatrice, Jacky's pregnant girlfriend.
- Julien Boisselier as Stanislas Matter, the tetchy, sarcastic son of Paul Matter, the main shareholder of Cargo Lagarde.
- Santiago Segura as Juan, an outrageous Spaniard who claims to be an expert in molecular cuisine.
- Salomé Stévenin as Amandine, Alexandre's postgraduate daughter.
- Serge Larivière as Titi, chef.
- Issa Doumbia as Moussa, chef.
- Bun Hay Mean as Chang, chef.
- Kentaro as Akio Takenaka, Alexandre's right-hand man.
- Pierre Vernier as Paul Matter, the main shareholder of Cargo Lagarde.
- Rebecca Miquel as Carole, a restaurant owner Alexandre falls in love with.
- Franck de la Personne as Client Cargo
