= Una notte, un sogno =

- Theatrical release poster
- Directed by: Massimo Manuelli
- Written by: Massimo Manuelli
- Produced by: Progetto Visivo
- Starring: Sergio Rubini; Claire Nebout; Hugues Quester; Laura D'Arista
- Cinematography: Giulio Albonico
- Edited by: Luigi Zita
- Music by: Paolo Conte
- Distributed by: Istituto Luce
- Release date: May 4, 1988
- Running time: 83 minutes
- Country: Italy
- Language: Italian

Una notte, un sogno (One night, a dream) is a 1988 Italian comedy film directed by Massimo Manuelli and starring Sergio Rubini.

== Plot ==
Turin, Italy late 1980s. A young woman, bored and disturbed by the behavior of her husband and friends, decide to leave the villa in which he lives to go in the town. On the road she is attacked by a group of young thugs, but a photographer saves her. This man, just before this meeting, he witnessed a crime committed by the Chinese mafia, so he is forced into hiding. Between the two fugitives born solidarity, which soon turned into a feeling. But the short love story, which has as its backdrop the nocturnal environments of Turin, will fade away at dawn to the Porta Nuova train station, on a train leaving for Narvik. The photographer must escape: it is a witness too dangerous. She tries to reunite with him.

== Cast ==
- Sergio Rubini as Bruno
- Claire Nebout as Silvia
- Hugues Quester
- Laura D'Arista
- Rodolfo Traversa
- Pietro Molino
- Quinto Cavallera
- Franco Vaccaro
- John Chen

== Release ==
The film was premiered in Italy in Turin on May 4, 1988

== See also ==
- List of Italian films of 1988
