= Thick Skinned =

1989 film

- Directed by: Patricia Mazuy
- Written by: Patricia Mazuy
- Produced by: Jean-Luc Ormières
- Starring: Sandrine Bonnaire
- Cinematography: Raoul Coutard
- Edited by: Sophie Schmit
- Release date: 31 May 1989
- Running time: 90 minutes
- Country: France
- Language: French

Thick Skinned (French: Peaux de vaches) is a 1989 French drama film directed by Patricia Mazuy. It was screened in the Un Certain Regard section at the 1989 Cannes Film Festival.

== Cast ==
- Sandrine Bonnaire - Annie
- Jean-François Stévenin - Roland
- Jacques Spiesser - Gérard
- Salomé Stévenin - Anna
- Laure Duthilleul - Sophie
- Jean-François Gallotte - Jack Vrel
- Pierre Forget - Armand
- Yann Dedet - Bérino
- Jean-Jacques Bernard - Butcher Riri
