= Like a Star Shining in the Night =

- Directed by: René Féret
- Written by: René Féret
- Produced by: René Féret; Fabienne Camara
- Starring: Salomé Stévenin; Nicolas Giraud
- Cinematography: Benjamín Echazarreta
- Edited by: Fabienne Camara
- Music by: Juan Guillermo Dumay
- Production company: Les Films Alyne
- Distributed by: JML Distribution
- Release date: 3 December 2008
- Running time: 89 minutes
- Country: France
- Language: French

Like a Star Shining in the Night (French: Comme une étoile dans la nuit) is a 2008 French drama film written, produced and directed by René Féret.

== Cast ==
- Salomé Stévenin as Anne
- Nicolas Giraud as Marc
- Jean-François Stévenin as Le père d'Anne
- Marilyne Canto as Dr. Camille Bamberger
- Aurélia Petit as Aurélie
- Guillaume Verdier as Eric
- Sabrina Seyvecou as Sabine
- Yves Reynaud as Le père de Marc
- Claire Stévenin as La mère d'Anne
- Caroline Loeb as La mère de Marc
- Julien Féret as Antoine
- René Féret as Le chef de Marc et Eric
