= Cold Showers =

- Promotional poster
- Directed by: Antony Cordier
- Written by: Antony Cordier; Julie Peyr
- Produced by: Pascal Caucheteux; Sébastien Lemercier
- Starring: Johan Libéreau; Salomé Stévenin
- Cinematography: Nicolas Gaurin
- Edited by: Emmanuelle Castro
- Music by: Nicholas Lemercier
- Production company: Why Not Productions
- Distributed by: BAC Films
- Release date: 22 May 2005
- Running time: 102 minutes
- Country: France
- Language: French
- Budget: $1.9 million
- Box office: $785.000

Cold Showers (French: Douches froides) is a 2005 French drama film directed by Antony Cordier. It was a Directors' Fortnight Selection at 2005 Cannes Film Festival. The film tells the story of three teenagers – Mickaël, Vanessa, and Clément – who face changes and problems over a period of three months as they enter adulthood. The film attracted controversy on its release due to the full-frontal nudity of several young actors.

== Plot ==
Mickaël is from a poor working class family. His father Gérard is a taxi driver who lost his license and job due to drunk driving. His mother Annie works as a janitor in the high school gym. While not an exceptional student, Mickaël excels in judo. His life is focused on the sport, on his judo coach, and on his girlfriend Vanessa. One of Mickaël's teammates, Clément, is from a wealthy family. His father Louis and his mother Mathilde are upper-class. Louis decides to sponsor the judo team. He buys the team uniforms, and asks Mickaël to work with Clément to perfect his technique and prepare the judo team for a French championship.

Mickaël and Clément relate to each other well. While Mickaël is a winning player, Clément is smarter and understands the intrinsic rules of the game better. An incident occurs that forces Mickaël to take the position of a wounded teammate. To do so, he must lose eight kilograms to qualify for the championship team. Mickaël struggles to lose the weight, as he is already in ideal physical condition. This places stress on both Mickaël, his family, and his teammates.

Mickaël and Vanessa include Clément in their camaraderie, a situation which evolves as the three have group sex in the after-hours gym. Vanessa greatly enjoys it, Clément is smitten, and Mickaël has troubling doubts. When the three decide to try it again in a hotel room, Mickaël is so conflicted that he does not join the other two. He only listens, feeling inferior to the smarter, wealthier Clément.

The judo team plays the championship and Mickaël's delicate sense of self worth is restored for a moment. It is the manner in which the trio of teenagers resolve their antics that closes the film.

== Cast ==
- Johan Libéreau as Mickael
- Salomé Stévenin as Vanessa
- Pierre Perrier as Clément
- Florence Thomassin as Annie
- Jean-Philippe Ecoffey as Gérard
- Aurélien Recoing as Louis Steiner
- Claire Nebout as Mathilde Steiner
- Julie Boulanger as Valentine
- Steve Tran as Tranh
- Denis Falgoux as the judo coach
- Magali Woch as Mickael's sister
- Camille Japy as Coach's wife
- Dominique Cabrera as the nurse
- Sarah Pratt as the examiner

== Soundtrack ==
The soundtrack for this film contains songs by Julie Delpy and Galt MacDermot. The score is composed by Nicolas Lemercier. The main song of the film is called "Central Park".

== Awards and nominations ==
César Awards

- Nominated:
  - Best First Film

Prix Louis Delluc

- Won
  - Best First Film

Taipei International Film Festival

- Won:
  - Grand Prize

Verona International Film Festival

- Won:
  - Grand Prize

Marseille Film Festival

- Won:
  - Critic Prize

French Press Golden Star

- Won:
  - Best First Film

French Syndicate of Cinema Critics

- Won:
  - Best Promising Actor - Johan Libéreau

Moulins Film Festival

- Won:
  - Best Actress - Florence Thomassin

La Ciotat Film Festival

- Won:
  - Best Actress - Salomé Stévenin
