= Graziella (2015 film) =

- Directed by: Mehdi Charef
- Written by: Mehdi Charef
- Produced by: Michèle Ray-Gavras
- Starring: Rossy de Palma; Denis Lavant; Claire Nebout
- Cinematography: Giorgos Arvanitis
- Edited by: Yorgos Lamprinos
- Music by: Éric Neveux
- Production companies: K.G. Productions; Canal+ CNC
- Distributed by: K.G. Productions
- Release date: 3 June 2015
- Running time: 99 minutes
- Country: France
- Language: French

Graziella is a 2015 French drama directed by Mehdi Charef.

== Plot ==
He was a projectionist and felt happy to participate in the creation of films. She was a nurse, and dancer in the evening ... With her profile at the Picasso she loved him, but by far not believe it. That was 20 years ago. Another life. Chance and the prison eventually gather pace clocked in A Special Day by Ettore Scola. Under the gaze of Alice, a former prostitute, they end their sentence day Joan of Arc, a large boarding school closed during the autumn holidays, and overnight in adjoining cells in prison. But hell is not the prison, "Sing Sing" as they say, but "the others". Graziella and Antoine are then prepared for the worst challenges to survive.

== Cast ==
- Rossy de Palma as Graziella
- Denis Lavant as Antoine
- Claire Nebout as Alice
- Anne Benoît as The helpful woman
- Philippine Leroy-Beaulieu
- Bruno Lochet
- Astrid Whettnall
- Bruno Paviot
- François Négret
