= Jany Gastaldi =

French actress (1948–2024)

- Born: May 1948; Monaco
- Died: 24 November 2024 (aged 76)
- Occupation: Actress

Jany Gastaldi (May 1948 – 24 November 2024) was a French stage and film actress.

== Life and career ==
Gastaldi was a student of Antoine Vitez at the Conservatoire national supérieur d'art dramatique. As a stage actress Gastaldi worked with Vitez in several plays, including in Andromaque, Les Miracles', Le Misanthrope, Hamlet and Le Soulier de satin. She played in such movies as Solemn Communion, Édith et Marcel and Mina Tannenbaum.

In 1990, she won the Prix du Syndicat de la critique for best actress for her role in Phaedra in Théâtre Gérard-Philipe.

Gastaldi died on 24 November 2024, at the age of 76. French minister of culture Rachida Dati wrote an obituary after her death.
