= The Man Who Wasn't There (1987 film) =

- Directed by: René Féret
- Written by: René Féret, based on the novel The Man Who Wasn't There by Roderick MacLeish
- Produced by: Jean-Pierre Rassam
- Starring: René Féret; Claude Jade; Valérie Stroh; Georges Descrières
- Cinematography: Alain Levent
- Music by: René Urtreger
- Distributed by: F. Distribution Associée
- Release date: 6 May 1987
- Running time: 90 minutes
- Country: France
- Language: French

The Man Who Wasn't There (French: L'Homme qui n'était pas là) is a 1987 French thriller film directed by René Féret and based on Roderick MacLeish's novel The Man Who Wasn't There.

== Plot ==
Charles Elaine goes from strength to strength. A famous actor, his career is progressing smoothly with the advice of Strosser and daughter Isabelle, his lawyers. But someone in the shadows wants to lead him to loss, madness and crime, by applying the theories of a psychiatrist who proposed that deft manipulation "can make anyone crazy".

False rumors, strange coincidences, terminated contracts, and the beautiful Rella, who attracts and refuses him, all add to Charles' mounting worries. He soon is appearing again in the lead role of Macbeth, a tragedy that obsesses him, ever since witnessing the fatal fall of his father from the cliffs of Cassis as a child. Staged allusions come and go, persuading him that he was responsible for his father's death. Just who is responsible for the manipulation of Charles – Alice, his sister? Or Alexander, his stepfather / Alice's father?

== Cast ==
- René Féret as Charles
- Claude Jade as Alice
- Valérie Stroh as Rella
- Georges Descrières as Alexandre
- Jacques Dufilho as Strosser
- Sabine Haudepin as Isabelle Strosser
