= Massimo Fagioli =

Italian psychiatrist and film director (1931–2017)

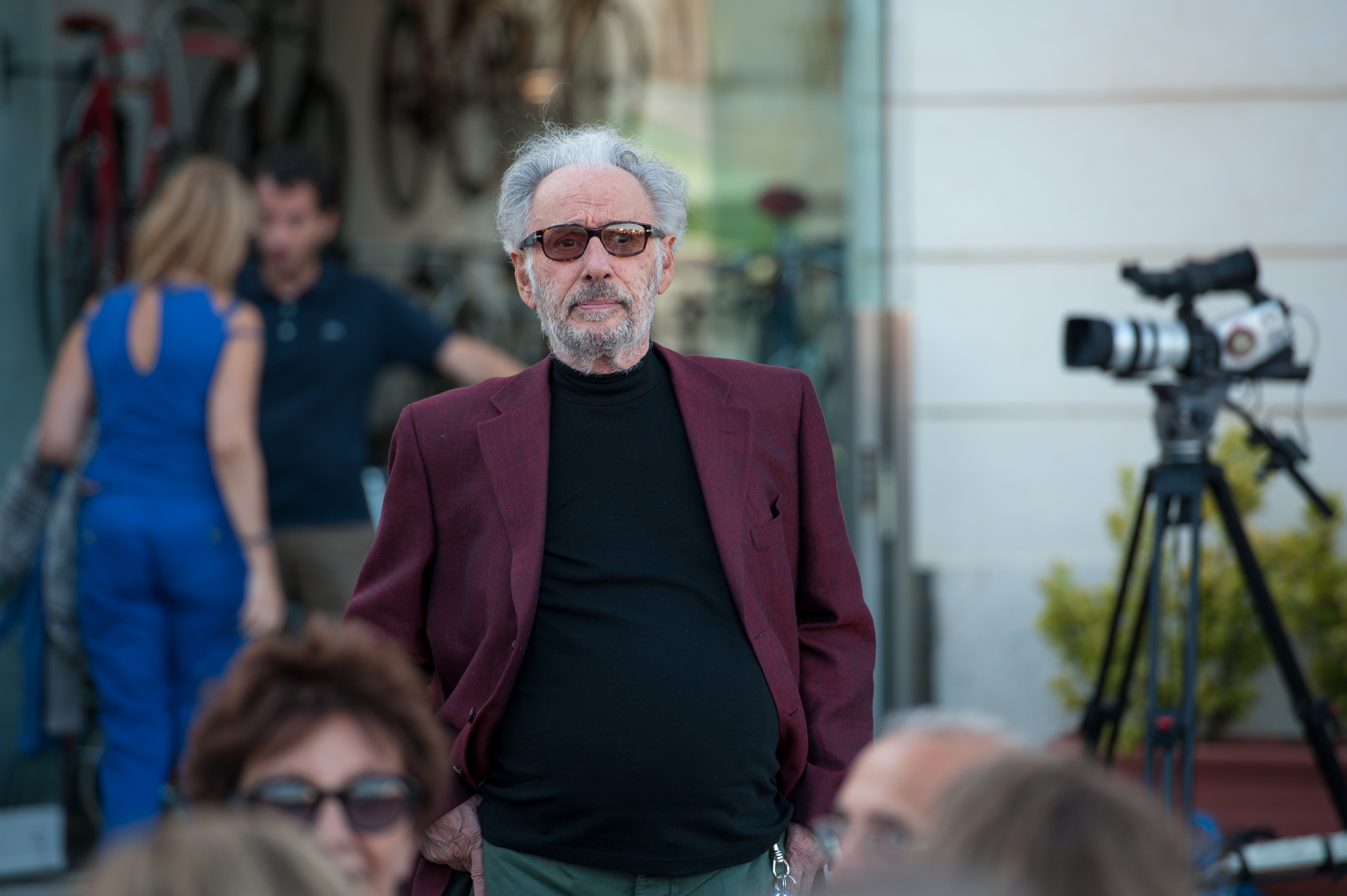
- Born: Massimo Fagioli; 19 May 1931; Monte Giberto, Italy
- Died: 17 February 2017 (aged 85); Rome, Italy
- Scientific career
- Fields: Psychiatry, psychotherapy

Massimo Fagioli (Monte Giberto, 19 May 1931 - Rome, 13 February 2017) was an Italian psychiatrist and psychotherapist. He is best known for his “Human Birth Theory” which aims to define the roots and causes of mental illness in order to propose a structure for diagnosis and psychotherapeutic cure. Fagioli drew his theory from a theoretical framework that encompasses both the physiology of birth and the beginning of human thought. He is also known for the “Analisi Collettiva”, a form of psychotherapeutic group practice that he ran continuously for more than 40 years between January 1975 and December 2016. His medical theory and practice represent the core of “Il sogno della farfalla” psychiatric periodical.

== Biography ==
Fagioli was born on 19 May 1931 in Monte Giberto, a commune situated near Fermo, Marche. During the World War II he was a partisan runner, fighting on the battlefield alongside his father, a medical doctor and surgeon. He graduated in medicine and surgery in Rome in 1956 and then specialised in Neuropsychiatry in Modena. He died on 13 February 2017.

=== Medical career ===
In 1957 Fagioli worked at psychiatric hospitals in Venice, where he was soon disappointed by the organicist practice, a methodology directly inherited from 19th century psychiatry. In 1960 he decided to move to Padua, where he studied and worked with Ferdinando Barison, one of the most important psychiatrists of that time. By “breaking down the ward’s wall” and living with his patients, Fagioli found a new approach. In 1963 he led a psychotherapeutic community at Ludwig's Binswanger's clinic Bellevue in Kreuzlingen, Switzerland. The hospital was then directed by Binswanger's homonymous nephew, father of the existential therapy.

After gaining experience in the public sector, Fagioli moved to Rome and started his own private psychotherapeutic practice. Building on many theoretical and empirical studies, Fagioli's 1962 paper “Some notes on paranoid and schizophrenic delusional perception” ("Alcune note sulla percezione delirante paranoicale e schizofrenica") introduced the first results of his research. A decade later he would then publish the first volume of his theoretical work, “Death Instinct and Knowledge” ("Istinto di Morte e Conoscenza"). Typewritten copies of this book started circulating at the end of the 1970. Because of its theoretical propositions which were in stark opposition to the psychoanalytic orthodoxy, Massimo Fagioli was expelled from the Italian Psychoanalytic Society (Società Psicoanalitica Italiana). “Death Instinct and Knowledge” and the following books “The Puppet and the Marionette” ("La Marionetta e il Burattino") and “Human Birth Theory and Human Castration” ("Teoria della Nascita e Castrazione Umana") constitute a theoretical trilogy of what he would then call “The Human Birth Theory”.

=== The beginning of the Analisi Collettiva ===
In 1975 Fagioli was appointed supervisor of a psychiatrists’ group, on behalf of the Institute of Psychiatry at the University of Rome, La Sapienza. During these sessions, an ever-increasing number of people started joining in. Some participants worked in the psychiatric field while others came from different backgrounds such as extra-parliamentary left-wing movements, but also from the working class and Rome's artistic scene. From the initial session set at once per week, Fagioli increased the number up to four. This change marked the beginning of what became known as the Analisi Collettiva. Since its early years, this form of psychotherapeutic group drew the attention of the media, due in particular to Fagioli harsh criticism towards Sigmund Freud.

Free access and participants’ anonymity were the most important features of this psychotherapeutic practice. Fagioli was not interested in the patient's social identity but rather in the human dynamic that could arise in the rapport during the group-analytic setting. After the first few years, the director of the Sapienza Psychiatry Institute, Giancarlo Reda, asked Fagioli to end the sessions. In response to this command, in November 1980 Fagioli decided to leave the university and carry on the Analisi Collettiva sessions in his own private studio in Via di Roma Libera 23, in the Roman neighbourhood Trastevere. In the same year, a book based on an interview with Fagioli, “Child, Woman and Man’s Transformation” ("Bambino, donna e trasformazione dell'uomo") was published.

=== Cinema, architecture and sculpture ===
During the first years of the Analisi Collettiva, Fagioli collaborated with the Italian film director Marco Bellocchio. From the second half of the 1980s onwards, they worked together on the films Devil in the Flesh (1986), The Conviction (1991) and The Butterfly’s Dream (1994). Their first work, Devil in the Flesh, which harshly criticised left-wing ideas, received a critical reception. Fagioli was in fact accused of manipulating Bellocchio during the making of the film. However, Bellocchio always denied these accusations. A few years later, The Conviction became a subject of great controversy, being defined by the media as an apology of rape, but both Fagioli and Bellocchio responded in defence of their work. Despite this, the film was awarded the Silver Bear at the Berlinale in 1991. After these three works, Bellocchio went on taking part in the Analisi Collettiva, while working on new projects.

In addition to his work with Marco Bellocchio, in 1997 Massimo Fagioli wrote, directed and produced the soundtrack of the film Il cielo della luna. The film was presented at the Locarno Film Festival, while his second work, the documentary “Does psychiatry exist?” was screened at Farnese Cinema in Rome in 2003.

Fagioli's artistic work also includes sculpture and architecture. In 2005 he designed the “Blue Sculpture”, that was exhibited at the Faculty of Oriental Studies at the University of Rome La Sapienza. As an architect he produced the “Palazzetto Bianco” in collaboration with the architects Paola Rossi and Francoise Bliek. This project appeared in different volumes of selected works such as “Rome’s Wonders: from the Renaissance to the present day” ("Le meraviglie di Roma: dal Rinascimento ai giorni nostri") realised by Vittorio Sgarbi. However, amongst his architectural projects, “The Fountain” ("La Fontana"), built in Largo Ettore Rolli for the neighbourhood urban renewal, gained less recognition. Due to the lack of maintenance required for water monuments, the fountain was criticised by some experts - among them the art critic Vittorio Sgarbi himself and some of the area's inhabitants.

=== Politics ===
Over the years, Fagioli was actively involved in the political scene, collaborating with many left-wing political supporters, newspapers and periodicals. His political activity was mainly intellectual, aiming to propose a new cultural and anthropological perspective for the left. His views led him to face conflicts and inevitable clashes with political exponents. In 1975 he gave a lecture on Das Kapital by Karl Marx at the University of Siena, whilst between the years 1979 and 1981 he collaborated both with the Italian Communist Party and with Lotta Continua newspaper.

Fagioli is the author of a large number of articles addressed and published on Lotta Continua. All the articles were subsequently collected in the periodical “Il sogno della Farfalla”. Towards the end of the 1990s and the first decade of the 2000s he was involved in political debates with Fausto Bertinotti, the secretary of the Communist Refoundation Party. Later on, Fagioli came in touch with the Italian Radical Party, through the periodical Quaderni Radicali and more specifically and personally with Marco Pannella and Emma Bonino.

=== University Research and the Publishing House ===
From 2002 to 2012 he gave lectures at the Gabriele D’Annunzio University of Chieti-Pescara. From 2006 until 25 February 2017 he wrote a weekly column for the Left periodical (the articles that appeared on 17th and 25 February were published posthumously). On 30 October and 6 November 2015 a two-day conference took place in the lecture hall of the La Sapienza University of Rome to celebrate the Analisi Collettiva 40th anniversary; the conference's talks were then collected and published by the publishing house L’Asino d’Oro.

== The Human Birth Theory ==
After the publication of various articles, the Human Birth Theory was systematised in the theoretical trilogy constituted by “Death Instinct and Knowledge”(1971),“ The Marionette and the Puppet” (1974), “Human Birth Theory and Human castration” (1975).

=== Light-retina interaction, annulment pulsion, disappearance fantasy ===
The Human Birth Theory states that the foetus and the newborn are two different beings. During the foetus’ passage from the dark intrauterine environment to the light of the external world, a retinal photo-stimulation determines the activation of the brain. The paper “Conical intersection dynamics of the primary photoisomerization event in vision” published in Nature in 2010 highlighted that retinal-light contact triggers a specific chemical-brain reaction. This phenomenon is particularly observed and evident in the first instants of life. The Human Birth Theory states that the beginning of human life is determined by the light-brain interaction rather than by the air-lungs interaction, as affirmed by medical science.

In regards to this point, Fagioli observed the newborn physical condition in the first instants of life; a span of time around 20 seconds long when the baby is not breathing, the body has no muscle tensions and has apparently no reaction towards the external environment. Drawing from this observation, Fagioli hypothesized that the only human activity occurring at birth is a mental activity. One of the questions that Fagioli aimed to define in the Human Birth Theory is the one concerning the physiology of mind.

In his first theoretical book, Fagioli stated that in the passage from a dark and warm condition into the coldness of the external world, light is the “absolutely new stimuli”. Fagioli observed that newborns are completely inept at birth thus the external environment would be lethal for them without the intervention of adults. Therefore, the inanimate and aggressive external world is made mentally “disappear”; it is indeed annulled by the newborn. This first reaction of the mind occurring at birth is defined by Fagioli "annulment pulsion". Through this, the newborn makes both the inanimate environment and itself disappear. Fagioli postulated that light stimulation determines simultaneously the beginning of human thought activity and the emergence of what he formulated as the annulment pulsion of the non-material world. This pulsion is directed against non-material reality.

According to this theory, the annulment pulsion induces the change of the capability to react into vitality, a specie-specific human characteristic. Fagioli considered vitality as a biological sensitivity developed by the foetus during the last weeks of pregnancy. The fusion between the annulment pulsion and vitality induces the onset of the capability to imagine, which determines the appearance of a first mental image. From the sensation of the skin in contact with the amniotic fluid the newborn creates the image of the existence of another human being. The Human Birth Theory affirms that at birth, the experience in the previous intrauterine condition is turned into an internal image, a memory-fantasy of the sensation had before. Through the memory of body physiology the newborn realizes its own existence and the hope-certainty of an existent breast. This allows the relationship with another human being, moving the newborn to look for nourishment and human affection. In his book "Death Instinct and Knowledge" this complex dynamic is expressed using the terms “disappearance fantasy”, a syntagm that summarises his research on human birth, as Fagioli stated in the article “Twenty-one words that did not exist before” published on Left.

In this same article, Fagioli developed a new line of research. He proposed a formula able to describe and coherently embody the dynamic of human birth, human thinking and its further development. The resulting sequence is made of the following word: reaction, pulsion, vitality, creation, existence, time, capability to imagine, force, movement, sound, memory, hope-certainty of an existent breast, conscious perception, fantasy, line, sense, visage. The theoretical articulation that Fagioli expressed in these twenty-one words does not compromise his original theorisation. Whilst the Human Birth Theory, elaborated in the book "Death Instinct and Knowledge", aimed to determine the beginning of human thinking, with these twenty-one words Fagioli questioned how human thought emerges and what its development path in the first year of life consists of.

=== Negation, mental pathologies and dream interpretation ===
According to Fagioli, the annulment pulsion is fundamental to explain the onset of mental illness. He stated that a deficiency or lack of affection in the mother-newborn relationship between breast-feeding and weaning, can determine a shift of the annulment pulsion towards the external world to an annulment pulsion towards human beings. This is what he defined in the Italian language as “anafettività”. For Fagioli, the very first years of life, when there is still no conscience nor verbal thought, represent the so-called non-conscious. Throughout his life, Fagioli fought against the idea that the non-conscious dimension is unknowable.

The end of the first stage of life, in which the mother-newborn relationship is central, represents the beginning of a second fundamental stage. The baby will either realize its own autonomy or on the contrary, this moment will determine the conditions for the onset of postnatal factors of illness. Fagioli thought that the possibility to cure mental illness is achievable only by knowing, interpreting and overcoming non-conscious dynamics experienced in “pathological” human relationships. According to his theorization, the aim of the psychotherapeutic practice is to recreate the physiological disappearance fantasy; that is to say, the first moments of life. He stated that the physiology of the mind is rooted in the ability to separate one's inner dimensions from previous type of object-relations without acting on them.

One of the main points of Fagioli's therapeutic praxis is the interpretation of dreams, which descends directly from the Human Birth Theory. According to this, dreams and the first months and years of life are considered as non-conscious language or in other words thoughts expressed through images (on the contrary, Freud affirmed that dreams are a daily residual, hallucinatory satisfaction of desire). Fagioli refused the common belief that the unconscious dimension is naturally ill or animalistic. This belief can be found in the Freudian Es, a phylogenetic heritage criticized by Fagioli as a restatement of the Original Sin, codified by the Judeo-Christian-Islamic tradition.

Fagioli claimed that the possibility of curing mental illness through the interpretation of dreams becomes possible only if a non-conscious dynamic is discovered. This dynamic has been defined by Fagioli as negation, a form of reality alteration that is expressed through oniric images. He stated that the psychotherapist's interpretation of negation can prevent the worsening of mental illness and avoid the development of the patient's alteration of reality into conscious mental disorder, that can result in full-blown mental disease.

He stated that if this alteration is expressed on a conscious level, it can be curable only through a psychotherapy founded on three fundamental points : setting, transfer and interpretation. The concept of negation radically differs from the one proposed by Freud. For the latter, negation is a dimension affecting only the conscious thought. Moreover, Fagioli's conception of negation stands in stark opposition to the Freudian concept of remotion which aimed at bringing into consciousness what had been previously “moved” into another area of the mind. Fagioli's interpretation of dreams has no connection with the correspondent psychoanalytic proposition.

== Works ==
=== Books ===
- Istinto di morte e conoscenza: pensieri di psicoanalisi, Roma, A. Armando, 1972; later Istinto di morte e conoscenza, Roma, L'Asino D'Oro, 2010, 2017. ISBN 978-88-6443-015-7 (German edition, Todestrieb und Erkenntnis, Frankfurt, Stroemfeld, 2011. ISBN 978-38-6600-076-6; English Edition, Death instinct and knowledge, L'Asino D'Oro edizioni, Rome, 2019. ISBN 9788864430188)
- La marionetta e il burattino, Roma, A.Armando, 1974; Roma, L'Asino D'Oro, 2011. ISBN 978-88-6443-002-7
- Psicoanalisi della nascita e castrazione umana, Roma, A. Armando, 1975; later Teoria della nascita e castrazione umana, Roma, L'Asino D'Oro, 2012. ISBN 978-88-6443-003-4
- Bambino, donna e trasformazione dell'uomo, Roma, Nuove Edizioni Romane, 1980; Roma, L'Asino D'Oro, 2013. ISBN 978-88-6443-004-1

=== Lectures ===
- Storia di una ricerca. Lezioni 2002, L'Asino d'oro edizioni, Rome, 2018. ISBN 978-88-6443-005-8
- Das Unbewusste. Lezioni 2003, Roma, Nuove Edizioni Romane, 2007. ISBN 978-88-7457-051-5
- Una vita irrazionale. Lezioni 2006, Roma, Nuove Edizioni Romane, 2006-2007. ISBN 978-88-7457-042-3
- Fantasia di sparizione. Lezioni 2007, L'Asino d'oro edizioni, Rome, 2009. ISBN 978-88-6443-008-9
- Il pensiero nuovo. Lezioni 2004, L'Asino d'oro edizioni, Rome, 2011. ISBN 978-88-6443-009-6
- L'uomo nel cortile. Lezioni 2005, L'Asino d'oro edizioni, Rome, 2012. ISBN 978-88-6443-010-2
- Settimo anno. Lezioni 2008, L'Asino d'oro edizioni, Rome, 2013. ISBN 978-88-6443-011-9
- Religione, Ragione e Libertà. Lezioni 2009, L'Asino d'oro edizioni, Rome, 2014. ISBN 978-88-6443-012-6
- L'idea della nascita umana. Lezioni 2010, L'Asino d'oro edizioni, Rome, 2015. ISBN 978-88-6443-013-3
- Materia energia pensiero. Lezioni 2011, L'Asino d'oro edizioni, Rome, 2016. ISBN 978-88-6443-014-0
- Conoscenza dell’istinto di morte. Lezioni 2012, L'Asino d'oro edizioni, Rome, 2017. ISBN 978-88-6443-016-4

=== Collections of articles appeared on the Left periodical ===
- Left 2006, L'Asino d'oro edizioni, Rome, 2009. ISBN 978-88-6443-025-6
- Left 2007, L'Asino d'oro edizioni, Rome, 2010. ISBN 978-88-6443-026-3
- Left 2008, L'Asino d'oro edizioni, Rome, 2011. ISBN 978-88-6443-027-0
- Left 2009, L'Asino d'oro edizioni, Rome, 2012. ISBN 978-88-6443-028-7
- Left 2010, L'Asino d'oro edizioni, Rome, 2013. ISBN 978-88-6443-029-4
- Left 2011, L'Asino d'oro edizioni, Rome, 2014. ISBN 978-88-6443-030-0
- Left 2012, L'Asino d'oro edizioni, Rome, 2015. ISBN 978-88-6443-031-7
- Left 2013, L'Asino d'oro edizioni, Rome, 2016. ISBN 978-88-6443-032-4
- Left 2014, L'Asino d'oro edizioni, Rome, 2017. ISBN 978-88-6443-033-1
- Left 2015, L'Asino d'oro edizioni, Rome, 2018. ISBN 978-88-6443-034-8
- Left 2016 - 2017, L'Asino d'oro edizioni, Rome, 2020. ISBN 978-88-6443-521-3

=== Papers and other ===
- Alcune note sulla percezione delirante, paranoicale e schizofrenica, in “Archivio di psicologia, neurologia e psichiatria”, anno XXIII, 1962. Republished in “Il sogno della farfalla”, n.3, L'Asino d'oro edizioni, Rome 2009.
- Psicosi epilettiche croniche e sindromi pseudoschizofreniche, in “Annali di freniatria e scienze affini”, ottobre-dicembre,1962.
- L’integrazione collettiva del lavoro psicoterapeutico dei medici in ospedale psichiatrico. Insulinoterapia e psicoterapia di gruppo, with Novello E., in “Minerva Medico-Psicologica”, vol. 3, n.4, 1963.
- Insulinoterapia e psicoterapia di gruppo. Valore psicoterapeutico del “senso della schizofrenicità, in “Archivio di psicologia, neurologia e psichiatria”, anno XXIV, 1963. Republished in “Il sogno della farfalla”, n.1, L'Asino d'oro edizioni, Rome 2010.
- Due saggi di psicologia dinamica, Roma, Romagrafik, 1974.
- Introduzione a René Arpad Spitz, Il no e il sì: saggio sulla genesi della comunicazione umana, Roma, A.Armando, 1975.
- Biancaneve e i sette anni, in “Psicoterapia e scienze umane”, ottobre-dicembre, 1979.
- Realtà umana dell’artista e opera d’arte, in “Il sogno della farfalla”, n.4, L'Asino d'oro edizioni, Rome 2001.
- Intervista a Radio Città, in “Il sogno della farfalla”, n.4, L'Asino d'oro edizioni, Rome 2001.
- Possibilità e realtà di un lavoro psichico di realizzazione, trasformazione e sviluppo, in “Il sogno della farfalla”, n.4, L'Asino d'oro edizioni, Rome 2001.
- Una depressione, in "Il sogno della farfalla", n.2, L'Asino d'oro edizioni, Rome 2002.
- Functional maturation of neocortex: a base of viability, with Maria Gabriella Gatti e altri, in “The journal of maternal-fetal & neonatal medicine: the official journal of the European Association of Perinatal Medicine, the Federation of Asia and Oceania Perinatal Societies, the International Society of Perinatal Obstetricians”, Suppl 1:101-3, 2012.
- Maturazione funzionale della neocorteccia, with Maria Gabriella Gatti, in “Il sogno della farfalla”, n.1, L'Asino d'oro edizioni, Rome 2013.
- La psichiatria come psicoterapia, in "Il sogno della farfalla", n.4, L'Asino d'oro edizioni, Rome 2013.
- Poesia, L'Asino d'oro edizioni, Rome 2018. ISBN 978-88-6443-017-1
- Una depressione, L'Asino d'oro edizioni, Rome 2020. ISBN 978-88-6443-552-7

== Bibliography ==
- AA.VV., Critica e storia dell’istituzione psicoanalitica, Roma, Pensiero Scientifico, 1978. ISBN 978-88-7002-013-7
- Giuseppe Di Chiara, Itinerari della psicoanalisi, Torino, Loescher, 1982. ISBN 978-88-2012-940-8
- Silvia Vegetti Finzi, Storia della psicoanalisi 1895 – 1990. Autori, opere, teorie, Milano, Mondadori, 1996. ISBN 978-88-0433-739-3
- David Michel, La psicoanalisi nella cultura italiana, Torino, Bollati Boringhieri, 1999. ISBN 978-88-3390-567-9
- Gioia Roccioletti, Marzia Fabi, Silvia Colangelo, Paola Centofanti, Psicologia dinamica - Una introduzione, Milano, McGraw-Hill, 2006. ISBN 978-88-3866-409-0
- Daniela Colamedici, Andrea Masini, Gioia Roccioletti, La medicina della mente. Storia e metodo della psicoterapia di gruppo, L'Asino d'oro edizioni, Rome, 2011. ISBN 978-88-6443-057-7
- Mariopaolo Dario, Giovanni Del Missier, Ester Stocco, Luana Testa, Psichiatria e psicoterapia in Italia dall'Unità ad oggi, L'Asino d'oro edizioni, Rome, 2016. ISBN 978-88-6443-341-7
- A Mazzetta et al, From delusional perception to annulment drive (1962–1971), in European Psychiatry
- I Calesini, Fagioli's human birth theory and the possibility to cure mental illness, in International Journal of Environment and Health, vol 8, n 3, 2017
- I Calesini, Physiology of Human Birth and Mental Disease, in Simon George Taukeni, Psychology of Health - Biopsychosocial Approach, IntechOpen
- M G Gatti, E Beccucci, F Fargnoli, M Fagioli M, U Ådén, G Buonumore, Functional maturation of neocortex: a base of viability, in The journal of maternal-fetal & neonatal medicine: the official journal of the European Association of Perinatal Medicine, the Federation of Asia and Oceania Perinatal Societies, the International Society of Perinatal Obstetricians
- S Maccari et al., Early-life experiences and the development of adult diseases with a focus on mental illness: The Human Birth Theory, in Neuroscience, 2017 Feb 7;342:232-251
- E Gebhardt et al, Schizophrenic autism as an expression of “annulment drive” related to the loss of the original vitality, in European Psychiatry
- D Polese et al, Neuropsychophysiology knowledge by fagioli's human birth theory can achieve the psychosis psychotherapy treatment, in European Psychiatry
- E Atzori, Psychopathological Effects of Psychostimulant Substances and Psychotic Onset: the Difficult Process of Differential Diagnosis Between Substance-induced Psychosis and Acute Primary Psychosis, in European Psychiatry
- L Giorgini et al, I Say “no”. You Say “it Isn't”. About a New Understanding of the Concept of Negation, in European Psychiatry
