= Anton Tchékhov 1890 =

- Film poster
- Directed by: René Féret
- Written by: René Féret
- Produced by: René Féret; Fabienne Féret
- Starring: Nicolas Giraud; Lolita Chammah; Robinson Stévenin; Jacques Bonnaffé; Jenna Thiam
- Cinematography: Lucas Bernard
- Edited by: Fabienne Féret
- Music by: Marie-Jeanne Serero
- Production company: Les Films Alyne
- Distributed by: JML Distribution
- Release dates: 24 January 2015 (Angers European First Film Festival); 18 March 2015
- Running time: 96 minutes
- Country: France
- Language: French
- Budget: $1.2 million
- Box office: $275.000

Anton Tchékhov 1890 is a 2015 French biographical drama film written, directed and produced by René Féret. It stars Nicolas Giraud as the title character, Anton Chekhov. It was released on 18 March 2015, just weeks before Féret's death in April 2015.

== Cast ==
- Nicolas Giraud as Anton Chekhov
- Lolita Chammah as Macha Chekhova
- Robinson Stévenin as Kolia Chekhov
- Jacques Bonnaffé as Souvorine
- Jenna Thiam as Lika Mizinova
- Brontis Jodorowsky as Alexandre Chekhov
- Marie Féret as Anna
- Alexandre Zeff as Isaac
- Philippe Nahon as Grigorovitch
- Frédéric Pierrot as Leo Tolstoy
- Guy Cisterne as Anton's father
- Michelle L'Aminot as Anton's mother
- Albert Delpy as The governor
