= Mozart's Sister =

- Film poster
- Directed by: René Féret
- Written by: René Féret
- Produced by: René Féret; Fabienne Féret
- Starring: Marie Féret
- Cinematography: Benjamín Echazarreta
- Edited by: Fabienne Féret
- Music by: Marie-Jeanne Serrero
- Production company: Les Films Alyne
- Distributed by: JML Productions
- Release date: 10 June 2010
- Running time: 120 minutes
- Country: France
- Language: French
- Budget: $4.5 million (€3.4 million)
- Box office: $839,654

Mozart's Sister (French title: Nannerl, la sœur de Mozart) is a 2010 French drama film written and directed by René Féret, and starring two of his daughters. It presents a fictional account of the early life of Maria Anna Mozart, nicknamed Nannerl, who was the sister of Wolfgang Amadeus Mozart and his only sibling to survive infancy.

== Plot ==
During the Mozart family grand tour, a cracked carriage axle forces Leopold Mozart, his wife Anna, 14-year-old Nannerl and a rambunctious 11-year-old Wolfgang to seek shelter in the nearby Fontevraud Abbey. There Nannerl develops a friendship with 13-year-old Princess Louise of France, who is being brought up in the Abbey, along with two of her sisters. This leads to an encounter at Versailles with her brother, Louis, Dauphin of France. Nannerl, an accomplished harpsichordist and singer who helps support the family as part of a brother/sister act, yearns to compose music and play violin, but her father, Leopold, forbids it. The young, but recently widowed Dauphin takes an interest in her and her music that edges toward romance. But he breaks off the relationship when he becomes engaged to Maria Josepha of Saxony, Dauphine of France. Princess Louise enters a convent and urges Nannerl to stay away from the Dauphin who is struggling to avoid the debauchery of his father, King Louis XV. A bizarre final encounter with the Dauphin and his new wife ensues. Nannerl and Princess Louise reflect on how their fates would have differed had they been born male.

== Cast ==
- Marie Féret as Nannerl Mozart
- Marc Barbé as Leopold Mozart
- Delphine Chuillot as Anna Maria Mozart
- David Moreau as Wolfgang Mozart
- Clovis Fouin as Le Dauphin
- Lisa Féret as Louise de France
- Adèle Leprêtre as Victoire de France
- Dominique Marcas as Abbess
- Salomé Stévenin as Isabelle d'Aubusson
- Nicolas Giraud as Master of Music at Versailles

== Reception ==
Mozart's Sister received generally positive reviews, holding a 75% rating on Rotten Tomatoes. On Metacritic, which uses an average of critics' reviews, the film has 71/100, indicating "generally favorable reviews".

== Home video ==
In the United States, Mozart's Sister was released on DVD and Blu-ray Disc by Music Box Films. Each DVD and Blu-ray Disc includes a music CD with the film's soundtrack, composed by Marie-Jeanna Serero. The music CD's tracks are:

1. Le Voyage
2. Louise de France
3. Concert a l'abbaye
4. Le livre maudit
5. Tendresse
6. Le Violon du Dauphin
7. Le Do Magique
8. Versailles
9. Le Voyage
10. La Gifle
11. Chant Versailles
12. Improvisation
13. Dauphin Lettre 1
14. La Mer
15. Nannerl compose
16. Concert Nannerl – 1st movement
17. Concert Nannerl – 2nd movement
18. Concert Nannerl – 3rd movement
19. Dauphin Lettre 2
20. Comptine Leopold
21. Le Catafalque
22. Dernier repas
23. Nannerl brule ses partitions
24. Generique de fin
