= Tea in the Harem =

1985 film

- Film poster
- Directed by: Mehdi Charef
- Screenplay by: Mehdi Charef
- Based on: Le thé au harem d'Archi Ahmed by Mehdi Charef
- Produced by: Costa-Gavras; Michèle Ray-Gavras
- Starring: Rémi Martin; Kader Boukhanef
- Cinematography: Dominique Chapuis
- Edited by: Kenout Peltier
- Release date: 30 April 1985
- Running time: 110 minutes
- Country: France
- Language: French
- Box office: $3.9 million

Tea in the Harem (French: Le Thé au harem d'Archimède) (Note: The French title is a mondegreen for Le theoreme d'Archimède, "Archimedes' theoreme") is a 1985 film directed by Mehdi Charef, based on a book written by Charef in 1983. It was screened in the Un Certain Regard section at the 1985 Cannes Film Festival. The film won the Prix Jean Vigo in 1985.

== Cast ==
- Kader Boukhanef - Madjid
- Rémi Martin - Pat
- Laure Duthilleul - Josette
- Saïda Bekkouche - Malika
- Nicole Hiss - Solange
- Brahim Ghenaim - The father
- Nathalie Jadot - Chantal
- Frédéric Ayivi - Bengston
- Pascal Dewaeme - Thierry
- Albert Delpy - Pelletier
- Sandrine Dumas - Anita
- Bourlem Guerdjou - Bibiche
- Jean-Pierre Sobeaux - Jean-Marc
- Nicolas Wostrikoff - Stéphane

== Plot ==
This chronicle of life in a Parisian housing project in the 1980s features Madjid, the son of immigrants and the eldest of a large family entirely supported by his mother, and his best friend Pat. After a realistic setup, the film shifts into a dreamlike state before returning to reality with several powerful, almost melodramatic scenes.
