= The Story of Paul =

- Directed by: René Féret
- Written by: René Féret
- Starring: Paul Allio
- Cinematography: Nurith Aviv
- Edited by: Vincent Pinel
- Production companies: Les Films du 20ème Les Films Arquebuse
- Distributed by: La Clef Distribution
- Release date: 15 October 1975
- Running time: 81 minutes
- Country: France
- Language: French

The Story of Paul (French: Histoire de Paul) is a 1975 French drama film written and directed by René Féret. The film follows a man named Paul, who is institutionalised after a suicide attempt. The film won the Prix Jean Vigo in 1975.

== Cast ==
- Paul Allio as Paul
- Jean Benguigui as The Italian
- Bernard Bloch as the harmonica man
- Gildas Bourdet as the intern
- Isabelle Caillard as Brigitte
- Florence Camarroque as the psychologist
- Philippe Clévenot as the amnesiac man
- Jean-Louis Jacopin as Bertrand
