= Nelly (2004 film) =

2004 film

- Theatrical release poster
- Directed by: Laure Duthilleul
- Written by: Laure Duthilleul; Jean-Pol Fargeau; Pierre-Erwan Guillaume
- Produced by: Marie-Amélie Productions
- Starring: Sophie Marceau
- Cinematography: Christophe Offenstein
- Edited by: Catherine Quesemand
- Music by: Franck Louise
- Distributed by: Mars Distribution
- Release date: 15 May 2004 (France)
- Running time: 99 minutes
- Country: France
- Language: French
- Budget: $3.4 million
- Box office: $136.000

Nelly (French: À ce soir) is a 2004 French drama film directed by Laure Duthilleul and starring Sophie Marceau, Antoine Chappey, and Fabio Zenoni. Written by Laure Duthilleul, Jean-Pol Fargeau, and Pierre-Erwan Guillaume, the film is about the four days following the death of a small-town doctor, seen through the eyes of his wife, who is a nurse. The film was screened in the Un Certain Regard section at the 2004 Cannes Film Festival.

== Cast ==
- Sophie Marceau as Nelly
- Antoine Chappey as Jose
- Fabio Zenoni as Serge
- Gérald Laroche as René
- Pôme Auzier as Jeanne
- Jonas Capelier as Pedro
- Louis Lubat as Étienne
- Clotilde Hesme as Mathilde
- Sébastien Derlich as Manuel
- Marie Lubat as Mamie Antoinette
- Jeanette Duprat as Mamie Marie
- Catherine Davenier as Janette
- Martin Lartigue as Martin
- Lise Lamétrie as Marie-France
