= Voir la mer =

2011 film by Patrice Leconte

- Theatrical release poster
- Directed by: Patrice Leconte
- Written by: Patrice Leconte
- Produced by: Charles Gassot
- Starring: Nicolas Giraud; Clément Sibony; Pauline Lefèvre; Gilles Cohen
- Cinematography: Jean-Marie Dreujou
- Edited by: Joëlle Hache
- Music by: Étienne Perruchon
- Production companies: Produire à Paris; StudioCanal; France 2 Cinéma
- Distributed by: Océan Films
- Release date: 4 May 2011
- Running time: 91 minutes
- Country: France
- Language: French
- Budget: €3.6 million
- Box office: 33,079 admissions (France)

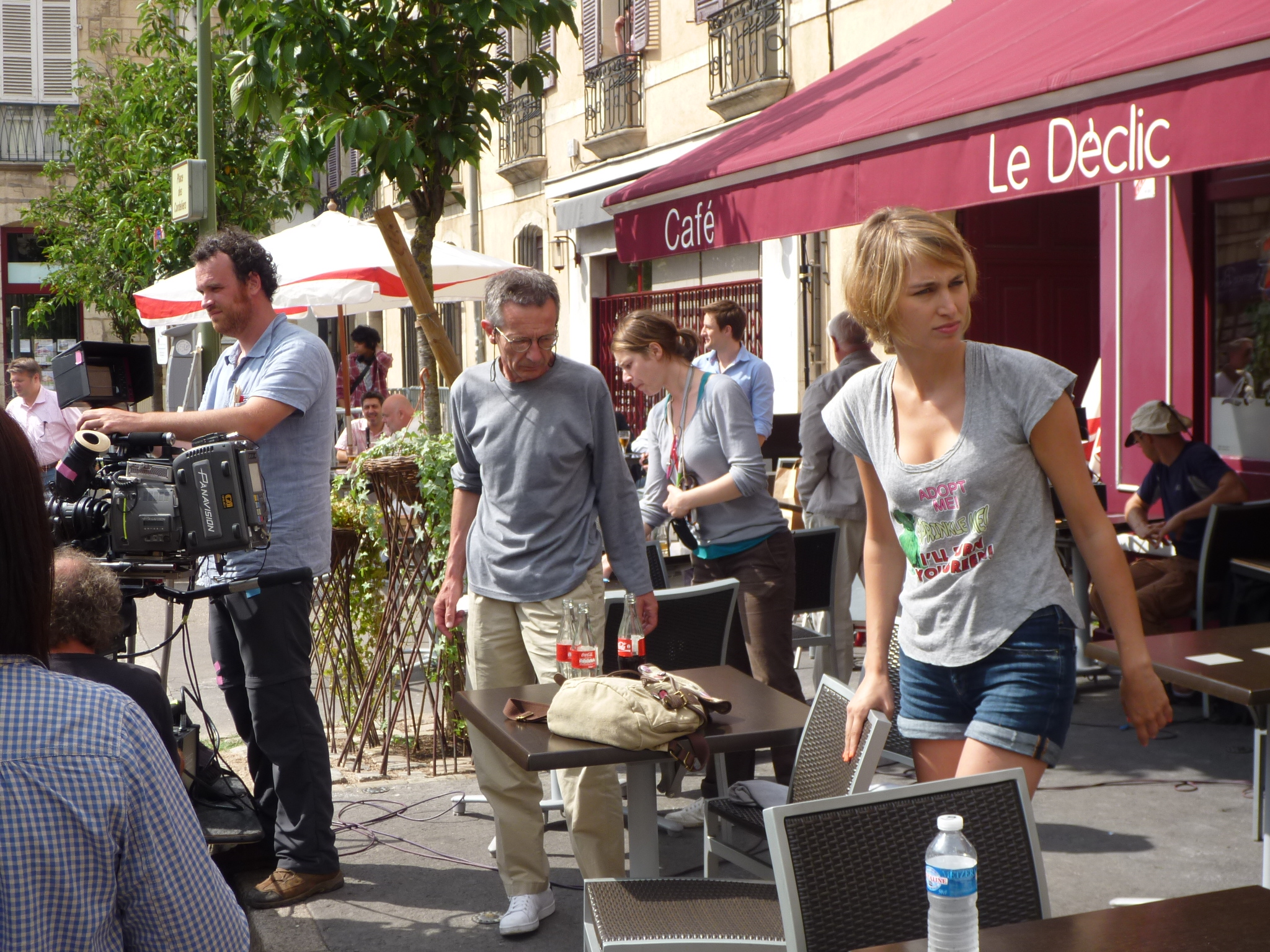
Director Patrice Leconte and actress Pauline Lefèvre during the shooting of Voir la mer in Dijon, August 2010

Voir la mer (lit. 'See the Sea') is a 2011 French road comedy-drama film written and directed by Patrice Leconte, and starring Nicolas Giraud, Clément Sibony and Pauline Lefèvre. The film follows two young brothers (Giraud and Sibony) on a road trip across France to visit their ailing mother one summer who cross paths with a free-spirited young woman (Lefèvre). It was released in France on 4 May 2011 by Océan Films.

== Plot ==
At a nightclub in Montbard, a young man, Nicolas, sets his sight on a young woman who is seemingly alone. Encouraged by an older man sitting next to him, Nicolas approaches her and asks her to dance. Before she can answer, the older man, revealed to be her boyfriend, demands that Nicolas apologise for bothering her. Nicolas refuses, believing he has done nothing wrong, which prompts the older man to punch him in the face.

The next day, Nicolas comes home to find the woman from the nightclub, Prudence, sitting outside his apartment. She reveals that she has left her controlling boyfriend Max, a salesman of costume jewellery, and asks to stay with Nicolas for a few days. When he explains that he is due to travel to Saint-Jean-de-Luz with his older brother Clément on their summer holidays to visit their ailing mother, Prudence asks to tag along, as she has never been to the sea.

On the morning of their departure, Clément is upset when Nicolas arrives with Prudence, as it was supposed to be just the two of them. While attempting to hitchhike, they are ambushed by Max, who drives by in his car and chases the trio into the nearby woods with a gun, determined to win Prudence back. The trio attempt to escape in Max's car, and when he approaches, they subdue him and steal his keys. As they drive away, Max fires at the car and shatters the rear glass. They leave the car behind, and Prudence uses Nicolas's cell phone to inform Max where to pick up his car, in which she leaves a ring that he had given her.

The trio board a bus to Dijon, where they pick up a second-hand motorhome for the rest of the trip. Stopping at a local supermarket, Nicolas and Clément go shopping for supplies while Prudence waits in the motorhome. The brothers then go to a jewellery store to buy Prudence a new ring to replace the one she gave back to Max, but when the clerk says that the salesman is coming by later, the two rush back to the motorhome. Just as Max arrives, the trio drive away unnoticed.

The next day, as they stop to swim in a lake, Prudence confesses that she likes both brothers and proposes a ménage à trois. Prudence and Nicolas then have sex in the nearby woods. Later, while Prudence and Clément are having sex, Max calls Nicolas asking about Prudence; Nicolas reveals that she is now in a relationship with both brothers and tells him to leave them alone. The trio continue their road trip, until one day, their motorhome is hit by steel barrels that were being transported by the driver ahead of them. While waiting for the motorhome to be repaired, Clément receives a call notifying him of his mother's death.

Arriving in Saint-Jean-de-Luz, Nicolas and Clément attend their mother's wake while Prudence dines at a pizzeria, where Max surprises her and joins her at the table, but she remains unfazed. The next day, after their mother's funeral, the brothers go to the beach with Prudence, who announces that she is staying in Saint-Jean-de-Luz, as she has landed a job as a waitress at the pizzeria. She tearfully kisses both men goodbye.

As Nicolas and Clément drive back to Montbard, a motorist driving by motions for them to stop. Prudence exits the car and puts on a song on a portable CD player while she and Nicolas share a slow dance on the roadside, since they could not dance together when they first met at the nightclub. She then crosses the highway, intending to hitchhike. A driver stops to pick her up, but as the brothers prepare to depart, she changes her mind and stays. Prudence stands on the opposite side of the highway while smiling at Nicolas and Clément, who are waiting for her to cross the road and reunite with them.

== Cast ==
- Nicolas Giraud as Nicolas
- Clément Sibony as Clément
- Pauline Lefèvre as Prudence
- Gilles Cohen as Max
- Jacques Mathou as Jacky Novion, the stuntman
- Isabelle Petit-Jacques as the jewellery store clerk
- Urbain Cancelier as the barrel truck driver
- Clémence Thioly as Juliette, Clément's ex-girlfriend
- Jean-Claude Aubrun as the garage boss
- Laurent Gendron as Arthur Chaix (uncredited)

== Production ==
The film was shot from 23 August to 1 September 2010 in the French cities of Biarritz, Ciboure and Saint-Jean-de-Luz. Filming also took place in Nevers and Dijon.
