= Nicolas Giraud =

French actor and filmmaker (born 1978)

- Born: 12 November 1978 (age 47); Saintes, Charente-Maritime, France
- Occupations: Actor, director, screenwriter, film editor

Nicolas Giraud (born 12 November 1978) is a French actor and filmmaker. Giraud is known for playing the role of Peter in the 2008 action film Taken. He is the writer, director and lead actor of the short film Faiblesses (2009). Giraud played the lead role in L'Astronaute (2022), a French film that he wrote and directed.

== Selected filmography ==
Year	Title	Role	Notes
2008	Taken	Peter	
2008	Like a Star Shining in the Night	Marc	
2009	Faiblesses	Lui	
2010	The Extraordinary Adventures of Adèle Blanc-Sec	Andrej Zborowski	
2011	Voir la mer	Nicolas	
2012	Ce que le jour doit à la nuit	Fabrice	
2014	Far from Men	Lieutenant Le Tallec	
2015	Anton Tchékhov 1890	Anton Tchekhov	
2017	The Guardians		
2018	Close Enemies		
2022	L'Astronaute	Jim	
