= René Féret =

French actor (1945–2015)

- Born: 1945; La Bassée, France
- Died: 28 April 2015 (aged 69–70); Paris, France
- Occupations: Actor, screenwriter, film director, producer
- Years active: 1973–2015

René Féret (26 May 1945 – 28 April 2015) was a French actor, screenwriter, film director, and producer. He made several films around an invented family living in northern France, the Gravets, but based on his own life experience. His 1975 drama film, The Story of Paul (Histoire de Paul) won the Prix Jean Vigo, and he became known outside France for his historical dramas such as Mozart's Sister (2010) and Anton Tchékhov 1890 (2015).

== Early life and education ==
René Féret was born in La Bassée, France in 1945. He was born into a modest family in northern France who ran a small business. He was affected from an early age by the shadow of a brother whose death at the age of four had preceded his birth, called René.

His father died when Féret was 22, and Féret then attempted suicide, which led to his being sent to a psychiatric hospital. He drew on this experience for his film, Histoire de Paul in 1975.

== Career ==
Féret's film Solemn Communion was entered into the 1977 Cannes Film Festival.

In The Man Who Wasn't There (L'Homme qui n'était pas là), his 1987 film adaption of Roderick MacLeish's novel, he played alongside Claude Jade in the leading role of Charles Elaine.

Very much an independent creator, Féret made several films around an invented family living in northern France, the Gravets, but based on his own life experience. He often used members of his own family in his films. Féret also turned to marginalised individuals in trouble: a man sent to a psychiatric hospital in Histoire de Paul (1975), a hermaphrodite in Mystère Alexina, the elderly in Rue du Retrait (2000) and cancer sufferers in Comme une étoile dans la nuit (2009).

Later in his career, he turned his attention to historical artistic figures with the films Nannerl, la sœur de Mozart (Mozart's Sister, 2010) and Anton Tchékhov 1890 (2015). His work was described as "subtle and possessing great sensibility".

== Death ==
Féret died in Paris on 28 April 2015, aged 69.

== Filmography ==
Year	Title	Credited as					Notes
Year	Title	Director	Screenwriter	Producer	Actor	Role	Notes
1971	La Fuite				Yes	Krapiline (credited as René-Marie Féret)	Telefilm
1973	George Who?				Yes	Manceau (credited as René-Marie Féret)	directed by Michèle Rosier
1973	Jeanne d'Arc				Yes	Le duc d'Alençon	Telefilm
1975	Cinéma 16				Yes	Marc	TV series
1975	The Story of Paul	Yes	Yes				Prix Jean Vigo
1976	Lumière				Yes	Julien	directed by Jeanne Moreau
1976	Moi, Pierre Rivière, ayant égorgé ma mère, ma sœur et mon frère...			Yes	Yes	Docteur Morin	As delegate producer
1977	Solemn Communion	Yes	Yes	Yes	Yes	Julien I Gravet at 30	Nominated—Palme d'Or (1977 Cannes Film Festival)
1979	Plurielles			Yes			
1980	Fernand	Yes	Yes	Yes			
1980	L'Enfant roi	Yes	Yes		Yes	François / Ravi	
1981	The Prodigal Daughter				Yes	Le mari	
1981	Last Summer			Yes			
1983	Side Roads			Yes			
1983	Orage			Yes			Short film
1983	Idylle			Yes			Short film
1983	Sarah				Yes	Duparc	
1985	The Mystery of Alexina	Yes	Yes	Yes			As executive producer Nominated—Prix Un Certain Regard (1985 Cannes Film Festival)
1986	Tous en boîte				Yes		TV mini-series
1987	The Man Who Wasn't There	Yes	Yes		Yes	Charles	
1987	La Tricheuse				Yes	Benini	Telefilm
1988	Savannah				Yes	Fabien	
1989	Baptême	Yes	Yes				Bayard d'Or for Best Film (Golden Bayard)
1991	Un homme et deux femmes		Yes	Yes			
1992	Promenades d'été	Yes	Yes	Yes			
1993	The Place of Another	Yes	Yes				Shown as part of Cinéma en France, Cannes 1993
1994	3000 scénarios contre un virus				Yes		TV series
1994	Couchettes express				Yes	Le médecin	Telefilm directed by Luc Béraud
1996	Les Frères Gravet	Yes	Yes				
1996	Un siècle d'écrivains	Yes					TV series documentary (episode: John Fante)
1997	Dakan			Yes			directed by Mohamed Camara
1999	East/West				Yes	Ambassadeur de France	directed by Régis Wargnier
1999	Mélissol				Yes	Prof. Davézieux	TV series
2000	Les Enfants du Printemps				Yes	Xavier de Montherlant	TV mini-series
2001	Rue du retrait	Yes	Yes		Yes	Paul	
2003	Local Kid	Yes	Yes	Yes	Yes	Pierre Merveille	
2004	Toute une vie				Yes		Short film
2006	Il a suffi que maman s'en aille…	Yes	Yes	Yes			
2008	Like a Star Shining in the Night	Yes	Yes	Yes	Yes	Le chef de Marc et Eric (uncredited)	
2010	Mozart's Sister	Yes	Yes	Yes	Yes	Le professeur de musique	Nominated—Satellite Award for Best Original Screenplay
2012	Madame Solario	Yes	Yes	Yes			
2013	The Film to Come	Yes	Yes	Yes	Yes	Le directeur du cinéma	
2015	Anton Tchékhov 1890	Yes	Yes	Yes			
2015	Le Chant du merle		Yes				
