= Daniel Metge =

French screenwriter and film director (born 1970)

Daniel Metge (born December 17, 1970, in Sainte-Colombe les Vienne, France) is a French screenwriter and film director.

== Filmography ==
=== Director ===
- 2008 : Ciels de traîne short film with Michael Lonsdale, Lila Redouane, Julie Durand
- 2010 : Ornières (Rust) short film with Serge Riaboukine, Lila Redouane, Daniel Metge
- 2011 : Mon amoureux (My sweetheart) Short film with Salomé Stévenin, Miss Ming, Grégory Givernaud
- 2013 : Poussières (Dusts) Short film with Salomé Stévenin, Serge Riaboukine, Nicolas Giraud, Jenny Bellay, Bruno Henry

== Awards ==
- 2012 : My sweetheart : Prix Louis le Prince award, Leeds International Film Festival
- 2012 : My sweetheart : Reflet d'or award, Geneva International Film Festival Tous écrans
- 2012 : My sweetheart : Best short film award, Französische Filmtage Tübingen Stuttgart
- 2012 : My sweetheart : Golden Unicorn for Best international short film award, Alpinale Short Film Festival (Nenzing, Austria)
- 2012 : My sweetheart : Prix France Télévision du Court métrage, Clermont-Ferrand Short Film Festival
- 2012 : My sweetheart : Best performance in a live action short for Miss Ming, Toronto International Short Film Festival
- 2013 : My sweetheart : Short film special mention, Los Angeles Colcoa Short Film Competition
- 2015 : Dusts : GreenFlicks Award for Best Environmental Short Film, Sydney Flickerfest International Short Film Festival
