= The King's Daughters =

2000 French film by Patricia Mazuy

- Film poster
- Directed by: Patricia Mazuy
- Written by: Patricia Mazuy; Yves Dangerfield; Yves Thomas
- Produced by: Helga Bähr; Diana Elbaum; Denis Freyd
- Starring: Isabelle Huppert
- Cinematography: Thomas Mauch
- Edited by: Ludo Troch
- Music by: John Cale
- Production companies: Archipel 35; Lichtblick FilmProduktion; Entre Chien et Loup; Arte France Cinéma; France 2 Cinéma; WDR; FMB Films; ACCAAN; Les Films du Camélia; Cinéart
- Distributed by: Universal Pictures (through United International Pictures)
- Release date: 17 May 2000
- Running time: 119 minutes
- Countries: France; Belgium; Germany
- Language: French

The King's Daughters (French: Saint-Cyr) is a 2000 period drama film directed by Patricia Mazuy. It was screened in the Un Certain Regard section at the 2000 Cannes Film Festival. It was adapted from the novel La maison d’Esther by Yves Dangerfield.

== Plot ==
In March 1685, Louis XIV’s final wife Madame de Maintenon wishes to set up a boarding school for young daughters of noble families that have fallen on hard times, the Maison royale de Saint-Louis, a school where girls receive a pious but liberal education. The first difficulty is that the students from the provinces all speak different regional languages and dialects and the first task is to teach them all to speak a standardised Parisian French.

After a few years of indifference, the school's first aims prove impossible to attain. An important crisis arises from a performance by the students of an extract from Iphigenie by Racine. This provokes too much passion among the actors and so Madame de Maintenon asks Racine to write her a play for her students that praises virtue – this turns out to be Esther. The students put on the new play and, when the king and his court attend the production, Madame de Maintenon realises that it has encouraged the nobles of the court to view her protégées as targets for seduction and marriage. Marriage proposals mount up and one nobleman even manages to break into the school.

Madame de Maintenon decides to impose stricter rules and plunges into religion in an attempt to expiate her past. She asks an abbot to help her keep students on the right Christian moral path and keep them safe from the world. Instead of turning its students into an elite for the world outside, the school falls prey to realities, cuts itself off from reality and falls apart – the film ends with its final failure and closure.

== Cast ==
- Isabelle Huppert as Madame de Maintenon
- Jean-Pierre Kalfon as Louis XIV
- Simon Reggiani as The Abbot
- Jean-François Balmer as Racine
- Anne Marev as Madame de Brinon
- Ingrid Heiderscheidt as Sylvine de la Maisonfort
- Nina Meurisse as Lucie de Fontenelle
- Morgane Moré as Anne de Grandcamp
- Bernard Waver as Gobelin
- Jérémie Renier as François de Réans
- Jeanne Le Bigot as Lucie (child)
- Mathilde Lechasles as Anne (child)
- Alain Hinard as First soldier

== Production ==
Filming took place at the Abbaye aux Hommes and the Abbaye aux Dames in Caen, at the Abbaye Saint-Martin de Sées in Sées (Orne), on the grounds of the Château de Sassy, the marshes of Colombières and Troarn, the gardens of the Château de Canon, and at the Château de Villette (Val-d'Oise).

In December 2024, testifying before the French parliamentary inquiry commission on violence in cinema and audiovisual, Nina Meurisse recounted the trauma she experienced while filming two controversial scenes in this movie at the age of 12.

== Soundtrack ==
The film's score was composed by Welsh composer and former member of the Velvet Underground, John Cale. The score was arranged by Randy Wolf, and released as a soundtrack album.

== See also ==
- Isabelle Huppert on screen and stage
