= Mehdi Charef =

French film director (1952–2026)

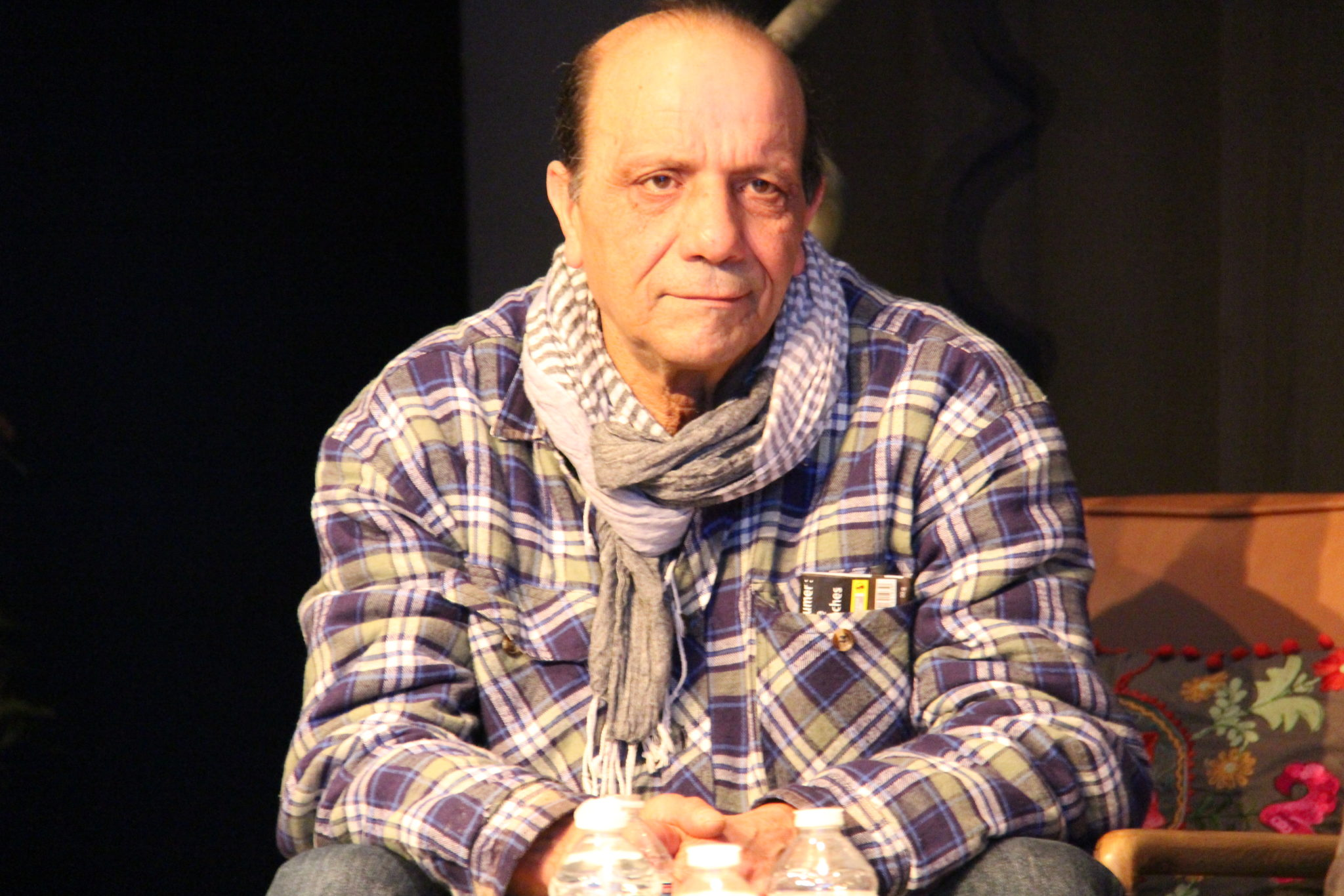
- Born: 21 October 1952 (age 74); Maghnia, French Algeria
- Died: 9 June 2026 (aged 73)
- Occupations: Film director, screenwriter
- Years active: 1985–2026

Mehdi Charef (21 October 1952 – 9 June 2026) was a French film director and screenwriter of Algerian descent. He worked on eleven films between 1985 and 2007. His film Tea in the Harem was screened in the Un Certain Regard section at the 1985 Cannes Film Festival. For this film, he won the César Award for Best First Film. Seven years later, his film In the Country of Juliets competed for the Palme d'Or at the 1992 festival. Charef died on 9 June 2026, at the age of 73.

== Filmography ==
- Le Thé au harem d'Archimède (1985)
- Miss Mona (1987)
- Camomille (1988)
- Au pays des Juliets (1992)
- Aime-toi toujours (1995)
- Pigeon volé (1996)
- La Maison d'Alexina (1999)
- Marie-Line (2000)
- La Fille de Keltoum (2001)
- Tanza (2005)
- Cartouches gauloises (2007)
- Graziella (2015)
