= Patricia Mazuy =

French film director

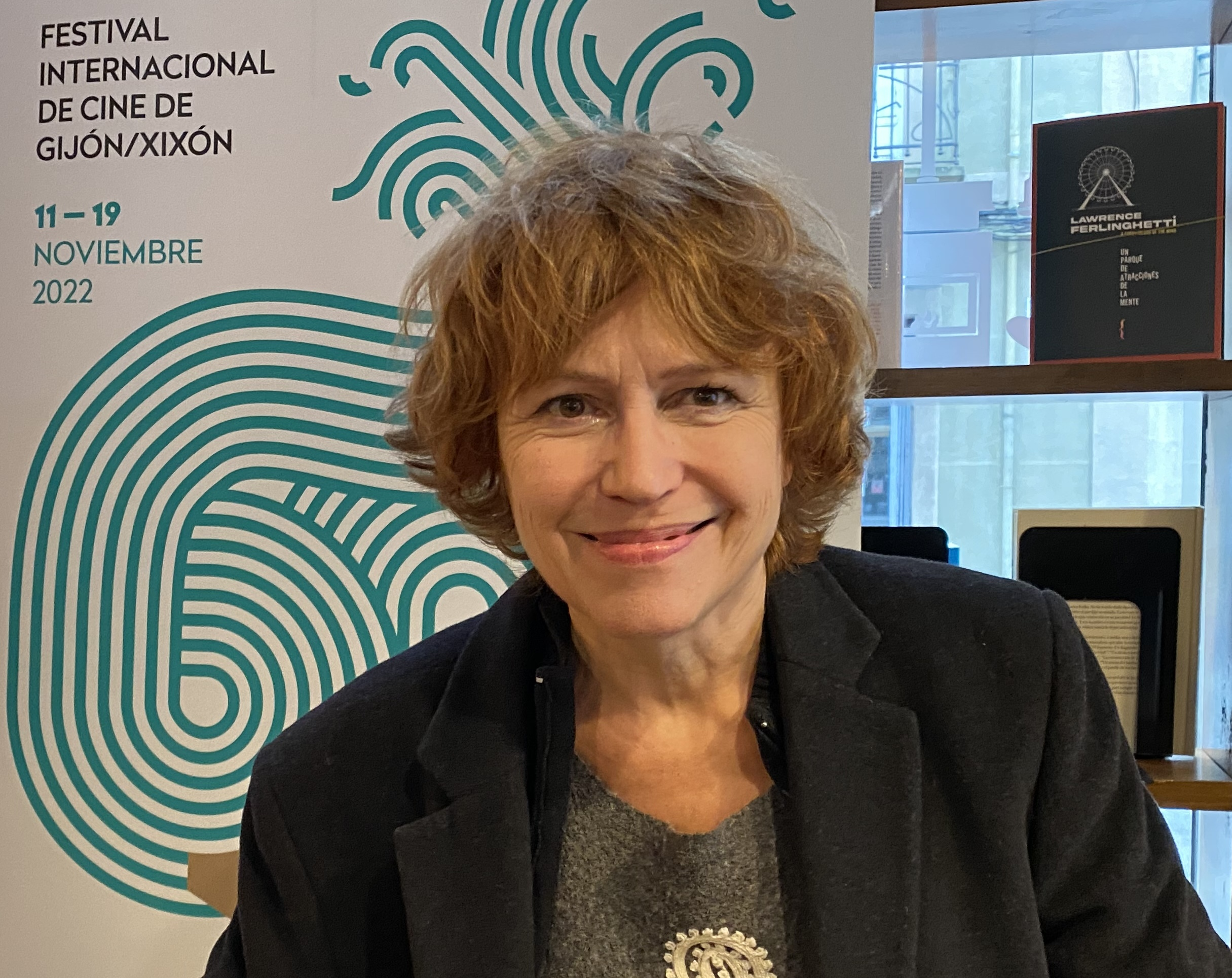
- Born: 1960 (age 65–66); Dijon, France
- Occupations: Film director Screenwriter
- Years active: 1984–present

Patricia Mazuy (French: [mazɥi]; born 1960) is a French film director and screenwriter. Her film Peaux de vaches was screened in the Un Certain Regard section at the 1989 Cannes Film Festival. Eleven years later her film Saint-Cyr was screened in the same section at the 2000 Cannes Film Festival.

== Political views ==
In December 2023, alongside 50 other filmmakers, Mazuy signed an open letter published in Libération demanding a ceasefire and an end to the killing of civilians amid the 2023 Israeli invasion of the Gaza Strip, and for a humanitarian corridor into Gaza to be established for humanitarian aid, and the release of hostages.

== Filmography ==
- La boiteuse (1984)
- Peaux de vaches (1989)
- Des taureaux et des vaches (1992)
- Travolta Et Moi (1993)
- La finale (1999)
- Saint-Cyr (2000)
- Basse Normandie (2004)
- Sport de filles (2011)
- Paul Sanchez est revenu! (2018)
- Bowling Saturne (2022)
- La Prisonnière de Bordeaux (2024)

== Recognition and awards ==
In 2025, Mazuy was appointed as a member of the jury at the 78th Locarno Film Festival for First Feature Competition.
