= Pierre-André Boutang =

French filmmaker (1937–2008)

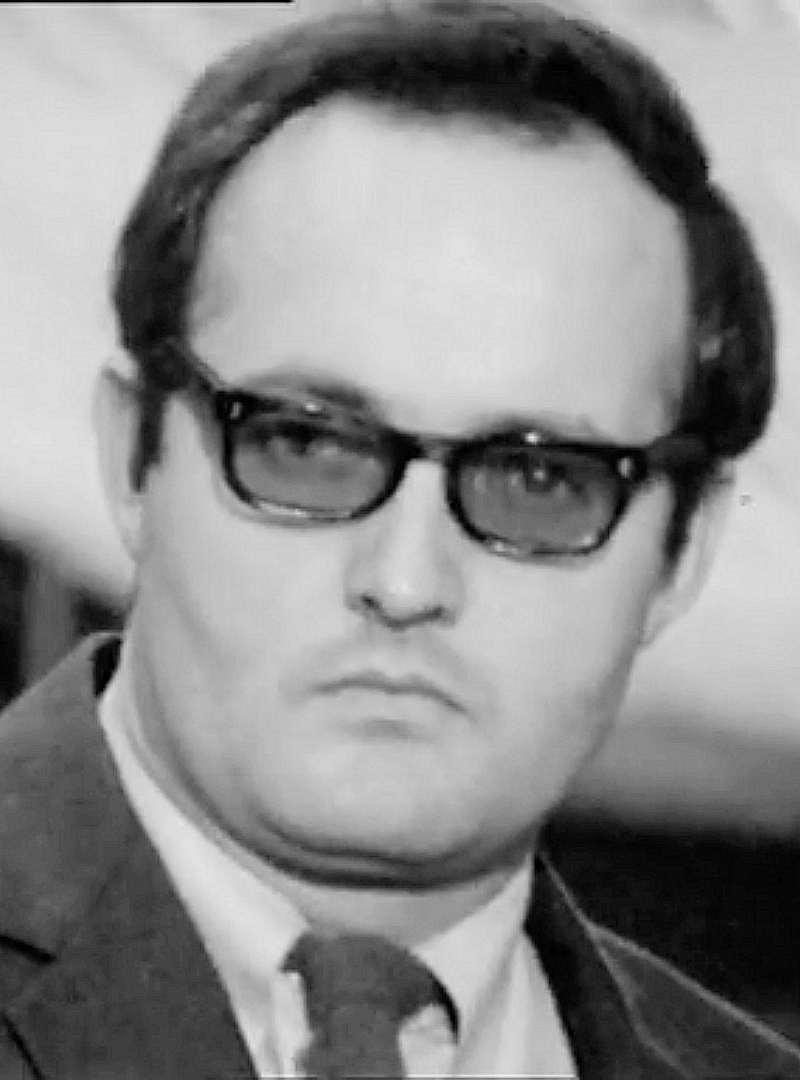
- Pierre-André Boutang
- Born: March 25, 1937; Paris
- Died: August 20, 2008; Porticcio, Corsica
- Occupation(s): Writer; Publisher

Pierre-André Boutang (March 25, 1937, in Paris – August 20, 2008, in Porticcio, Corsica) was a French documentary filmmaker, producer and director. He was one of the leaders of the Franco-German channel Arte as well as of La Sept previously.

== Biography ==
Son of Marie-Claire and maurrasianist and monarchist philosopher Pierre Boutang, and half-brother of Yann Moulier-Boutang, he was married to Martine Ferrand, editor at Éditions Grasset, with whom he had a daughter, Adrienne, teacher-researcher specializing in American cinema and half-sister of French radio journalist Émilie Aubry and novelist Gwenaëlle Aubry.

== Formation ==
As a student at Sciences Po in 1958, he met Jean-Daniel Pollet and joined the ORTF as assistant director.

== Career ==
In association with Philippe Collin, director and film critic at Elle and at Le Masque et la plume, Boutang produced and arranged interviews with such notables of film and literature as Jean-Paul Sartre, George Steiner, Gilles Deleuze and Serge Daney. He was close to French film producer Jean-Pierre Rassam.

Boutang was responsible for cultural programs for FR3 and Océaniques from 1987 to 1992, and for Oceanopolis and Métropolis from 1995 to 2006, replaced by Rebecca Manzoni.

== Filmography ==
=== Documentary ===
==== Director ====
- 1966 : Jean-Pierre Melville, François Truffaut, Collection Les écrans de la ville.
- 1968 : Pierre Kast, Collection Les écrans de la ville.
- 1970 : Jean-Pierre Melville à propos du « Cercle rouge », Collection Le journal du cinéma.
- 1971 : Jean-Pierre Léaud à propos du film "Les Deux Anglaises et le continent", Collection Le journal du cinéma.
- 1980 : Marco Ferreri, Meryl Streep, Collection Ciné regards
- 1980 : Peter Sellers à propos de Jacques Tati, Collection Cine regard
- 1980 : Isabelle Huppert à propos de "Loulou " et de Maurice Pialat, Collection Champ contrechamp
- 1982 : Godard à Cannes
- 1983 : Orson Welles
- 1988 : La bibliothèque idéale : 2/2 "Ce vice impuni, la lecture…"
- 1989 : Archives du XX^{e} siècle : Emmanuel Berl (1892 - 1976) 1/2
- 1989 : Archives du XX^{e} siècle : Emmanuel Berl (1892 - 1976) 2/2
- 1990 : Zulawski-Raimondi-Godounov
- 1990 : Débat sur les destin des boucs émissaires entre René Girard, universitaire et Roberto Calasso, directeur des éditions Adelphi
- 1990 : André Dhôtel
- 1990 : Le Louvre. Du donjon à la pyramide
- 1990 : Fidel Castro. Octobre 1990
- 1991 : Merci la vie
- 1991 : Archives du XX^{e} siècle : Ungaretti 1/2
- 1991 : Archives du XX^{e} siècle : Ungaretti 2/2
- 1991 : Archives du XX^{e} siècle : Eugenio Montale
- 1991 : Eugène Delacroix, l'ange ou le barbare
- 1991 : Jean-Paul II
- 1992 : Jean-Louis Étienne, le paysan des pôles
- 1992 : Serge Daney : itinéraire d’un ciné-fils No. 1 – Le temps des Cahiers, Collection « Océaniques »
- 1992 : Serge Daney : itinéraire d’un ciné-fils No. 2 – des « Cahiers » à « Libé », Collection « Océaniques »
- 1992 : Serge Daney : itinéraire d’un ciné-fils No. 3 – Le regard du zappeur, Collection « Océaniques »
- 1993 : Pierre Braunberger : producteur de films 1/3
- 1993 : Pierre Braunberger : producteur de films 2/3
- 1993 : Pierre Braunberger : producteur de films 3/3
- 1995 : Kino Cinéma – Woody Allen, Collection « Metropolis »
- 1996 : Antonioni toujours, Collection « Metropolis »
- 1997 : Conversation avec Dario Fo
- 1999 : 13 journées dans la vie de Pablo Picasso
- 1999 : Otar Iosseliani, un Georgien à Paris, Collection « Thema »
- 2000 : La Joconde sourit aux primitifs
- 2000 : Depardieu le regard des autres, Collection « Thema »
- 2002 : Tati à la plage, Collection « Metropolis »
- 2003 : Raoul Girardet
- 2004 : Toni Negri, des années de plomb à l'empire
- 2004 : Jean Rouch raconte à Pierre-André Boutang
- 2005 : La Cinémathèque du 21^{e} siècle, Collection « Metropolis »
- 2005 : Alexandre Soljenitsyne, le combat d'un homme
- 2006 : Piccoli !, Collection « Metropolis »
- 2006 : René Girard – la violence et le sacré
- 2006 : Le musée du Quai Branly
- 2007 : Jeanne M. Côté cour, côté cœur

==== Producer ====
- 1965 : Fritz Lang, Collection « Les écrans de la ville ».
- 1965 : Truffaut, Wilder, Collection « Les écrans de la ville ».
- 1965 : Jean Rouch, Collection « Les écrans de la ville ».
- 1965 : La Règle du jeu, Collection « Les écrans de la ville ».
- 1966 : Jean-Luc Godard, Collection « Les écrans de la ville ».
- 1966 : François Truffaut à propos d’Alfred Hitchcock, Collection « Les écrans de la ville
- 1971 : Les acteurs de « Trafic » parlent du film de Tati, Collection "le journal du cinéma"
- 1971 : Jean-Pierre Léaud à propos du film « Les Deux Anglaises et le continent, Collection « Le journal du cinéma ».
- 1976 : Sartes par lui-même
- 1979 : « Tess » de Roman Polanski, Collection « Ciné regards ».
- 1980 : Elia Kazan, Collection « Ciné regards ».
- 1980 : Marco Ferreri, Meryl Streep, Collection « Ciné regards ».
- 1980 : Maurice Pialat, Collection « Ciné regards ».
- 1981 : King Vidor
- 1981 : Gloria Swanson, Collection « Ciné regards ».
- 1981 : Joseph Mankiewicz, Collection « Ciné regards ».
- 1982 : Godard à Cannes
- 1987 : De Bernanos à Pialat : Sous le soleil de Satan, Collection « Océaniques ».
- 1987 : Duras-Godard, Collection « Océaniques »
- 1988 : L’âge des Cinémathèques, Collection « Océaniques ».
- 1991 : Krystof Kieslowski, Collection « Océaniques »
- 1996 : L'Abécédaire de Gilles Deleuze
- 2006 : Mao, une histoire chinoise

=== Fiction producer ===
- 1972 : Nous ne vieillirons pas ensemble, Maurice Pialat.
- 1972 : Tout le monde il est beau, tout le monde il est gentil, Jean Yanne
- 1973 : Moi y'en a vouloir des sous, Jean Yanne
- 1973 : La Grande Bouffe, Marco Ferreri coproduit avec Jean-Pierre Rassam
- 1974 : Lancelot du Lac, Robert Bresson.
- 1975 : Numéro deux, Jean-Luc Godard.
- 1978 : Comment ça va?, de Jean-Luc Godard.
- 1974 : Les Chinois à Paris, de Jean Yanne.
- 1984 : Favoris de la Lune, d'Otar Iosselliani

=== Actor ===
- 1972: Everybody he's handsome, everybody he's nice, by Jean Yanne
- 1972: We Will Not Grow Old Together, by Maurice Pialat
- 1973: La Grande bouffe, by Marco Ferreri
- 1973: Moi y'en a vouloir des sous, by Jean Yanne
- 1974: Touche pas à la femme blanche, by Marco Ferreri
- 1974: Lancelot du lac, by Robert Bresson
- 1974: Les Chinois à Paris, by Jean Yanne.
- 1985 : Cinématon #545, de Gérard Courant : lui-même.

=== Interviews ===
- 1978 : Marcello Mastroianni, Collection « L’homme en question ».
- 1987 : Dom Juan, le mythe et la réalité » de Jean-Marie Carzou, Collection "Océaniques"
- 1988 : La bibliothèque idéale : 1/2 Voyage aux bibliothèques., Collection "Océaniques"
- 1989 : Satyajit Ray, Calcutta 89, Collection « Océaniques ».
- 1999 : Leos Carax – Interview, Collection « Metropolis ».
- 2006 : Polanski par Polanski Collection, « Thema ».

=== Achorman ===
- 1964 : Antonioni, Collection « Les écrans de la ville »
- 1992 : Le FIPA à Cannes. de Guy Seligmann
