= Police (1985 film) =

- Theatrical release poster
- Directed by: Maurice Pialat
- Screenplay by: Catherine Breillat; Sylvie Danton; Jacques Fieschi; Maurice Pialat
- Story by: Catherine Breillat
- Produced by: Emmanuel Schlumberger
- Starring: Gérard Depardieu; Sophie Marceau; Richard Anconina
- Cinematography: Luciano Tovoli
- Edited by: Yann Dedet
- Music by: Henryk Mikolaj Gorecki (Symphonie N° 3); sung by Stefania Woytowicz; Symphonie Orchester der Südwestfunk; conducted by Ernest Bour
- Production companies: Gaumont; TF1 Films Productions; Canal+
- Distributed by: Gaumont Distribution
- Release date: 4 September 1985 (France)
- Running time: 114 minutes
- Country: France
- Language: French

Police is a 1985 French neo noir crime drama film directed by Maurice Pialat and starring Gérard Depardieu, Sophie Marceau, and Richard Anconina. Based on an original script by Catherine Breillat, the story is framed as a bleak chronicle of police life; it centers on a disenchanted police detective who falls for a young female criminal associate, and ends up compromising himself for her. The film was successful at the French box office, and received two César Awards nominations. For his performance, Depardieu received the Volpi Cup for Best Actor at the Venice Film Festival.

== Plot ==
Louis-Vincent Mangin, a tough and cynical police detective, works at a police station in the Belleville neighborhood in Paris. Disillusioned with his job, he alleviates his loneliness by seeing prostitutes. As the area is plagued by heroin trafficking, Mangin steps up the pressure on the underworld. He violently interrogates a gang member, obtaining from him the names of the drug ring's leaders: the Slimane brothers. Mangin then organizes a police raid which leads to the arrest of Simon Slimane, the youngest of the siblings, along with his girlfriend, Noria.

Mangin interrogates Simon and Noria, alternating physical violence with psychological pressure. Lambert, a criminal defense lawyer with ambiguous connections to the underworld, who is also a personal friend of Mangin, intervenes on their behalf. Despite Lambert's attempts to secure Simon's release, Mangin sends the latter to prison. He keeps interrogating Noria but she remains elusive, and is ultimately released due to the lack of solid evidence. A young, idealistic trainee commissioner, Marie Vedret, joins the police department and observes with unease its routinely violent inner workings.

Noria eventually takes advantage of Simon's imprisonment to steal a large sum of money from the Slimane clan. She then reconnects with Mangin who, fascinated by the young woman's beauty and her jaded and aloof attitude, gives in to her advances. They become lovers, though Mangin eventually understands that she stole the drug money and is with him for protection.

Lambert, acting as an intermediary, informs Mangin that Noria's life is in danger if she does not return the money. Mangin coerces Noria into returning the stolen money to the gangsters. Noria later abandons him, leaving him to his solitude and the sordid routine of his job.

== Cast ==
- Gérard Depardieu as Louis-Vincent Mangin
- Sophie Marceau as Noria
- Richard Anconina as Lambert
- Pascale Rocard as Marie Vedret
- Sandrine Bonnaire as Lydie
- Frank Karoui as René
- Jonathan Leïna as Simon
- Jacques Mathou as Gauthier
- Bernard Fuzellier as Nez cassé
- Bentahar Meaachou as Claude
- Yann Dedet as Dédé
- Artus de Penguern as Inspector

== Production ==
=== Development ===
Police was Maurice Pialat's second film with Gérard Depardieu. The two had made Loulou in 1980, but their working relationship had been difficult and they had parted inamicably. Pialat, however, sought to reconcile with the actor and rekindle their partnership.

The film originated from Pialat's interest in making a "genre" picture. The director initially wanted to adapt the American crime novel Bodies Are Dust, by P. J. Wolfson, but as the project evolved, he abandoned the idea, feeling that transposing the story into a French setting didn't work. Seeking realism, Pialat asked his screenwriter, Catherine Breillat, to immerse herself in the lives of actual police officers. Breillat observed the day-to-day operations of a police station in Belleville and produced accounts that Pialat subsequently rewrote. Dissatisfied with Pialat's revisions, Breillat became embroiled in a dispute with the director that ultimately led to a lawsuit. Breillat succeeded in having her name included in the credits and adapted her work for the film into a novel of the same title, published in 1985. Sylvie Danton (later Pialat's wife) and Jacques Fieschi were later tasked with further rewrites. For this film, Pialat was granted from Gaumont a larger budget than usual. TF1 and the newly-founded Canal+ were also involved in the financing.

Pialat wished to cast Sandrine Bonnaire, who had starred in his previous film À Nos Amours, in the main female role. However, scheduling issues led Bonnaire to be replaced by Sophie Marceau as the female lead. To compensate, Pialat cast Bonnaire in a supporting part, though the actress was ultimately frustrated by her limited screen time.

=== Filming ===
Principal photography started in November 1984. Marceau, 18 at the time of filming, had become a major star in French cinema thanks to her performance in La Boum (1980). However, her working relationship with Pialat proved notoriously fraught. On set, Marceau initially accepted Pialat’s very harsh directing style without complaint; this only resulted in irritating the director, who found the actress's attitude too polished and sought to push her to the limit.

Marceau expected support from her co-star Gérard Depardieu, with whom she had had a good rapport on the film Fort Saganne, made the previous year. However, Depardieu's behavior on Pialat's shoot proved entirely different and he regularly bullied her, for example by making sure he had bad breath during their scenes together. Marceau later said that Pialat would team up with Depardieu to go after her; during the scene where Depardieu was supposed to slap her, Pialat insisted that he hit her for real. According to Marceau's account, Depardieu slapped her harder and harder with each successive take.

Upon release, Marceau refused to promote the film, while Pialat insulted her in the media, calling her a "stupid bitch" and saying that she was the most unpleasant person he had ever worked with. Marceau later called Pialat an "S&M pervert." Depardieu, for his part, acknowledged in 2005 that he had behaved poorly with a "very young" Marceau, stating: "Back then, I was a bit of a predator. And a bit of an idiot, too."

In 2023, in the context of the sexual assault allegations against Depardieu, Marceau addressed in an interview the actor's problematic behavior while filming Police. According to her account, during a bed scene, Depardieu went much further than planned, placing his hands on the actress under the sheets. She clarified, however, that Depardieu did not actually grope her—unlike how he behaved toward the wardrobe assistants.

Pialat had an equally difficult relationship with Richard Anconina, whom he regularly called talentless. The actor threatened to walk off the set; Pialat ultimately agreed to write him a letter of apology and read it in front of the whole crew.

On the contrary, rekindling their working relationship proved very rewarding for Pialat and Depardieu; the pair remained lifelong friends and made two further films together, including Under the Sun of Satan which won the Palme d'Or at the 1987 Cannes Film Festival.

== Reception ==
The film was commercially successful in France, where it sold 1,830,970 admissions; it was Pialat's main box office success. It was also well received by French critics.

Upon the film's American release, Sheila Benson of the Los Angeles Times gave it a positive review, with particular praise for how the direction subverted the crime film settings: "Pialat’s rigorous style burns any hint of melodrama out of his material; we are left with the bleached bones of a policier and the unutterable feeling of the truth". Richard Brody of The New Yorker magazine called the re-release of the film an "astringently naturalistic drama."

== Accolades ==
Depardieu won the Volpi Cup for Best Actor at the 42nd Venice International Film Festival for his performance as the conflicted Mangin. The film earned two nominations at the 1986 César Awards, one for Best Editing, and another for Depardieu as Best Actor.

== Home video ==
Police was reissued on DVD - including zone 1 editions - and Blu-Ray, and on VOD on various streaming services including Arte, Canal+ and Orange.
