= Arlette Langmann =

French screenwriter (born 1946)

- Born: 3 April 1946 (age 79); Paris, France
- Occupation(s): Screenwriter, film editor, production designer
- Relatives: Claude Berri (brother); Julien Rassam (nephew); Thomas Langmann (nephew); Jean-Pierre Rassam (brother-in-law by marriage)

Arlette Langmann (born 3 April 1946) is a French screenwriter, film editor and production designer. Born in Paris to Jewish immigrant parents from Romania and Poland, Langmann is best known for her long-running collaborations with her brother Claude Berri, Maurice Pialat, and Philippe Garrel.

== Filmography ==
- Naked Childhood (1968) co-writer
- Le poème de l'élève Mikovsky (1971) editor
- La maison des bois (1971) editor, TV Mini-series
- We Won't Grow Old Together (1972) editor
- The Mouth Agape (1974) editor
- Un coup de rasoir (1977) editor
- Graduate First (1978) editor
- La fabrique, un conte de Noël (1979) editor
- Loulou (1980) co-writer
- Je Vous Aime (1980) editor
- Le maître d'école (1981) editor
- À Nos Amours (1983) co-writer, production designer
- Madman at War (1985) co-writer
- Jean de Florette (1986) editor
- La Fille de quinze ans (1989) co-writer
- Chimère (1989) co-writer
- Uranus (1990) co-writer
- Jour de colère (1992) co-writer
- Nous deux (1992) co-writer
- Germinal (1993) co-writer
- Les amoureux (1994) co-writer
- Circuit Carole (1995) co-writer
- Les victimes (1996) co-writer
- Le Vent de la nuit (1999) co-writer
- La débandade (1999) co-writer
- Sauvage innocence (2001) co-writer
- Regular Lovers (2005) co-writer
- Frontier of the Dawn (2008) co-writer
- Jealousy (2013) co-writer
- In the Shadow of Women (2015) co-writer
- Lover for a Day (2017) co-writer
- Le sel des larmes (2019) co-writer
- Passages (2023), additional dialogue
- The Plough (2023), co-writer
