= Banlieue =

Suburb of a large city, especially in France

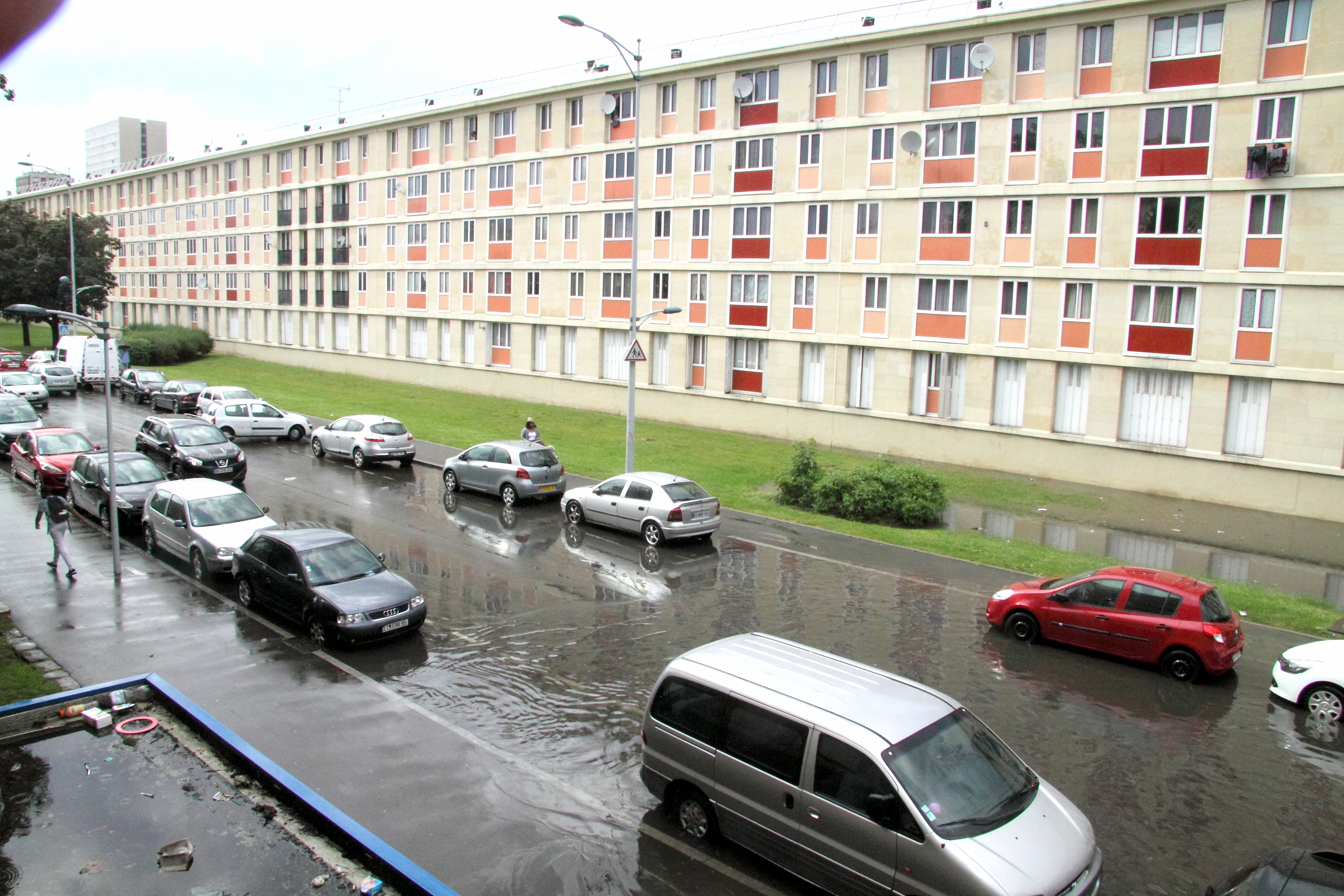
Sarcelles, ten miles to the north of Paris, is an example of a low-income banlieue.

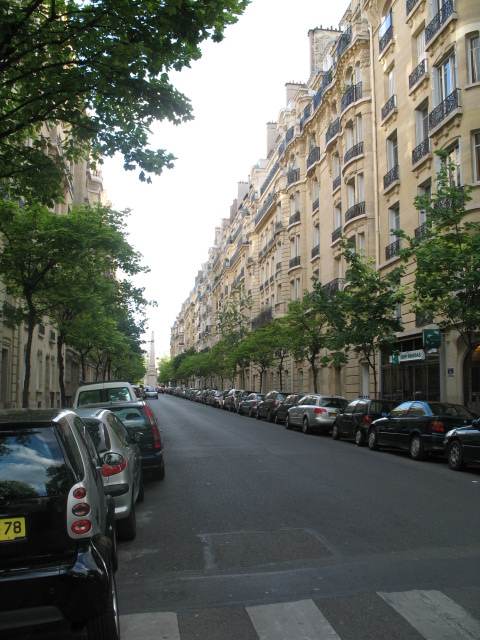
Neuilly-sur-Seine, adjacent to Paris's 16th arrondissement, is an example of a high-income banlieue.

In France, a banlieue (UK: /bɒnˈljuː/; French: [bɑ̃ljø]) is a suburb of a large city, or all its suburbs taken collectively. Banlieues are divided into autonomous administrative entities and do not constitute part of the city proper. For instance, 80 percent of the inhabitants of the Paris metropolitan area live outside the city of Paris.

Beginning in the 1970s, the term banlieue has taken on a particular connotation, becoming a popular word for economically-deprived suburbs featuring low-income housing projects (HLMs) that are home to large immigrant populations. People of foreign descent reside in what are often called poverty traps. As of 2025, in France, approximately 1,500 suburbs are home to more than 5 million people.

== Etymology ==
The French word banlieue is derived from the thirteenth century Vulgar Latin term banleuca composed of the German term ban meaning decree or official announcement with leuca which refers to the extension of the authority beyond the walls of a town.

== History ==
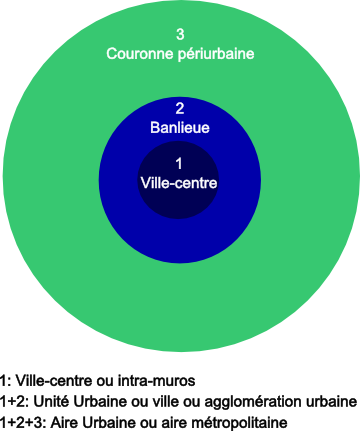
An illustration of the terms Ville-centre (city proper), Banlieue (suburb), Couronne périurbaine (peri-urban ring), Unité urbaine (urban unit) and Aire urbaine (urban area), by INSEE

In France, since the establishment of the Third Republic at the beginning of the 1870s, communities beyond the city centre essentially stopped spreading their own boundaries, as a result of the extension of the larger Paris urban agglomeration. The city – which in France corresponds to the concept of the "urban unit" – does not necessarily have a correspondence with a single administrative location, and instead includes other communities that link themselves to the city centre and form the banlieues.

Since the annexation of the banlieues of major French cities during the Second Empire period (Lyon in 1852, Lille in 1858, Paris in 1860, Bordeaux in 1865), French cities have extended their boundaries very little despite the growth of the cities. Almost all large and mid-sized cities in France with a banlieue have developed a couronne périurbaine (in English: peri-urban ring).

Communities in the countryside beyond the near-urban ring are regarded as being outside the city's strongest social and economic sphere of influence, and are termed communes périurbaines. In either case, they are divided into numerous autonomous administrative entities.

Banlieues 89, a design-led urban policy backed by the French government, renovated over 140 low-cost estates, such as Les Minguettes and the Mas du Taureau block in Vaulx-en-Velin. Improvements were made in road and rail access, cafes and shops were built, and the towers and blocks were made to look more attractive. In Vaulx-en-Velin, for instance, shops and a library were built, houses were built to make the landscape more interesting, 2,500 homes were renovated, and the blocks were repainted.

=== Geography of the banlieues ===
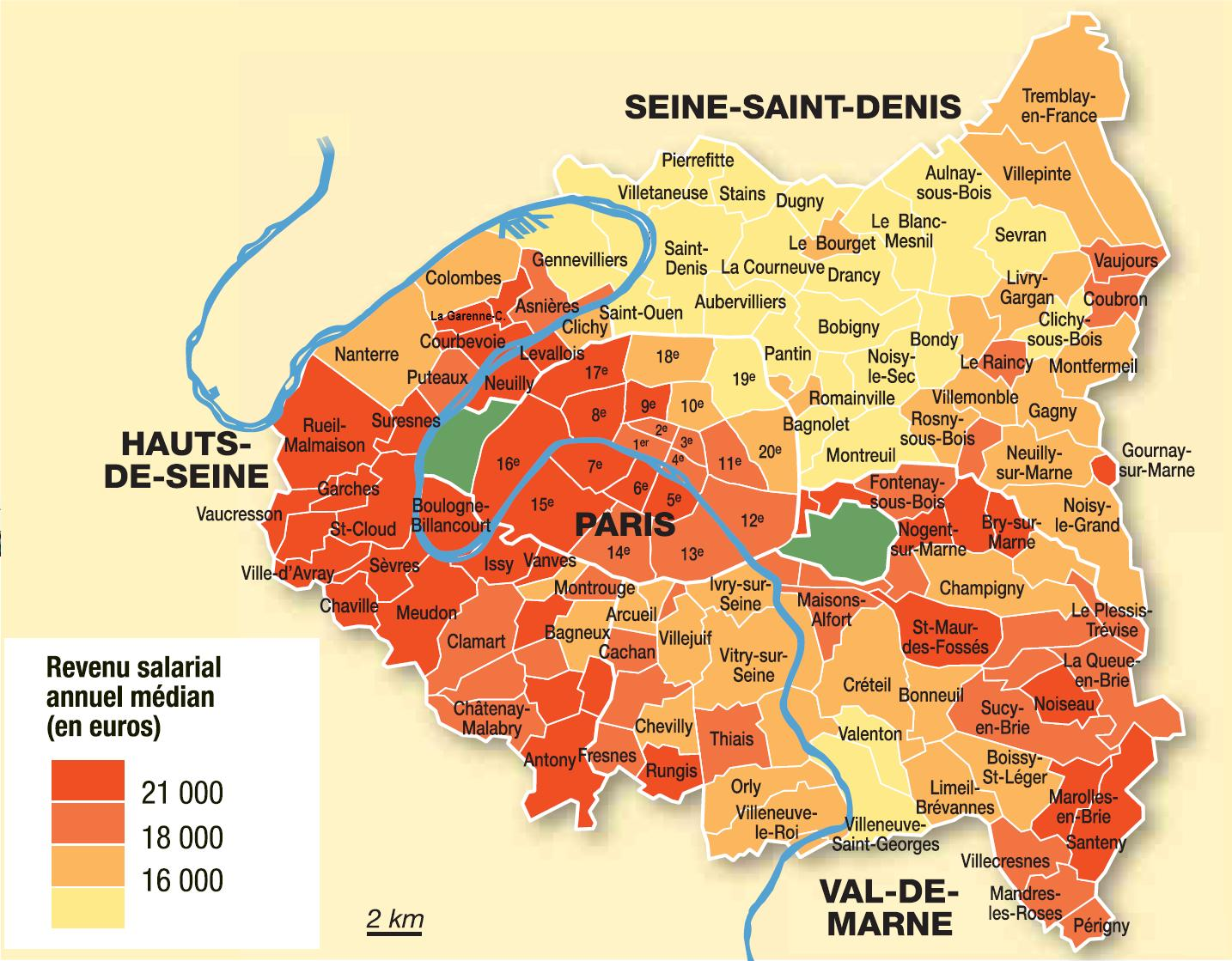
The west of Paris and its suburbs is dominated by middle- and upper-class residents, while the northeast has a large concentration of residents living in poverty.

The word banlieue is, in formal use, a socially neutral term, designating the urbanized zone located around the city centre, comprising both sparsely and heavily populated areas. Therefore, in the Parisian metropolitan area, for example, the wealthy suburb of Neuilly-sur-Seine may be referred to as a banlieue as might the poor suburb of La Courneuve. To distinguish them, Parisians refer to a banlieue aisée (in English: comfortable suburb) for Neuilly, and to a banlieue défavorisée (in English: disadvantaged suburb) for Clichy-sous-Bois.

==== Paris ====
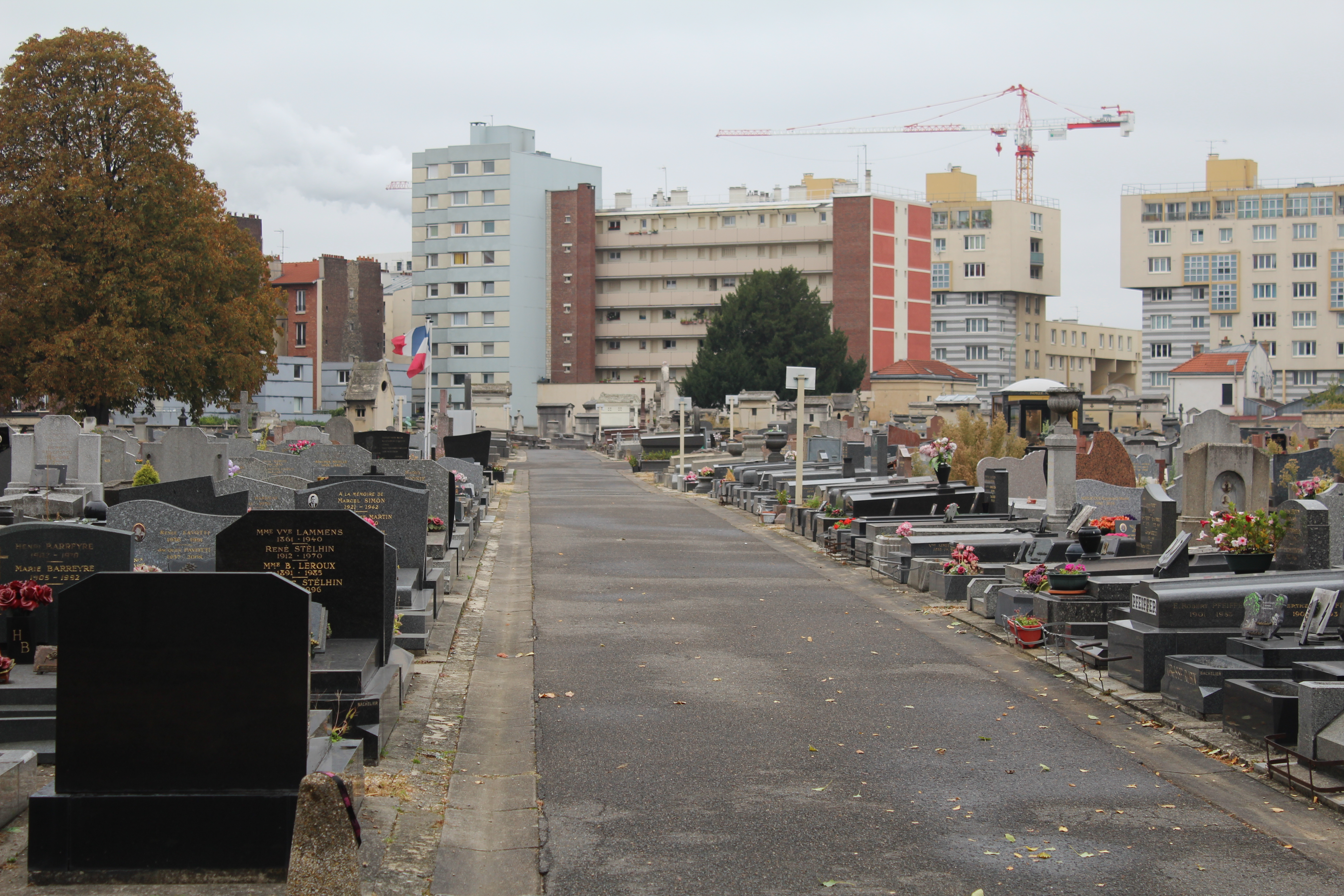
Example of a low-income banlieue Saint-Ouen-sur-Seine

The Paris region can be divided into several zones. In the northwest and the northeast, many areas are vestiges of former working-class and industrial zones, in the case of Seine-Saint-Denis and Val-d'Oise. In the west, the population is generally upper class, and the centre of business and finance, La Défense, is also located there. Versailles, Le Vésinet, Sceaux, Maisons-Laffitte and Neuilly-sur-Seine are affluent suburbs of Paris, while Clichy-sous-Bois, Bondy and Corbeil-Essonnes are less so.

The southeast banlieues are less homogenous. Close to Paris, there are many communities that are considered "sensitive" or unsafe (Bagneux, Malakoff, Massy, Cachan, Les Ulis), divided by residential zones with a better reputation (Verrières-le-Buisson, Bourg-la-Reine, Antony, Fontenay-aux-Roses, Sceaux).

The farther away from the Paris city centre, the more the banlieues of the south of Paris can be divided into two zones. On one side, there are the banks of the Seine, where working-class residents used to live (there are still pockets of disadvantaged areas) but also other areas that are especially well off. Also are large cities close to Paris, such as Chanteloup-les-Vignes, Sartrouville, Les Mureaux, Mantes-la-Jolie, Poissy, Achères, Limay, Trappes, Aubergenville, Évry-Courcouronnes, Grigny, Corbeil-Essonnes, Saint-Michel-sur-Orge, Brétigny-sur-Orge, Sainte-Geneviève-des-Bois and Fleury-Mérogis.

On the other hand, small communities that are affluent can be found in the Yvelines department with Villennes-sur-Seine, Chatou, Croissy-sur-Seine, Le Pecq, Maisons-Laffitte but also in the Essonne and Seine-et-Marne departments: Etiolles, Draveil, Soisy-sur-Seine, Saint-Pierre-du-Perray or Seine-Port.

==== Paris: Banlieues rouges ====
The banlieues rouges ("red banlieues") are the outskirt districts of Paris where, traditionally, the French Communist Party held mayorships and other elected positions. Examples of these include Ivry-sur-Seine and Malakoff. Such communities often named streets after Soviet personalities, such as Avenue Vladimir-Ilitch-Lénine in Nanterre, or rue Youri Gagarine in Colombes.

==== Lyon and Marseille ====
The banlieues of large cities like Lyon and Marseille, like those of Paris, have also tended to suffer from a negative reputation. Ever since the French Commune government of 1871, they were and still are often ostracised and considered by other residents as places that are "lawless" or "outside the Republic", as opposed to "deep France", or "authentic France" associated with the provinces. However, it is in the banlieues that the young working households are found that raise children and pay taxes but lack in public services, in transportation, education, sports, as well as employment opportunities.

== Crime and protests ==
=== 1981 riots ===
In the summer of 1981, events involving young Franco-Maghrebis were met with varying reactions from the French public. Within the banlieues, events, called rodeos, would occur, where young "banlieusards" would steal cars and perform stunts and race them. Then, before the police could catch them, they would abandon the cars and set them on fire.

In July and August 1981, around 250 cars were vandalised. Grassroots groups began to demonstrate in public in 1983 and 1984 to publicise the problems of the Beurs and immigrants in France.

=== 2005 riots ===
Violent clashes between hundreds of youths and French police in the Paris banlieue of Clichy-sous-Bois began on 27 October 2005 and continued for more than 17 nights. The 2005 Paris suburb riots were triggered by the deaths of two teenagers (of black and Maghrebi descent) allegedly attempting to hide from police in an electrical substation, who were electrocuted.

=== 2020 riots ===
From 18 April 2020, Paris saw several nights of violent clashes over police treatment of ethnic minorities in the banlieues during the COVID-19 lockdown.

=== 2026 riots ===
In October 2026, the French student protests over the failing education system had turned into riots. Media reported that rioters came from banlieues, specifically the ones on the outskirts of Paris.

== Filmography ==
A number of films, both fiction and documentary, have focused on the banlieues. A selection are listed below.

- L'amour existe, Maurice Pialat, 1961
- Two or Three Things I Know About Her, Jean-Luc Godard, 1967
- Elle court, elle court la banlieue, Gérard Pirès, 1973
- Série noire, Alain Corneau, 1979
- La Haine, Mathieu Kassovitz, 1995
- 100% Arabica, Mahmoud Zemmouri, 1997
- Ma 6-T va crack-er, Jean-François Richet, 1997
- Games of Love and Chance, Abdellatif Kechiche, 2004
- District 13, Pierre Morel, 2004
- La Journée de la jupe, Jean-Paul Lilienfeld, 2008
- Neuilly Yo Mama!, Gabriel Julien-Laferrière, 2008
- Tout ce qui brille, Géraldine Nakache, 2010
- Beur sur la ville, Djamel Bensalah, 2011
- Porn in the Hood, Franck Gastambide, 2012
- On the Other Side of the Tracks', Bertrand Tavernier, 2012
- Girlhood, Céline Sciamma, 2014
- Dheepan, Jacques Audiard, 2015
- Divines, Houda Benyamina, 2016
- Les Misérables, Ladj Ly, 2019
- Athena, Romain Gavras, 2022
- Infested, Sébastien Vaniček, 2023

== See also ==
- Aire urbaine
- Bidonville
- Faubourg
- Poverty in France#Bidonvilles
- Sensitive urban zone
