= Under the Sun of Satan =

Classic French novel

- Title page for Under the Sun of Satan (1949 edition)
- Author: Georges Bernanos
- Genre: Novel
- Publisher: Plon
- Publication place: France

Under the Sun of Satan (French: Sous le soleil de Satan) is Georges Bernanos's first published novel, appearing in 1926 in Paris.

According to Michel Estève, the novel draws on three primary inspirations: the life of the curate Jean-Marie Vianney, which informs the character Donissan; the writers Léon Bloy and Jules Barbey d'Aurevilly, from whom Bernanos takes the idea of a world deprived of God and the idea of a union of reality and the supernatural, respectively; and the social climate of France after World War I, which Bernanos vocally decried.

It is listed #45 on Le Monde's 100 Books of the Century.

== Adaptations ==
=== Television ===
- Sous le soleil de Satan, téléfilm by Pierre Cardinal (1971) with Maurice Garrel and Catherine Salviat

=== Cinema ===
- Sous le soleil de Satan, film de Maurice Pialat (1987) with Gérard Depardieu and Sandrine Bonnaire. The film won the Palme d'or at the Festival de Cannes 1987.
