= Dominique Besnehard =

French actor

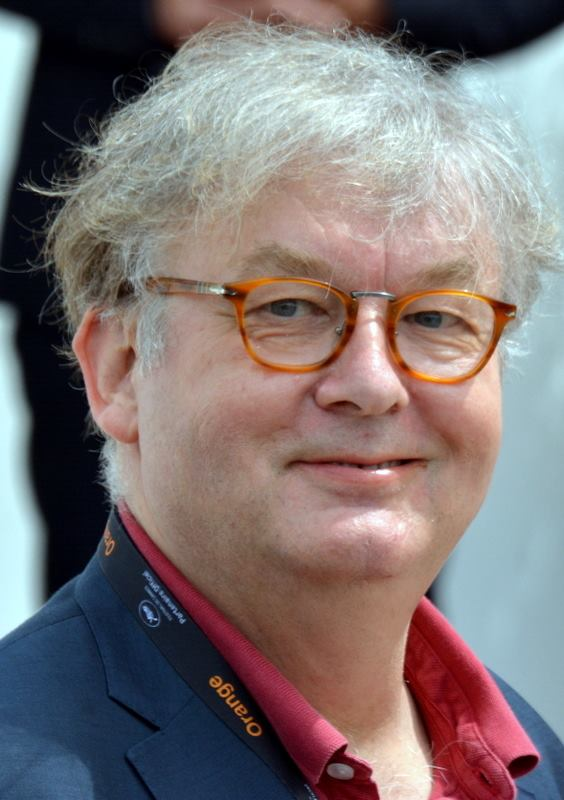
- Born: 5 February 1954 (age 72); Bois-Colombes, France
- Occupation: Actor
- Years active: 1975–present

Dominique Besnehard (French: [dɔminik bɛsneaʁ]; born 5 February 1954) is a French actor, film producer, casting director, writer and talent manager. He has appeared in more than 80 films and television shows since 1975. He starred in the 1983 film À nos amours, which was entered into the 34th Berlin International Film Festival.

== Filmography ==
=== Actor ===
Year	Title	Role	Director	Notes
1975	Ces grappes de ma vigne	Martial	Alain Quercy	TV mini-series
1975	Un sac de billes	The monitor	Jacques Doillon	
1979	The Hussy	The teacher	Jacques Doillon	
1980	L'entourloupe		Gérard Pirès	
1980	Je vous aime	Dominique	Claude Berri	
1981	Un étrange voyage	Marc	Alain Cavalier	
1981	Psy	Michel	Philippe de Broca	
1981	Diva	The store	Jean-Jacques Beineix	
1982	Légitime violence		Serge Leroy	
1983	À Nos Amours	Robert	Maurice Pialat	
1984	Les cavaliers de l'orage	Capt. Blott	Gérard Vergez	
1984	Marche à l'ombre	Smalto	Michel Blanc	
1984	Ave Maria	Decarsalade	Jacques Richard	
1984	Série noire	Etienne	Jacques Rouffio	TV series (1 episode)
1985	La Nuit porte-jarretelles	The mad	Virginie Thévenet	
1986	Série noire	Etienne	Maurice Dugowson	TV series (1 episode)
1986	Paulette, la pauvre petite milliardaire	Gustave	Claude Confortès	
1986	Betty Blue	A client	Jean-Jacques Beineix	
1986	Tenue de soirée		Bertrand Blier	
1986	Cent francs l'amour	M. Kruk	Jacques Richard	
1986	La femme secrète		Sébastien Grall	
1987	La vie dissolue de Gérard Floque	Cyril	Georges Lautner	
1987	L'été en pente douce	Leval	Gérard Krawczyk	
1987	Sale temps	Voice	Alain Pigeaux	Short
1988	L'enfance de l'art		Francis Girod	
1988	The Little Thief		Claude Miller	
1989	Les cigognes n'en font qu'à leur tête		Didier Kaminka	
1989	Les jupons de la révolution	Louis XVI	Caroline Huppert	
1989	Jour après jour	Artistic Director	Alain Attal	
1991	Nothing But Lies	The Inspector	Paule Muret	
1992	Un été glacé	The Photograph	Bernard Giraudeau	TV movie
1993	Une journée chez ma mère	A fireman	Dominique Cheminal	
1993	Mensonge	Rozenberg	François Margolin	
1993	Colpo di coda	The butcher	José María Sánchez	TV movie
1994	La Cité de la peur	The Journalist	Alain Berbérian	
1994	Grosse Fatigue	Michel Blanc's agent	Michel Blanc	
1994	Rendez-moi ma fille	Tony	Henri Helman	TV movie
1994	Un indien dans la ville	Master Dong	Hervé Palud	
1995	Les femmes et les enfants d'abord		Sandra Joxe	TV movie
1995	L'homme aux semelles de vent		Marc Rivière	TV movie
1995	J'aime beaucoup ce que vous faites		Xavier Giannoli	Short
1996	Mémoires d'un jeune con	Casting Director	Patrick Aurignac	
1996	Les Grands Ducs	Atlas's boss	Patrice Leconte	
1996	The Liars	Casting Director	Élie Chouraqui	
1996	Beaumarchais	Louis XVI	Édouard Molinaro	
1996	Pédale douce	Riki	Gabriel Aghion	
1997	Didier	Kiki	Alain Chabat	
1997	Héroïnes	Eddy	Gérard Krawczyk	
1998	Paparazzi	Dédé	Alain Berbérian	
1998	Denis	The club's man	Catherine Corsini	TV movie
1998	Que la lumière soit	Advertising Director	Arthur Joffé	
1998	Mookie	"Le Gai Paris"'s owner	Hervé Palud	
1998	Un amour de cousine	The Inspector	Pierre Joassin	TV movie
1999	Le bleu des villes	Records Producer	Stéphane Brizé	
1999	The Count of Monte Cristo	Defense Attorney	Josée Dayan	TV mini-series
1999	Balzac	Werdet	Josée Dayan	TV movie
2000	Victoire, ou la douleur des femmes	The commissioner	Nadine Trintignant	TV mini-series
2000	Le prof	Julien	Alexandre Jardin	
2000	Most Promising Young Actress	The Flattering	Gérard Jugnot	
2000	Franck Spadone	The expert	Richard Bean	
2000	Ça ira mieux demain	A patient	Jeanne Labrune	
2002	Les Misérables	Gueulemer	Josée Dayan	TV mini-series
2002	Asterix & Obelix: Mission Cleopatra	The taster	Alain Chabat	
2002	Les filles, personne s'en méfie	The producer	Charlotte Silvera	
2002	Blanche	The Duke	Bernie Bonvoisin	
2002	C'est le bouquet!	Laurent	Jeanne Labrune	
2003	Laisse tes mains sur mes hanches	Gérald	Chantal Lauby	
2003	Aurélien	Zamora	Arnaud Sélignac	TV movie
2003	Les Liaisons dangereuses	The deputy of the foundation	Josée Dayan	TV mini-series
2003	The Car Keys	Himself	Laurent Baffie	
2004	Colette, une femme libre		Nadine Trintignant	TV mini-series
2004	RRRrrrr!!!	Pierre	Alain Chabat	
2004	Podium	The psy	Yann Moix	
2004	Cause toujours!	The druggist	Jeanne Labrune	
2004	Pédale dure	Riki	Gabriel Aghion	
2005	Le courage d'aimer	Sabine's agent	Claude Lelouch	
2005	La tête haute	The hotelier	Gérard Jourd'hui	TV movie
2006	Lisa et le pilote d'avion	The magician	Philippe Barassat	
2006	Le Lièvre de Vatanen	Barman Chibougamau	Marc Rivière	
2007	Monsieur Max	The dealer	Gabriel Aghion	TV movie
2007	Jean de La Fontaine - Le défi	The clothing merchant	Daniel Vigne	
2008	Musée haut, musée bas	A visitor	Jean-Michel Ribes	
2008	Mes stars et moi	Dominique Bhé	Laetitia Colombani	
2009	Le mirage		Fabien Pruvot	Short
2009	L'apparition de la Joconde		François Lunel	
2010	HH, Hitler à Hollywood	Himself	Frédéric Sojcher	
2010	Rendez-vous avec un ange	A spectator	Sophie de Daruvar, Yves Thomas	
2011	Le grand restaurant II	The Straight	Gérard Pullicino	TV movie
2011	The Conquest	Pierre Charon	Xavier Durringer	
2011	Mystère au Moulin Rouge	Charles Zidler	Stéphane Kappes	TV movie
2012	Mince alors!	Antoine	Charlotte de Turckheim	
2012	Max	Director of the school	Stéphanie Murat	
2013	Chinese Puzzle	The editor	Cédric Klapisch	
2013	Indiscrétions	The night bar's owner	Josée Dayan	
2014	Brèves de comptoir	Chorister	Jean-Michel Ribes	
2014	Pim-Poum le petit panda	Himself	Alexis Michalik	Short
2015	Collection rue des ravissantes	Serge	Clémence Madeleine-Perdrillat	TV mini-series
2015	Call My Agent!	Paul Granier	Cédric Klapisch	TV series (1 episode)
2016	La folle histoire de Max et Léon	The medecin	Jonathan Barré	
2020	Spring Blossom (Seize printemps)	Gérard	Suzanne Lindon	

=== Producer ===
Year	Title	Director	Notes
2005	Premiers pas	Jérôme Bertin, Olivier Farine, François-Hubert Rondier	TV movie documentary
2007	Days of Darkness	Denys Arcand	
2008	Musée haut, musée bas	Jean-Michel Ribes	
2008	L'amour dans le sang	Vincent Monnet	TV movie
2009	Queen to Play	Caroline Bottaro	
2010	Rendez-vous avec un ange	Sophie de Daruvar, Yves Thomas	
2011	Avant l'aube	Raphaël Jacoulot	
2012	Rue des roses	Patrick Fabre	Short
2012	Mince alors!	Charlotte de Turckheim	
2012	J'enrage de son absence	Sandrine Bonnaire	
2013	Adore	Anne Fontaine	
2013	Grand départ	Nicolas Mercier	
2013	Not to Be	Clément Sibony	Short
2014	Où elle est maman?	Olivia Ruiz	Short
2014	Office du tourisme	Benjamin Biolay	Short
2014	La nouvelle musique	François Goetghebeur, Nicolas Lebrun	Short
2014	Un conte de la Goutte d'Or	Dyana Gaye	Short
2014	Pim-Poum le petit panda	Alexis Michalik	Short
2014	Brèves de comptoir	Jean-Michel Ribes (2)	
2014	La douce empoisonneuse	Bernard Stora	TV movie
2015	Call My Agent!	Cédric Klapisch, Lola Doillon & Antoine Garceau	TV series (6 episodes)
2015	I Am a Soldier	Laurent Larivière	
2016	Escort Boys	Alexis Michalik	
2017	Bonne Pomme	Florence Quentin	
