= Jean Yanne =

French actor, screenwriter, producer, director and composer

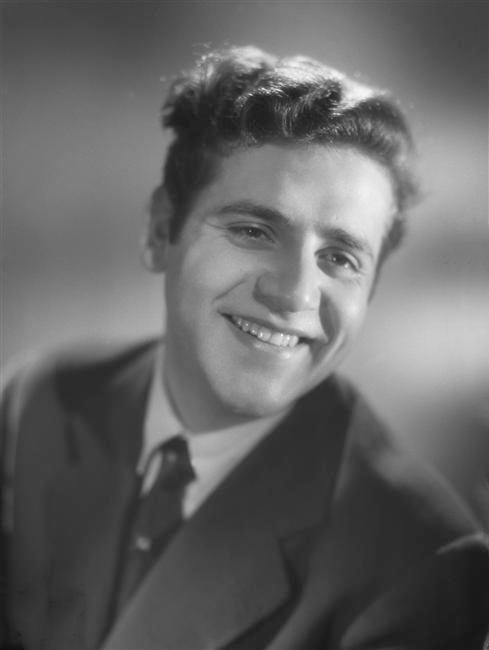
- Born: Jean Roger Gouyé; 18 July 1933; Les Lilas, Seine, France
- Died: 23 May 2003 (aged 69); Morsains, Marne, France
- Resting place: Les Lilas Cemetery
- Occupations: Actor; Screenwriter; Producer; Director; Composer
- Years active: 1952–2003
- Spouses: Jacqueline Renée Guellerin Allard (m. 1960; died 1972) Mimi Coutelier (m. 1975; died 2003)
- Children: 2

Jean Yanne (French pronunciation: [ʒɑ̃ jan]; born Jean Roger Gouyé [ʒɑ̃ ʁɔʒe ɡuje]; 18 July 1933 – 23 May 2003) was a French actor, screenwriter, producer, director and composer. In 1972, he won the Cannes Film Festival Award for Best Actor for his performance in the film We Won't Grow Old Together.

== Filmography ==
=== Actor ===
- 1952: Nez de cuir (directed by Yves Allégret) - Extra (uncredited)
- 1952: Il est minuit, Docteur Schweitzer (directed by André Haguet) - Extra (uncredited)
- 1952: Le Chemin de Damas (directed by Max Glass) - Extra (uncredited)
- 1955: Les Carnets du Major Thompson (directed by Preston Sturges) - Extra (uncredited)
- 1964: La Vie à l'envers (directed by Alain Jessua) - Monsieur Kerbel
- 1964: Jealous as a Tiger - Alphonse
- 1964: Un égale trois
- 1964: La Femme spectacle (directed by Claude Lelouch) - Le 'journaliste' (uncredited)
- 1965: Tight Skirts, Loose Pleasures - Pornotropos
- 1965: Dis-moi qui tuer - Federucci
- 1966: Monnaie de singe (directed by Yves Robert) - Félix
- 1966: Line of Demarcation (directed by Claude Chabrol) - Tricot, l'instituteur
- 1966: The Saint Lies in Wait - Mueller-Strasse
- 1967: The Viscount (directed by Maurice Cloche) - Billette
- 1967: Bang Bang (Les aventures de Sheila !) (directed by Serge Piollet) - Robert Vaucamu alias 'Bob la Rafale'
- 1967: Week End (directed by Jean-Luc Godard) - Roland Durand
- 1968: Un drôle de colonel (directed by Jean Girault) - Barton
- 1968: Ces messieurs de la famille (directed by Raoul André) - Marco Broca
- 1969: Erotissimo (directed by Gérard Pirès) - Philippe
- 1969: Que la bête meure (directed by Claude Chabrol) - Paul Decourt
- 1970: Le Boucher (directed by Claude Chabrol) - Popaul / Paul Thomas
- 1971: Fantasia chez les ploucs (directed by Gérard Pirès) - Doc Noonan
- 1971: Laisse aller... c'est une valse (directed by Georges Lautner) - Serge Aubin
- 1971: Êtes-vous fiancée à un marin grec ou à un pilote de ligne ? (directed by Jean Aurel) - Roger Blanchard
- 1971: Le Saut de l'ange (directed by Yves Boisset) - Louis Orsini
- 1972: Nous ne vieillirons pas ensemble (directed by Maurice Pialat) - Jean
- 1972: Tout le monde il est beau, tout le monde il est gentil - Christian Gerber
- 1973: Moi y'en a vouloir des sous - Benoît Lepape
- 1974: Chinese in Paris - Régis Forneret
- 1974: Touche pas à la femme blanche (Don't Touch The White Woman!) (directed by Marco Ferreri)
- 1975: Chobizenesse - Clément Mastard
- 1977: Armaguedon (directed by Alain Jessua) - Louis Carrier
- 1977: The Accuser (L'Imprécateur) (directed by Jean-Louis Bertucelli) - Directeur des relations humaines
- 1977: Moi, fleur bleue (directed by Éric Le Hung) - Max
- 1978: La Raison d'État (directed by André Cayatte) - Jean-Philippe Leroi
- 1979: Je te tiens, tu me tiens par la barbichette - Inspecteur Chodaque
- 1980: Asphalte (directed by Denis Amar) - Arthur Colonna
- 1982: A Day in a Taxi (Une journée en taxi) (directed by Robert Ménard) - Michel
- 1982: Deux heures moins le quart avant Jésus-Christ - Paulus
- 1983: Hanna K. (directed by Costa-Gavras) - Victor Bonnet
- 1983: Papy fait de la résistance (directed by Jean-Marie Poiré) - Murat
- 1988: Le téléphone sonne toujours deux fois!! (directed by Jean-Pierre Vergne) - L'homme au téléphone
- 1985: Liberté, égalité, choucroute - Marat (uncredited)
- 1986: Le Paltoquet (directed by Michel Deville) - The Police Captain
- 1986: Oviri - William Molard
- 1986: Attention bandits! (directed by Claude Lelouch) - L'Expert (Simon Verini)
- 1987: Fucking Fernand (directed by Gérard Mordillat) - Andre Binet
- 1987: Cayenne palace (directed by Alain Maline) - L'Équateur
- 1988: Quicker Than the Eye (directed by Nicolas Gessner) - Inspector Sutter
- 1990: Le Radeau de la Méduse (directed by Iradj Azimi) - Duroy de Chaumareys
- 1991: Madame Bovary (directed by Claude Chabrol) - M. Homais - le pharmacien
- 1991: Les secrets professionnels du Dr Apfelglück - Germain l'escroc
- 1992: Le Bal des casse-pieds (directed by Yves Robert) - H 33
- 1992: Indochine (directed by Régis Wargnier) - Guy
- 1992: La Sévillane (directed by Jean-Philippe Toussaint) - Polougaievski
- 1992: L'Affaire Seznec (directed by Yves Boisset) - Quémeneur
- 1993: Pétain (directed by Jean Marbeuf) - Pierre Laval
- 1993: La Légende (directed by Jérôme Diamant-Berger) - Roland Pikas
- 1993: Fausto (directed by Remy Duchemin) - Mietek Breslauer
- 1993: Chacun pour toi (directed by Jean-Michel Ribes) - Georges Flavier
- 1993: Profil bas (directed by Claude Zidi) - Plana
- 1994: Regarde les hommes tomber (directed by Jacques Audiard) - Simon
- 1995: Le Hussard sur le toit (directed by Jean-Paul Rappeneau) - Le Colporteur
- 1996: Beaumarchais, l'insolent (directed by Édouard Molinaro) - Louis Goezman
- 1996: Enfants de salaud (directed by Tonie Marshall) - Julius Mandenne
- 1996: Désiré (directed by Bernard Murat) - Corniche
- 1996: Des nouvelles du bon Dieu (directed by Didier Le Pêcheur) - Louis-Albert Dieu
- 1996: Mo (directed by Yves-Noël François) - Ned Collins
- 1996: Fallait pas ! (directed by Gérard Jugnot) - Magic
- 1996: Victory (directed by Mark Peploe) - Mr. Schomberg
- 1997: Tenue correcte exigée (directed by Philippe Lioret) - M. Brucker - le directeur de l'hôtel
- 1998: La dame du jeu - Evaristo Della Porta
- 1999: Hygiène de l'assassin (directed by François Ruggieri) - Prétextat Tach
- 1999: Belle Maman (directed by Gabriel Aghion) - Paul
- 1999: Je règle mon pas sur le pas de mon père (directed by Rémi Waterhouse) - Bertrand
- 2000: Les Acteurs (directed by Bertrand Blier) - Dr. Belgoder
- 2001: Le Pacte des loups (Brotherhood of the Wolf) (directed by Christophe Gans) - Comte de Morangias
- 2001: Vertige de l'amour (directed by Laurent Chouchan) - Le beau-père
- 2002: Adolphe (directed by Benoît Jacquot) - The Count
- 2002: Féroce (directed by Gilles de Maistre) - Comte de Morangias
- 2002: Tamango (directed by Jean Roké Patoudem)
- 2003: Petites Coupures (directed by Pascal Bonitzer) - Gérard, l'oncle de Bruno
- 2002: Gomez et Tavarès (directed by Gilles Paquet-Brenner) - Tonton
- 2003: Les Thibault (TV Mini-Series) - Oscar Thibault
- 2004: Atomik circus: le retour de James Bataille (directed by Didier Poiraud and Thierry Poiraud)

=== Director ===
- 1972: Tout le monde il est beau, tout le monde il est gentil (Everybody's handsome, Everybody's Nice)
- 1972: Moi y'en a vouloir des sous
- 1973: Les Chinois à Paris
- 1975: Chobizenesse
- 1978: Je te tiens, tu me tiens par la barbichette
- 1982: Deux heures moins le quart avant Jésus-Christ
- 1984: Liberté, égalité, choucroute
