= Bertina Henrichs =

German writer (born 1966)

Bertina Henrichs (born 1966 in Frankfurt am Main) is a German writer who writes in French and lives in Paris.

== Life ==
Bertina Henrichs studied literature and film techniques in Berlin and France. With a thesis on writers who have adopted a foreign language in exile, she obtained her PhD in 1997 at Paris Diderot University. She lived in Paris from then on and wrote several screenplays, before making her debut as a writer in 2005 with the novel La Joueuse d'échecs. The story about a maid who discovered her passion for chess became a bestseller and appeared shortly after in 2007 under the title Die Schachspielerin selling something more than 50,000 copies. The eponymous film with Sandrine Bonnaire and Kevin Kline in the main roles was released in 2009 in a German-French co-production under the direction of Caroline Bottaro.

Bertina Henrichs has been a recipient of the Cezam Prix Littéraire Inter CE in 2003 and of the Corine Literature Prize in 2006.

== Works ==
- 2005: La Joueuse d’échecs
- 2008: That's all right mama
- 2010: Le Narcisse
- 2011: Le jardin
- 2013: Das Glück der blauen Stunde. Hoffmann und Campe, Hamburg 2013, ISBN 978-3-455-40376-3.
