= Haudepin =

Haudepin is a French surname. Notable people with the surname include:

- Didier Haudepin (born 1951), French actor, film producer, director, and screenwriter
- Sabine Haudepin (born 1955), French actress
