= Graduate First =

1978 film

- Theatrical release poster
- Directed by: Maurice Pialat
- Written by: Maurice Pialat
- Produced by: Maurice Pialat
- Starring: Sabine Haudepin
- Cinematography: Pierre-William Glenn; Jean-Paul Janssen
- Edited by: Sophie Coussein; Martine Giordano; Arlette Langmann
- Music by: Voyage
- Distributed by: AMLF
- Release date: 14 September 1978
- Running time: 86 minutes
- Country: France
- Language: French

Graduate First (French: Passe ton bac d'abord) is a 1978 French drama film directed by Maurice Pialat and starring Sabine Haudepin. The film is set in the north of France, in Lens, in a region profoundly affected by unemployment – the students, from modest backgrounds, try to forget their fears of what tomorrow will bring.

== Plot ==
The film is an "unsparing portrait of teenage life in the French suburbs [that] sees a group of schoolfriends adrift at the end of the 1970s. There's drama, violence, and pot-induced laughs, group holidays, indiscriminate sex, advances from teachers twenty-five years their seniors, attempted moves to Paris – and few prospects of passing the Baccalauréat, the final set of exams French students take before embarking into the world... to do what?

Marking the last work of Pialat's turbulent cycle of 1970s films, this is the sequel to the filmmaker's feature debut L'enfance nue (1969) – picked up again from a vantage point ten years on from the lives of the earlier film's protagonists."

== Cast ==
- Sabine Haudepin as Élisabeth
- Philippe Marlaud as Philippe
- Annick Alane as La mère (as Annik Alane)
- Michel Caron as Le père
- Christian Bouillette as Le vieux dragueur
- Bernard Tronczyk as Bernard
- Patrick Lepcynski as Patrick
- Valérie Chassigneux as Valérie
- Jean-François Adam as Le professeur de philosophie
- Agnès Makowiak as Agnès
- Charline Pourré as Charline
- Patrick Playez as Rocky, le marié
- Muriel Lacroix as Muriel
- Frédérique Cerbonnet as Frédérique
- Fabienne Neuville as La soeur d'Élizabeth
- Aline Fayard as La femme du patron

== Release ==
On 17 May 2016, Cohen Film Collection released Graduate First on DVD as part of their "Films of Maurice Pialat" collection.
