= Philippe Léotard =

French actor, poet and singer (1940–2001)

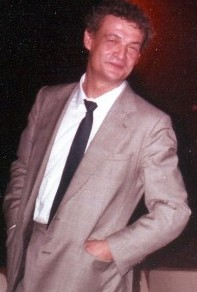
- Philippe Léotard, 1980s
- Born: Ange Philippe Paul André Léotard-Tomasi; 28 August 1940; Nice, France
- Died: 25 August 2001 (aged 60); 11th arrondissement of Paris, France
- Resting place: Montparnasse Cemetery
- Education: Lycée Henri-IV
- Spouse(s): Liliane Caulier (divorce 1972); Nathalie Baye (1972—1982)
- Relatives: François Léotard (brother)

Philippe Léotard (his full name was Ange Philippe Paul André Léotard-Tomasi; 28 August 1940 – 25 August 2001) was a French actor, poet and singer.

== Biography ==
He was born in Nice, one of seven children - four girls, then three boys, of which he was the oldest - and was the brother of politician François Léotard. His childhood was normal except for an illness (rheumatic fever) which struck him and forced him to spend days in bed during which time he read a great many books. He was particularly fond of the poets - Baudelaire, Rimbaud, Lautréamont, Blaise Cendrars. He met Ariane Mnouchkine at the Sorbonne and in 1964. Together with students of the L'École Internationale de Théâtre Jacques Lecoq, they formed the Parisian avant-garde stage ensemble, Théâtre du Soleil.

He played Philippe, the tormented son of a woman with terminal illness in the 1974 drama film La Gueule ouverte by the controversial director Maurice Pialat. He won a César Award for Best Actor for his role in the 1982 movie La Balance.

One of his few English-language roles was a cameo in the 1973 thriller The Day of the Jackal and he co-starred as "Jacques" in the 1975 John Frankenheimer movie French Connection II, the sequel to The French Connection, which starred Gene Hackman and Fernando Rey.

Léotard died of respiratory failure in Paris on 25 August 2001, three days before his 61st birthday. He was buried at the Montparnasse Cemetery in Paris.

== Filmography ==
Year	Title	Role	Director	Notes
1957	Paths of Glory	A Poilu	Stanley Kubrick	Uncredited
1970	Bed and Board	the drunkard	François Truffaut	Uncredited
1971	Max et les Ferrailleurs	Losfeld	Claude Sautet	
1971	Two English Girls	Diurka	François Truffaut	
1971	Le mot frère et le mot camarade			
1972	Rak	Lucien	Charles Belmont	
1972	To Be Twenty in the Aures	Lt. Perrin	René Vautier	
1972	A Gorgeous Girl Like Me	Clovis Bliss	François Truffaut	
1972	Le franc-tireur	Michel Perrat	Jean-Max Causse	
1973	Kamouraska	Antoine Tassy	Claude Jutra	
1973	The Day of the Jackal	Gendarme	Fred Zinnemann	
1974	Juliette and Juliette	Le dragueur de Juliette Vidal	Rémo Forlani	
1974	The Mouth Agape	Philippe	Maurice Pialat	
1974	The Middle of the World	Paul	Alain Tanner	
1975	Pas si méchant que ça	Julien	Claude Goretta	
1975	The Track	Paul Danville	Serge Leroy	
1975	French Connection II	Jacques	John Frankenheimer	
1975	La guerre du pétrole n'aura pas lieu	Padovani	Souheil Ben-Barka	
1975	Le Chat et la souris	Pierre Chemin	Claude Lelouch	
1976	The Good and the Bad	Le vendeur de Citroën	Claude Lelouch	
1976	Les conquistadores		Marco Pauly	
1977	Le Juge Fayard dit Le Shériff	Inspecteur Marec	Yves Boisset	
1977	Solemn Communion	Jacques Gravet	René Féret	
1977	Shadow of the Castles	Luigi	Daniel Duval	
1977	La comédie du train des pignes		François de Chavanes	
1978	Va voir maman, papa travaille	Vincent	François Leterrier	
1978	Judith Therpauve	Jean-Pierre Maurier	Patrice Chéreau	
1979	La Mémoire courte	Frank Barila	Eduardo de Gregorio	
1980	L'Empreinte des géants	Lucien Chabaud	Robert Enrico	
1980	A Week's Vacation	Doctor Sabouret	Bertrand Tavernier	
1980	The Little Mermaid	Georges Maréchal	Roger Andrieux	
1981	Les Babas Cool	Blaise	François Leterrier	
1982	Le Choc	Félix	Robin Davis	
1982	Paradis pour tous	Marc Lebel	Alain Jessua	
1982	La Balance	Dede Laffont	Bob Swaim	
1982	Mora	Mora	Léon Desclozeaux	
1983	Winter 1960	André	Thierry Michel	
1983	So Long, Stooge	Bauer	Claude Berri	
1984	Femmes de personne	Antoine	Christopher Frank	
1984	Les Fauves	Léandro Santini	Jean-Louis Daniel	
1984	The Pirate	Number 5	Jacques Doillon	
1984	Une rébellion à Romans	Jean Serve, dit 'Paulmier'	Philippe Venault	
1985	Tangos, l'exil de Gardel	Pierre	Fernando E. Solanas	
1985	Rouge-gorge	Louis Ducasse	Pierre Zucca	
1985	Farewell Blaireau	Fred	Bob Decout	
1985	Tangos, the Exile of Gardel	Pierre	Fernando E. Solanas	
1986	Dawn	Gad	Miklós Jancsó	
1986	Exit-exil	Duke	Luc Monheim	
1986	Le Paltoquet	The Honourable Tradesman	Michel Deville	
1986	State of Grace	Pierre-Julien	Jacques Rouffio	
1986	Ça n'arrive jamais			
1987	If the Sun Never Returns	Anzerul	Claude Goretta	
1988	Le testament d'un poète juif assassiné	Bernard Hauptmann	Frank Cassenti	
1988	Jane B. par Agnès V.	Le peintre / Murderer	Agnès Varda	
1988	South	Roberto	Fernando Ezequiel Solanas	
1988	The Abyss	Henri-Maximilien	André Delvaux	
1988	Snack Bar Budapest	Sapo	Tinto Brass	
1988	Ada dans la jungle	Rudi	Gérard Zingg	
1988	La Couleur du vent	Pierre	Pierre Granier-Deferre	
1990	Le grand ruban (Truck)	Jeff	Philippe Roussel	
1990	Il y a des jours... et des lunes	Le chanteur abandonné / The abandoned singer	Claude Lelouch	
1990	Le dénommé (Oublie que tu es un homme)	Auclair	Jean-Claude Dague	
1990	In the Eye of the Snake	Phil Anzer - Marc's Father	Max Reid	
1990	Death of a Schoolboy	Dr. Levin	Peter Patzak	
1991	The Flesh	Nicola	Marco Ferreri	
1992	Ville à vendre	Jean Boulard - un kinésithérapeute	Jean-Pierre Mocky	
1995	Pandora	Raúl	António da Cunha Telles	
1995	Élisa	Gitane Smoker	Jean Becker	
1995	Les Misérables	Thénardier	Claude Lelouch	
1995	Philippe Léotard chante et parle	Himself	Nils Tavernier	
1997	Black Dju	Inspecteur Plettschette	Pol Cruchten	
1997	Gueules d'amour	Philippe Dajoux		

== Discography ==
- 1990: À l'amour comme à la guerre
- 1994: Philippe Léotard chante Léo Ferré (tribute album)
- 1996: Je rêve que je dors
- 2000: Demi-mots amers
