= Under the Sun of Satan (film) =

1987 film directed by Maurice Pialat

- Original film poster
- French: Sous le soleil de Satan
- Directed by: Maurice Pialat
- Screenplay by: Sylvie Danton; Maurice Pialat
- Based on: Under the Sun of Satan by Georges Bernanos
- Produced by: Claude Abeille; Daniel Toscan du Plantier
- Starring: Gérard Depardieu; Sandrine Bonnaire; Maurice Pialat
- Cinematography: Willy Kurant
- Edited by: Yann Dedet
- Music by: Henri Dutilleux
- Production companies: Erato Films; Films A2; Flach Films; Action Films Gaumont
- Distributed by: Gaumont
- Release dates: 14 May 1987 (Cannes); 2 September 1987
- Running time: 93 minutes
- Country: France
- Language: French

Under the Sun of Satan (French: Sous le soleil de Satan) is a 1987 French drama film directed by Maurice Pialat, starring Gérard Depardieu, Sandrine Bonnaire and Pialat himself. It is based on the 1926 novel of the same name by Georges Bernanos. Set in the countryside of northern France in the 1920s, it tells the story of a tormented young priest who has spiritual gifts but agonises over what good he can do in a world under the grip of evil. The film won the Palme d'Or at the 1987 Cannes Film Festival.

== Plot ==
Newly ordained as a Catholic priest, Donissan is sent to a rural parish under the care of the experienced Menou-Segrais. The young man is tortured by doubts about his vocation and has taken to flagellating himself. When he confesses to Menou-Segaris how unworthy he feels at his chosen task, the older man says it is not too late to choose another career but he can see in Donissan a great power for good.

A parishioner called Mouchette, the 16-year-old daughter of a brewer, calls on one of her lovers, a marquis called Cadignan. She says she wants to run away to Paris, but he says he is facing financial ruin and cannot offer much help. He lets her stay the night, however, and in the morning she starts playing with his shotgun. It is loaded and he is killed. She gets out fast, washing his blood off her clothes.

She then goes round to another lover, a married doctor called Gallet. After making love, she tells him what she has done and adds that she is pregnant. He says she need not worry about Cadignan, because the death has been certified as suicide, but he is not the father of her child and will not help her with an abortion.

Menou-Segrais, worried at his parishioners' discomfort with Donissan, sends the young man to help in another village. Walking there over the fields in the dark, he is joined by a mysterious horse-trader who turns out to be an incarnation of Satan. Unable to seduce Donissan physically or spiritually, he says the young man has the gift of seeing into souls.

Donissan faints, only coming to in the morning, when he encounters Mouchette wandering in the fields. He tells her that he can see her life and thoughts and that she must repent for her sin of killing Cadignan. She goes back to her parents' house and cuts her throat with a razor. Fearing the worst, Donissan goes there and finds her body. He carries it bleeding to the church, where he lays it before the altar in the hope that her soul will be saved.

This outrageous behaviour earns him a transfer to another parish, where the people begin to recognise that he is a holy man though he is still in spiritual turmoil. A farmer from a neighbouring village asks him to come to his little son who is dying. Arriving too late, his first impulse is to leave but he then realises that the people expect more. Going alone to the bedroom, he lifts the corpse up and, as he prays, the child's eyes open.

The strain of his mental torments and the demands of his parishioners make him increasingly ill. One night he is attacked by Satan, and asks God to keep him alive if there is still use for him. He recovers and returns to the church to hear confessions. Menou-Segrais has come over to see how he is and, after the last parishioner leaves, goes to the confessional box. Inside he finds Donissan dead.

== Cast ==
- Gérard Depardieu as Donissan
- Sandrine Bonnaire as Mouchette
- Maurice Pialat as Menou-Segrais
- Alain Artur as Cadignan
- Yann Dedet as Gallet
- Brigitte Legendre as Mouchette's mother
- Jean-Claude Bourlat as Malorthy
- Jean-Christophe Bouvet as Horse dealer
- Philippe Pallut as Quarryman
- Marcel Anselin as Bishop Gerbier
- Yvette Lavogez as Marthe
- Pierre d'Hoffelize as Havret
- Corinne Bourdon as Child's mother
- Thierry Der'ven as Sabroux
- Marie-Antoinette Lorge as Estelle

== Production ==
The film is based on the 1926 novel Under the Sun of Satan by Georges Bernanos. It was the third time a novel by Bernanos was adapted for film. The two previous adaptations, Diary of a Country Priest (1951) and Mouchette (1967), had both been directed by Robert Bresson. Under the Sun of Satan was produced through Erato Films, Films A2, Flach Films and Action Films. Filming began on 20 October 1986 and took place in Fressin and Montreuil-sur-Mer, Pas-de-Calais.

== Release ==
The film premiered on 14 May at the 1987 Cannes Film Festival, where it was met by boos and whistles from the audience. It also played at the Toronto International Film Festival and New York Film Festival the same year. It was released in French cinemas on 2 September 1987. The film had 815,748 admissions in France.

== Reception ==
=== Critical response ===
Janet Maslin wrote in The New York Times in 1987:

"Though it deals with theology and rises to a stunning test of faith, Under Satan's Sun has a thoroughly secular style. That's one of the many things that make it fascinating. It's a work of great subtlety, some difficulty and tremendous assurance, one that demands and deserves close attention."

Nigel Floyd wrote in Time Out London:

"Pialat's ascetic meditation on faith, sainthood, and the nature of evil is a film of shattering intensity. ... Through the coldly-lit images and restrained flesh-and-blood performances, self-confessed atheist Pialat insists on the absolute reality of events, an approach which allows something intangible (spiritual?) to seep in at the edges of the frame. Despite the confusing cutting from scene to scene, the narrative's rigorous logic, the performances, and the stark visual beauty yield profound pleasures."

Stanley Kauffmann of The New Republic wrote "It's the finest French film since Therese and Vagabond."

=== Accolades ===
The film won the Palme d'Or, the top prize for best film in competition at the Cannes Film Festival. It was the first time in 21 years that the Palme d'Or went to a French film; Claude Lelouch had last won it in 1966 for A Man and a Woman. Pialat was congratulated by French President François Mitterrand, who wrote that Under the Sun of Satan "shows the vitality that can and should characterize French cinema". The film was nominated for the César Award for best film, director, actor (Depardieu), actress (Bonnaire), cinematography, editing and poster.

== Home media ==
In 2013, the film was released as a Blu-ray disc playable in all regions.
