= Yann Moulier-Boutang =

French economist, essayist, and journalist (born 1949)

Yann Moulier-Boutang (born 19 June 1949, in Boulogne-Billancourt) is a French economist, essayist, and journalist, best known for his book Cognitive Capitalism (2004) and as the founder of the Camarades magazine in 1974. A graduate of the École normale supérieure in Paris, he is also a professor of economics at the University of Technology of Compiègne, and at Sciences Po. A member of the Greens party, he is the son of philosopher Pierre Boutang and half-brother of filmmaker Pierre-André Boutang.
