= Queen to Play =

2009 film by Caroline Bottaro

- Directed by: Caroline Bottaro
- Screenplay by: Caroline Bottaro
- Based on: La Joueuse d’échecs by Bertina Henrichs
- Produced by: Dominique Besnehard; Michel Feller; Jean-Philippe Laroche; Amelie Latscha
- Starring: Sandrine Bonnaire; Kevin Kline; Valérie Lagrange
- Cinematography: Jean-Claude Larrieu
- Edited by: Tina Baz
- Music by: Nicola Piovani
- Production company: StudioCanal
- Distributed by: Zeitgeist Films (USA)
- Release date: August 5, 2009 (France)
- Running time: 96 minutes
- Country: France
- Language: French

Queen to Play (original title Joueuse, the feminine form of “player”) is a 2009 French-German film directed by Caroline Bottaro. It is based on the novel La Joueuse d’échecs by Bertina Henrichs.

== Synopsis ==
The film stars Sandrine Bonnaire as a French chambermaid on the island of Corsica. She develops an interest in chess. She has been cleaning the house of an American doctor (played by Kevin Kline in his first French-speaking role), and he begins helping her practice and improve. She must deal with her growing fascination with the game and with her husband and teenaged daughter.

== Cast ==
- Sandrine Bonnaire as Hélène
- Kevin Kline as Kröger
- Valérie Lagrange as Maria
- Francis Renaud as Ange
- Alexandra Gentil as Lisa
- Alice Pol as Natalia
- Didier Ferrari as Jacky
- Laurence Colussi as Pina
- Élisabeth Vitali as Marie-Jeanne
- Daniel Martin as The President of the Chess Club
- Dominic Gould as L'Américain
- Jennifer Beals as L'Américaine

== Awards ==
- 2010: Special Mention for John Schlesinger Award for Outstanding First Feature Palm Springs International Film Festival
- 2009: Official Selection Tribeca Film Festival

== Release ==
The film had its world premiere on April 25, 2009 in both New York City and Los Angeles, at the Tribeca Film Festival and the ColCoa Film Festival respectively. The national release in France was on August 5, 2009 and in Germany on January 7, 2010. The film is distributed in the U.S. by Zeitgeist Films and was released there on April 1, 2011.
