= Cunlhat =

- Commune
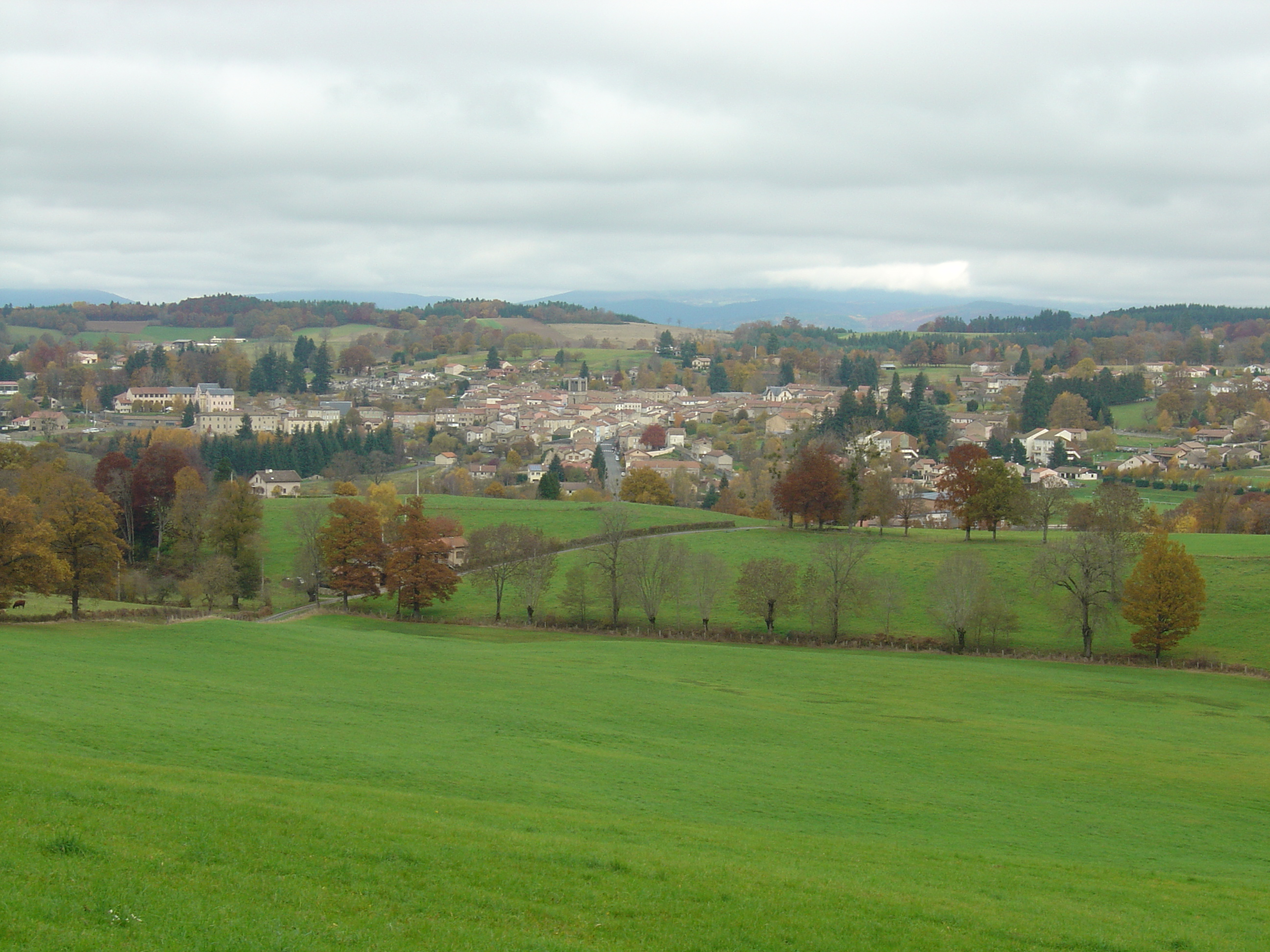
- A general view of Cunlhat

- Coat of arms
- Location of Cunlhat
- Location within France Location within Auvergne-Rhône-Alpes
- Coordinates: 45°37′58″N 3°33′36″E
- Country: France
- Region: Auvergne-Rhône-Alpes
- Department: Puy-de-Dôme
- Arrondissement: Ambert
- Canton: Les Monts du Livradois

Government
  - Mayor (2024–2026): Claudine De Vos
- Area^{1}: 29.55 km^{2} (11.41 sq mi)
- Elevation: 700 m (2,300 ft)
- Highest elevation: 1,014 m (3,327 ft)
- Lowest elevation: 540 m (1,770 ft)
- Population (2023): 1,290
  - Density: 43.7/km^{2} (113/sq mi)
- Time zone: UTC+01:00 (CET)
  - Summer (DST): UTC+02:00 (CEST)
- INSEE/Postal code: 63132 /63590
- ^{1} French Land Register data, which excludes lakes, ponds, glaciers > 1 km^{2} (0.386 sq mi or 247 acres) and river estuaries.

Cunlhat ([kœ̃.ja]) is a commune in the Puy-de-Dôme department in Auvergne-Rhône-Alpes in central France.

== People ==
Cunlhat was the birthplace of Maurice Pialat (1925–2003), film director and actor.

== See also ==
- Communes of the Puy-de-Dôme department
