= Un égale trois =

French television show

- Country of origin: France
- Original language: French

Production
- Camera setup: Multi-camera
- Running time: 22–24 minutes

Original release
- Network: RTF
- Release: January 27 – June 8, 1964

Un égale trois (or 1= 3) is a French comedy television show created by Jacques Martin and Jean Yanne and was broadcast on RTF from January to June 1964. It was produced by Radiodiffusion-Télévision Française (RTF).

== Controversy ==
A controversial sketch was broadcast in March 1964 where Jean Yanne and Jacques Martin did a skit involving the Battle of Waterloo in the form of a bicycle race.
