= À Nos Amours =

1983 film by Maurice Pialat

- Theatrical release poster
- Directed by: Maurice Pialat
- Written by: Arlette Langmann; Maurice Pialat
- Produced by: Micheline Pialat
- Starring: Sandrine Bonnaire; Dominique Besnehard; Évelyne Ker; Anne-Sophie Maillé; Cyr Boitard; Christophe Odent; Maïté Maillé; Pierre-Loup Rajot; Cyril Collard
- Cinematography: Jacques Loiseleux
- Edited by: Yann Dedet; Sophie Coussein; Valérie Condroyer
- Music by: Klaus Nomi
- Production companies: Les Films du Livradois; Gaumont; France 3 Cinéma
- Distributed by: Gaumont Distribution
- Release date: 16 November 1983
- Running time: 95 minutes
- Country: France
- Language: French
- Box office: 952,082 admissions (France)

À Nos Amours (French pronunciation: [a noz‿amuʁ], To Our Loves) is a 1983 French coming-of-age drama film directed by Maurice Pialat, who co-wrote the screenplay with Arlette Langmann. It stars Sandrine Bonnaire, Dominique Besnehard, Évelyne Ker, Anne-Sophie Maillé, Cyr Boitard, Christophe Odent, Maïté Maillé, Pierre-Loup Rajot and Cyril Collard. The plot follows a 16-year-old girl, Suzanne (Bonnaire), as she experiences her sexual awakening and becomes promiscuous to escape her troubled home life. À Nos Amours won the César Award for Best Film in 1984.

== Plot ==
Suzanne is a 16-year-old girl who lives in an apartment in Paris with her furrier parents and her older brother Robert, a writer. While staying at a summer camp with her friends, she sneaks out to meet her boyfriend Luc. When she rebuffs Luc's sexual advances, he assumes she is tired of him and complains about not seeing her as often as he would like. At a bar that night, Suzanne meets an American teenage boy and later loses her virginity to him. In the morning, she feels guilty for cheating on Luc, but after returning to Paris, she breaks up with him and becomes increasingly promiscuous.

Suzanne is close to her father, but he reacts with suspicion and violence when she goes on a double date with her cousin Solange. Suzanne has sex with a young man named Bernard that night, and when she returns home, her father expresses concern with her changing demeanor, saying she used to smile more and seems increasingly bored. He also discloses he has met another woman and is planning to leave the family. Luc attempts to reconcile with Suzanne, but she rejects him and accuses him of wanting to have sex with her only because he knows she has done it with others. Suzanne continues her affair with Bernard, though she admits she is unable to feel love.

Following the father's departure, Robert steps in as the head of the family and becomes protective of the increasingly unstable mother, who berates Suzanne for her skimpy clothes and rebellious behaviour. Suzanne confronts her mother about confiscating her letters from Bernard, leading to an argument in which Suzanne's mother and brother both beat her. Suzanne goes out to meet her friends and Bernard that night, and when she returns home the next morning, Robert beats her and blames her for their mother's hysteria. Suzanne later tells Robert she has decided to go to boarding school, saying she cannot stand living with their mother and has contemplated suicide. She declares she is only happy when she is with a man; Robert professes an inability to understand this.

Suzanne soon begins a more serious relationship with a young man named Jean-Pierre. After Robert repeatedly beats Suzanne one night, accusing her of being promiscuous, Jean-Pierre confronts Robert about the incident. Although Robert warns Jean-Pierre about Suzanne's propensity to date multiple men, Suzanne and Jean-Pierre become engaged. Meanwhile, Luc reappears and insists he never stopped loving Suzanne. Though she confesses she has considered calling off the wedding, she tells Luc she has changed and that Jean-Pierre provides her with inner peace for the first time.

Six months after the wedding, Suzanne and Jean-Pierre are having a dinner party at the apartment with Suzanne's mother, Robert, his wife, his brother-in-law and his friend Michel, who makes discreet sexual advances towards Suzanne. The father unexpectedly arrives to have the apartment surveyed, revealing his intention to sell it. Sitting at the table, he makes snide remarks towards the family—particularly Robert and his brother-in-law—and reveals Suzanne has been visiting him. The mother angrily throws the father out of the apartment.

Some time later, Suzanne's father accompanies her to the airport before she departs for San Diego with Michel for their honeymoon, having broken up with Jean-Pierre. Her father surmises that she will never be able to love anyone, telling her, "You think you're in love, but you just want to be loved." He advises her to stay in San Diego, and they say goodbye before Suzanne boards the plane with Michel.

== Cast ==
- Sandrine Bonnaire as Suzanne
- Évelyne Ker as the mother
- Dominique Besnehard as Robert
- Maurice Pialat as the father
- Anne-Sophie Maillé as Anne
- Maïté Maillé as Martine
- Christophe Odent as Michel
- Pierre-Loup Rajot as Bernard
- Cyr Boitard as Luc
- Cyril Collard as Jean-Pierre
- Tom Stevens as the American

== Production ==
The genesis of the film was Arlette Langmann's screenplay Les filles du faubourg, which Pialat said was written in the 1970s and set in the 1960s, and would have made a three- to four-hour film. After pitching the screenplay to the National Center of Cinematography and Gaumont around 1975, Pialat began seeking funds to shoot it when his project Les Meurtrières began to flounder.

In Les Filles du faubourg, the characters are Polish Jews, but Pialat minimized the family's heritage to brief references. Due to the small budget, Pialat aborted the period drama element, moving the setting from the 1960s to the present but keeping some of the art design and avoiding mentions of politics or contraception.

In the film, Bonnaire's character, Suzanne, loses her virginity to the American, the character played by Tom Stevens. Bonnaire herself had introduced Stevens to Pialat, having met him shortly before during a brief vacation in England, and the two actors then became engaged (their relationship lasted two years).

== Reception ==
The New York Times journalist Jason Bailey called the film "challenging" with "a freewheeling, languorous vibe". Dave Kehr cited it as "a particularly destabilizing example" of cinematic "immediacy". Time Out listed it 38th in its 100 Best French Films, citing a "moving" depiction of the father-daughter relationship and "The message may be that happiness is as rare as a sunny day, and sorrow is forever". Richard Brody hailed Bonnaire for an "explosive début".

=== Accolades ===
The film won the Louis Delluc Prize for Best Film in 1983 and the César Award for Best Film in 1984. Bonnaire was also awarded the César Award in 1984 for Most Promising Actress for her work in the film. The film was also entered into the 34th Berlin International Film Festival.
