= Alain Maline =

French film director, producer, and screenwriter (1947–2025)

- Born: 2 August 1947
- Died: 7 February 2025 (aged 77)
- Occupation(s): Film director Film producer Screenwriter

Alain Maline (2 August 1947 – 7 February 2025) was a French film director, producer, and screenwriter.

== Life and career ==
Born on 2 August 1947, Maline completed an apprenticeship as an assistant director under François Truffaut and Claude Lelouch. After working on a number of films as an assistant, he directed his first film, Ni avec toi ni sans toi, in 1984. He met Jean Yanne during the filming of Attention bandits!. The two collaborated for the film Cayenne Palace, but it was a financial disaster. He then set up his own production studio, notably releasing the film Jean Galmot, aventurier in 1990.

Maline died on 7 February 2025, at the age of 77.
