= Maddened by His Absence =

- Theatrical release poster
- Directed by: Sandrine Bonnaire
- Written by: Sandrine Bonnaire; Jerome Tonnerre
- Produced by: Dominique Besnehard; Michel Feller; Thomas Schmitt; Nicolas Steil; Jesus Gonzalez
- Starring: William Hurt; Alexandra Lamy; Augustin Legrand
- Cinematography: Philippe Guilbert
- Edited by: Svetlana Vaynblat
- Music by: André Dziezuk
- Distributed by: Ad Vitam
- Release date: May 2012 (Cannes)
- Running time: 98 minutes
- Countries: France; Luxembourg; Belgium
- Languages: English; French

Maddened by His Absence (also titled J’enrage de son absence) is a 2012 drama film written by Sandrine Bonnaire and Jerome Tonnerre, directed by Bonnaire and starring William Hurt, Alexandra Lamy and Augustin Legrand.

== Cast ==
- William Hurt as Jacques
- Alexandra Lamy as Mado
- Augustin Legrand as Stéphane
- Jalil Mehenni as Paul
- Matteo Trevisan as Félix
- Francoise Oriane as Geneviève
- Norbert Rutili as Le notaire

== Release ==
The film premiered at the Cannes Film Festival in May 2012.

== Reception ==
Brendan Kelly of the Montreal Gazette awarded the film four stars out of five, calling it "a remarkably assured directorial debut."
