= L'Abécédaire de Gilles Deleuze =

- Genre: Documentary
- Country of origin: France
- Original language: French

Production
- Producer: Pierre-André Boutang
- Running time: 8 hours

Original release
- Release: 1996

L'Abécédaire de Gilles Deleuze (“Gilles Deleuze's alphabet book”) is a French television program produced by Pierre-André Boutang in 1988–1989, consisting of an eight-hour series of interviews between Gilles Deleuze and Claire Parnet.

== Themes ==
- A for Animal (English: Animal)
- B for Boisson (English: Drink)
- C for Culture (English: Culture)
- D for Désir (English: Desire)
- E for Enfance (English: Childhood)
- F for Fidélité (English: Loyalty)
- G for Gauche (English: Left-wing politics)
- H for Histoire de la Philosophie (English: History of philosophy)
- I for Idée (English: Idea)
- J for Joie (English: Joy)
- K for Kant (English: Immanuel Kant)
- L for Littérature (English: Literature)
- M for Maladie (English: Disease)
- N for Neurologie (English: Neurology)
- O for Opéra (English: Opera)
- P for Professeur (English: Professor)
- Q for Question (English: Question)
- R for Résistance (English: Resistance movement)
- S for Style (English: Style)
- T for Tennis (English: Tennis)
- U for Un (English: One)
- V for Voyage (English: Travel)
- W for Wittgenstein (English: Ludwig Wittgenstein)
- X and Y for Inconnues (English: Variables)
- Z for Zig-zag
