= The Mouth Agape =

1974 French tragedy film by Maurice Pialat

- Theatrical release poster
- Directed by: Maurice Pialat
- Written by: Maurice Pialat
- Produced by: André Génovès; Maurice Pialat; Micheline Pialat
- Starring: Hubert Deschamps; Monique Mélinand; Philippe Léotard; Nathalie Baye; Henri Salquin; Alain Grestau; Anna Gayane
- Cinematography: Néstor Almendros
- Edited by: Bernard Dubois; Arlette Langmann
- Distributed by: Les Films La Boëtie
- Release date: 1974
- Running time: 82 minutes
- Country: France
- Language: French

The Mouth Agape (French: La Gueule Ouverte) is a 1974 French tragedy film directed by Maurice Pialat. It depicts, in a cinematic realist fashion, a woman going through a terminal illness and also dealing with the tumultuous lives of her husband and son. It was one of the least commercially successful of Pialat's films. It was the third film of the ten that he directed before his death in January 2003. It is also known under the titles The Gaping Mouth and The Gaping Maw.

The film stars Monique Mélinand, Philippe Léotard, Hubert Deschamps, and Nathalie Baye in the main roles. Néstor Almendros, the Spanish cinematographer known for working with the Nouvelle Vague directors François Truffaut and Éric Rohmer, collaborated with Pialat for the first time on The Mouth Agape. The title is a poetic reference to the open mouth position sometimes found in corpses.

== Plot ==
Monique Mélinand portrays a woman in the late stages of terminal illness. Her son Philippe, Philippe's wife Nathalie, and her husband Roger (Hubert Deschamps) attempt to comfort her as she navigates through her ordeal. However, those two closest men in her personal life begin to get more involved in their relationships with multiple mistresses. Her husband flirts with customers in their clothing and haberdashery store while her son flirts with her nurses. The film incorporates elements of Mozart's opera Così fan tutte to poetic effect, relating to these scenes. In the end scenes, she goes through several final, deeply emotional moments as the disease claims her life.

== Release ==
On 17 May 2016, Cohen Film Collection released The Mouth Agape on DVD as part of their "Films of Maurice Pialat" collection.

== Reception and legacy ==
La gueule ouverte was one of the least commercially successful of Pialat's films.

Some critics have viewed the film as semi-autobiographical, and it was described as such in a Masters of Cinema re-release. Pialat's mother died in the same real place as the one depicted in the film, and the Philippe character is somewhat similar to Pialat himself such that he could be an author surrogate.

Critic Noel Megahey of the cinema website The Digital Fix has described the film as having "[a] such intensity and uncommon brutal honesty about a subject that is usually treated with more delicacy and sensitivity that it can be difficult and challenging to the viewer" but that "the effort is certainly rewarded". Critic Jonathan McCalmont of the arts website Ruthless Culture has labeled the film as one of Pilat's most "intrusive" works. McCalmont has also stated that "One of the things that is most fascinating about Pialat as a director is that though completely devoid of sentimentality, his work also shows a perpetual awareness of the temptations that it offers... [its] lack of sentimentality presents itself as a ruthless focus upon the present."

The protagonist, during a medical exam about her illness

Critic Miguel Marías of the film journal Senses of Cinema has praised the film, and commented that:

The film shows without the slightest trace of sublimation, self-pity or sentimentality what it really is to stand in hopeless, powerless watch for hours, days or even months, feeling inadequate and useless while tiredly sitting near a bedside or restlessly walking up and down, aimlessly, like a caged tiger around the house, waiting for the once and still (or perhaps again) loved one to die. This figure is probably in pain, or suffering from some sort of physical or psychic decay, and is unable to speak fluently or even to breathe. These are the sorts of things one rather chooses to ignore or forget and does not want to think about, or which one knows directly from close quarters experience.

Director Michael Haneke has cited the film as being in his top 10 favourite films of all time.

== See also ==
- End-of-life care
- Artistic realism
- List of French films of 1974
- List of Masters of Cinema releases
