= Loulou (film) =

1980 film by Maurice Pialat

- Film poster
- Directed by: Maurice Pialat
- Written by: Arlette Langmann; Maurice Pialat
- Starring: Isabelle Huppert; Gérard Depardieu
- Cinematography: Pierre-William Glenn; Jacques Loiseleux
- Edited by: Sophie Coussein; Yann Dedet
- Music by: Philippe Sarde
- Distributed by: Gaumont Distribution
- Release date: 3 September 1980
- Running time: 110 minutes
- Country: France
- Language: French

Loulou is a 1980 French drama film directed by Maurice Pialat and starring Isabelle Huppert and Gérard Depardieu. For Loulou, Pialat was nominated for the Golden Palm award at the 1980 Cannes Film Festival.

== Plot ==
Nelly, a young middle-class woman, is married to André, an older, cultured man owns the small advertising agency where she works. While at a disco with André, Nelly meets Louis a.k.a. Loulou, a hoodlum who has just been released from prison. During their drunken encounter, she develops an attraction for Loulou’s rugged manliness: after spending the night with him in a hotel, she returns home the next day only to be kicked by André out of their spacious apartment. Consequently, she moves into a hotel room with Loulou, whom she has to support financially as he refuses to work.

When Nelly becomes pregnant, she rents a small apartment for the two of them. However, Loulou quickly fills it with his criminal associates, who even pressure her into joining them for a burglary one night. Although her well-off brother tries to make her see sense, Nelly remains fiercely committed to Loulou and their unborn child. The turning point occurs when Loulou and his gang take Nelly to a Sunday lunch with his mother. The gathering descends into chaos during a terrifying confrontation with his psychotic brother-in-law, who begins firing a shotgun.

Finally realizing the impossibility of raising a child in such a dangerous environment, Nelly decides to have an abortion. Though Loulou is deeply hurt by her choice, the film ultimately ends exactly as it began: with the two of them staggering home drunk.

== Cast ==
- Isabelle Huppert as Nelly
- Gérard Depardieu as Loulou
- Guy Marchand as André
- Humbert Balsan as Michel
- Bernard Tronczak as Rémy
- Christian Boucher as Peirot
- Frédérique Cerbonnet as Dominique
- Jacqueline Dufranne as Mémère
- Willy Safar as Jean-Louis
- Agnès Rosier as Cathy
- Patricia Coulet as Marité
- Jean-Claude Meilland as Jean-Claude, le gars du casse
- Patrick Playez as Thomas
- Gérald Garnier as Lulu
- Catherine De Guirchitch as Marie-Jo
- Jean Van Herzeele as René
- Patrick Poivey as Philippe
- Xavier Saint-Macary as Bernard

== Release ==
Loulou received its screening at the New York Film Festival on 8 October 1980. On 17 May 2016, Cohen Film Collection released Loulou on DVD as part of their "Films of Maurice Pialat" collection.

== Reception ==
The review aggregator website Rotten Tomatoes gives the film a score of 88%, based on eight reviews, with an average rating of 7.4 out of 10.

When the film was released on DVD, Peter Bradshaw of The Guardian wrote "There is something a little dated about the movie's look now; it is, however, effortlessly watchable." Matthew Leyland of BBC writes, "So much potential for melodrama, yet Pialat never makes us feel like we're watching a soap opera."

Time Out called it, "challenging, absorbing example of the awkward beauty." On 8 February 2024, Time Out ranked it as number 67 on its list of "The 100 best French movies of all time".
