= La maison des bois =

- Genre: Period drama
- Written by: René Wheeler
- Directed by: Maurice Pialat
- Starring: Pierre Doris
- Countries of origin: France; Italy
- Original language: French
- No. of seasons: 1
- No. of episodes: 7

Production
- Running time: 380 minutes
- Production companies: Office de Radiodiffusion Télévision Française; RAI Radiotelevisione Italiana

Original release
- Release: 11 September – 24 October 1971

La maison des bois (engl. The house in the woods) is a 1971 French mini-series, consisting of seven episodes. It was directed by Maurice Pialat and written by René Wheeler, starring Pierre Doris, Jacqueline Dufranne, and Agathe Natanson.

The mini-series takes place during World War I and tells about the daily life in a French village.

Gaumont has released the mini-series on DVD in 2005. In 2024, a 4K restoration of the series was performed by the French National Video Institute. The restoration was released in American theaters in 2026 by Janus Films.

== Plot ==
During the "Great War", many French families have sent their children from Paris to live in the relative safety of the countryside. Three such boys - Hervé, Michel, and Albert, or "Bébert" - live with groundskeeper Albert Picard, his wife, Jeanne, and his teenaged son and daughter Marcel and Marguerite in a rustic village in Oise, north of Paris. The Picard house itself is in the woods away from the town, and the boys spend their free time wandering, exploring, and playing in the forest, and fishing in its waterways.

The series begins in 1917, several years after the boys arrived in the Picard household, and its first several hours trace their routine interactions with the Picard family and the town. Although now schoolboys, Hervé, Michel, and Bébert were young enough when they came to the household that they have difficulty remembering their fathers (who are off at the front). The warm-hearted Albert and Jeanne treat them as their own sons. Michel and Bébert's families pay the Picards for housing their sons, and their mothers visit, write to them, and send them packages regularly. By contrast, Hervé's mother abandoned him at the Picard household in the process of leaving his father, Paul. The Picards gladly house him too, but he feels jealous of the attention Michel and Bébert receive, which leads him to at once lash out at them (at one point destroying letters sent to them by their mothers) and cultivate a unique bond with the Picards. Hervé does not remember either of his parents and has barely heard from them in the years he has spent with the Picards.

Meanwhile, the villagers try to continue their normal lives. Marguerite is wooed by local peasant boy Jacques, to Albert's irritation. The local nobleman and Albert's employer, a Marquis, loses his much younger wife in a carriage accident and becomes a recluse. Hervé makes his acquaintance; the Marquis, elderly and childless, takes a liking to him. The boys attend a local school and learn their lessons (colored by nationalist and revanchist rhetoric) from a considerate if disciplinarian teacher. Sensitive to Hervé's loneliness, Albert (a reserve army soldier) robs an officer's canteen of food to give to Hervé, but he is shot by his own comrades in the attempt. The Marquis helps Albert craft a cover story that he was chasing the thief instead. Later, the family has a riverside picnic, which Hervé accidentally complicates, as the letters he destroyed announced that Michel and Bébert's mothers will be visiting that same day.

Eventually, war comes to the village. Marcel comes of age, is drafted, and gets sent to the front. The boys make the acquaintance of soldiers, and Hervé in particular befriends a lieutenant who flies him around the village in a biplane. The lieutenant later shoots down a German plane over the village, thrilling and frightening most of its residents. At one point, the front lines threaten to move close enough to the village that the residents prepare to evacuate. Hervé's father Paul, finally given leave, visits the family and brings news that he has remarried. Albert discreetly informs Paul that he has concealed the news that Marcel has been sent to the Somme. Shortly afterwards, Marcel is killed in combat, devastating the family. Albert and Jeanne are still in mourning when, a year later, the armistice is announced, the war ends, and French troops return home. The two realize that, with Marcel dead, Marguerite married to Jacques, and the boys returned to their homes, they will have no one to look after.

Michel and Bébert leave the Picard household and, it is implied, quickly forget their years there. Hervé, meanwhile, has grown to love the Picards as his real family, and finds his new urban life in Paris and Paul's marital strife unbearable. A chance meeting with Albert reveals that Jeanne has developed a terminal illness and has lost the will to live. Hervé runs away, returning by train to the village. He runs back to the Picard house, and visits the Marquis, Jeanne, and finally Albert one last time.

== Cast ==
- Pierre Doris as Albert Picard
- Jacqueline Dufranne as Jeanne Picard
- Agathe Natanson as Marguerite Picard
- Henri Puff as Marcel Picard
- Hervé Lévy as Hervé
- Michel Tarrazon as Michel Latour
- Albert Martinez as Albert "Bébert" Pouilly
- Fernand Gravey as the Marquis
- Maurice Pialat as the Schoolteacher
- Ovila Légaré as the priest
- Alexandre Rignault as Birot, the mayor
- Philippe Andre as Jacques, Marguerite's suitor
- Micha Bayard as Michel's mother
- Marie-Christine Boulart as Bébert's mother
- Paul Crauchet as Paul, Hervé's father
- Barbara Laage as Hélène, Paul's wife
