= Morsains =

- Commune
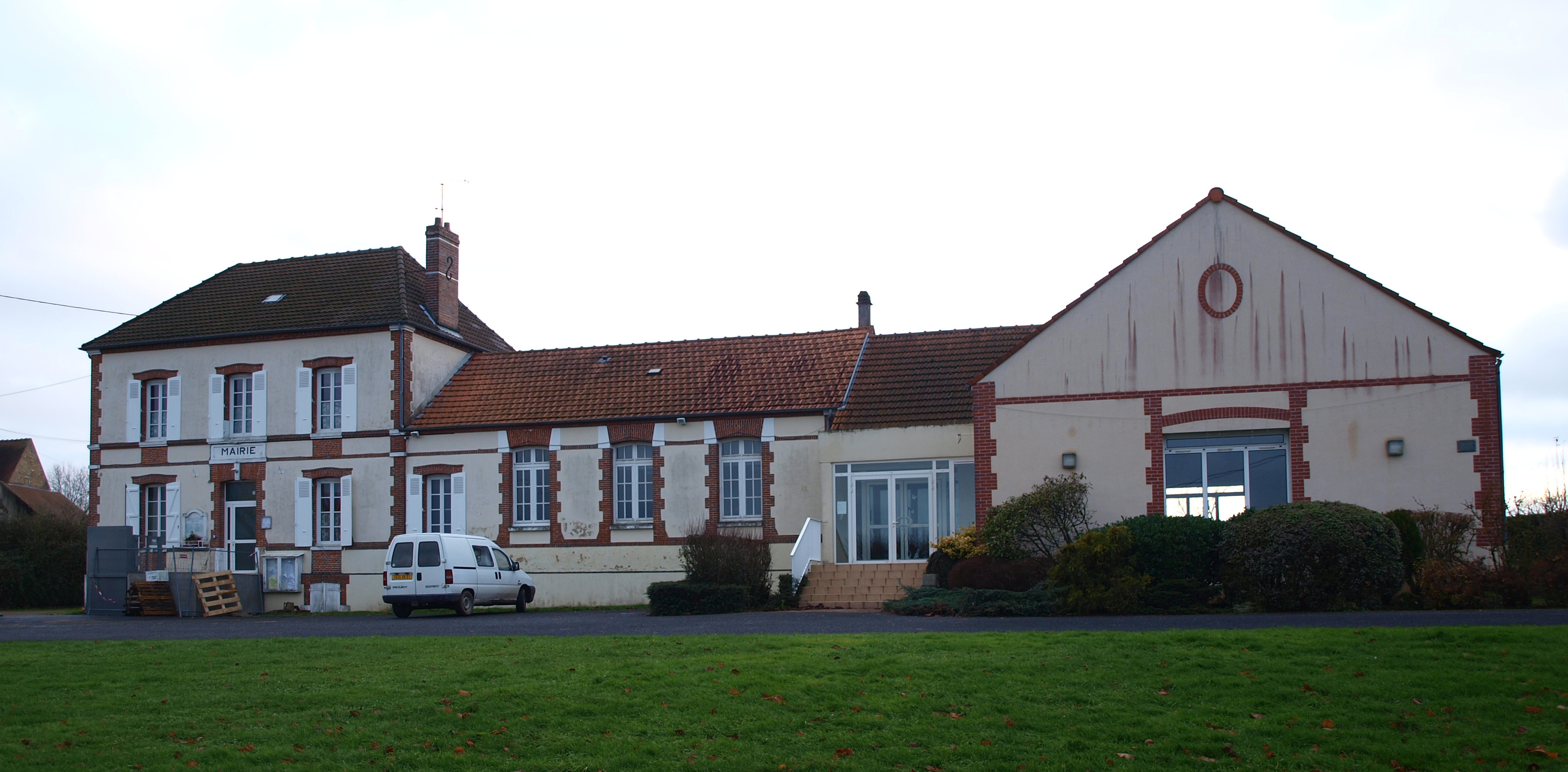
- The town hall in Morsains
- Location of Morsains
- Location within France Location within Grand Est
- Coordinates: 48°47′53″N 3°32′12″E
- Country: France
- Region: Grand Est
- Department: Marne
- Arrondissement: Épernay
- Canton: Sézanne-Brie et Champagne
- Intercommunality: CC Brie Champenoise

Government
  - Mayor (2020–2026): Philippe Lefèvre
- Area^{1}: 14.33 km^{2} (5.53 sq mi)
- Elevation: 217 m (712 ft)
- Population (2023): 150
  - Density: 10/km^{2} (27/sq mi)
- Time zone: UTC+01:00 (CET)
  - Summer (DST): UTC+02:00 (CEST)
- INSEE/Postal code: 51386 /51210
- ^{1} French Land Register data, which excludes lakes, ponds, glaciers > 1 km^{2} (0.386 sq mi or 247 acres) and river estuaries.

Morsains (French pronunciation: [mɔʁsɛ̃]) is a commune in the Marne department in north-eastern France.

== See also ==
- Communes of the Marne department
