= Piccoli =

Piccoli is an Italian surname. Notable people with the surname include:

- Adrian Piccoli (born 1970), Australian politician
- Anselmo Piccoli (1915–1992), Argentine artist
- Bernardino Piccoli (1581–1636), Roman Catholic prelate
- Carlo Piccoli (born 1970), former Italian paralympic swimmer
- Constanza Piccoli (born 1992), Chilean actress and singer
- Enrica Piccoli (born 1999), Italian synchronised swimmer
- Fantasio Piccoli (1917–1981), Italian stage director
- Flaminio Piccoli (1918–2000), Italian politician
- Gianluca Piccoli (born 1997), Italian footballer
- Ivan Piccoli (born 1981), Italian footballer
- James Piccoli (born 1991), Canadian cyclist
- Marco Piccoli (born 2001), Italian footballer
- Mariano Piccoli (born 1970), Italian cyclist
- Michel Piccoli (1925–2020), French actor
- Nestor Omar Piccoli (born 1965), Argentine footballer
- Roberto Piccoli (born 2001), Italian footballer

== See also ==
- Franco De Piccoli (1937–2026), Italian boxer
