= Naked Childhood =

- Theatrical release poster
- Directed by: Maurice Pialat
- Written by: Arlette Langmann; Maurice Pialat
- Produced by: Claude Berri; François Truffaut; Véra Belmont; Guy Benier; Mag Bodard
- Starring: Michel Terrazon; Linda Gutenberg; Raoul Billerey
- Cinematography: Claude Beausoleil
- Edited by: Arlette Langmann
- Distributed by: Parafrance
- Release date: 22 January 1969
- Running time: 83 minutes
- Country: France
- Language: French

Naked Childhood (French: L'enfance nue) is a 1968 French film. It was the feature-length debut of director Maurice Pialat, and was written by Pialat and Arlette Langmann. François Truffaut was one of the film's producers.

== Plot ==
The ten-year-old François is a child of the French foster care system after having been abandoned by his mother before the film begins. At the start of the film, François lives with a foster family - the Joingnys, who have a daughter of similar age to François. François is soon kicked out of this foster home after dropping a cat down a flight of stairs and other cruel acts such as vandalism and theft, although some of François's good character is seen upon his actions in nursing the cat he dropped and giving a gift to his foster mother upon leaving. Back in the foster care system, François is sent to live with the older Thierrys who foster an older boy by the name of Raoul and care for their sickly mother. In this environment, François acts much less troubled and the kindness that was hinted at earlier in the film begins to show through his troubled nature as he helps to care for the elderly Nana. Seemingly content in his new home, François nonetheless gives the viewer a sense that even this placement cannot last forever.

== Historical context ==
Produced in 1968, this film was not intended by the director to be a social film. Although taking place in the year 1968 with student riots overtaking the streets of Paris, Pialat's film does not delve into the politics of that matter. Giving only a short indication of the demonstrations going on in Paris, Pialat intends instead to give a glimpse into the working class French lives. Pialat, a self-proclaimed conservative, does explore the life of a foster child in detail extending beyond the context of the main character and plot. However, the treatment of social aspects in this film does not take sides but lays the foundation for the intricacies of the issues of the working class and, more thoroughly, the problems of the foster care system in 1960s France for the audience to interpret.

== Awards ==
The film won the Prix Jean Vigo in 1969.
