= Sabine Haudepin =

French actress

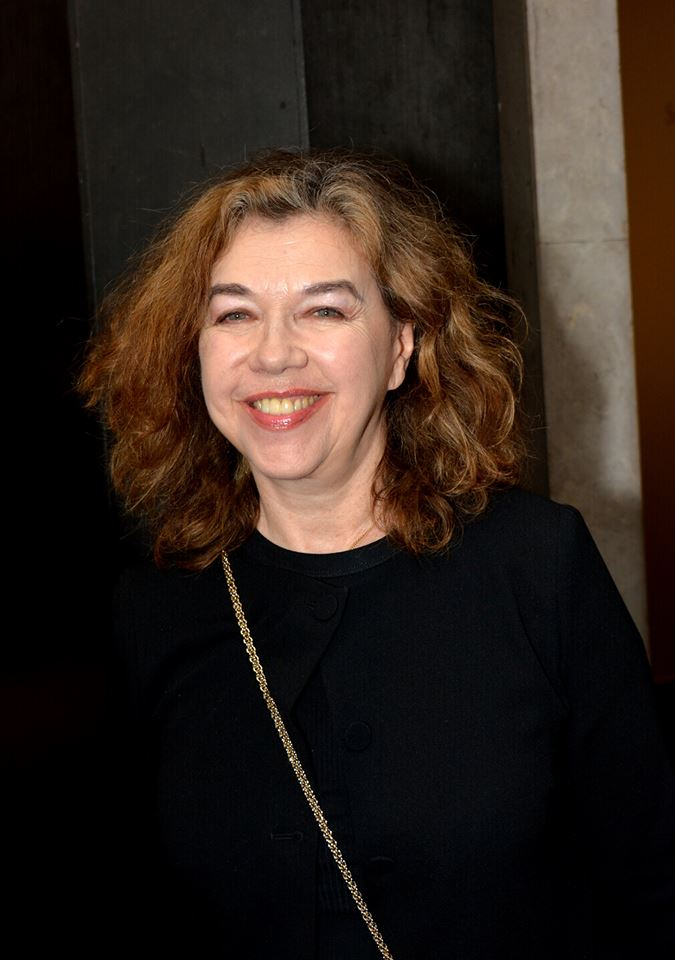
- Haudepin in 2018
- Born: 19 October 1955 (age 70); Montreuil, Seine-Saint-Denis, France
- Occupation: Actress
- Years active: 1962–present
- Relatives: Didier Haudepin (brother)

Sabine Haudepin (born 19 October 1955) is a French actress. She has appeared in more than 50 films since 1962. She was born in Montreuil, Seine-Saint-Denis, France.

== Filmography ==
Year	Title	Role	Notes
1962	Jules and Jim	Sabine, la petite	
1964	The Soft Skin	Sabine Lachenay	
1966	Trap for the Assassin	Suzanne Laroque enfant	
1970	The Bear and the Doll	Julie	
1971	Le Cinéma de papa	La petite bonne au bal	
1974	Sweet Movie		
1976	Le jeu du solitaire	Une infirmière	
1977	No Trifling with Love	Corinne	
1978	Graduate First	Élisabeth	
1980	The Last Metro	Nadine Marsac	
1981	Hotel America	Elise Tisserand	
1983	La bête noire	Karen	
1984	Our Story	Carmen	
1986	Max mon amour	Françoise, la prostituée	
1986	Corps et biens	Paule Krantz	
1987	The Man Who Wasn't There	Isabelle Strosser	
1988	La comédie du travail	Françoise Duru	
1988	Itinerary of a Spoiled Child		
1989	Les Maris, les Femmes, les Amants	Poupée Barbie	
1989	Force majeure	Jeanne	
1989	Les Sièges de l'Alcazar	Angela	
1990	La campagne de Cicéron	Françoise	
1991	La Pagaille	Patricia	
2000	Most Promising Young Actress	Hélène	
2002	Les Naufragés de la D17	Géraldine, l'astrophysicienne	
2004	Vipère au poing	Tante Thérèse	
2005	To Paint or Make Love	Suzanne	
2006	De particulier à particulier	Mme Fargeon	
2016	La papesse Jeanne	La mère supérieure	
