= L'amour existe =

1960 film

Love Exists
- Directed by: Maurice Pialat
- Written by: Maurice Pialat
- Produced by: Pierre Braunberger
- Narrated by: Jean-Loup Reynold
- Cinematography: Gilbert Sarthre
- Music by: Georges Delerue
- Release date: 1960
- Running time: 21 minutes
- Country: France
- Language: French

Love Exists (French: L'amour existe) is a short documentary essay on the Parisian suburbs made in 1960, written and directed by Maurice Pialat and produced by Pierre Braunberger.

== Awards ==
- Louis Delluc Prize 1960
- Venice Film Festival 1961
- Prix Louis Lumière 1961
