= We Won't Grow Old Together =

1972 film

- Film poster
- Directed by: Maurice Pialat
- Written by: Tito Carpi; Maurice Pialat
- Produced by: Jacques Dorfmann; Maurice Pialat; Jean-Pierre Rassam
- Starring: Marlène Jobert; Jean Yanne
- Cinematography: Luciano Tovoli
- Edited by: Bernard Dubois; Arlette Langmann
- Distributed by: Les Films Corona
- Release date: 3 May 1972
- Running time: 110 minutes
- Country: France
- Language: French

We Won't Grow Old Together (French: Nous ne vieillirons pas ensemble) is a 1972 French drama film directed by Maurice Pialat. Starring Marlène Jobert, Jean Yanne, and Macha Méril, the film is based on a novel of the same name by Pialat. It recounts the end of an affair between a married man who will not leave his wife and a spirited young woman who in the end breaks free. At the 1972 Cannes Film Festival, Jean Yanne won the award for Best Actor.

== Plot ==
Jean, a cynical, middle-aged film technician, is six years into an affair with Catherine, a much younger woman who works as a shop assistant. Though Jean is married to Françoise, his marriage has long since eroded into routine and detachment. He frequently claims he will leave his wife, but never follows through — a promise Catherine clings to with diminishing hope.

The film opens in the middle of one of their many arguments. Catherine is tired of waiting for Jean to change, while Jean oscillates between affection, condescension, and cruel outbursts. Their time together is marked by impulsive trips, quiet dinners, and regular emotional breakdowns — mostly Jean’s. The relationship operates in cycles: Catherine threatens to leave, Jean begs her to stay, and they return to a fragile peace that inevitably fractures again.

Catherine begins to grow more independent. She visits her family, where she receives warmth and support, and she begins to consider what life would be like outside Jean’s orbit. Jean, meanwhile, remains locked in his self-centered worldview — insisting he loves her, but unable to offer anything resembling stability or true commitment.

At one point, Jean does separate from his wife, seemingly making good on his long-standing promise. But Catherine no longer sees this as the solution she once believed it to be. She has begun dating a new man — kind, calm, and emotionally available — and the contrast makes Jean’s erratic behavior even more apparent.

In their final meeting, Jean tries to win her back. He assumes that now that he’s finally “free,” Catherine will come back to him. But she refuses. She’s not the same person who waited by the phone, who begged for scraps of attention. Quietly but firmly, she walks away from the relationship — and from Jean.

== Cast ==
- Marlène Jobert as Catherine
- Jean Yanne as Jean
- Macha Méril as Françoise
- Harry-Max as Jean's father
- Christine Fabréga as Catherine's mother
- Jacques Galland as Catherine's father
- Patricia Pierangeli as Annie
- Maurice Risch as Michel

== Home media ==
We Won't Grow Old Together was released on DVD and Blu-ray by Kino Lorber on 8 August 2014.

== Reception ==
On review aggregator Rotten Tomatoes, the film holds a score of 100%, based on nine reviews, with an average rating of 8.2 out of 10.

Of the film's American re-issue in 2012, New York Magazine wrote "It's deeply upsetting, featuring the kind of emotional brutality we just don't see in movies anymore."

Praising the director, The New Yorker's Richard Brody wrote "Pialat captures the push-and-pull of their impossible relationship with pugnacious images and abrupt editing."
