= Sandrine Bonnaire =

French actress (born 1967)

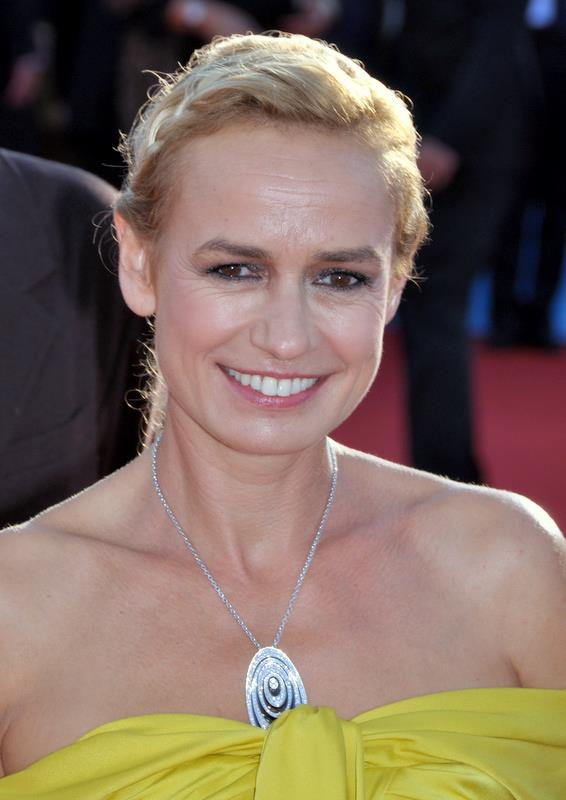
- Sandrine Bonnaire as president of the; 2012 Deauville American Film Festival
- Born: 31 May 1967 (age 58); Gannat, Allier, France
- Occupations: Actress, film director, screenwriter
- Years active: 1982–present
- Spouse: Guillaume Laurant (m. 2003; div. 2015)
- Children: 2

Sandrine Bonnaire (pronounced [sɑ̃dʁin bɔnɛːʁ]; born 31 May 1967) is a French actress, film director and screenwriter who has appeared in more than 40 films. She won the César Award for Most Promising Actress for À Nos Amours (1983), the César Award for Best Actress for Vagabond (1985) and the Volpi Cup for Best Actress for La Cérémonie (1995). Her other films include Under the Sun of Satan (1987), Monsieur Hire (1989), East/West (1999) and The Final Lesson (2015).

== Life and career ==
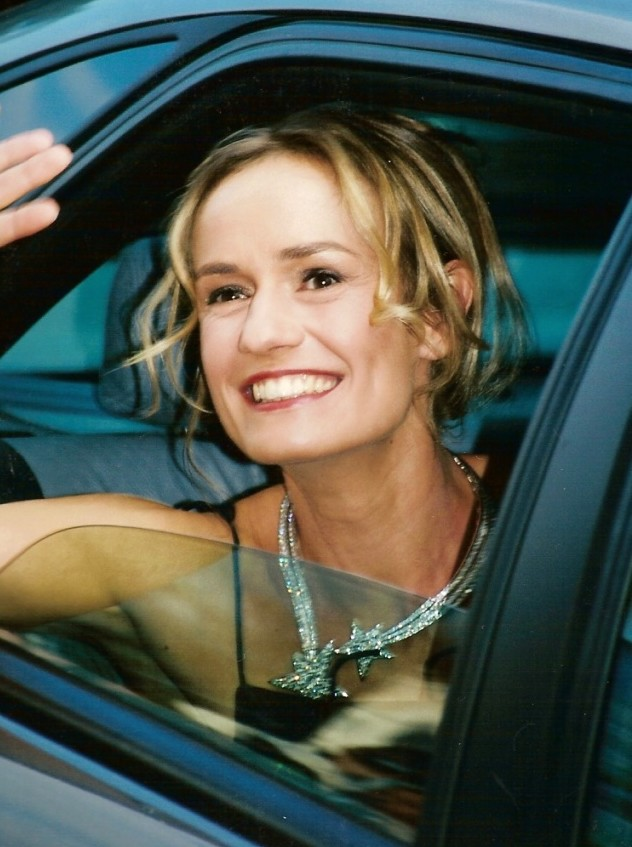
Sandrine Bonnaire at the 2000 Cannes Film Festival

Bonnaire was born in the town of Gannat, Allier, in the Auvergne region. She was born into a working-class family, the seventh of eleven children. She grew up in Grigny, Essonne. Her acting career began in 1983, when she starred in the Maurice Pialat film À Nos Amours at age 16, as a girl from Paris beginning her sexual awakening. In 1984 she received the César Award for Most Promising Actress.

Her international breakthrough came in 1985 with her portrayal of the main character, a vagrant who fails both physically and morally, in Vagabond (Sans toit ni loi), directed by Agnès Varda. The film earned Bonnaire her second César Award. Vagabond premiered at the 42nd Venice International Film Festival, where it won the Golden Lion. The jury deemed Bonnaire's performance among the best of the year, but decided against awarding her the Volpi Cup for Best Actress prize because both the actresses they judged to have given the best performances were in films that won major awards.

Bonnaire worked again with Pialat on Under the Sun of Satan (Sous le soleil de Satan) which won the Palme d'Or at the 1987 Cannes Film Festival. Monsieur Hire, directed by Patrice Leconte, followed in 1989, along with further work with directors Jacques Doillon and Claude Sautet.

In 1995, Bonnaire starred as an apparently simple maid in Claude Chabrol's widely acclaimed thriller La Cérémonie. The film and its stars won awards internationally, including the Volpi Cup for Best Actress at the 52nd Venice Film Festival for both Bonnaire and co-star Isabelle Huppert.

In 2004, Bonnaire starred in another Leconte film, Intimate Strangers, which was an arthouse box-office hit in the United States.

In 2017, Bonnaire starred in Gaël Morel's film about reverse immigration, Prendre le large. At the 8th Magritte Awards she received an Honorary Magritte Award from the Académie André Delvaux.

In 2024, Bonnaire began the filming of Slow Joe.

== Personal life ==
Bonnaire has a daughter from a relationship with actor William Hurt, whom she met in 1991 during filming of the Albert Camus novel The Plague (La Peste). They acted together in Secrets Shared with a Stranger (1994). In 2003, she married actor and screenwriter Guillaume Laurant, with whom she has a second daughter. She wrote and directed the 2012 movie J'enrage de son absence with her ex William Hurt as the main role. Bonnaire and Guillaume Laurant divorced in 2015.

== Selected filmography ==
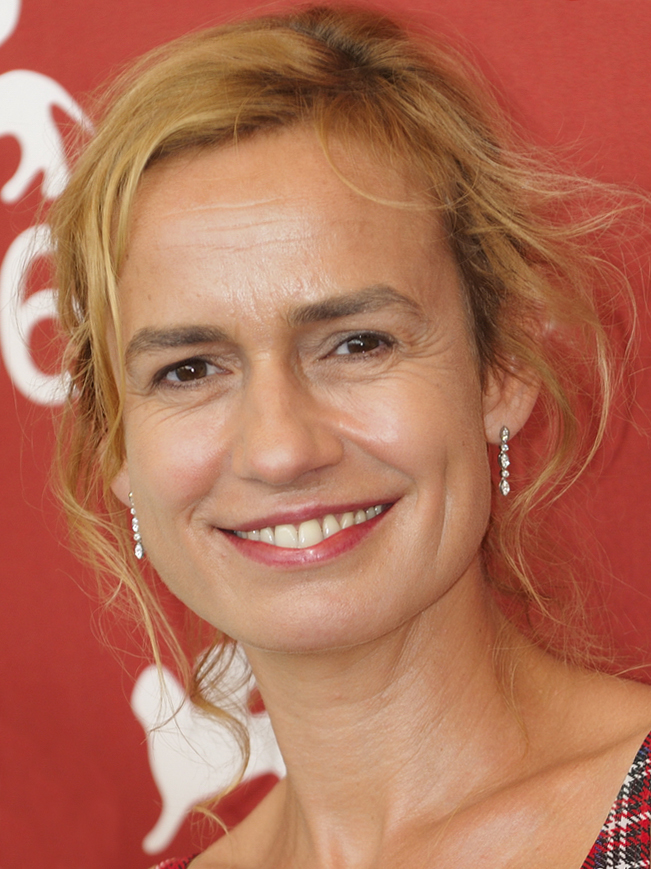
Bonnaire at the 2009 66th Venice International Film Festival as member of the jury.

=== As actress ===
| Year | Title | Role | Director | Ref. |
|---|---|---|---|---|
| 1982 | Les Sous-doués en vacances | Extra (uncredited) | Claude Zidi | |
| 1983 | À Nos Amours | Suzanne | Maurice Pialat | |
| 1984 | Fire on Sight | Marilyn | Marc Angelo | |
| 1985 | Blanche et Marie | Marie | Jacques Renard | |
| 1985 | A Better Life | Veronique | Renaud Victor | |
| 1985 | Police | Lydie | Maurice Pialat | |
| 1985 | Vagabond | Mona Bergeron | Agnès Varda | |
| 1986 | The Prude | Manon | Jacques Doillon | |
| 1987 | Under the Sun of Satan | Mouchette | Maurice Pialat | |
| 1987 | Jaune revolver | Angèle | Olivier Langlois | |
| 1987 | Les Innocents | Jeanne | André Téchiné | |
| 1988 | A Few Days With Me | Francine | Claude Sautet | |
| 1988 | Thick Skinned | Annie | Patricia Mazuy | |
| 1989 | Monsieur Hire | Alice | Patrice Leconte | |
| 1990 | Captive of the Desert | The captive | Raymond Depardon | |
| 1990 | Towards Evening | Stella | Francesca Archibugi | |
| 1991 | The Sky Above Paris | Suzanne | Michel Béna | |
| 1992 | The Plague | Martine | Luis Puenzo | |
| 1992 | Prague | Elena | Ian Sellar | |
| 1994 | Joan the Maid, Part 1: The Battles; Joan the Maid, Part 2: The Prisons | Joan of Arc | Jacques Rivette | |
| 1995 | One Hundred and One Nights | The female vagabond | Agnès Varda | |
| 1995 | La Cérémonie | Sophie | Claude Chabrol | |
| 1996 | Never Ever | Katherine | Charles Finch | |
| 1997 | Debt of Love | Monika | Andreas Gruber | |
| 1998 | Secret Defense | Sylvie | Jacques Rivette | |
| 1998 | Stolen Life | Olga | Yves Angelo | |
| 1999 | The Color of Lies | Vivianne | Claude Chabrol | |
| 1999 | East/West | Marie | Régis Wargnier | |
| 2001 | Mademoiselle | Claire | Philippe Lioret | |
| 2001 | C'est la vie | Suzanne | Jean-Pierre Améris | |
| 2002 | Femme Fatale | As herself | Brian De Palma | |
| 2003 | Resistance | Lucette | Todd Komarnicki | |
| 2004 | Intimate Strangers | Anna | Patrice Leconte | |
| 2004 | The Giraffe's Neck | Hélène | Safy Nebbou | |
| 2004 | The Light | Mabé | Philippe Lioret | |
| 2006 | Could This Be Love? | Elsa | Pierre Jolivet | |
| 2006 | Demandez la permission aux enfants | Marie | Eric Civanyan | |
| 2007 | A Simple Heart | Félicité | Marion Laine | |
| 2008 | Mark of an Angel | Claire | Safy Nebbou | |
| 2009 | Queen to Play | Hélène | Caroline Bottaro | |
| 2013 | Adieu Paris | Françoise Dupret | Franziska Buch | |
| 2014 | Salaud, on t'aime | Nathalie Béranger | Claude Lelouch | |
| 2014 | Soul of a Spy | Jacqueline | Vladimir Bortko | |
| 2014 | Rouge sang | Jacqueline | Xavier Durringer | TV film |
| 2015 | The Final Lesson | Diane | Pascale Pouzadoux | |
| 2016 | Heaven Will Wait | | | |
| 2017 | Capitaine Marleau | Jeanne Dewaere | Josée Dayan | |
| 2017 | A Season in France | | | |
| 2017 | Catch the Wind | | | |
| 2021 | Happening | Gabrielle Duchesne | Audrey Diwan | |
| 2021 | Love Is Better Than Life | Sandrine Massaro | | |
| 2022 | Umami | Louise Carvin | Slony Sow | |
| 2022 | Les Combattantes | Éléonore Dewitt | | |
| 2023 | Dance First | Suzanne Dechevaux-Dumesnil | James Marsh | |
| 2024 | Limonov: The Ballad | TBA | Kirill Serebrennikov | |
| 2024 | Finalement | | Claude Lelouch | |
| 2025 | La vie devant moi | | | |

=== As director/screenwriter ===
| Year | Title | Cast | Notes | Ref. |
|---|---|---|---|---|
| 2007 | Elle s'appelle Sabine (Her Name is Sabine) | Sabine Bonnaire | Documentary; Cannes Film Festival - Directors' Fortnight or Critics' Week; French Syndicate of Cinema Critics - Best First Film; Globe de Cristal for Best Documentary; Nominated - Cannes Film Festival - Golden Camera; Nominated - Chicago International Film Festival - Best Documentary; Nominated - César Award for Best Documentary Film | |
| 2012 | J'enrage de son absence | William Hurt, Alexandra Lamy | Feature film | |
| 2016 | Marianne Faithfull - Fleur d'âme | Marianne Faithfull, Sandrine Bonnaire | Documentary film | |

== Awards and nominations ==
| Year | Award | Category | Film | Result |
|---|---|---|---|---|
| 1984 | César Awards | Most Promising Actress | À nos amours | Won |
| 1986 | César Awards | Best Actress | Sans toit ni loi | Won |
| 1988 | César Awards | Best Actress | Sous le soleil de Satan | Nominated |
| 1990 | César Awards | Best Actress | Monsieur Hire | Nominated |
| 1995 | César Awards | Best Actress | Joan the Maiden | Nominated |
| 1996 | César Awards | Best Actress | La Cérémonie | Nominated |
| 2000 | César Awards | Best Actress | Est-Ouest | Nominated |
| 2009 | César Awards | Best Documentary Film | Elle s'appelle Sabine | Nominated |
| 1995 | Venice Film Festival | Volpi Cup for Best Actress | La Cérémonie | Won |
