= Yann Dedet =

French film editor and actor

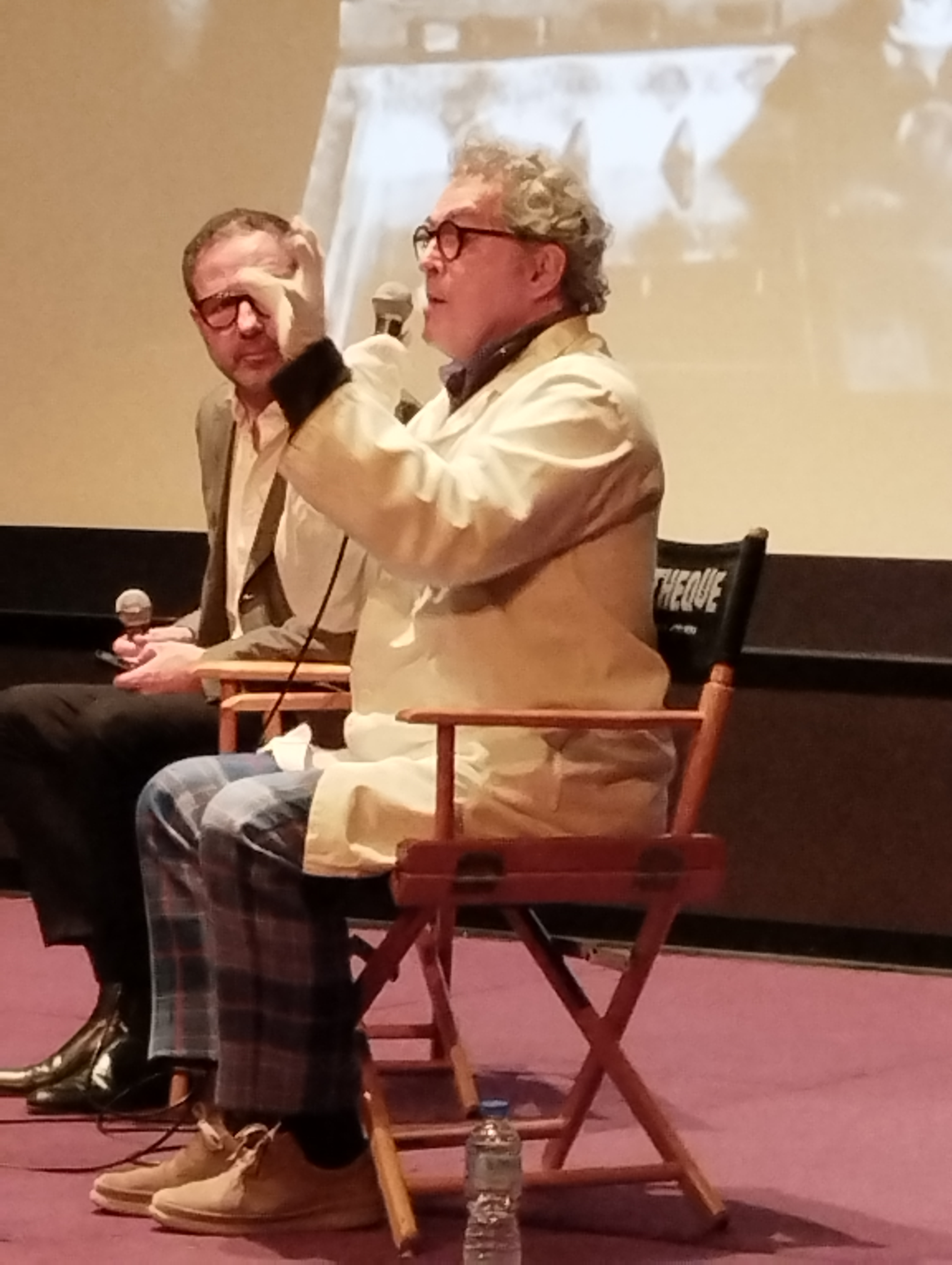
- Dedet in 2023
- Born: 25 January 1946 (age 80)
- Occupations: Film editor; Actor

Yann Dedet (born 25 January 1946) is a French film editor and actor. Dedet has been working in film editing since the early 1970s. He often worked for film directors François Truffaut, Maurice Pialat and Nicole Garcia. His work includes more than 80 film and television productions. In 2012, Dedet was awarded the César Award for Best Editing with his co-editor Laure Gardette for the 2011 film Polisse. Before that, he had been nominated twice times. As an actor, he was only seen in small roles.

== Filmography ==
=== As director ===
2002

Le Pays du chien qui chante

=== As editor ===
2019

- Happy Birthday

2018

- Keep Going

2017

- Elementary

2016

- After Love
- In The Forest

2015

- Being 14
- The Sense of Wonders

2014

- La Braconne
- Valentin Valentin

2013

- Casa Nostra
- For Those Who Can Tell No Tales
- Jealousy
- Sense of Humor

2012

- Mauvaise fille

2011

- A Burning Hot Summer
- Poliss

2010

- It Begins With the End
- No Trepassing
- Robert Mitchum est mort

2009

- Regrets

2008

- Frontier of Dawn
- The Other One

2006

- Dans les cordes
- Lady Chatterley

2005

- Free Zone

2004

- Red Lights

2000

- Come Undone

1980

- Guns

1978

- Passe montagne

== Publication ==
- Le Point de vue du lapin. Le roman de « Passe Montagne », P.O.L., 2017
