= Maurice Pialat =

French filmmaker (1925–2003)

- Born: 31 August 1925; Cunlhat, France
- Died: 11 January 2003 (aged 77); Paris, France
- Occupations: Film director, screenwriter

Maurice Pialat (French: [mɔʁis pjala]; 31 August 1925 – 11 January 2003) was a French film director, screenwriter and actor known for the rigorous and unsentimental style of his films. His work is often described as "realist", though many film critics acknowledge it does not fit the traditional definition of realism.

Pialat's films are said to have dispensed with mannerisms, and his everyday stories tell the bittersweet nature of the French petite bourgeoisie. This earned him the disregard of some critics, but also enduring popularity, with films characterized by a psychological narrative style, often set outside the metropolises.

== Life and career ==
Pialat was born in Cunlhat, Puy-de-Dôme, France. He originally intended to become a painter, but met with little success. Having acquired a camera at age 16, he tried his hand at documentary films before making his first notable short, L'amour existe, in 1960.

Pialat came to filmmaking late. He directed his feature-length debut, 1969's L'enfance nue (The Naked Childhood) at age 43. The film, which was co-produced by French New Wave director François Truffaut, won the Prix Jean Vigo.

During his 35-year career, Pialat completed ten major features, several of which—most notably Loulou—have been interpreted as autobiographical. He directed Gérard Depardieu in four films: Loulou, Police, Sous le soleil de Satan (Under the Sun of Satan), for which Pialat won the Palme d'Or at the 1987 Cannes Film Festival, and Le Garçu (1995).

In a posthumous tribute written for the French film magazine Positif, critic Noël Herpe called Pialat's style "a naturalism that was born of formalism". In English-language film criticism, he is often compared to his American contemporary John Cassavetes.

Summarizing Pialat's stance as a filmmaker in a profile for Film Comment, critic Kent Jones wrote: "To say that Pialat marched to the beat of a different drummer is to put it mildly. In fact, he didn't really march at all. He ambled, and fuck anybody who got it into their head that they'd like to amble along with him. Or behind him. Or ahead of him."

== Style ==
Pialat's films are often noted for their loose yet rigorous style and for their elliptical editing and long takes. Describing the unique aesthetics of Pialat's work, film critic Kent Jones wrote: "More than Cassavetes, more than Renoir, Pialat wanted every frame of celluloid bearing his name to be marked by the here and the now. [...] He was always willing to bend his narratives around experience. And the frequent ruptures, discontinuities, perspective shifts, and ellipses in his work are less single-minded than those of Cassavetes, more far-reaching in their implications."

== Filmography ==
=== Director ===
==== Feature films ====
- L'enfance nue (1968)
- La maison des bois (1971, TV mini-series)
- We Won't Grow Old Together (Nous ne vieillirons pas ensemble) (1972)
- The Mouth Agape (La gueule ouverte) (1974)
- Graduate First (Passe ton bac d'abord) (1978)
- Loulou (1980)
- À nos amours (1983)
- Police (1985)
- Under the Sun of Satan (Sous le soleil de Satan) (1987)
- Van Gogh (1991)
- Le Garçu (1995)

==== Short films (selected) ====
- Drôles de bobines (1957)
- L'Ombre familière (1958)
- L'amour existe (1960)
- Janine (1961)
- Maître Galip (1962)
- Jardins d'Arabie (1963)
- Byzance (1964)
- Pehlivan (1964)

=== Actor ===
- Le jeu de la nuit (1957)
- This Man Must Die (1969) - Police commissioner Constant
- My Little Loves (1974) - Henri's friend
- Les lolos de Lola (1976) - Tool vendor
- À Nos Amours (1983) - Father
- Under the Sun of Satan (1987) - Menou-Segrais (final film role)
