= Thibault de Montalembert =

French actor

- Born: Thibault Charles Marie Septime de Montalembert; 10 February 1962 (age 64); Laval, France
- Occupation: Actor
- Years active: 1987–present
- Relatives: Hugues de Montalembert (older brother)

Thibault Charles Marie Septime de Montalembert (French: [tibo də mɔ̃talɑ̃bɛʁ]; born 10 February 1962) is a French theatre, film and television actor. He is perhaps best known for his roles in the television series The Tunnel (2013–2018) and Call My Agent! (2015–2020), and the film Champagne Problems (2025).

== Career ==
He was a resident of the Comédie-Française from 1994 to 1996.

== Theatre ==
Year	Title	Author	Director	Notes
1987	Platonov	Anton Chekhov	Patrice Chéreau	Festival d'Avignon
1987	Penthesilea	Heinrich von Kleist	Pierre Romans	Théâtre Nanterre-Amandiers
1987	Catherine de Heilbronn	Heinrich von Kleist	Pierre Romans (2)	Théâtre Nanterre-Amandiers
1988	The Winter's Tale	William Shakespeare	Luc Bondy	Théâtre Nanterre-Amandiers
1988	Hamlet	William Shakespeare	Patrice Chéreau (2)	Théâtre Nanterre-Amandiers
1988	Chroniques d'une fin d'après-midi	Anton Chekhov	Pierre Romans (3)	Festival d'Avignon
1990	The Notebook	Agota Kristof	Jeanne Champagne	Théâtre Nanterre-Amandiers
1992	La Veuve	Pierre Corneille	Christian Rist	Théâtre de l'Athénée
1993	Janvier	Olivier Szulzynger	Olivier Szulzynger	Festival d'Avignon
1994	Lucrezia Borgia	Victor Hugo	Jean-Luc Boutté	Comédie-Française
1995	Intrigue and Love	Friedrich Schiller	Marcel Bluwal	Comédie-Française
1995	The Misanthrope	Molière	Simon Eine	Comédie-Française
1995	Mille francs de récompense	Victor Hugo	Jean-Paul Roussillon	Comédie-Française
1996–97	The Court-Singer	Frank Wedekind	Louis-Do de Lencquesaing	Théâtre de la Bastille
2000	La Dame aux Camélias	Alexandre Dumas	Alfredo Arias	Théâtre Marigny
2001	Hamlet	Jules Laforgue	Hervé Icovic	Théâtre du Petit Chien
2002	Valparaiso	Don DeLillo	Thierry de Peretti	Théâtre de la Bastille
2004	Les Témoins ou Notre Petit Équilibre	Tadeusz Różewicz	Lukasz Kos	Maison de la Poésie
2004	Rimbaud est un autre	Al Berto, Philippe Claudel, ...	Nadine Eghels	Maison de la Poésie
2004	Choses tendres	Marie de Beaumont	Olivier Schneider	Théâtre Ouvert
2005	Celebration	Harold Pinter	Roger Planchon	Théâtre du Rond-Point
2005	Illuminations	Arthur Rimbaud	Thierry de Peretti (2)	Théâtre de la Ville
2006	Betrayal	Harold Pinter	Philippe Lanton	Théâtre de l'Athénée
2007	Letter to His Father	Franz Kafka	Thibault de Montalembert	Théâtre de la Bastille
2007	Display	Joseph Danan	Jacques Bonnaffé	Théâtre de la Bastille
2009	Sweet Home	Arnaud Cathrine	Jean-Pierre Garnier	Théâtre de la Tempête
2012–13	Race	David Mamet	Pierre Laville	Théâtre des Champs-Élysées
2016	Politiquement correct	Salomé Lelouch	Salomé Lelouch	Théâtre de La Pépinière

== Filmography ==
Year	Title	Role	Director	Notes
1987	Hôtel de France	Nicolas	Patrice Chéreau	
1987	Cinéma 16	Thibault	Jacques Doillon	TV series (1 episode)
1988	L'argent	Maxime	Jacques Rouffio	TV movie
1989	Le conte d'hiver	Dion	Pierre Cavassilas	TV movie
1990	Ivanov	Lvov	Arnaud Sélignac	TV movie
1990	Hamlet	Horatio	Pierre Cavassilas (2)	TV movie
1990	V comme vengeance		Luc Béraud	TV series (1 episode)
1991	Lola Zipper	Stéphane	Ilan Duran Cohen	
1991	La vie des morts	Christian Mac Gillis	Arnaud Desplechin	Short
1991	Les enfants de la plage	Gérard 'Le Grondin'	Williams Crépin	TV movie
1991	Chronique d'une fin d'après-midi		Pierre Romans	TV movie
1992	Indochine	Charles-Henri	Régis Wargnier	
1992	The Sentinel	Jean-Jacques	Arnaud Desplechin (2)	
1993	The Little Apocalypse	Arnold's assistant	Costa-Gavras	
1993	Der grüne Heinrich	Henri le Vert	Thomas Koerfer	
1994	Du fond du coeur	Prosper de Barante	Jacques Doillon (2)	
1994	Il faut qu'une porte soit ouverte ou fermée		Benoît Jacquot	TV movie
1994	Jalna	Arthur Leight	Philippe Monnier	TV mini-series
1995	Jefferson in Paris	Assistant	James Ivory	
1995	Julie Lescaut	Bosetti	Marion Sarraut	TV series (1 episode)
1996	My Sex Life... or How I Got into an Argument	Bob	Arnaud Desplechin (3)	
1996	Love, etc.	Bernard	Marion Vernoux	
1996	Crime sans témoin	Luc Vaillant	Thierry Binisti	TV movie
1996	Navarro	Dessantis	Patrick Jamain	TV series (1 episode)
1997	Les infidèles	Charles	Randa Chahal Sabag	TV movie
1997	Docteur Sylvestre	Simon	Christian François	TV series (1 episode)
1998	American Cuisine	Vincent	Jean-Yves Pitoun	
1998	Noël en famille		Fabienne Berthaud & Aruna Villiers	Short
1998	La dernière des romantiques	Alain	Joyce Buñuel	TV movie
1998	Marseille	Antoine de Fabiani	Didier Albert	TV mini-series
1999	Lovers	Jean-Michel	Jean-Marc Barr	
1999	Mes amis	Marc	Michel Hazanavicius	
1999	Les infortunes de la beauté	Vincent	John Lvoff	
1999	De père en fils	Romain	Jérôme Foulon	TV movie
1999	Premier de cordée	Walter von Drexel	Édouard Niermans & Pierre-Antoine Hiroz	TV movie
1999	Voleur de coeur	Daniel	Patrick Jamain (2)	TV movie
1999	Vertiges	Commissioner Martin Aranche	Christian François (2)	TV series (1 episode)
2000	Stardom	French Intellectual	Denys Arcand	
2000	La Chambre obscure		Marie-Christine Questerbert	
2000	Vive nous !	Yves	Camille de Casabianca	
2000	Manipularea		Nicolae Opritescu	
2000	2ème sous sol	Franck	Hugues Deniset	Short
2001	The Pornographer	Richard	Bertrand Bonello	
2001	Un coeur oublié	Monsieur de Vallières	Philippe Monnier (2)	TV movie
2002	In My Skin	Daniel	Marina de Van	
2002	Jeu de jambes	Vincent	Hugues Deniset (2)	Short
2002	Un petit Parisien	Claude	Sébastien Grall	TV movie
2003	Shimkent hôtel	Doctor de Montalembert	Charles de Meaux	
2003	Rêver	The man	Juan Pittaluga	Short
2004	Sindromul Timișoara	Julien le Bries	Marius Barna	
2004	Un fils sans histoire	Jean	Daniel Vigne	TV movie
2005	3 jours en juin	Marchal	Philippe Venault	TV movie
2006	Days of Glory	Captain Martin	Rachid Bouchareb	
2006	Don't Worry, I'm Fine	The psychiatrist	Philippe Lioret	
2006	Premonition	Inspector	Jean-Pierre Darroussin	
2006	Aurore	The counselor	Nils Tavernier	
2006	Une histoire de pieds	Pierre	David & Stéphane Foenkinos	Short
2006	Aurore, une autre histoire	François	Henri Kebabdjian	Short
2007	Boulevard du Palais	Judge Paul Robesse	Philippe Venault (2)	TV series (1 episode)
2008	Inéluctable	Chauffour	François Luciani	TV movie
2008	Chez Maupassant	Henri d'Hubières	Olivier Schatzky	TV series (1 episode)
2009	Je suis venu pour elle		Ivan Taieb	
2009	Un viol	Lawyer Taïeb	Marion Sarraut (2)	TV movie
2009	Mourir d'aimer	Lucas Malzieu's father	Josée Dayan	TV movie
2010	Outside the Law	Morvan	Rachid Bouchareb (2)	
2010	Vital désir	Hugo	Jérôme Boivin	TV movie
2010	Les vivants et les morts	Gasnier	Gérard Mordillat	TV series (8 episodes)
2010–12	Commissaire Laviolette	Judge Chabrand	Bruno Gantillon	TV series (3 episodes)
2011	Léa	Martin Itzinger	Bruno Rolland	
2011	Drumont, histoire d'un antisémite français	Alphonse Daudet	Emmanuel Bourdieu	TV movie
2011	Accident de parcours	Commissioner Lambert	Patrick Volson	TV movie
2011	Saïgon, l'été de nos 20 ans	Colonel Imbert	Philippe Venault (3)	TV mini-series
2011	La loi selon Bartoli	M. Stloeffer	Charlotte Brandström & François Velle	TV series (1 episode)
2011	L'épervier	Hervé de Villeneuve	Stéphane Clavier	TV series (6 episodes)
2013	Le grand retournement	The Prime Minister	Gérard Mordillat (2)	
2013	Ordalie		Marya Yaborskaya	Short
2013–2018	The Tunnel	Olivier Pujol	Thomas Vincent, Hettie MacDonald, ...	TV series (16 episodes)
2014	Le zoo de monsieur Vanel	Monsieur Vanel	Bérenger Thouin	Short
2015	La course	The journalist	Bérenger Thouin (2)	Short
2015–2020	Call My Agent!	Mathias Barneville	Cédric Klapisch, Lola Doillon, ...	TV series (24 episodes); Nominated – ACS Award for Best Actor (2016); Nominated – Globe de Cristal Award for Best Actor - Television Film or Television Series
2016	Chocolat	Jules Moy	Roschdy Zem	
2016	The Odyssey	Etienne Deshaies	Jérôme Salle	
2016	Eternity	Valentine's father	Tran Anh Hung	
2016	For This Is My Body	The Manager	Paule Muret	
2017	Jalouse	Jean-Pierre	David Foenkinos (2) & Stéphane Foenkinos	
2017	Aurore Tabort		Blandine Lenoir	
2019	The King	Charles VI	David Michôd	
2020	Miss	Lola	Ruben Alves	
2022	All Quiet on the Western Front	Ferdinand Foch	Edward Berger	
2023	AKA	Kruger	Morgan S. Dalibert	TV movie
2023	Heartstopper	Stéphane Nelson	Euros Lyn	TV series (2 episodes)
2024	Franklin	Charles Gravier	Tim Van Patten	Upcoming miniseries
2024	The Veil	Magritte		
2025	Under a Dark Sun	Arnaud Lasserre		TV series (6 episodes)
2026	Heartstopper Forever	Stéphane Nelson	Wash Westmoreland	TV movie
2026	Dix Pour Cent (movie)	Mathias Barneville	Émilie Noblet	

== Dubbing ==
Thibault de Montalembert is the French voice of Hugh Grant and several other actors.

Year	Title	Role	Actor	Director
1969	On Her Majesty's Secret Service (Blu-Ray release)	James Bond	George Lazenby	Peter R. Hunt
1996	Trainspotting	Simon "Sick Boy" Williamson	Jonny Lee Miller	Danny Boyle
1996	Sleepers	Michael Sullivan	Brad Pitt	Barry Levinson
1997	Anna Karenina	Count Alexei Kirillovitch Vronsky	Sean Bean	Bernard Rose
1998	The Gingerbread Man	Clyde Pell	Robert Downey Jr.	Robert Altman
1999	Notting Hill	William "Will" Thacker	Hugh Grant	Roger Michell
1999	Eyes Wide Shut	Carl Thomas	Thomas Gibson	Stanley Kubrick
1999	Mickey Blue Eyes	Michael Felgate	Hugh Grant	Kelly Makin
1999	The Messenger: The Story of Joan of Arc	Duke of Burgundy	Michael Jenn	Luc Besson
2000	Vatel	Marquis of Lauzun	Tim Roth	Roland Joffé
2001	Spy Kids	Gregorio Cortez	Antonio Banderas	Robert Rodriguez
2001	Bridget Jones's Diary	Daniel Cleaver	Hugh Grant	Sharon Maguire
2001	Original Sin	Luis Vargas	Antonio Banderas	Michael Cristofer
2002	Together	Professor Jiang	Wang Zhiwen	Chen Kaige
2002	About a Boy	Will Freeman	Hugh Grant	Chris Weitz & Paul Weitz
2002	Frida	David Alfaro Siqueiros	Antonio Banderas	Julie Taymor
2002	Full Frontal	Nicholas's Agent	David Alan Basche	Steven Soderbergh
2002	Two Weeks Notice	George Wade	Hugh Grant	Marc Lawrence
2002	The Transporter	Darren "Wall Street" Bettencourt	Matt Schulze	Louis Leterrier & Corey Yuen
2003	The Human Stain	Nathan Zuckerman	Gary Sinise	Robert Benton
2003	Spy Kids 3-D: Game Over	Gregorio Cortez	Antonio Banderas	Robert Rodriguez
2003	Love Actually	David	Hugh Grant	Richard Curtis
2003	In the Cut	Detective Giovanni A. Malloy	Mark Ruffalo	Jane Campion
2004	Stage Beauty	King Charles II	Rupert Everett	Richard Eyre
2004	Bridget Jones: The Edge of Reason	Daniel Cleaver	Hugh Grant	Beeban Kidron
2004	The Aviator	Ludlow Ogden Smith	J. C. MacKenzie	Martin Scorsese
2005	Unleashed	Wyeth	Michael Jenn	Louis Leterrier
2005	Travaux	The neighbor	Hugh Grant	Brigitte Roüan
2006	The Fountain	Tomas / Tommy / Tom Creo	Hugh Jackman	Darren Aronofsky
2006	The Secret Life of Words	Josef	Tim Robbins	Isabel Coixet
2006	Atomised	Bruno	Moritz Bleibtreu	Oskar Roehler
2006	American Dreamz	Martin "Tweedy" Tweed	Hugh Grant	Paul Weitz
2007	Funny Games	George Snr.	Tim Roth	Michael Haneke
2007	I'm Not There	Robbie Clark	Heath Ledger	Todd Haynes
2007	Music and Lyrics	Alex Fletcher	Hugh Grant	Marc Lawrence
2008	Changeling	Rev. Gustav Briegleb	John Malkovich	Clint Eastwood
2009	Public Enemies	J. Edgar Hoover	Billy Crudup	Michael Mann
2009	In the Electric Mist	Elrod Sykes	Peter Sarsgaard	Bertrand Tavernier
2009	Did You Hear About the Morgans?	Paul Morgan	Hugh Grant	Marc Lawrence
2010	The Ghost Writer	Adam Lang	Pierce Brosnan	Roman Polanski
2010	Tamara Drewe	Andy Cobb	Luke Evans	Stephen Frears
2010	The Tree	George Elrick	Marton Csokas	Julie Bertuccelli
2011	The King's Speech	Edward VIII	Guy Pearce	Tom Hooper
2011	Hop	Henry O'Hare	Gary Cole	Tim Hill
2011	Hysteria	Lord Edmund St. John-Smythe	Rupert Everett	Tanya Wexler
2012	A Separation	Nader	Peyman Moaadi	Asghar Farhadi
2012	Cloud Atlas	Several	Hugh Grant	The Wachowskis & Tom Tykwer
2012	Two Lives	Bjarte Myrdal	Sven Nordin	Georg Maas & Judith Kaufmann
2012	Snow White and the Huntsman	Finn	Sam Spruell	Rupert Sanders
2012	Beyond the Hills	The Priest	Valeriu Andriuta	Cristian Mungiu
2013	Love Is All You Need	Phillip	Pierce Brosnan	Susanne Bier
2013	Blood Ties	Lt. Connellan	Noah Emmerich	Guillaume Canet
2013	Hyde Park on Hudson	King George VI	Samuel West	Roger Michell
2013	The Grandmaster	Ip Man	Tony Leung Chiu-wai	Wong Kar-wai
2014	The Rewrite	Keith Michaels	Hugh Grant	Marc Lawrence
2014	The November Man	Peter Devereaux	Pierce Brosnan	Roger Donaldson
2015	The Man from U.N.C.L.E.	Alexander Waverly	Hugh Grant	Guy Ritchie
2016	Florence Foster Jenkins	St. Clair Bayfield	Hugh Grant	Stephen Frears
