= Crillon =

Crillon may refer to:

== People ==
- Louis des Balbes de Berton de Crillon

== Places ==
- Hôtel de Crillon, a hotel in Paris

Crillon is the name or part of the name of several communes in France:

- Crillon, Oise, in the Oise département
- Crillon-le-Brave, in the Vaucluse département
- Cape Crillon, the southernmost point of Sakhalin, in Russia.
- Crillon Tours, DMC and largest Tour Operator in Bolivia
