= House of Balbo Bertone =

Arms of the House of Balbo Bertone

The House of Balbo Bertone is a Piedmontese family that held a preeminent position in the politics of medieval and early Renaissance Chieri, a Piedmontese city republic within the Holy Roman Empire, which starting from the late eleventh century struggled for independence from its Imperial liege overlords: at various times the Bishops of Turin, the Counts of Biandrate, and the Marquis of Montferrat. As the city grew in power and prosperity, it became with its sister Republic of Asti an important centre of commerce on the trade route from Genova and Italy to France, up until the 15th century. It was then incorporated completely into the County of Savoy and lost its independence.

From that time on, some Balbo Bertone members participated in the political and military life of Piedmont as part of the County of Savoy, which would evolve into a Duchy, a small Kingdom and eventually the Kingdom of Italy.

== Theories of origin ==
It is speculated by the authors of the known histories of Chieri and of the family that the Balbo family, whose earliest documented member is known to have lived in the 11th century, were of Roman origin. There is no direct proof linking the medieval family to Roman times, however there are several known Romans who carried the same name and it can broadly be said that a gens Balbi existed, started with Lucius Cornelius Balbus in 72 B.C.

A close friend and advisor of Julius Caesar and of the first Emperor, Augustus, Balbus was a military officer, politician and financier born in Gabes, of Carthaginian origins and Phoenician name. He served as Consul with Crassus in 40 B.C. He was naturalized as a Roman citizen by Pompey in 72 B.C. by Pompey using the Lex Gellia Cornelia for his services to the Roman Republic. He was accused of forging his i and was notoriously defended by Cicero in his Pro Balbo oration of 57 B.C.

Marguerite de Lussan, author of a biography of Ludovico Balbo Bertone di Crillon published in 1781, suggests in an appendix to the book title Historie de la Maison de Balbe de Quiers that at the fall of the Roman Empire many Roman families found refuge in the smaller cities of Cisalpine Gaul and other parts of Italy, and the a descendant of the gens Balbi, accordingly settled in Chieri at the end of the sixth century and gave the city its republican form of government.

Luigi Cibrario, author of the "Histories of Chieri", also suggests that they were of Roman origin, rather than of Gothic, Longobardic or Frankish origin, as was the case for many of the prominent Italian families of the Middle Ages. This, he argues, is suggested by their family name but corroborated by the fact that their power did not stem from the number of castles and armies commanded around the lands of Chieri, but by their centuries long civic service to its republic.

Although there is no actual evidence that a member of the gens Balbi relocated to Chieri, if this were the case, the oligarchic positions that we know the Balbi held in the Middle Ages might be the result of hereditary transmission of offices of local government which would have been of bureaucratic and elective nature during the Roman Empire. This would make them and the city of Chieri as well, an example of how Roman customs, administrations and law continued to be relevant and exercised at a local level from the end of the Roman Empire into the medieval period, a phenomenon that we know was most common in Roman Gaul and Hispania, and which is likely to have been the case for areas of Cisalpine Gaul as well, where Chieri is located.

Indeed, the city of Chieri, but also the neighbor cities of Asti and Testona and likely many others in northern Italy were governed in the Middle Ages as republics with at the head consuls, elected among its most prominent citizens. Like other urban areas of the time in the Italian peninsula which ruled as small city states, Chieri's self rule was possible because of the extremely loose and decentralized feudal administration of the Holy Roman Empire of northern Italy, increasingly prosperous and geographically isolated from the throne.

== Medieval history ==
The two families formally split from the original House of the Balbus, with a treaty signed in 1220 by members of the family agreeing that the name would be passed by primogeniture, while the others would be distinguished by denominations of Bertoni, Porri, Simeoni and Signorini, first names that were to become family names for the different branches. This process, common at the time in this region, was to be very important in the development of the history of Chieri as it laid the basis for the formation of their Albergo, a sort of syndication of powerful families into formal factions, vying for control of power. Of the various branches, of which thirty are said to exist in 1271, that of Balbo was considered the first, the Bertone branch was second, and the Simeone branch was third.

Members of the family are known to have occupied consulship and other elective political positions in the life of the republic of Chieri. The command of the armed forces of the Republic of Chieri was shared among four ministers, one of which was traditionally a member of the Balbo family and the holder of the official seal of war.

In 1155 the Emperor Barbarossa, following the Diet of Roncaglia, laid waste to the city of Chieri to re-establish the claims of the marquis of Montferrat over the independent city. The city's fortifications were ruined, including the towers of the Balbi.

At the battle of Legnano, the Balbi fought on the Guelph side and distinguished themselves. They were received in Chieri as liberators.

In 1179, in submission to the wishes of the Bishop of Turin, a truce was signed between Chieri and Testona, a neighbouring city which stood on the Po river, near Turin. Testona was situated on the main road which connected Asti and Genova to Turin, and to the French lands beyond. Located by a bridge crossing the vast river, it effectively controlled a major merchant route of the day. The truce was signed on the 24 July 1174 by Ardizzone di Revigliasco, podesta' of Chieri, and Vercello Gandolfo, podesta' of Testona. In the document are mentioned - as defenders of the public interest and first among the citizens of the council in light of their civic service over the centuries - Berardo Balbo, Guido Bertone and Simeone Balbo, who promised to keep intact the arrangement between the two cities and to protect Chieri from the Marquess of Monteferrat and other enemies.

The 1179 act is cited by Marguerite de Lussan as one of the main evidences of their presence in Chieri in the past centuries and of the hereditary nature of their positions at the head of the city council. She quotes the latin script "...sicuti per faecula praeterita uti conflueverant illi de Balbis" in regards to those rights, and argues that this locates them at the head of the Cherese Republic since at least the ninth century. This is close to the sixth century when it is said Balbus gave Chieri its republican form of government.

In 1184, the republic of Chieri sent Ulrico Tana, Pier di Gribaldo, Uberto di Donna Bencia, Bongiovanni Balbo and Ado Balbo to negotiate with Milone di Cardano, Bishop of Turin. The bishop was particularly offended by the growing disregard of the city towards his authority, the continued expansions of the city's fortifications and of its land acquisitions. The bishop admonished them to leave the lands near Santena, which were by right assigned to the Order of Saint Salvatore; to not elect their own podesta' (mayor); not to build any further fortifications in the city; and to provide military service twice a year for ten days in a ten miles radius around Turin.

In 1191, with the Bishop replaced by Arduino of Valperga, the city grew bolder and some of its citizen (of the Benso and Mercadilli families) purchased the castle and lands of Santena, while the city's consuls, Guglielmo and Signorino, paid the imperial tax (fodro) directly to the Imperial legate Tommaso di Nono, a powerful symbol of its growing independence from its ecclesiastical liege lord.

Heavily involved in the government of the city, as the other oligarchic families such as the Bensi, Gribaldi, Albuzzani, Mercadilli and Pillolj, the Balbi were at the head of an Albergo, an organization typical in Piedmont and Liguria which would have prominent families band together and maintain a common building and arms. They would pledge to defend and advance their political and business interests as well as avenge offences received.

In 1220, the Balbi, and the related families of the Bertoni, Porri, Simeoni and Signorini (descending from members of the Balbi with these first names), all belonging to the same Albergo, decided to build a house for their common defense with a fortified tower and formed what would become known as the Societa' de Militi. Their opposing party was the Societa' di San Giorgio, founded in 1228, which could be openly joined by members of different social levels, and which was formed to oppose the advance of aristocratic government in Chieri and, in particular, to avenge the actions of the Balbi, as frequently mentioned in their statuti. A decree of the Comune of Chieri from 1280 prohibited any members of the Balbo family from joining the society of San Giorgio.

Another Albergo which was hostile to the Balbi was that of the Gribaldi, to which the notable Broglio family belonged, from which the French House of Broglie descends.

Between 1270 and 1274, violent private disputes between the Balbi and the Englesii took place. In the official document of the truce between the two factions, dated 31 May 1271, and drawn up in Latin by the notary Arrigo Scutino, 79 members of the Albergo de Balbi are mentioned: 17 of the actual Balbo family, as well as 7 Simeoni and 12 Bertoni (whose Latin name is reported as Bretonus, possibly indicating a northern origin for this family).

In 1191, the successor Bishop Arduino di Valperga allowed the consuls of the republic of Chieri, Gugliemo Balbo and Signorino Balbo, to pay the imperial taxes (fodro) directly to the Emperor's emissary Tommasi di Nono, tacitly confirming the independence of the city from both the Bishop and the Counts of Biandrate.

In part as a measure to put an end to such struggles in the Republic, on 26 March 1311 Henry VII, Holy Roman Emperor issued a decree to reform the Statuti of Chieri, the documents comprising the rights and laws of the city, which were redacted in 332 chapters. Among the authors of the newly compiled Statuti, Raimondo Balbo is mentioned, along with Ugolino di Vichio da Firenze (the vicar left in Chieri by the Emperor), Milone di Pasquerio, Filippo di Sibone, Corrado di Pullolio, Bertolotto Gribaudo, and Facino Merlone.

Despite such reforms, conflict between the two factions continued. In the statuti of the societa' di San Giorgio is mentioned the revenge for an attack of 1326 on Tommasino Tana from Pagano Balbo, the wounding of one Frexiis, by Melano Simeoni de Balbi in 1335, the wounding of a Bezomi in 1336 by Uberto de Balbi, and of Pietro Vandono in 1339 by the Lanfranchi and the Signorini de Balbi of Paverolo, and in 1340 of the death Nicolino di Tondonico.

In 1338 the Guelph faction of the city, headed by the societa di San Giorgio, managed to expel from Chieri the heads of the noble families of the scocieta' de Militi, including Antonio Bertone de Balbi, Pietrino Balbo, many of de Vignoli and of the Merlenghi who took refuge in their homes and castles in the territory surrounding Chieri, but not without plundering and raiding those lands. The following year a ferocious battle took place near the fortress of Pietrino Balbo. The Guelph army of the city of Chieri fought valiantly, despite lower numbers, but no decisive victory against the Ghibellines was reached. However, three days after, for fear of a popular revolt and the strengthening of the Ghibelline exiles and allies, the city, by unanimous decision of its council, pledged itself to Robert I of Anjou, King of Naples, who was in Piedmont fighting the Ghibellines at the time.

On 22 April 1345, at the Battle of Gamenario, a fortress near Santena, the Angevin forces sent by Joanna I were defeated by the Ghibelline faction led by John II of Montferrat, the Marquess of Montferrat. His forces included men from Asti, Pavia, Milano, and the exiled nobles of Chieri: the lords of Veregnano, of Moncucco, Pietrino Balbo and Antonio Bertone de Balbi.

The Guelph defeat ended the Angevin presence in Piedmont, and as a consequence the Republic of Chieri pledged itself to the House of Savoy for protection against the lords of Milan, the Marquess of Montferrat and their allies.

On 19 May 1347 the official act of submission was redacted by the council of one hundred, whose notables included Arrighetto Simeoni, Millo Simeoni, Matteo Rotondo, Emanuele Porro and Andrea Bertone. All of them were of the Albergo of the Balbi. They pledged fealty to the Prince of Savoy-Achaea and the emissaries of Count Amedeo VI, Count of Savoy, Amadeus III of Geneva, Count of Geneva, and Louis of Savoy-Achaea|, Baron of Vaud. According to Luigi Cibrario, with the 1347 pledge of fealty to the House of Savoy the House of Balbo was forced to renounce many of the prerogatives which they had enjoyed up until then.

By the 1370s, the Albergo de Balbi had regained importance and power and a new feud arose when two of the Gribaldi, Lords of Alegnano, wounded Giorgino Balbo. To avenge this event Franceschino and Villichino de Bertoni, with their men, took possession of the castle of Santenotto and murdered Isnardo Gribalfi, its lord. The dispute was settled in 1377 in the presence of 17 of the Albergo of the Balbi and 25 of the Grimaldi.

Seventeen years later, Amedeo Philip I of Savoy, Prince of Achea, was called into Chieri to settle another dispute between the Balbi and the city of Chieri. Since antiquity the Balbi had held one of the four official seals of the city, the seal of the four ministers of war, of which the leading one had always been chosen from amongst them, the seal passing within their family. The prince, in the palace of the knight Filippo Simeone de Balbi, established that the Balbi recognised the City's ownership of it, yet that their ancient prerogative to its use was confirmed.

In 1389, the city, orphan of a foreign vicar, was governed by four podesta' elected for fifteen days, one of which was always of the Balbi.

In 1455, a law promulgated by Louis, duke of Savoy, targeted at reducing the prerogatives of the Balbi, removed the precedence of seniority of the oldest Alberghi of the city. This effectively revoked the hereditary nature of their positions in government. It is due to this, that Gilles Balbo Bertone relocated to Avignon and eventually started the Crillon branch of the family. On 15 October 1552, in the Palace of Chieri, a complaint was presented in the name of all of the Balbi, including those in Avignon, because Francesco Bertone was only named second of the four Podesta' (mayors) of the city.

In 1497 Giaffredo Lanfranco Balbo, doctor in law and vicar of the archbishop of Turin, published a compendium of legal decisions of judges. In the early 16th century, Gianfrancesco Balbo was nominated professor of civil law at University of Turin and later Senator in Turin. In 1542, he published the Tractatus foecundus et perutilitis, quod de praescritionibus inscribitur editus per praeclarum.

== Merchants ==
The city of Chieri became prosperous in the 13th century through many commercial ventures, like those of neighbouring city of Asti, establishing trading offices for its merchants in many provinces of France. Members of the house of Balbo Bertone are known to have been merchants.

In 1297 Giordano Balbo is known to have been in Vienne, Dauphin. In 1350 Berengo Balbo operated in the city of Montelimar, Valenza. In 1369 Aymone di Cossonay, bishop of Losanna, received for ten years in his city Bartolomeo Bertone de Balbi, Lombard, and other merchants of Chieri. In the 15th century Iacopo Ystorio de Balbi was in Geneva, signing a contract as citizen of Verdun.

== Religious contributions ==
=== Church of Santa Maria della Scala ===
The main church of the city of chieri, it is said to be built on the site of the Roman temple of Minerva. Throughout the centuries members of the house of Balbo Bertone, along with other prominent families of the city, provided donations for the church of Santa Maria della Scala, rebuilt in 1405 and commonly referred to as the Duomo of Chieri. Giorgio Bertone, in 1478, had the sacristy built at his expense. Giovanni Battista Bertone built and decorate the chapel of the Crocefisso in 1675. In 1437 Benvenuto Bertone provided an amount for the construction of the chapel of Saint John. In 1622 Silvio Balbo Bertone commissioned Giovanni da Trino an ancona, while in 1832 Carlo Gabriele provided for its renovation and a new series of paintings from Pietro Zalli, a painter from Chieri.

The military accomplishments of Ludovico Balbo Bertone, a member of the family who fought at the service of the French kings Henry III and Henry IV as well as under John of Austria at the Battle of Lepanto, are commemorated in an inscription.

=== Convent of the order of San Domenico ===
A Convent of the San Domenico order was founded in the 14th century by the Balbi, who reserved the right of nominating the convent's Abbot.

== Branches ==
- Balbo Bertone di Sambuy
- Balbo Bertone di Breme
- Bertone de Balbes de Crillon
- Balbo Bertone di Mombello

=== Related branches ===
- Balbo di Vinadio
- Balbo di Vernone

== Modern history ==
In 1752 the Monbello branch of the house became extinct and a trial in the Senate of Turin was carried out to establish the successor, disputed between the houses of Sambuy, and Crillon, and the marquis of Faverges.

== Notable members ==
The following is a selected list of notable members of the Balbo family, divided according to, broadly, the period of history in which they existed.

=== Middle Ages ===
==== Umberto Bertone dei Balbi ====
A crusader, Umberto Bertone was killed at the siege of Antioch in 1099.

==== Melan Bertone dei Balbi ====
A crusader, and son of Umberto, Melan (or Miolan), Bertone, was killed at the siege of Antioch in 1099.

==== Alexandre Simeone de Balbi ====
Alexandre Simeone, Knight of the Order of the Hospital of Saint John of Jerusalem, was instrumental in shaping the support of the Knights for Pope Alexander III in 1161, against the antipope.

==== Guido Bertone dei Balbi ====
Guido Bertone's name is attached to the treaty of 1179 with the city of Testona. He guarantees to join the forces of Chieri with that of Testona against the marquis of Montferrat in light of the precedence (or seniority) that his family has enjoyed for many centuries in Chieri. He is thought to be the son of Miola Bertone dei Balbi, and grandson of Uberto. His wife was Esmaregle del Carretto, from the family of the marquis of Savona

==== Salio Bertone ====
Salio Bertone is mentioned as Podesta' (mayor) of Vercelli in 1207.

==== Reinaldo Bertone dei Balbi ====
Reinaldo Bertone, the son of Guido and Esmaregle and mentioned in an act of April 10, 1244 declaring in front of notary Pierre Torel his intention to share the use of his inherited fortresses with other members of the house of Balbo. He was the arbiter of peace between the Republic of Chieri and Montecuque e Cayatte. He married Maria Colonna

==== Raymond Bertone dei Balbi ====
Son of Reinaldo and Maria Colonna, Raymond (or Bayamond), Bertone is mentioned in acts of 1263, 1275, and in that of March 29, 1264 in which he donates part of his inheritance. He was the brother of Ranieri, Andrea, Fazio and Filippo, all mentioned in the 1271 truce of the Balbi. He married Alexis Biandrate of the counts of San Giorgio, as mentioned in an act of 1275.

==== Melan Bertone dei Balbi ====
Confirmed as a son of Raymond by the acts of 1289 and 1290, Melan Bertone, had a brother named Corrado and married Sibille Rivalta of the Piedmontese house of Orsini.

==== Andrea Bertone dei Balbi ====
Andrea Bertone was the son of Melan and brother of Giovanni (a knight of the Order of St John of Jerusalem) and Bartolomeo. He married Anna Bonina Benso, of the house of Benso.

==== Bartolomeo Bertone dei Balbi ====
Son of Melan, Bartolomeo Bertone would found the branch of Monbello. His grandson Bartolomeo would leave his inheritance to his son George who married the daughter of the marquis of Saluzzo. Leaving no heirs behind his inheritance would basse to Bertone count of Monbello as possessing the male seniority of the house.

=== Early Modern and Modern Periods ===
==== Luigi Bertone dei Balbi ====
Luigi Bertone was recognised as the son of Andrea, by the acts of January 27 and April 28, 1361. He was made citizen of the Republic of Venice on March 24, 1409, while Michele Zeno was Doge. He married a daughter of Bernabò Visconti (sometimes shown in the variant form Barnabà), joint lord of Milan with his brother, Galeazzo II Visconti.

His sons were Bartolomeo, Andrea (married Brunetta dei conti di Solari), and Jonard (married Tomene di Valperga dei conti di San Martino).

==== Aimonetto Bertone dei Balbi ====
A son of Bartolemeo, Aimonetto Bertone married Maerie de Gribaudengis of the House of Broglie and started the branch of Balbo Bertone, counts of Sambuy.

==== Fra Paolo Simeone de Balbi ====
Knight of Rhodes, born in 1486, Paolo Simeone de Balbi was stationed on the Greek island of Leros which he defended from the raid of the privateer Kemal Reis. His forces numbering far fewer than the attackers, and the foes' artillery having opened a breach in the fortifications, Simeone arranged that the raiders would hear that Simeone was expecting reinforcements. Then he gathered all children, women and elderly, and whomever he could find, dressed them in red garments, and painted white crosses on them. He then positioned them all along the walls. He let it be known that his reinforcements had arrived. At the sight of such an overwhelming number of "troops", far more than expected, the forces of Kemal Reis withdrew.

Thirty-three years later, Simeone de Balbi was imprisoned with 6,000 Christians in the castle of Tunis of Hayreddin Barbarossa, Sultan of Algiers. As the army of the Emperor Charles V was approaching, the sultan had ordered all the prisoners killed. Thanks to many promised inducements to his jailers, Fra Simone obtained hammers and files and proceeded to free himself and his men. They escaped from confinement during the night, taking possession of the castle, which he then handed to the Emperor. In 1543 he defended the castle of Nice against the same king and his French allies, forcing the king to leave the siege with his army on two hundred vessels.

==== Gioffredo Balbo ====
Gioffredo Balbo was professor of law, and author of the Tractatus plurimarum decisionum per modum conclusionum qui semita recta causidicorum et iudicum appellatur, published in Turin 1497, and in Milan in 1538 as Iaffredi Lanfranci Balbi magni iurisconsulti insignisque Cherianorum practici observationes nonnularum in iure decisionum.

==== Gianfrancesco Balbo ====
Gianfrancesco Balbo was a professor of law and disciple of Claude de Seyssel. He was Senator in Turin and author of the Tractatus foecundus et perutilis quod de praescriptionibus inscribitur editus per praeclarum I V D Io Franciscum Balbum de Avilliana civem Taurin etc published in Lugduni 1542 Koln in 1561 Venice 1564

==== Nicolo Balbo ====
Nicolo Balbo was professor of law at the university of Turin, a statesman and advisor to Charles III, Duke of Savoy, and eventually to his son Emmanuel Philibert, Duke of Savoy. He was sent in 1535 as an ambassador to Emperor Charles V to argue the rights of succession to the March of Montferrat, his argument is preserved in a Parere, dedicated to the Duke. Serving the Duchy of Savoy he held the offices of Collaterale del Consiglio residente a Torino, riformatore dello Studio, president of the Senate. From him descends the branch of the counts of Vernone, now extinct.

==== Fabrizio Bertone ====
Fabrizio Bertone died in 1517, a Knight of the order of Malta and ambassador of the House of Savoy to the French court.

==== Maurizio Bertone ====
Provost of the congregazione Somasca, preacher and ducal storiographer, Maurizio Bertone was elected Bishop of Fossano in 1678. He built the bishop's palace and the sagresty of the cathedral.

==== Giulio Cesare Balbo Bertone ====
Giulio Cesare Balbo Bertone was an infantry general, mayor of Valenza, Susa, Canale.

==== Prospero Balbo (1762-1837) ====
Lord of Revigliasco and Bonavalle, Mayor of Turin, President of the Academy of Sciences of Turin, Interior Minister of the Kingdom of Sardinia, Prospero Balbo was nominated by Vittorio Amedeo III as ambassador to the First Republic of France. He was offered numerous position in the short lived Cisalpine Republic and the Kingdom of Etruria which he rejected, as well as rejecting the offers of Napoleon's generals to marry his daughter Paolina. In 1805 he was nominated dean of the University of Turin, and subsequently advisor to the University of France and Inspector General. At the restoration of the Kingdom of Sardinia he joined the supreme regency council and in 1816 was nominated by the King ambassador to Spain. in 1817 he was nominated viceroy of Sardinia, head of the judiciary reform and in 1819 Minister or Interior. From 1831 to 1836 he was president of the section of finances in the State Council.

==== Carlo Emanuele Balbo Bertone ====
Carlo Emanuele Balbo Bertone became the 1st Count of Sambuy in 1772.

==== Ernesto Balbo Bertone, Count of Sambuy ====
A politician of the Kingdom of Italy, Ernesto Balbo Bertone was mayor of Turin and elected to the Senate of the Kingdom of Italy where he rose to the office of vice-president of the Senate.
