= Cédric Ségeon =

Personal information
- Born: Normandy, France

Horse racing career
- Sport: Horse racing
- Career wins: 1000+ (ongoing)

Cédric Ségeon is a French professional jockey, popularly known as "Frenchie". With about 700 wins around the world including the Macau Derby with Analyst, he is widely regarded as a globetrotter.

== Early life ==
Ségeon was born in Normandy a countryside in France. His love for animals and horses got him into in horse riding. He began to ride when he was eight years old.

== Career ==
Ségeon became an apprentice jockey with Corine Barande-Barbe. after his training at AFASEC (Association de Formation et d' Action Sociale des Écuries de Courses). At AFASEC he shared the same room with the crack jockey Christophe Soumillon. Ségeon won his first race in the year 2000 with Val Ramier for trainer Nicolas Clément. Ségeon won the Champion Apprentice title in 2001. "Segeon has amassed over 70 winners including 5 big handicaps and places in Listed Races out of over 1,000 rides."

He has had a successful career in Asia where he competed with the best jockeys in the world. He excelled especially in Macau where he won the Derby. Cédric Ségéon is considered to be a globetrotter because apart from the Hexagon, he has ridden in Belgium, Tunisia, Macau, Singapore, Malaysia, South Africa, Qatar, India and in Mauritius which he considers home.

Ségeon appeared in the 2011 French film named Stretch directed by Charles de Meaux. The film was about a jockey who failed a drug test. Ségeon played the part of Cédric, one of the jockeys in the film.

He has been crowned champion jockey and ride of the day award winner 2014 in Mauritius.

== Major wins ==
Mauritius

- The Duchesse Of York Cup - (3) - Royal Chalon (2011), Silver Bluff (2015), Baritone (2018)
- The Princess Margaret Cup G1 - (2) - Liquid Motion (2013), Baritone (2018)
- The Maiden Cup G1 - (1) - Alshibaa (2020)
- The Lightning Cup G3 - (1) - Ernie (2017)

Macau

- Macau Derby G1 - (1) - Analyst (2003)

Singapore

- Committee's Prize G3 - (1) - Diamond Dust (2006)

Qatar

- Umm Bab Cup - (1) - Al Uraiq Secret (2016)

Malaysia

- Sprint Trophy G1 (1) - Triple Happy (2006)
