= Un étrange voyage =

1981 French drama film

- Directed by: Alain Cavalier
- Written by: Camille de Casabianca
- Produced by: Danièle Delorme
- Starring: Jean Rochefort; Camille de Casabianca
- Cinematography: Jean-François Robin
- Edited by: Joëlle Hache
- Music by: Maurice Leroux
- Distributed by: Planfilm
- Release date: 4 February 1981
- Running time: 100 minutes
- Country: France
- Language: French

Un étrange voyage is a 1981 French drama film directed by Alain Cavalier, starring Jean Rochefort and writer/filmmaker Camille de Casabianca. The film won the Prix Louis-Delluc in 1980.

== Plot ==
Pierre, in Paris on his own in his forties and working as a picture restorer, has little contact with his daughter Amélie, a student who he supports, and none with his ex-wife Claire. His closest relationship is with his 80-year-old widowed mother, still active in her house in Troyes, who telephones to say she is taking a train that afternoon to visit him. She is not on the train, nor the next one. In the morning he drives to Troyes and, with a policeman and a locksmith, breaks into the tidy but empty house.

Pierre is convinced that she did take the train as she said and, by accident or malice, fell from it before reaching Paris. Amélie, on vacation after doing well in her exams, agrees with his reasoning and the two get permission from the railway company to search the 150 kilometres of track. For days on end they comb the verges, spending the nights in little rural hotels. They fool around and fight, share each other's thoughts and then part in a rage. Never have the two been so close.

One day, Amélie stumbles on the remains of her grandmother. Knowing now the emotional fragility of her father, she gets him to take her for a good dinner with lots of wine and, once he is relaxed with a pretty young woman, breaks the news to him. The pair have been brought together by tragedy, but will now have to resume their separate lives.

== Cast ==
- Jean Rochefort as Pierre
- Camille de Casabianca as Amélie
- Arlette Bonnard as Claire
- Dominique Besnehard as Marc
- Hubert Saint-Macary as The examiner
- François Berléand as The rogue witness
- Patrick Depeyrrat as The southern teller
- Roland Amstutz as The track supervisor
- Gérard Chaillou as The SNCF executive
- Alain Lachassagne as The locksmith
- Patrick Bonnel as The SNCF agent
