= Southern France =

Geographical area of France

Southern France Le Midi (French) Lo Miègjorn (Occitan) Hegoaldea (Basque) U Mezziornu (Corsican) U Mejodi (Monégasque) Migdia (Catalan)
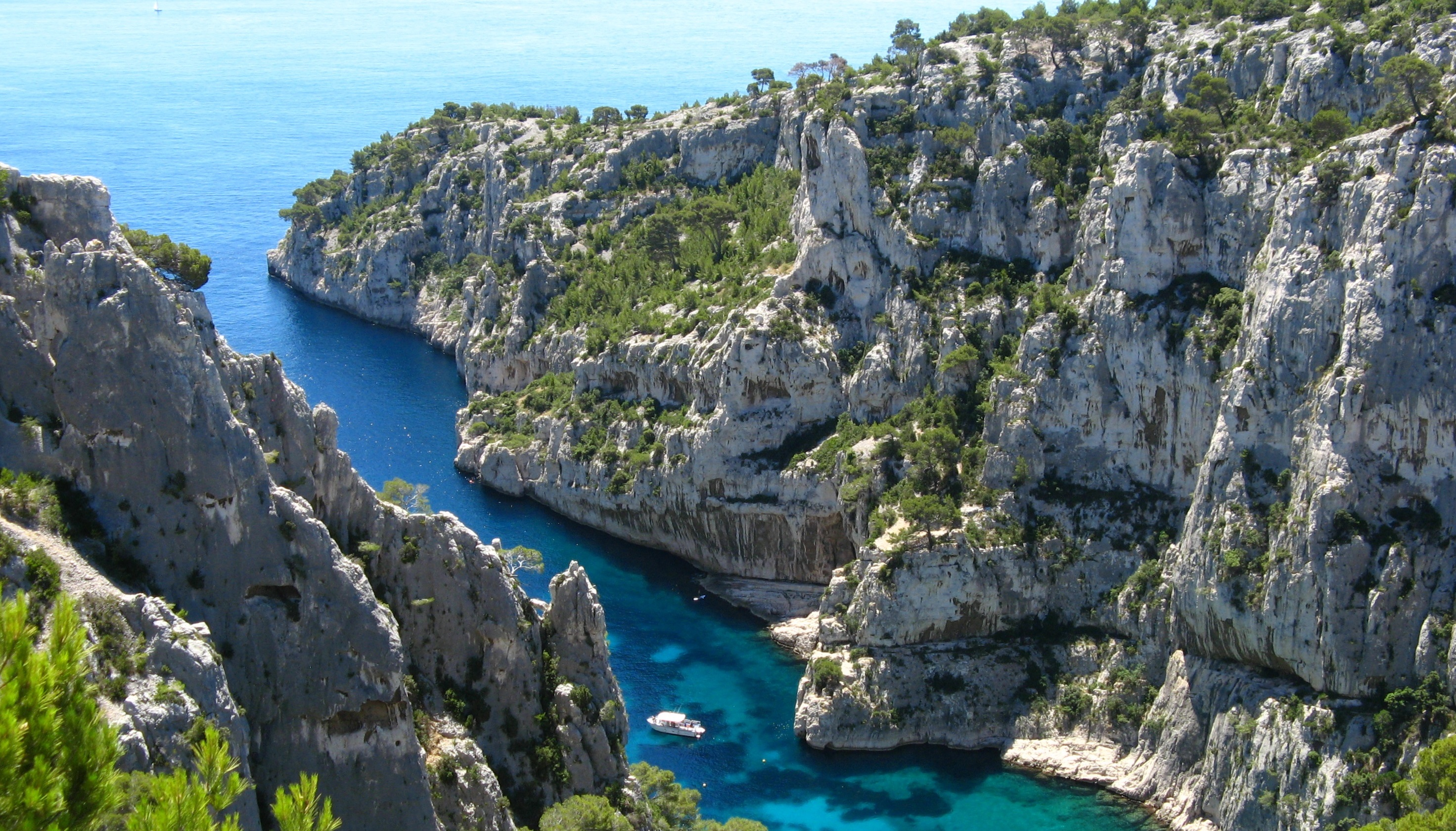
- Calanques National Park between Marseille and Cassis, in Bouches-du-Rhône

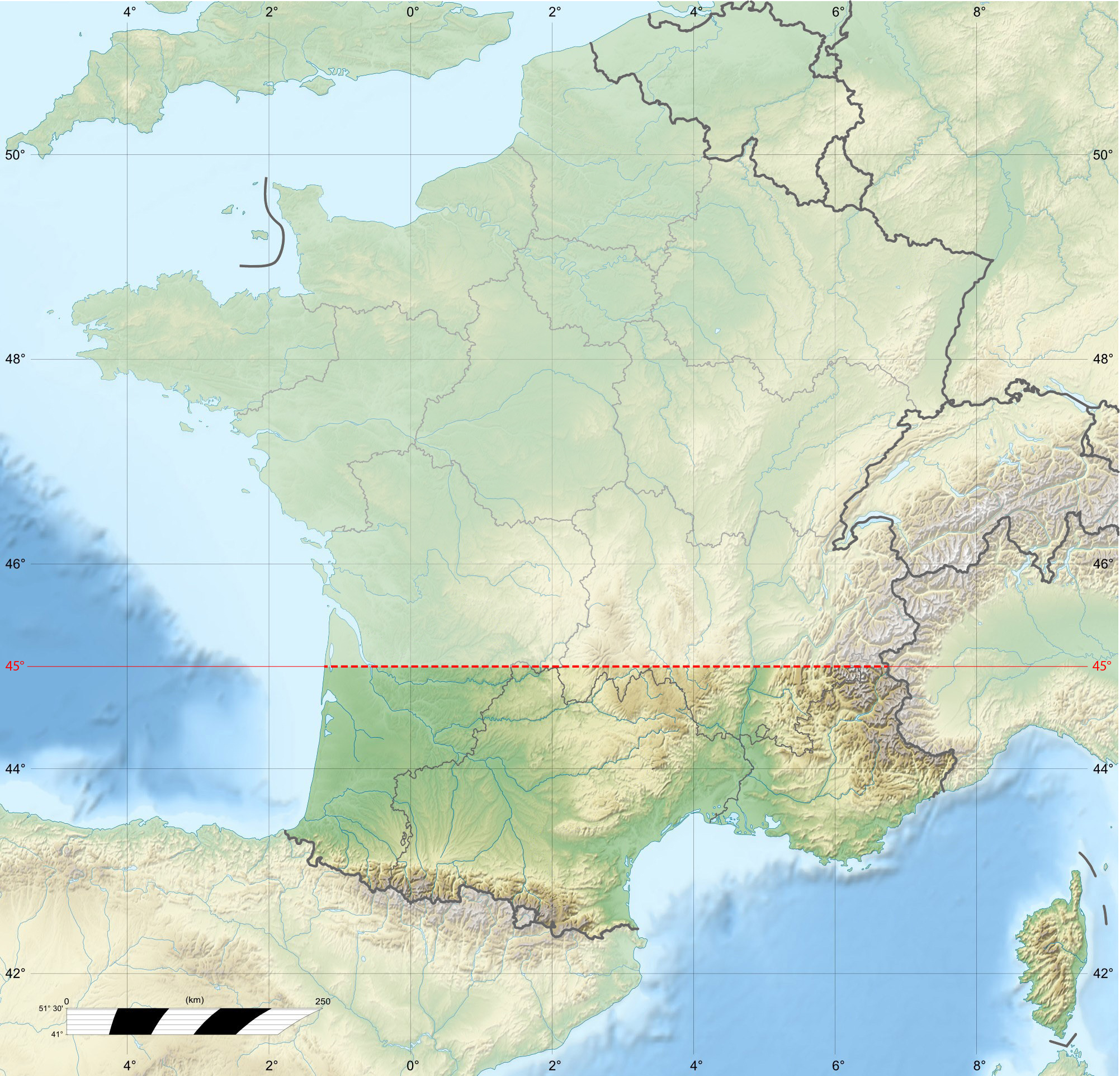
- Southern France, based on a split along the 45th parallel
- Country: France

Southern France, also known as the south of France or colloquially in French as le Midi, is a geographical area consisting of the regions of France that border the Atlantic Ocean south of the Marais Poitevin, Spain, the Mediterranean Sea and Italy. It includes southern Nouvelle-Aquitaine in the west, Occitania in the centre, the southern parts of Auvergne-Rhône-Alpes in the northeast, Provence-Alpes-Côte d'Azur in the southeast, as well as the island of Corsica in the southeast. Southern France is generally considered part of southern Europe because of its association with the Mediterranean Sea.

The colloquial French name for the region, le Midi, is derived from an Old French compound composed of mi ("middle") and di ("day"), meaning literally "midday". Thus, the term is comparable in both origin and meaning to Mezzogiorno, which indicates southern Italy, and Romanian Miazăzi which is a synonym for south – the direction of the Sun at "midday".

== Geography ==
The area corresponds in large part to Occitania in southern Europe, the historical and cultural region in which Occitan (French: langue d'oc), as distinct from the langues d'oïl of northern France, was the predominant language. Despite being part of Occitania, the regions of Auvergne and Limousin are not normally considered part of southern France. The largest cities of southern France are Marseille, Toulouse, Bordeaux, Nice and Montpellier. The Pyrenees and French Alps are also located in the area, in respectively its southwestern and eastern parts. Corsica, which is south of Continental France and just north of Sardinia, Italy, may also be included.

== Tourism ==
Notable touristic landmarks include the Roman-era Pont du Gard and the Arena of Nîmes; the Verdon Gorge, in Alpes-de-Haute-Provence; the Canal du Midi, linking Toulouse by to the Mediterranean Sea; and the natural regions of Larzac, Luberon and Camargue. The French Riviera is in southern France's southeastern quadrant. Several towns in southern France are renowned for their architecture and surroundings, such as Roussillon, Ménerbes, Cordes-sur-Ciel, Gordes, Rocamadour, Rennes-le-Château, Les Baux-de-Provence, Lourmarin, Gassin, Saint-Paul-de-Vence, L'Isle-sur-la-Sorgue, Seillans, Crillon-le-Brave and Saint-Rémy-de-Provence.

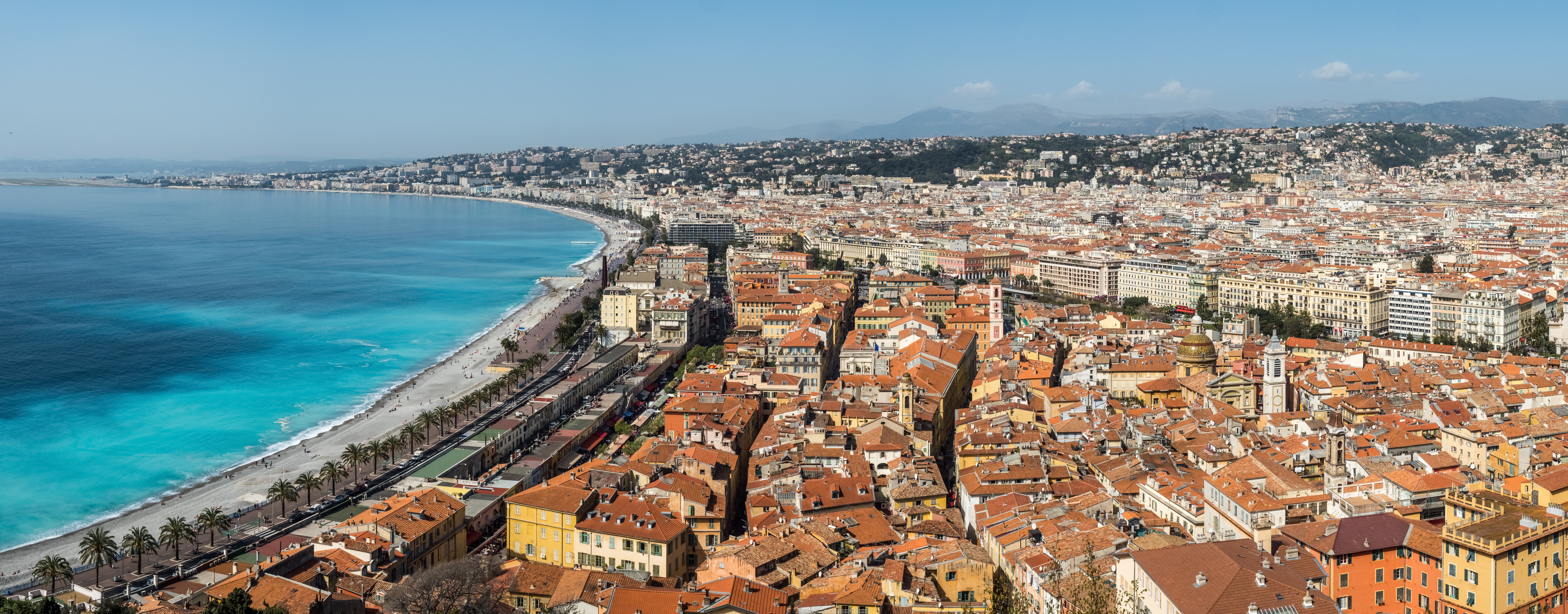
Nice has been a UNESCO World Heritage Site since 2021.

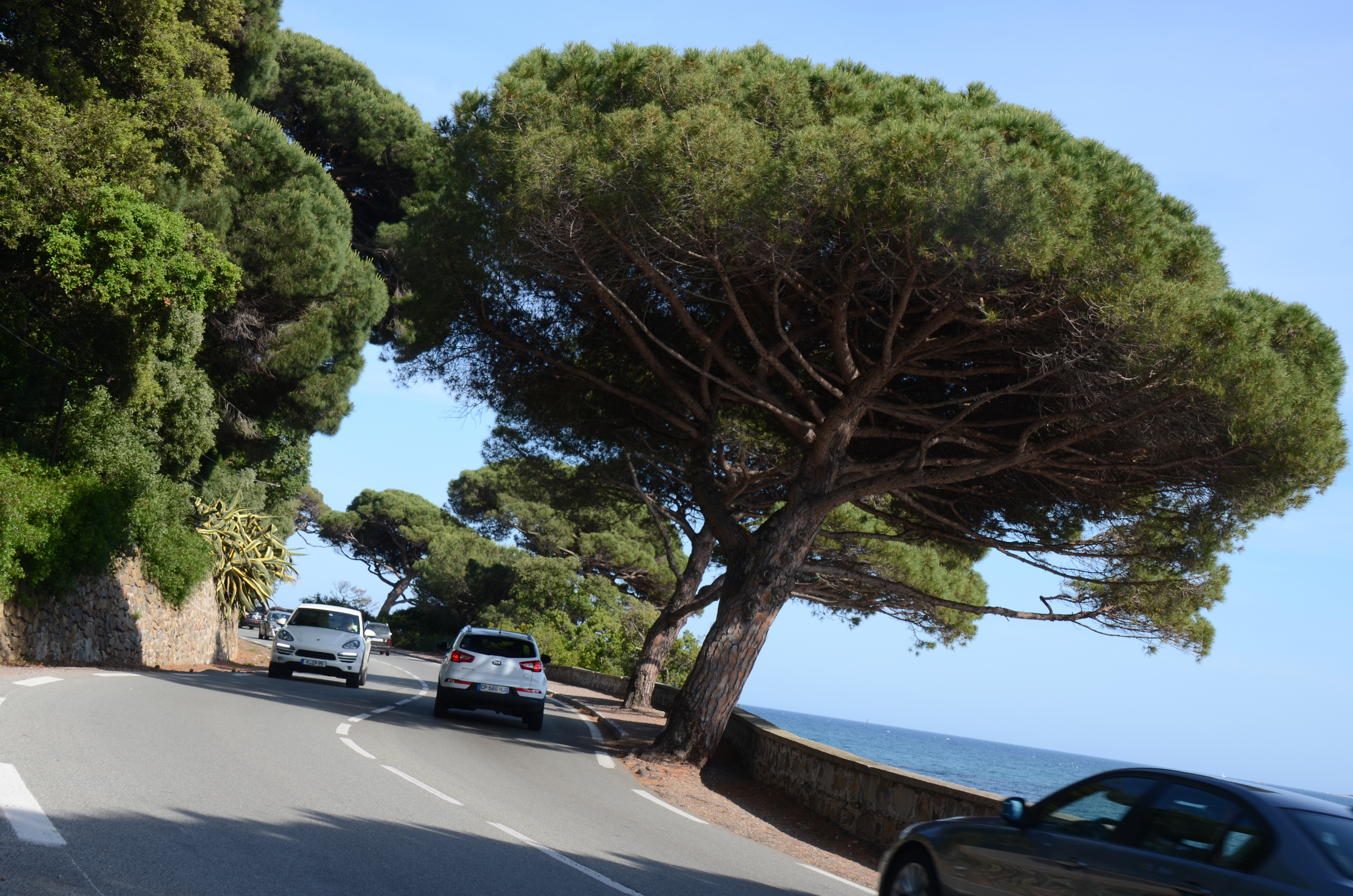
Coastal road near Sainte-Maxime

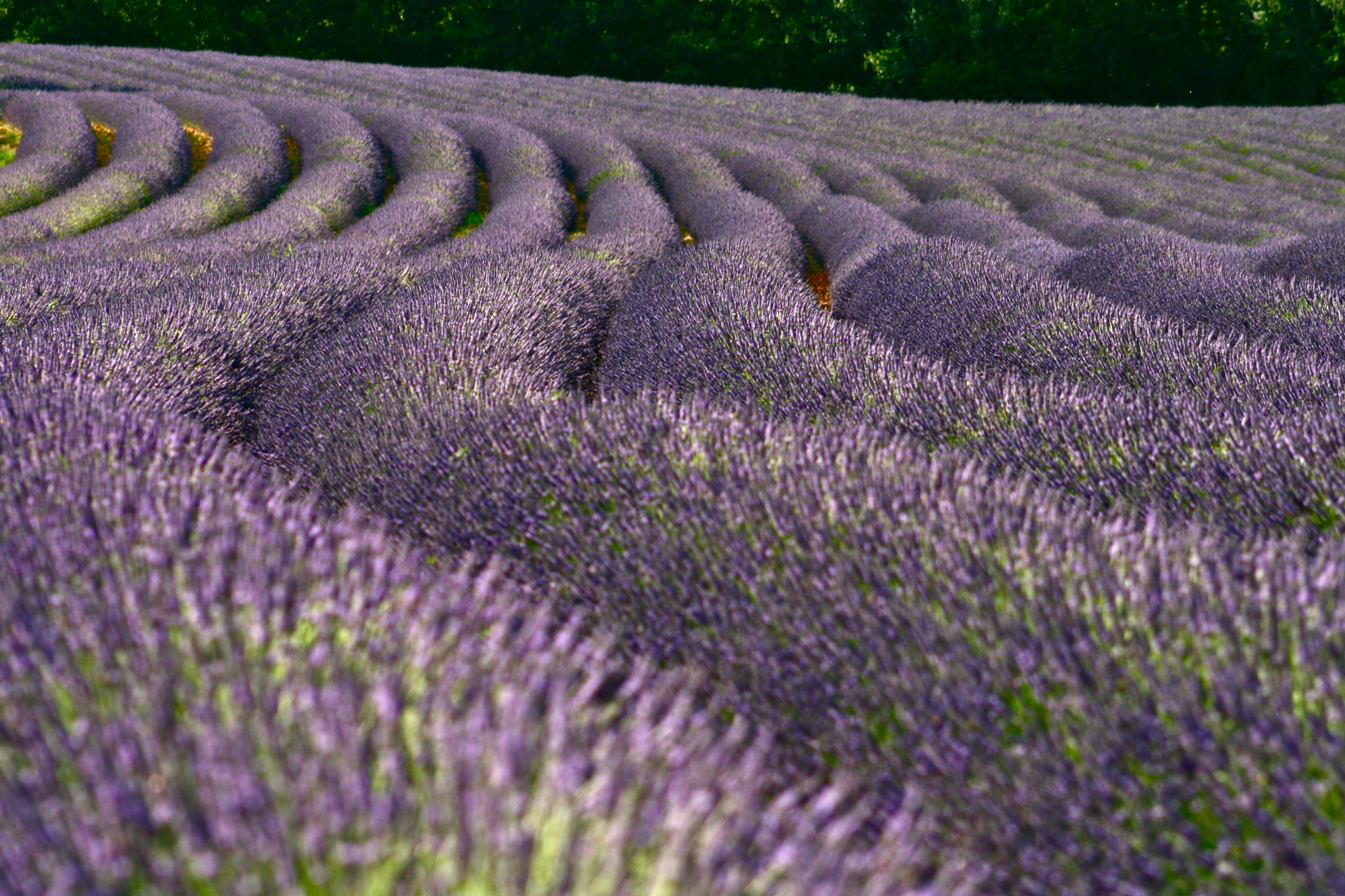
Lavender fields, a well-known feature of southern France, are mainly in Provence.

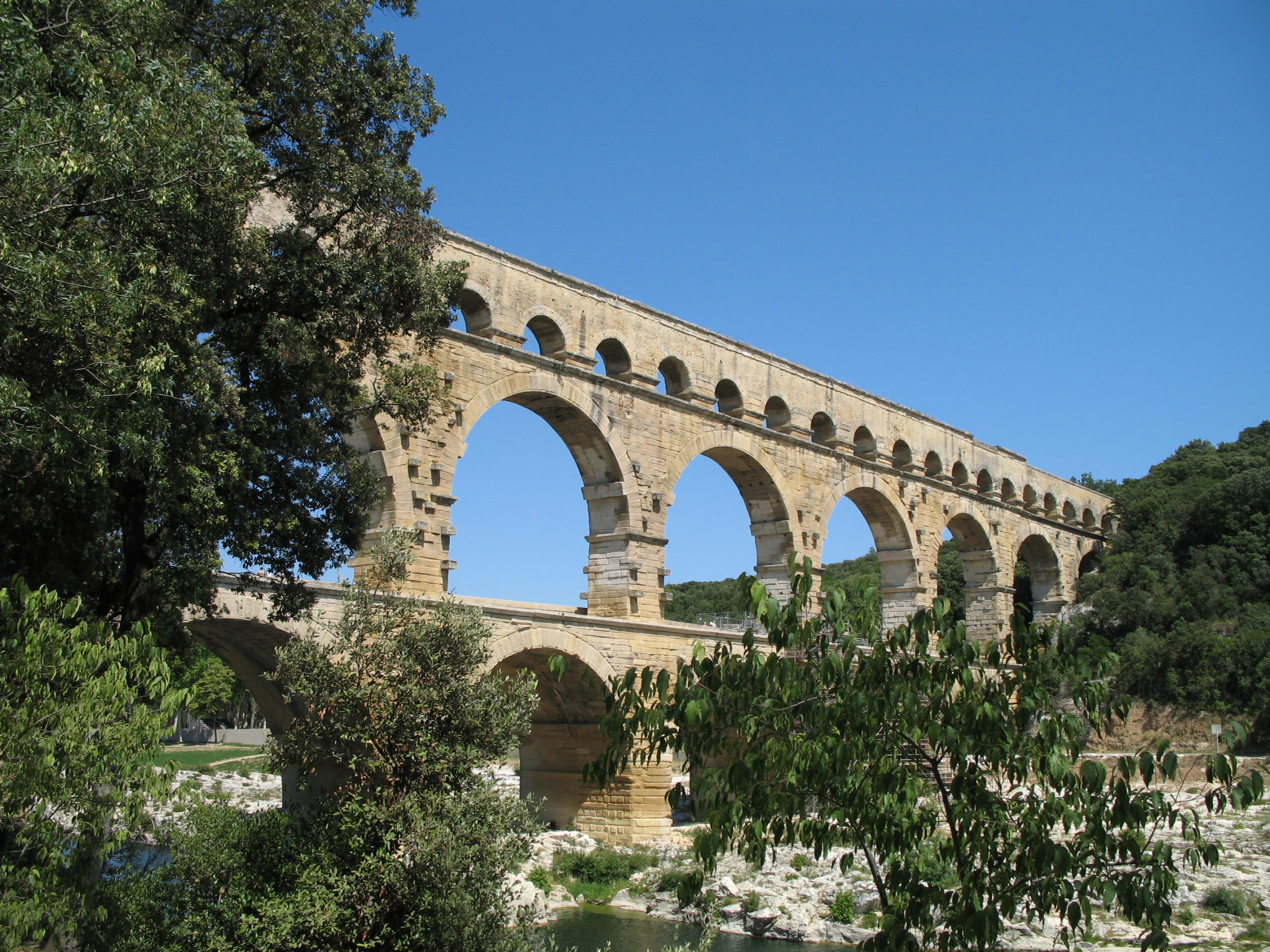
Pont du Gard, a UNESCO World Heritage Site

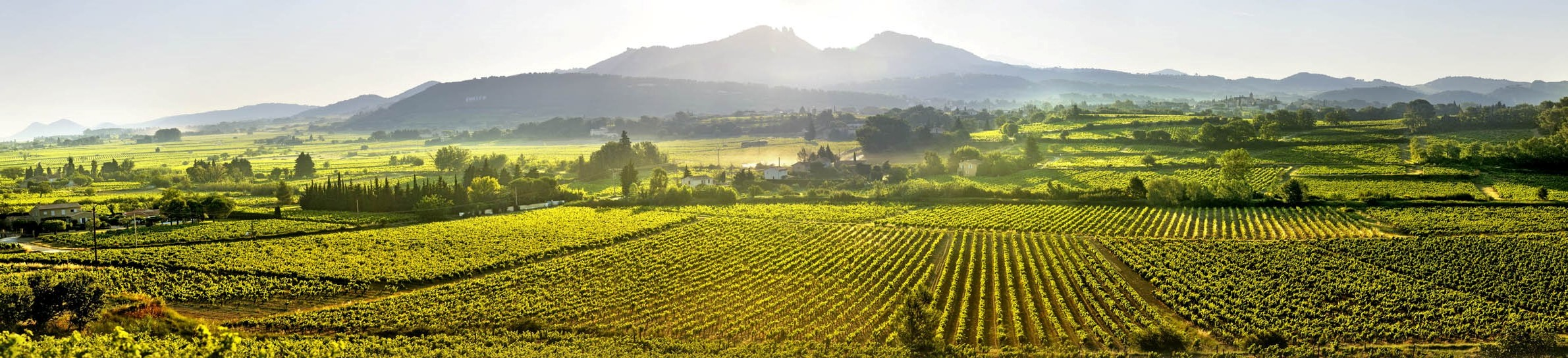
View of Vaucluse vineyards producing Provence wine

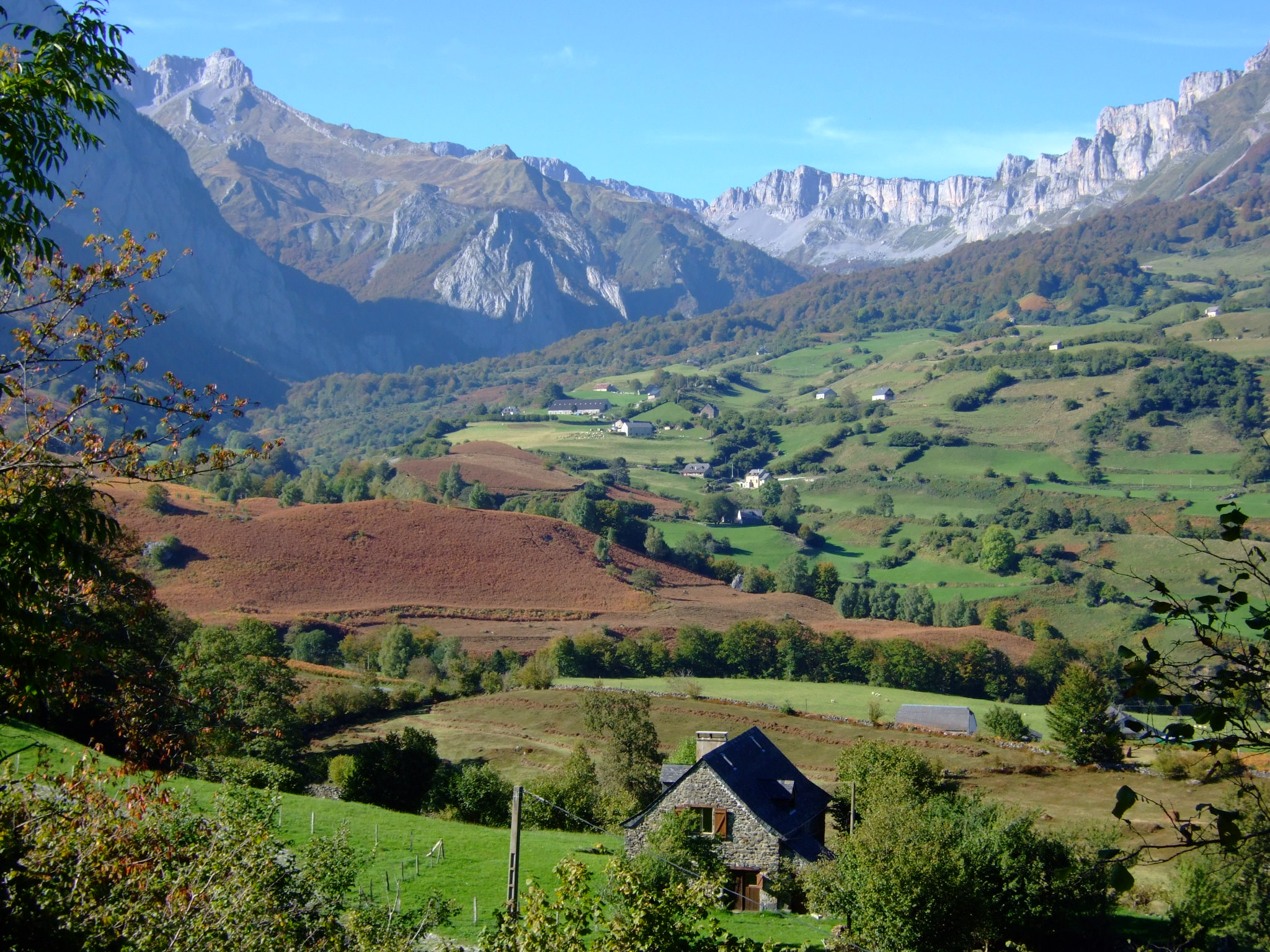
Traditional landscape of the historical province of Béarn, in Pyrénées-Atlantiques

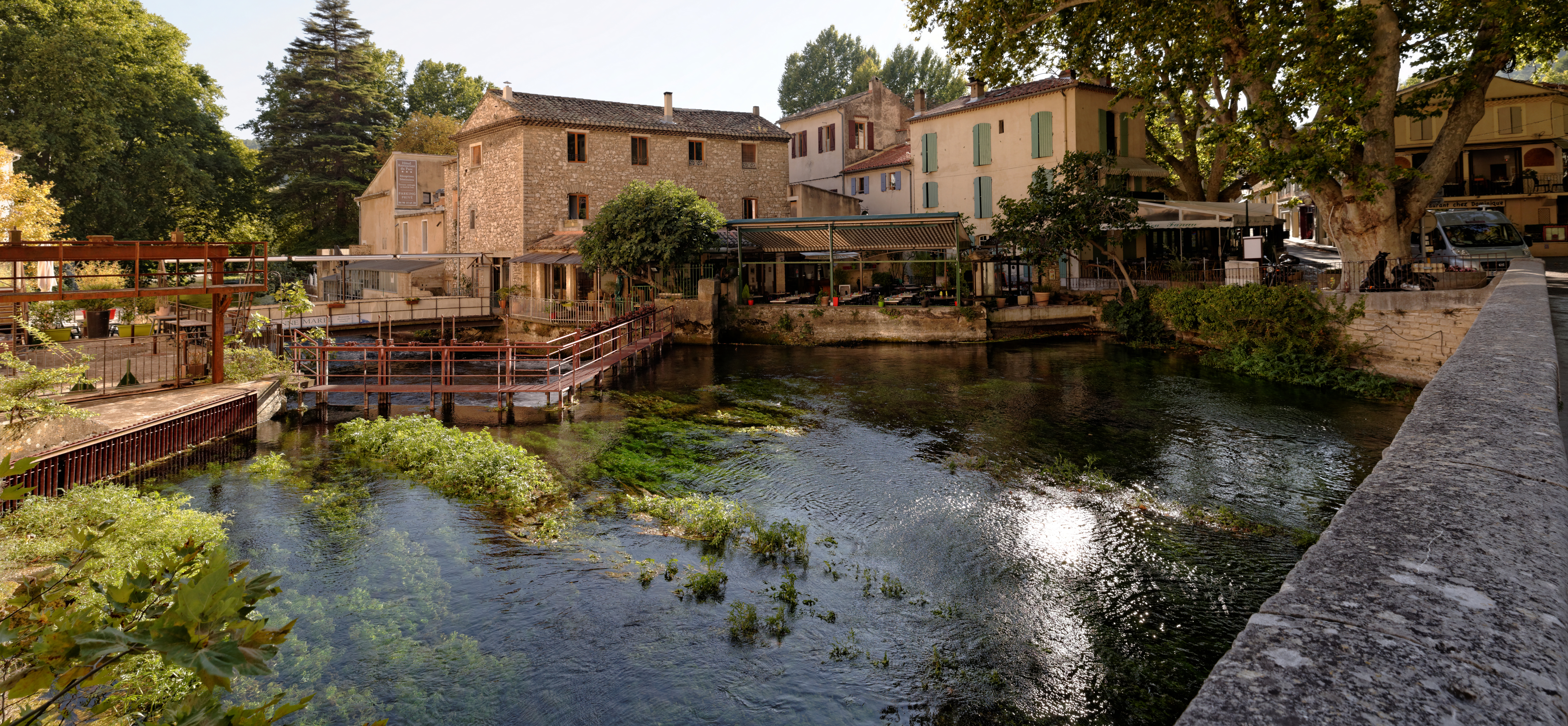
Village of Fontaine-de-Vaucluse, near Avignon

== Cuisine ==
Southern France has a cuisine that is different from those of northern France and other Mediterranean countries. The major difference from the rest of France is in the use of olive oil, instead of butter. Local agriculture supplies the olives for consumption as well as cooking, the ducks and geese to make foie gras, haricot beans that are used in cassoulet, the sheep whose milk produces Roquefort cheese, tomatoes and melons. To accompany the richer food, the area also supplies much stronger wines, from Bordeaux, Cahors, Madiran, and Languedoc, all of which are washed down with brandy from Armagnac.

== Films ==
The following films are set in southern France:

- To Catch a Thief (1955)
- Summer Holiday (1963)
- Pierrot le Fou (1965)
- The Sucker (1965)
- Lacombe, Lucien (1974)
- French Connection II (1975)
- Never Say Never Again (1983)
- Under the Cherry Moon (1986)
- Jean de Florette (1986)
- Manon des Sources (1986)
- Dirty Rotten Scoundrels (1988)
- Happiness Is in the Field (1995)
- GoldenEye (1995)
- Taxi (1998)
- Chocolat (2000)
- The Transporter (2002)
- Swimming Pool (2003)
- Le Grand Voyage (2004)
- Priceless (2006)
- The Grocer's Son (2007)
- Mr. Bean's Holiday (2007)
- Amer (2009)
- Magic in the Moonlight (2014)
- Johnny English Strikes Again (2018)

== See also ==
- Béarn
- Corsica
- French Riviera
- Gascony
- Mediterranean Sea
- Northern Basque Country
- Northern Catalonia
- Novempopulania
- Occitania
- Southern Europe
- Southern Italy
- Vichy France
