= The Grocer's Son =

2007 French film

- French: Le Fils de l'épicier
- Directed by: Éric Guirado
- Screenplay by: Éric Guirado; Florence Vignon
- Produced by: Miléna Poylo; Gilles Sacuto
- Starring: Nicolas Cazalé; Clotilde Hesme
- Cinematography: Laurent Brunet
- Edited by: Pierre Haberer
- Music by: Christophe Boutin
- Production companies: TS Production; Rhône-Alpes Cinéma; StudioCanal
- Distributed by: Les Films du Losange
- Release date: 15 August 2007 (France)
- Running time: 96 minutes
- Country: France
- Language: French
- Budget: $1.5 million
- Box office: $5.1 million

The Grocer's Son (French : Le Fils de l'épicier) is a 2007 French drama film about a family that runs a grocery business in Provence, France; the business includes a single truck that travels the countryside making deliveries to customers. The director, Éric Guirado, had previously made television documentaries about traveling grocers in rural France. The film, released in France as Le Fils de l'épicier, was first presented as part of the 2007 Namur Francophone Film Festival. It was sufficiently successful that in 2008 subtitled versions were released internationally.

== Synopsis ==
It concerns Antoine (played by Nicolas Cazalé), who must leave Lyon to help his mother (Jeanne Goupil) who runs the family grocery store in a village in Southern France. His father (Daniel Duval), stricken with a heart attack, can no longer drive the grocery truck that supplies the isolated hamlets around the village. Antoine discovers the charm of these people, "bons vivants" (good living) ways and gradually comes to love his eccentric customers and finds the country of his childhood. He also discovers the joy of living and perhaps the joy of love with Claire (played by Clotilde Hesme).

The film uses the beautiful landscape of Mont Sainte-Victoire as a regular backdrop.

== Cast ==
- Nicolas Cazalé as Antoine Sforza (the Grocer's son).
- Clotilde Hesme as Claire.
- Daniel Duval as Antoine's father, the proprietor of Alimentation Générale (lit. Grocery).
- Jeanne Goupil as Antoine's mother and the proprietress.
- Stéphan Guérin-Tillié as François Sforza (Antoine's brother).
- Liliane Rovère as Lucienne (a customer).
- Paul Crachet as Le Père Clèment.
- Chad Chenouga as Hassan.
- Benoit Giros as Fernand.
- Ludmila Ruoso as Sophie.

== Other credits ==
- Producers - Miléna Poyle and Gilles Sacuto
- Music - Christophe Boutin
- Production record—TS Production, Rhône-Alpes Cinéma, StudioCanal
- Location - Rosans, commune in Provence

== Reception ==
The film received good reviews from several noted critics writing in English. Roger Ebert wrote, "The summer unfolds slowly. Claire goes back to Paris. The father arrives from Paris. The countryside is calm and seductive. The mother soldiers on, keeping the store open late "to help people." And Antoine comes of age. That's all the film is, apart from having humor, warmth, kindness, insight and scenery. That's enough."

Nicolas Cazale was nominated for the César Award for Most Promising Actor (the French Academy Award) for his performance as the Grocer's son.

== Home media ==
The Grocer's Son was released as a region 1 DVD in 2009 with English subtitles. A region 2 DVD was also released in 2009.
