= List of Caméra Café episodes =

The following is a list of episodes of the French comedy series, Caméra Café. It aired from September 2001 to December 2004.

== Season 1 (2001) ==
1 (1-1): Sylvain's Birthday (L'anniversaire de Sylvain)
2 (1-2): Mougier (Mougier)
3 (1-3): Goalkeeper (Gardien de but)
4 (1-4): Tragic night (Nuit tragique)
5 (1-5): Harassment (Harcèlement)
6 (1-6): The big office (Le grand bureau)
7 (1-7): Leaving doo (Pot de départ)
8 (1-8): Temporal paradox (Paradoxe temporel)
9 (1-9): Killing move (Le geste qui tue)
10 (1-10): What are you doing this evening ? (Qu'est-ce que tu fais ce soir ?)
11 (1-11): Annabelle (Annabelle)
12 (1-12): Paid leave (Congés payés)
13 (1-13): Corporate Movie (Film d'entreprise)
14 (1-14): Roland Garros (Roland Garros)
15 (1-15): Restriction of budget (Restriction de budget)
16 (1-16): Good catch (Le bon coup)
17 (1-17): Homonymism (Homonymie)
18 (1-18): The licence (Le permis)
19 (1-19): All registered (Tous fichés)
20 (1-20): Sales force (Force de vente)
21 (1-21): Coffee transgenic (Le café transgénique)
22 (1-22): Bonus (La prime)
23 (1-23): Exhibition (L'exposition)
24 (1-24): The bomb (La bombe)
25 (1-25): lunch Invitation (Invitation à déjeuner)
26 (1-26): Job interview (Entretien d'embauche)
27 (1-27): The return (Le retour)
28 (1-28): Communicating vases (Vases communicants)
29 (1-29): Strikes (Jour de grèves)
30 (1-30): Elections (Les élections)
31 (1-31): Seminary (Le séminaire)
32 (1-32): Epidemic (Epidémie)
33 (1-33): Tango (Tango)
34 (1-34): The disabled person (L'handicapé)
35 (1-35): The color of money (La couleur de l'argent)
36 (1-36): Medical examination (La visite médicale)
37 (1-37): The letter (La lettre)
38 (1-38): corporate winter vacation (A la neige avec le C.E)
39 (1-39): The buffoon (Le clown)
40 (1-40): spitting image (Portrait craché)
41 (1-41): Questions answers (Questions réponses)
42 (1-42): The paranoid (Le parano)
43 (1-43): The weekend (Le week-end)
44 (1-44): A month in Poland (Un mois en Pologne)
45 (1-45): The consultant (Le consultant)
46 (1-46): The Farm (La ferme)
47 (1-47): The Guard (Le vigile)
48 (1-48): Caramel (Caramel)
49 (1-49): Resign (Démissionner)
50 (1-50): HR Blues (Le blues du DRH)
51 (1-51): Out of Order (En Panne)
52 (1-52): A Gay Mate (Un pote gay)
53 (1-53): Good Sign (Bon Signe)
54 (1-54): The Chief's Kitchen (La Cuisine du Chef)
55 (1-55): Headhunter (Chasseur de Tête)
56 (1-56): Dialogue of the Deaf (Dialogue de Sourd)
57 (1-57): Dark Thoughts(Idées Noires)
58 (1-58): The Little Beast (La Petite Bête)
59 (1-59): When I Grow Up (Quand je serais Grand)
60 (1-60): Interim (Interim)
61 (1-61): Damage (Dommage)
62 (1-62): The Leek and Bitch (Le Poireau et la Salope)
63 (1-63): Disability Pension (Pension d'invalidité)
64 (1-64): Double Fracture (Double Fracture)
65 (1-65): Mrs. Sorel is Retiring (Mme Sorel part en retraite)
66 (1-66): Canary's Theory (La Théorie du Canari)
67 (1-67): Expense (Note de Frais)
68 (1-68): Golf (Golf)
69 (1-69): Transit Strike: Part 1 (Grève des Transports 1ère Partie)
70 (1-70): Transit Strike: Part 2 (Grève des Transports 2ème Partie)
71 (1-71): Engineering Calculation (Le Génie du Calcul)
72 (1-72): Company Commits (Le CE)
73 (1-73): The Words to Say (Les Mots pour le Dire)
74 (1-74): Pizza (Pizza)
75 (1-75): Part Golf (La Partie de Golf)
76 (1-76): The Removal (Le Déménagement)
77 (1-77): It Falls Stack (Ca Tombe Pile)
78 (1-78): Open Space (Open Space)
79 (1-79): The Specialist (Le Spécialiste)
80 (1-80): Team Spirit (L'Esprit d'équipe)
81 (1-81): A Stupid Challenge (Un Pari à la Con)
82 (1-82): U.S. Imperialism (Impérialisme américain)
83 (1-83): Fatal Mixion (Mixion Fatale)
84 (1-84): Telethon (Le Téléthon)
85 (1-85): Conspiracy (Complot)
86 (1-86): The Big Leap (Le Grand Saut)
87 (1-87): The Fire Alarm (L'Alerte au Feu)
88 (1-88): Leave me a Message (Laissez-moi un Message)
89 (1-89): Sexual Harassment (Harcèlement Sexuel)
90 (1-90): The Finding (Le Constat)
91 (1-91): A Good Company (Une Bonne Boîte)
92 (1-92): Accounting Error (Erreur Comptable)
93 (1-93): Pregnant (Enceinte)
94 (1-94): The Raven (Le Corbeau)
95 (1-95): The Question of Commercial (Le Doute du Commercial)
96 (1-96): Of All the Colors (De Toutes les Couleurs)
97 (1-97): Bad Back (Mauvais Fond)
98 (1-98): Shared Twist (Tords Partagés)
99 (1-99): Pater (Le Pater)
100 (1-100): Insemination (Insémination)
101 (1-101): Bad Mood (La Mauvaise Humeur)
102 (1-102): State of Shock (Etat de Choc)
103 (1-103): The Mobile (Le Portable)
104 (1-104): Meditation (Méditation)
105 (1-105): Old Memories (Les Vieux Souvenirs)
106 (1-106): The Look (The Look)
107 (1-107): A Load of Revenge (A Charge de Revanche)
108 (1-108): The Young Intern (Le Jeune Stagiaire)
109 (1-109): My Friend Annie (Mon Amie Annie)
110 (1-110): Express Delivery (Livraison Express)
111 (1-111): Live Oldest (Vivez Plus Vieux)
112 (1-112): The Flowchart (L'Organigramme)
113 (1-113): Bear in Mind (Supporter dans l'âme)
114 (1-114): Petition (La Pétition)
115 (1-115): John Molkovich (John Malkovich)
116 (1-116): Orgasm (L'orgasme)
117 (1-117): Invitation (L'invitation)
118 (1-118): Beasts' Life (La Vie des Bêtes)
119 (1-119): Holy Maéva (Sainte Maéva)
120 (1-120): Band Wagon (Tous en scène)
121 (1-121): Carole's Day (La Journée de Carole)
122 (1-122): Wanton (Déréglée)
123 (1-123): Lounge (Le Salon)
124 (1-124): Stamped (Timbrée)
125 (1-125): The Trophy (Le Trophée)
126 (1-126): Harmony (Harmonie)
127 (1-127): Burial (L'enterrement)
128 (1-128): Excuse (L'excuse)
129 (1-129): A Perfect Man (Un Homme Parfait)
130 (1-130): Valetudinarian (Valétudinaire)
131 (1-131): Little Bird (Le Petit Oiseau)
132 (1-132): Culture (Culture)
133 (1-133): Seller to Cool (Vendeur à la Cool)
134 (1-134): Poem (Poème)
135 (1-135): Iron Woman (Dame de Fer)
136 (1-136): Stand (Le Stand)
137 (1-137): The Friend (L'Ami)
138 (1-138): Hervé In Love (Hervé In Love)
139 (1-139): Reintegration (Réinsertion)
140 (1-140): Bingo (Le Loto)
141 (1-141): Voted (A Voté)
142 (1-142): Bias (Préjugé)
143 (1-143): Sylvain's Birthday (2): The Surprise (L'anniv' à Sylvain)
144 (1-144): Psychological Type (Le Psychotype)
145 (1-145): Roses (Les Roses)
146 (1-146): Best-seller (Le Best-seller)
147 (1-147): Gone with the Wind (Autant en Emporte le Vent)
148 (1-148): No Zob In Job (No Zob In Job)
149 (1-149): Polecats (Le Putois)
150 (1-150): The Bride came from the Cold (Le Fiancée venue du Froid)
151 (1-151): Road Man (Le Routier)
152 (1-152): Film Club (Ciné-Club)
153 (1-153): Bad Mood (2) (Mauvais Poil)
154 (1-154): Tattoo (Tatouage)
155 (1-155): Charcoal (Au Charbon)
156 (1-156): Desktop Share (Bureau à Partager)
157 (1-157): Accident (L'Accident)
158 (1-158): Rendezvous (Rendez-vous)
159 (1-159): Matter of Principle (Question de Principe)
160 (1-160): Korrect (Korrect)
161 (1-161): Jeanne's Bridegroom (Le Fiancée de Jeanne)
162 (1-162): Mail (Le Courrier)
163 (1-163): A Simple Trick (Un Truc Simple)
164 (1-164): Hot Date (Rencard)
165 (1-165): Uncomfortable Situation (Situation Inconfortable)
166 (1-166): The Return (Une Revenante)
167 (1-167): Portefolio (Le Portefeuille)
168 (1-168): Battling J.C. (Battling J.C.)
169 (1-169): Fresh News (Nouvelles Fraîches)
170 (1-170): Sports' Club (Club de Sports)
171 (1-171): Radio Station of Corner (Radio du Coin)

== Season 2 (2002) ==
173 (2-01) : Close Friend's Secret (Secret Intime)
174 (2-02) : Forgetting (L'Oubli)
175 (2-03) : Handsome (Beau Gosse)
176 (2-04) : Travel, Travel (Voyage, Voyage)
177 (2-05) : Wanted (Avis de Recherche)
178 (2-06) : Family Concerns (Soucis Familiaux)
179 (2-07) : Masked Avenger (Vengeur Masqué)
180 (2-08) : The Doll who Says No (La Poupée qui dit non)
181 (2-09) : Jeanne's Quest (La Quête de Jeanne)
182 (2-10) : Blood Donation (Don de Sang)
183 (2-11) : Get Covered (Sortez Couverts)
184 (2-12) : World's Champion (Champion du Monde)
185 (2-13) : Mythomaniac (Mythomaniac)
186 (2-14) : Black List (La Liste de Jean-Guy)
187 (2-15) : Piou-Piou (Piou-Piou)
188 (2-16) : Repair (Réparation)
189 (2-17) : Good Work (Bonne œuvre)
190 (2-18) : Political Fight (Combat Politique)
191 (2-19) : Chase Tonight (Du Gibier ce Soir)
192 (2-20) : Jean-Guy Bulk (Jean-Guy en vrac)
193 (2-21) : Thanks Jeanne (Merci Jeanne)
194 (2-22) : Zero Tolerance (Tolérance Zéro)
195 (2-23) : Key Bis (Touche Bis)
196 (2-24) : Party Time (C'est la Fête)
197 (2-25) : Strand of Thrush (Brin de Muguet)
198 (2-26) : The Veceshky (Le Veceshky)
199 (2-27) : Cartomancy (Cartomancie)
200 (2-28) : Surprise Photographs (Photos Surprises)
201 (2-29) : Friendly Prices (Prix d'Ami)
202 (2-30) : The Mutant (Le Mutant)
203 (2-31) : On Edge (A Fleur de Peau)
204 (2-32) : Bottling (Mise en Bouteille)
205 (2-33) : Covenant's System (Le Système Convenant)
206 (2-34) : A Man Under Influence (Un Homme Sous Influence)
205 (2-35) : Jeanne's Sedatives (Jeanne Calmant)
206 (2-36) : Twins (Jumelles)
