= Caméra Café =

- Logo of Caméra Café, French version.
- Created by: Bruno Solo; Yvan Le Bolloc'h; Alain Kappauf
- Starring: Bruno Solo; Yvan Le Bolloc'h
- Country of origin: France
- Original language: French
- No. of episodes: 207 (list of episodes)

Production
- Producer: Jean-Yves Robin
- Camera setup: Single camera
- Running time: 7 minutes

Original release
- Network: Paris Première
- Release: 3 September 2001 – 31 December 2004

Caméra Café is a French-born format of comedy television series exported around the world. Two movie spin-offs have been made in France under the titles of Espace détente and Le Séminaire. It was originally a French television show created by Bruno Solo, Yvan Le Bolloc'h, and Alain Kappauf and it was broadcast from September 2001 to December 2004 on the Paris Première channel.

700 episodes of 3 minutes each have been produced and were broadcast again on M6 in 2004. The show revolves around a dysfunctional office. Its originality stems from the fact that, within the fiction, the camera is fixed into the automated coffee machine of the office space.

The title is a French pun on "Caméra Cachée", (literally "hidden camera", or Candid Camera for the related TV show).

== Plot ==
The main originality of the series is the coffee machine, located in the relaxation area of the company, which becomes the point of view of the viewer during each episode. In front of it, parade the employees of the company "Geugène Electro Stim" (G.E.S.) all are caricatured to the grotesque humor, even cynical at times.

This place of choice allows the viewer to live from within the everyday atmosphere of the head office of a large company in the French (such as the presence of a driver for the president, a director of human resources and 'a full-time psychologist), with professional or private discussions that often turn into caricatures.

Some extras pass from time to time down the hall and sometimes serve as spectators in some skits at strategic moments.

== Cast ==
=== Main ===
- Bruno Solo as Hervé Dumont, Purchasing director and Union representative
- Yvan Le Bolloc'h as Jean-Claude Convenant, Commercial

=== Secondary ===
- Armelle as Maéva Capucin, Head of archives and inventory and Carole's assistant
- Alexandre Pesle as Sylvain Müller, Accountant
- Jeanne Savary as Jeanne Bignon, Secretary and Jean-Guy's assistant
- Gérard Chaillou as Jean-Guy Lecointre, Chief human resources officer
- Valérie Decobert as Frédérique Castelli, Nancy's secretary
- Alain Bouzigues as Philippe Gatin, Network administrator
- Shirley Bousquet as Nancy Langeais, Chief financial officer
- Sylvie Loeillet as Carole Dussier-Belmont, Chief commercial officer
- Philippe Cura as André Markowicz, Chauffeur
- Noémie Elbaz as Julie Hassan, Switchboard operator
- Karim Adda as Vincent Schneider, Postal service employee
- Marc Andréoni as Serge Touati, Company psychologist
- Chantal Neuwirth as Annie Lepoutre, Trainee
- Tom Novembre as Stanislas Priziwielsky, Digix's accountant
- Sophie Renoir as Eva Kovalsky, Carole 's substitute during her illness
- Lucien Jean-Baptiste as Franck Marchand

=== Guest ===
- Aïssa Maïga as Violette, Jean-Claude's ex
- Bruno Lochet as Didier Farjex, The chef of the canteen
- Bruno Salomone as Thierry
- Catherine Benguigui as Mireille
- Catherine Jacob as The interior designer
- Chantal Lauby as Emma
- Christelle Cornil as Yvonne, The maintenance employee
- Édith Scob as Madame Bouvard
- Élie Semoun as The Security guard
- Fred Testot as The window cleaner
- Guillaume Depardieu as Simon, a former prisoner in reintegration
- Gustave Kervern as The plumber
- Mathilda May as The Boss's wife
- Pascal Obispo as himself
- Raphaël Lenglet as Dimitri, Eva's son
- Riton Liebman as The director
- Valérie Mairesse as Anabelle, depressed cleaning lady

== Adaptations ==
Caméra Café has seen great export success, having been adapted in:

- United States (failed pilot)
- Republic of Ireland (2002–2003)
- Canada / Quebec (2002–2012, 2021–)
- Greece (2002)
- Italy (2003–2008; 2011–2012; 2017)
- Poland (2004)
- Spain (2005–2009)
- Portugal (2006)
- Philippines (2007–2009)
- Indonesia (2008-)
- Chile (2008)
- Australia
- China (2008-2010)
- Belgium / Flanders
- Luxembourg
- Switzerland (2008-)
- (North Macedonia) Macedonia
- Brazil
- (France) La Réunion, the show is both in Créole and French, depending on the origins of the characters.
- Colombia (2008-)
- Vietnam (2010-2011)
- Turkey (2009-2010)
- Cambodia (2012)
- Romania (2015-)

The length of an episode varies on the locale. In Quebec, where the shorter format is less prevalent than in France, episodes are 30 minutes long, commercials included (inversely, the Quebec show Un gars, une fille, originally half an hour long, was reduced to 9 minutes in its French version). Italy kept the 7 minute format and Spain chose a four - to six-minute format.

== See also ==
=== General ===
- List of French television series
- List of Quebec television series
- List of Quebec television series imports and exports
- Culture of France

=== Similar works ===
- The Office
- Le Bureau
- La Job
