= Christophe Boutin =

French political scientist (born 1959)

Christophe Boutin (born 28 October 1959) is a French political scientist. Doctor of political sciences and public law, he is a professor at the University of Caen, after having been on the staff of the University of Burgundy.

== Biography ==
Christophe Boutin holds a Doctorate in political science, was awarded the Prix Montesquieu in 1991, and is a professor of public law at the University of Caen Normandy, having previously been a lecturer in law at the University of Burgundy (Dijon).

In 2018, he helped create the Fondation du Pont-Neuf.

== Publications ==
- Politique et tradition. Julius Evola dans le siècle (1898–1974), Paris, Éditions Kimé, 1992.
- With Frédéric Rouvillois, Quinquennat ou septennat ?, Paris, Flammarion, 2000.
- (ed.) with Frédéric Rouvillois, L'abstention électorale, apaisement ou épuisement, lecture, 29–30 November 2001, Organised by CENTRE (Centre d'études normand sur la théorie et la régulation de l'État), Paris, F.-X. de Guibert, 2002.
- (ed) with Frédéric Rouvillois, Décentraliser en France. Idéologies, histoire et prospective, CENTRE lecture, 28 and 29 November 2002, Caen, Paris, F.-X. de Guibert, 2003.
- (ed.) with Frédéric Rouvillois, Partis politiques et démocratie. Inséparables mais incompatibles, CENTRE lecture, November 2004, Caen, Paris, F.-X. de Guibert, 2005.
- Gens de mer au travail, work coordinated by Christophe Boutin, Jean-Louis Lenhof, Élisabeth Ridel, published by Pôle Maritime, introduction by André Zysberg, Caen, Maison de la recherche en sciences humaines de Caen, 2007.
