= Yann Collette =

French actor

- Born: 14 April 1956 (age 70); Cannes, France
- Occupation: Actor
- Years active: 1979-present

Yann Collette (born 14 April 1956) is a French actor. He appeared in more than sixty films since 1979.

== Selected filmography ==
Film
Year	Title	Role	Notes
1989	Bunker Palace Hôtel	Orsini	
1991	J'entends plus la guitare	Martin	
1992	The Supper		
1997	On Guard	Peyrolles	
2003	Shimkent hôtel		
2004	Immortal		
2008	Dante 01		

TV
Year	Title	Role	Notes
2008	Skirt Day		
2020	Inhuman Resources	Alain Kaminsky	
