= Shimkent hôtel =

2003 film

- Theatrical poster
- Directed by: Charles de Meaux
- Written by: Charles de Meaux
- Produced by: Gil Donaldson; Xavier Douroux; Franck Gautherot; Helen Olive; Carol Polakoff
- Edited by: Guillaume Le Du
- Music by: Charles de Meaux; Vladimir Karoev; Pierre Mikaïloff
- Production companies: Anna Sanders Films; Donaldson Polakoff Productions
- Distributed by: Bodega Films
- Release date: 23 April 2003
- Running time: 90 minutes
- Countries: France; United Kingdom
- Languages: French; Russian; Tajik
- Budget: $400.000
- Box office: $19.000

Shimkent hôtel is a 2003 French fictional film directed and written by Charles de Meaux who co-wrote music score with Vladimir Karoev and Pierre Mikaïloff. It tells the story of a young man who failed a business venture in the Afghan mountains and is suffering from shock in Kazakhstan.

== Cast ==
- Romain Duris as Romain
- Caroline Ducey as Caroline
- Melvil Poupaud as Alex
- Thibault de Montalembert as Le Docteur de Montalembert
- Yann Collette as The consul
