= Ludmila Ruoso =

French dub actor

- Occupations: Actress; voice actress
- Website: ludmilaruoso.wixsite.com/ludmilaruoso

Ludmilla Ruoso is a French actress who is active in dubbing.

== Filmography ==
=== Films ===
Year	Title	Role	Ref.
2001	Quand tu descendras du ciel	Marthe	
2004	Burnt Out	Anna	
2007	L'Histoire de Richard O.	Richard's girlfriend	
2007	The Grocer's Son	Sophie	
2007	Mon fils à moi	Policewoman	
2008	The Other One	Girl	
2008	Rodeo		
2011	Possessions	Sabrina	

=== TV series ===
Year	Title	Role
2004	Julie Lescaut	Secretary associate
2004	Alex Santana, négociateur	Leila
2006	Mademoiselle Joubert	Young lady
2006	Turbulences	Marilou
2008	Hard	Voisine Sophie
2010	R.I.S, police scientifique	Sylvie Walkowitz
2010	Un flic	Prison director
2011	Research unit	Marie's mother
2012	Famille d'accueil	Caroline Davy

=== Television films ===
Year	Title	Role
2004	Je serai toujours près de toi	Secretary agent
2009	La Marquise des ombres	Wife

== Dubbing ==
=== Films ===
==== Feature films ====
Year	Title	Role	Actress	Ref.
2003	Frida	Cristina Kahlo	Mía Maestro	
2003	The Motorcycle Diaries	Chichina Ferreyra	Mía Maestro	
2003	Duplex	Céline	Amber Valletta	
2003	Confessions of a Dangerous Mind	Young lady	Krista Allen	
2004	Bridget Jones: The Edge of Reason	Rebecca	Jacinda Barrett	
2005	Brokeback Mountain	Lureen Newsome Twist	Anne Hathaway	
2005	Cursed	Joanie	Judy Greer	
2005	Animal	Justine Keller	Emma Griffiths Malin	
2005	Where the Truth Lies	Bonnie Trout	Sonja Bennett	
2006	The Namesake	Maxine Ratliff	Jacinda Barrett	
2006	Skinwalkers	Sonja	Natassia Malthe	
2007	Halloween	Deborah Myers	Sheri Moon Zombie	
2007	Planet Terror	Dr Dakota Block	Marley Shelton	
2007	Death Proof	Dr Dakota Block	Marley Shelton	
2007	The Mist	Steff Drayton	Kelly Collins Lintz	
2007	Offside			
2007	Lust, Caution	Ma Tai Tai	Yan Su	
2008	The Reader	Marthe	Karoline Herfurth	
2008	Quarantine	Kathy	Marin Hinkle	
2009	Halloween II	Deborah Myers	Sheri Moon Zombie	
2009	The Boat That Rocked	Desiree	Gemma Arterton	
2009	The Front Line	Loredana Biancamano	Lucia Mascino	
2009	Adrift	Ângela	Camilla Belle	
2009	Tetro	Silvana	Silvia Pérez	
2010	Fair Game	Valerie Plame	Naomi Watts	
2010	Tamara Drewe	Poppy Hardiment	Lola Frears	
2010	Leap Year	Bride	Dominique McElligott	
2011	The Twilight Saga: Breaking Dawn – Part 1	Carmen Denali	Mía Maestro	
2011	The Deep Blue Sea	Liz Jackson	Sarah Kants	
2011	Oslo, August 31st	Mirjam	Kjærsti Odden Skjeldal	
2011	Shame	Elizabeth	Elizabeth Masucci	
2012	The Twilight Saga: Breaking Dawn – Part 2	Carmen Denali	Mía Maestro	
2013	Diana	Diana Spencer	Naomi Watts	
2013	Her	Sexy Kitten	Kristen Wiig	
2014	The Babadook	Claire	Hayley McElhinney	
2015	Freeheld	Carol Andree	Mary Birdsong	
2015	Ex Machina	Jade	Gana Bayarsaikhan	
2016	A Conspiracy of Faith	Rakel	Amanda Collin	
2017	The Man with the Iron Heart	Lina Heydrich	Rosamund Pike	

==== Animated feature films ====
Year	Title	Role
2009	Yona Yona Penguin	Chaley's mother
2015	The Boy and the Beast	Mother

=== Television ===
==== Television films ====
Year	Title	Role	Actress
2012	La Certosa di Parma	Cecchina	Barbara Ronchi
2014	Doktor Proktors prompepulver	Lise's mother	Marian Saastad Ottesen
2016	Infidelity in Suburbia	Mira	Miranda Frigon
2016	Hidden Truth	Jamie	Sarah Lind

==== Television series ====
Year	Title	Role	Actress
2003	American Dreams	Amy Fielding	Kristen Bell
2006	Dexter	Laura Moser	Sage Kirkpatrick
2011	CSI: Miami	Samantha Owens	Taylor Cole
2013	The Originals	Sofya	Taylor Cole
2017	Taboo	Zilpha Geary	Oona Chaplin
