= Def2shoot =

Motion picture and advertising visual effects company

Def2shoot A vendre
- Industry: Visual Effects, CGI animation
- Founded: 2002
- Headquarters: Paris, France
- Number of employees: 78
- Website: Def2shoot.com

Def2shoot is a motion picture and advertising visual effects company, founded in 2002 and established in Paris, France. The firm has gained popularity in the French visual effects and CGI industry.

On June 28, 2007, it was placed in receivership. On April 18, 2008, it was the subject of a disposal plan and was delisted on September 24, 2015.

In 2008 the assets were taken over by Hiventy le Hub.

== Filmography ==
- Paris (Cédric Klapisch, 2008)
- L'Ennemi intime (Florent Emilio Siri, 2007)
- La Môme (Olivier Dahan, 2007)
- Incontrôlable (Raffy Shart, 2006)
- OSS 117: Cairo, Nest of Spies (Michel Hazanavicius, 2006)
- Un ticket pour l'espace (Eric Lartigau, 2006)
- The Russian Dolls (Cédric Klapisch, 2005)
- L'Empire des loups (Chris Nahon, 2005)
- Les 11 commandements (Michaël Youn, 2004)
- Saint Ange (Pascal Laugier, 2003)
- Monsieur N (Antoine de Caunes, 2003)

== Animation ==
- Yona Yona Penguin (Rintaro, 2009)
- Peur(s) du Noir (2007)
- Gullia (2006–2007)
- Gecko (2006)
- LightFields (2006)
- Bravo Gudule (2004–2006)

== Advertising ==
- Belvedere (2007)
- Pods (2007)
- Perrier (2006)
- Palmolive (2006)
- Smirnoff (2006)
- Kia (2006)
- Halifax (2006)
- Air France (2006)
- Molson (2006)
- Sony-Ericsson (2005)
- PlayStation (2005)

== External links and sources ==
- Official Def2shoot website
