= Nicolas Cazalé =

French actor (born 1977)

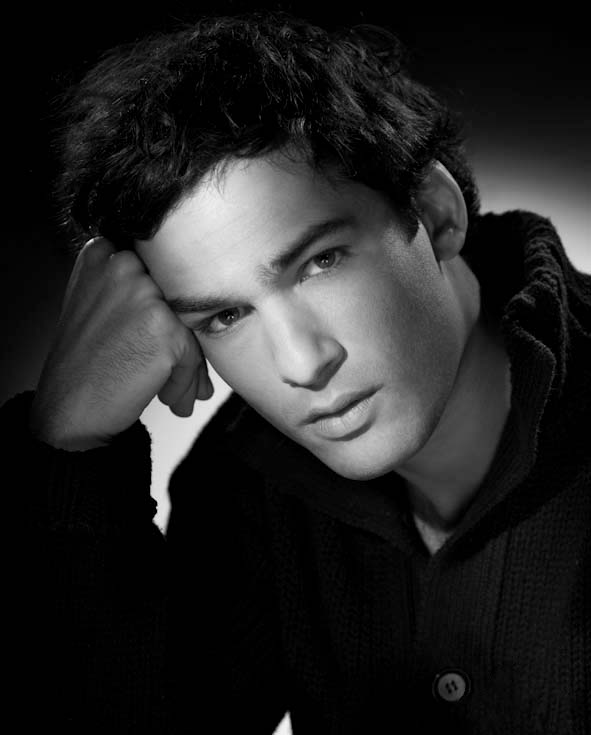
- Nicolas Cazalé in 2008
- Born: Nicolas Cazalé; 24 April 1977 (age 48); Pau, Gascony, France

Nicolas Cazalé (born 24 April 1977 in Pau, Gascony, France) is a French model and actor who is most noted for his role in the 2004 French film, Le Grand Voyage for which he won a Jury Award for Best Actor at the 2005 Newport International Film Festival. He was also named one of European cinema's up-and-coming talents and won the Shooting Stars Award in 2008.

== Career ==
Cazalé was born in Pau to a father from Béarn and an Algerian mother. He first decided to become an actor at age 18 after he attended a play. He then briefly enrolled in Cours Florent drama school, but later dropped out to travel around the world. He was then cast in a small role in the French television show, Louis Page and worked in television and in small film roles for several years. He was cast as Reda, a French-Moroccan teenager, in the 2004 film Le grand voyage. The role garnered him a Jury Award for Best Actor at the Newport International Film Festival. He also appeared in the French film The Grocer's Son for which he received a nomination for the 2008 César Award for Most Promising Actor. His other noted performances include his role as the love interest of actress Manuela Vellés in Julio Medem's Chaotic Ana and a supporting role in director Régis Wargnier's 2007 film Have Mercy on Us All. Cazalé also plays Jewish boxer Victor Perez in director Steve Suissa's upcoming biopic. In 2011 he starred in the Charles de Meaux film Stretch and served on the jury at the Fantastic'Arts film festival.

== Personal life ==
Cazalé's mother is Algerian. He was baptized as a Roman Catholic. Cazalé speaks limited Arabic and fluent Spanish.

== Filmography ==
- Bella ciao - 2001
- Under Another Sky (Les Chemins de l'oued) - 2002
- L'Amour dangereux - 2003
- 3 Dancing Slaves (Le Clan) - 2004
- The Great Journey (Le grand voyage) - 2004
- Saint-Jacques... La Mecque - 2005
- Have Mercy on Us All (Pars vite et reviens tard) - 2007
- UV - 2007
- The Grocer's Son (Le Fils de l'épicier) - 2007
- Chaotic Ana (Caótica Ana) - 2007
- Mensch - 2009
- Conte de la Frustration - 2010
- Stretch - 2011
- Working Girls (Filles de joie) - 2020
- Overdose - 2022

== Television roles ==
- La prise en passant (2011)
- Robinson Crusoë (2003)
- Louis Page (2000)
