= Yona Yona Penguin =

2009 film directed by Rintaro

- Theatrical release poster.
- Directed by: Rintaro
- Written by: Tomoko Konparu
- Produced by: Jungo Maruta; Denis Friedman; Tony S. Izumi
- Cinematography: Tomoko Konparu
- Edited by: Alexandra Pocquet
- Music by: Toshiyuki Honda
- Production companies: Madhouse; Dynamo Pictures; Def2shoot; Storm Lion; Denis Friedman Productions
- Distributed by: Shochiku
- Release date: December 23, 2009 (Japan)
- Running time: 85 minutes
- Countries: France; Japan
- Languages: English; French; Japanese
- Budget: $12,000,000
- Box office: $12,000,000

Yona Yona Penguin (よなよなペンギン) is a 2009 animated fantasy adventure film produced by the Japanese anime studio Madhouse and sister company Dynamo Pictures. An international co-production of Japan and France, it was Madhouse's first fully 3D CGI film. Rintaro, known for Galaxy Express 999 and Metropolis, directed the project, while French production company Denis Friedman Productions collaborated and helped fund the film.

== Plot ==
An animated adventure about a young girl named Coco who is fascinated with penguins, and wears a penguin costume often. One fateful day, after being taunted by bullies saying penguins couldn't fly, she attempts to fly anyway, as she claims her now deceased father has flown with other penguins in the past, and ends up falling. She then comes across a golden feathered wing, and a penguin shaped capsule, containing parts for a toy robot cat, who comes to life and lures Coco to a hidden store full of penguin merchandise. The robotic cat transforms into his real form, a goblin named Chaley. He believes her to be the chosen "flightless bird" who would save his world from peril, and so they travel to a fantasy land where other goblins live. Coco's grandfather follows her in silence to see what was going on. The villagers tell Coco about an evil entity named Buccaboo, and his devil henchmen, and about how he has gotten more powerful than ever, slowly destroying the goblins' village. Buccaboo's lead henchman, Zammie, comes to the village to taunt the goblins even more. Coco, who calls him a bully, thinks this was all a mistake, since she is a human and not a bird. They offer to take her back home, but she gets suspicious about Zammie's true identity, Coco and Chaley set out to investigate about Buccaboo's true motives. They find out Zammie is actually a fallen, one winged angel, who fell from heaven, and Buccaboo has been using him and his heavenly powers to become more powerful, making him act evil in the process. Coco and Chaley help Zammie escape from Buccaboo's lair, and they try to get Zammie's missing wing so that he can return to heaven, before Buccaboo finds out and destroys the village completely. Coco has to really fly to recover the wing, through memories of her father, she is able to summon him from heaven, who lifts her and grants her the ability to really fly. She also gets the help of her grandfather and gods who are represented in Coco's home world in a statue. Buccaboo is defeated as Zammie recovers his second wing and goes back to heaven. Coco is finally able to go back home only to find her grandpa added to the statue. The Penguin Store disappears and Chaley goes back to his robotic toy cat form.

== Cast ==
- Féodor Atkine
- Rica Matsumoto
- Jeanne Savary
- Yves Barsacq
- Ludmila Ruoso
- Ei Morisako
- Michel Elias
- Céline Ronté
- Pierre Baton
- Serge Biavan
- Mehani Taric
- Cédric Dumond
- Clara Quilichini
- Yuji Tanaka
- Yoshio Kojima
- Jérémy Prévost
- Hiroshi
- Paolo Domingo
- Gilles Morvan
- Adrian Solis
- Dandy Sakano
- Satoshi Kanada
- Leah Friedman
- Caroline Combes
- Akiyoshi Kawashima
- Audrey Sablé
- Bernard Bouillon
- Hikari Ôta
- Abraham Taïeb

== Production ==
Madhouse has announced this film as being a "3D anime", or a film which brings an anime sensibility and design structure into the 3D CGI world. Unlike in other Japanese CG productions, such as Final Fantasy VII Advent Children, photo-realism is not emphasised. Rather, attention has been focused on giving the feel of a traditionally-made anime to a completely computerized production. As Madhouse's expertise has long been in the creation of traditional 2D animation, much of the actual 3D animation was done by the French animation studio Def2shoot, the Thai studio Imagimax, and the Japanese studio Dynamo Pictures, with Madhouse providing direction and storyboards.

== Release ==
In a move away from the typical anime release schedule, distribution deals for showing the film outside Japan have been signed with the Hong Kong–based Golden Network (for Asia) and the French-based management company Wild Bunch (for Europe). Rights to release the film in the United States are currently set to be given by Japanese studio Shochiku and Madhouse's U.S. division. Three versions of the film are to be produced: one for the Japanese market, one for the French market, and one for the English language market. The Japanese version of the film, which will use the original script (it is unclear if changes will be made to the other versions) was originally scheduled for a December 2008 release, but was pushed back to 2009. The other versions remain tentatively set for release in 2009. At the 2008 European Film Market (a film trade fair held in tandem with the Berlin International Film Festival), the film was licensed by Wild Bunch for 11 European markets. The film was distributed in the United Kingdom by Metropolitan, in France by JBK, in Russia and other former Soviet countries by Central Partnership and in South Korea by Next Entertainment World (NEW). Maiden Japan released the film on Blu-Ray in the U.S. with both English and Japanese tracks.

== See also ==
- List of animated feature films
- List of computer-animated films
