= Éric Guirado =

French film director and writer (born 1968)

- Born: 16 September 1968 (age 56); Lyon, Rhône, France
- Occupation(s): film director, screenwriter
- Years active: 1994 – present

Éric Guirado (born 16 September 1968) is a French film director and writer born in Lyon, Rhône.

== Career ==
Éric Guirado started his career as a journalist and his interest in social issues is apparent in the documentary-style of his story-telling. After producing for regional television in France, he directed his first feature film From Heaven (Quand Tu Descendras Du Ciel) in 2003. His most successful film in his home country has been The Grocer's Son (Le Fils de L'Épicier), a dramatic film set in Provence, France. The film was presented as part of the 2007 Namur Francophone Film Festival.

== Filmography ==
Year	Title	Role	Notes
1994	Lonelytude ou une légère éclaircie	Director & Writer	Short
1995	Oui	Assistant Director	Short
1997	Les beaux jours	Director & Writer	Short
1999	Un petit air de fête	Director & Writer	Short; Brest European Short Film Festival - French Grand Prix; Cannes Film Festival - Kodak Short Film Award; César Award for Best Short Film; Clermont-Ferrand International Short Film Festival - Special Mention of the Jury; Uppsala International Short Film Festival - Third Prize of the Jury
2000	Étoffe	Director & Writer	Short
2000	& frères	Director & Writer	Short
2000	De marbre	Director & Writer	Short
2000	Super boulette	Director & Writer	Short
2000	Je suis un super héros	Director & Writer	Short; Brest European Short Film Festival - Audience Award
2003	Quand tu descendras du ciel	Director & Writer	
2007	The Grocer's Son	Director & Writer	
2007	Comoedia, une renaissance	Director	Documentary
2009	Le début de l'hiver	Director & Writer	Short; Nominated - Warsaw International Film Festival - Best Short
2010	Mémoires d'une jeune fille dérangée	Producer	Short
2011	Possessions	Director & Writer	
2012	Bye Bye maman	Producer	Short
2013	Quand j'etais petit, je serai acteur	Director & Writer	Documentary
2016	Je te tiens, tu me tiens	Director & Writer	Short
