= American Cuisine (film) =

Cuisine américaine
- Directed by: Jean-Yves Pitoun
- Written by: Jean-Yves Pitoun
- Produced by: Michael Johnson
- Starring: Jason Lee; Eddy Mitchell; Irène Jacob; Isabelle Petit-Jacques
- Cinematography: Jean-Marie Dreujou
- Edited by: Monica Coleman
- Music by: René-Marc Bini
- Production companies: Universal Pictures; M6 Films; Alva Films
- Distributed by: PolyGram Film Distribution
- Release date: 21 October 1998
- Running time: 92 minutes
- Country: France
- Languages: French; English
- Budget: $6.6 million
- Box office: $1.9 million

American Cuisine (Cuisine américaine) is a 1998 French film directed by Jean-Yves Pitoun and starring Jason Lee, Eddy Mitchell, Irène Jacob, and Isabelle Petit-Jacques. It was released in the United States in 2001.

== Premise ==
After a conflict with an officer, Loren Collins got fired from the US Navy, where he was learning to be a chef. Too poor to pay for cooking studies, he went to Dijon and got hired by Louis Boyer, the bad tempered owner of a prestigious restaurant.

== Cast ==
- Jason Lee : Loren Collins
- Eddy Mitchell : Louis Boyer
- Irène Jacob : Gabrielle Boyer
- Isabelle Petit-Jacques : Carole
- Sylvie Loeillet : Suzanne
- Thibault de Montalembert : Vincent
- Anthony Valentine : Wellington
- Isabelle Leprince : Agnès
- Laurent Gendron : Bruno
- Gérard Chaillou : Roger
- Lyes Salem : Karim
- Linda Powell : Miller
- Skipp Sudduth : Wicks
- David Gabison : Fredet
- Keith Hill : Germaine
