= Gérard Chaillou =

French actor (1946–2025)

- Born: 11 January 1946; Rennes, France
- Died: 2 August 2025 (aged 79); Villejuif, France
- Occupation: Actor
- Years active: 1973–2025

Gérard Chaillou (French: [ʒeʁaʁ ʃaju]; 11 January 1946 – 2 August 2025) was a French actor.

== Life and career ==
Born in Juziers on 11 January 1946, Chaillou started his career in the theatre. He was a member of the Comédie-Française from 1983 to 1985. He also appeared in notable films such as The Conquest, which covered the political rise of President Nicolas Sarkozy. His final appearance was in 2024 with Que notre joie demeure, directed by Cheyenne Carron. His most notable television appearance was as Jean-Guy Lacointre on Caméra Café, broadcast on M6.

Chaillou died on 2 August 2025, at the age of 79.

== Filmography ==
=== Cinema ===
- George Who? (1973)
- Solemn Communion (1977)
- Un étrange voyage (1981)
- Diva (1981)
- Élisa (1995)
- American Cuisine (1998)
- Irene (2002)
- Michel Vaillant (2003)
- Arsène Lupin (2004)
- L'Antidote (2005)
- By the Pricking of My Thumbs (2005)
- Behind the Walls (2008)
- The Extraordinary Adventures of Adèle Blanc-Sec (2010)
- The Conquest (2011)
- The Mark of the Angels – Miserere (2013)
- An Officer and a Spy (2019)
- Super-héros malgré lui (2021)
- The Edge of the Blade (2023)

=== Television ===
- Les Cinq Dernières Minutes (1975)
- H (1998)
- Julie Lescaut (1999)
- Josephine, Guardian Angel (2001)
- Caméra Café (2001–2004)
- The Poisoner (2006)
- Le Grand Charles (2006)
- Scènes de ménages (2018–2025)
