= Stretch (2011 film) =

- French theatrical release poster
- Directed by: Charles de Meaux
- Screenplay by: Charles de Meaux
- Produced by: Charles de Meaux; Charles Gillibert; Nathanaël Karmitz; Xavier Douroux; David Wenzel
- Starring: Nicolas Cazalé; Fan Bingbing; David Carradine
- Distributed by: mk2 films
- Release date: 12 January 2011
- Running time: 90 minutes
- Country: France
- Language: English

Stretch is a 2011 English-language French sports film directed by Charles de Meaux and starring Nicolas Cazalé, Fan Bingbing and David Carradine. It marks Carradine's last screen appearance, as he died during filming in Bangkok. After his death, his widow Annie Bierman sued MK2 Productions, the film's production company, for negligence.

== Synopsis ==
After failing a drug test in France, young jockey Christophe moves to Macau, where he becomes involved in the city's fast-paced racing world. However, his luck seems to be running out when his trainer asks him to lose a race. With the help of beautiful Pamsy, he must find a way to avoid antagonizing the Chinese mafia.

== Cast ==
- Nicolas Cazalé as Christophe
- Fan Bingbing as Pamsy
- David Carradine as Monteiro
- Nicolas Duvauchelle as Thierry
- John Aryananda as Big John
- Lowell Lo as Way Way
- Christophe Pieux as Jockey #1
- Romain Banquet as Jockey #2
- Yannick Foin as Athletic Trainer #1
- Joël Remy as Athletic Trainer #2
- Cédric Ségeon as Cédric
- Patrick Teoh (a.k.a. Mr. Teohlogy) as The Man
- Pete Teo as Mr. Thong
- David Firestar as Nightclub dancer #1
- Peter Mossman as Nightclub dancer #2

== Production ==
De Meaux used his experiences as a former jockey while making the film. For his role as a jockey Cazalé was forced to lose a large amount of weight. Stretch was shot in France at the Longchamp Racecourse and the Maisons-Laffitte Racecourse. Other scenes were filmed in Bangkok, Thailand and Macao. In Bangkok, three days before shooting wrapped David Carradine was found dead in his hotel, apparently from accidental asphyxiation. After Carradine's death, his widow Annie Bierman sued MK2 Productions, the film's production company, for negligence and wrongful death. Meaux rewrote the script and reduced his screen time to around three minutes although the characters frequently talk about Carradine's character and David is heard off camera. The film's release was delayed due to Bierman's lawsuit.

== See also ==
- List of films about horses
- List of films about horse racing
