= Benso =

Benso is a surname. Notable people with the surname include:

- Camillo Benso, conte di Cavour (1810–1861), leading figure in the movement toward Italian unification
- Giulio Benso (1592–1668), Genovese painter of the early Baroque

== See also ==
- Benso Oil Palm Plantation, Ghanaian oil palm plantation and company, based at the Adum Banso Estate in Takoradi
- Benson (surname)
