= Frédéric Rouvillois =

French academic and author (born 1964)

- Born: 19 August 1964 (age 61); Paris, France
- Occupations: Academic; Author

Frédéric Rouvillois (born 1964) is a French academic and author. He is a Professor of Public Law at Paris Descartes University and the author of more than 30 books.

== Works ==
- Histoire du snobisme. Paris: Flammarion. 2008. ISBN 9782081205420. OCLC 470823575.
- Dictionnaire nostalgique de la politesse. Paris: Flammarion. 2016. ISBN 9782081360754. OCLC 967285779.
