= Louis des Balbes de Berton de Crillon =

French soldier (c. 1541–1615)

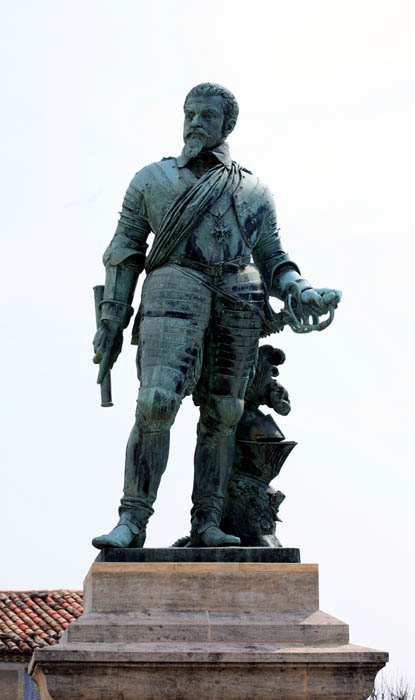
Statue of Louis at Crillon-le-Brave

Louis des Balbes de Berton de Crillon (French pronunciation: [lwi de balb də bɛʁtɔ̃ də kʁijɔ̃]; c. 1541, Murs, Provence – 2 December 1615, Avignon) was a French soldier, called the Man without Fear and, by Henry IV the Brave of the Brave.

Louis was born in France from a branch of the Balbo Bertone family of Chieri which had relocated one generation prior from Italy to Southern France.

Trained in Avignon and later under Guise of Lorraine, Crillon became an officer in 1557 and distinguished himself in the siege of Calais and the capture of Guînes through his courage. He suppressed the conspiracy of Amboise in 1560 and fought against the Huguenots and excelled at Dreux, St. Denis, Jarnac and Moncontour.

After the peace of St. Germain (1570), he fought as a Maltese under John of Austria against the Turks and participated in the battle of Lepanto. Openly condemning the St. Bartholomew's Day massacre, he fought at the Siege of La Rochelle (1572-1573). Henry III, whom he accompanied to Poland, named him governor of Lyon.

In the war with the League, he forced La Fère to surrender and was made captain of a regiment of the guard, member of the royal council and general lieutenant of the infantry and took Provence in 1586. He spoke out against Henry III's plan to assassinate the Duke of Guise. Later, he was the only support of the weak Henry III and became a friend and counsel of Henry IV under whom he took part in the battle of Ivry and the siege of Paris. In his war against Spain, he again excelled and commanded an army in Savoy. After the peace, he retired to Avignon, where he died.

The place Crillon in Avignon and the village Crillon in the Vaucluse département of Provence were named Crillon-le-Brave in his honour.
