= Camille de Casabianca =

French filmmaker and writer

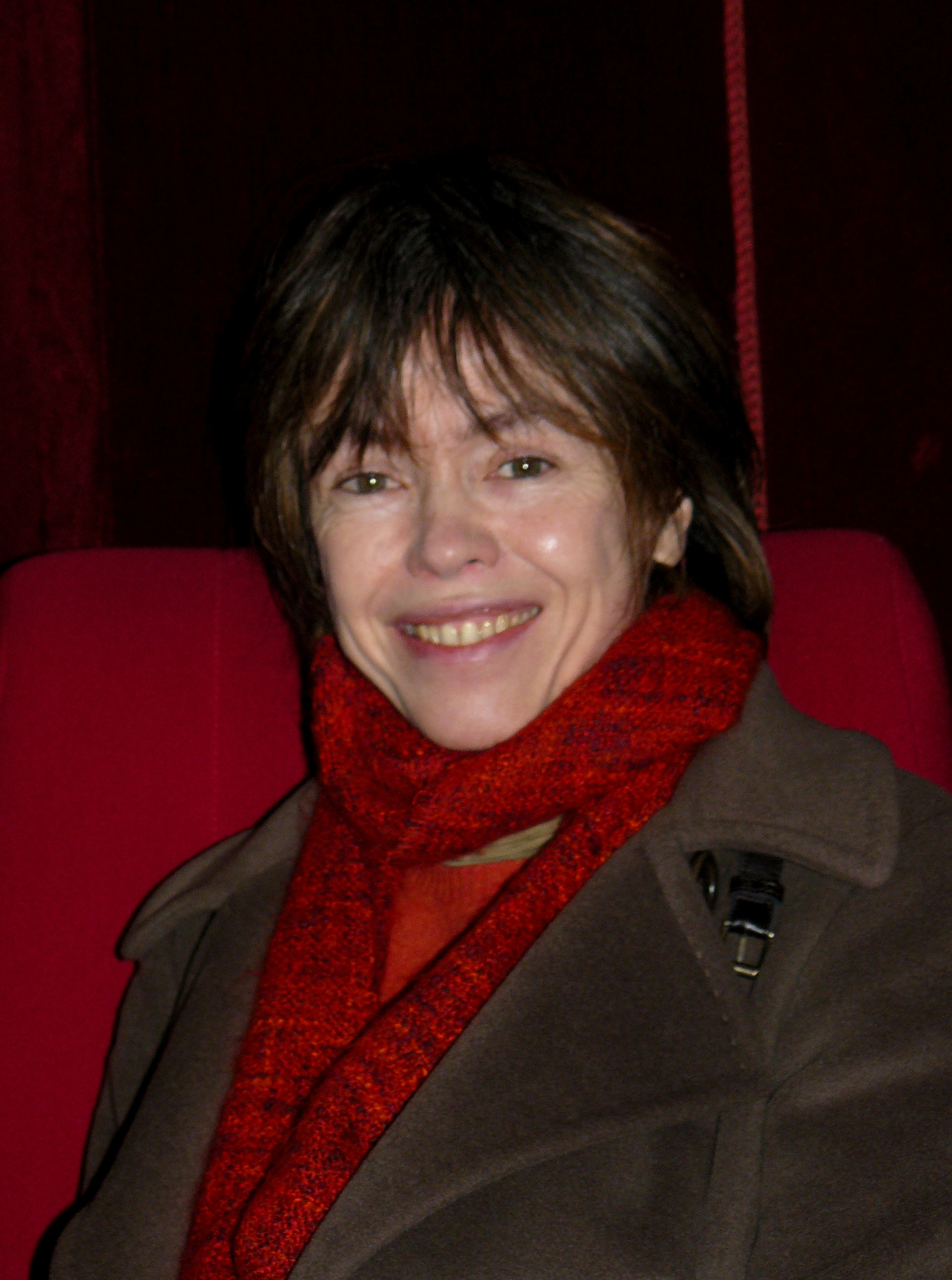
Camille de Casabianca in 2010

Camille de Casabianca (born 31 October 1960) is a French filmmaker and writer.

== Biography ==
Camille de Casabianca was born 31 October 1960, in Paris. She received a Master of Arts degree in political science from University of California, Berkeley.

Casabianca's selected films include Peking Central, a comedy set in Mainland China, Madame Petlet's True Story, a French comedy, and Vive Nous!, a romantic comedy about social class and judo. Her film Let's Party was released in 2010 in France and selected by various festivals throughout the world (Nyon International Film Festival, Ronda International Film Festival, Buenos Aires 2011 FICIP). Her film Family Harmony (2013) features Georges Kiejman, known as lawyer and former Minister of the French government. In September 2019, Ca marche !? was released in France. This documentary penetrates the world of En Marche, the political movement created in 2016 which brought to power French President Emmanuel Macron and 315 Parliament members.

In 2022, Departure Time, L'Heure du départ, her eleventh feature, is released in Europe. It generates many debates on the end of life subject.

Casabianca's published work includes Le Lapin Enchanté (Le Seuil, 2005) and Gourou (Leo Scheer, 2011).

== Films ==
- 1981 – Un étrange voyage
- 1986 – Peking Central (Pékin Central)
- 1988 – After the Rain (Après la pluie)
- 1990 – The Fruit of Thy Womb (Le Fruit de vos entrailles)
- 1990 – Octavio
- 1995 – Madame Petlet's True Story (Le Fabuleux destin de Madame Petlet)
- 2000 – Long Live Us! (Vive nous !)
- 2003 – Tatami
- 2007 - A Day in the Life of Kate Perry, Unemployed Actress (short feature)
- 2010 – Let's Party (C'est parti)
- 2013 – Family Harmony (L'Harmonie familiale)
- 2019 – Once upon a time in France (Ça marche !?)
- 2022 – Departure Time (L'Heure du départ)

== Awards ==
She received a 1996 21st Century Filmmaker Award in New York and was awarded Best Original Screenplay or Adaptation in 1987 at the 12th César Awards.
