= Crillon-le-Brave =

Crillon-le-Brave Crilhon (Occitan)
- Commune
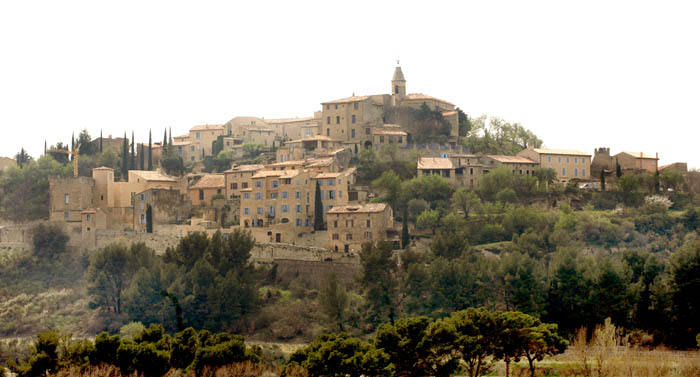
- A view of the village of Crillon-le-Brave

- Coat of arms
- Location of Crillon-le-Brave
- Location within France Location within Provence-Alpes-Côte d'Azur
- Coordinates: 44°07′05″N 5°08′39″E
- Country: France
- Region: Provence-Alpes-Côte d'Azur
- Department: Vaucluse
- Arrondissement: Carpentras
- Canton: Pernes-les-Fontaines
- Intercommunality: CA Ventoux-Comtat Venaissin

Government
  - Mayor (2020–2026): Guy Girard
- Area^{1}: 7.63 km^{2} (2.95 sq mi)
- Elevation: 395 m (1,296 ft)
- Highest elevation: 443 m (1,453 ft)
- Lowest elevation: 208 m (682 ft)
- Population (2023): 488
  - Density: 64.0/km^{2} (166/sq mi)
- Demonym: Crillionais
- Time zone: UTC+01:00 (CET)
  - Summer (DST): UTC+02:00 (CEST)
- INSEE/Postal code: 84041 /84410
- Website: www.crillonlebrave.fr
- ^{1} French Land Register data, which excludes lakes, ponds, glaciers > 1 km^{2} (0.386 sq mi or 247 acres) and river estuaries.

Crillon-le-Brave (French pronunciation: [kʁijɔ̃ l(ə) bʁav]; lit. 'Crillon-the-Brave'; Occitan: Crilhon) or simply Crillon is a commune in the Vaucluse department in the Provence-Alpes-Côte d'Azur region of Southeastern France. As of 2023, the population of the commune was 488.

Like many of the older villages in the region, it was built on a hilltop for defensive purposes and to provide more farmland on the plains below. It is a small town, with only one paved road running through the middle. It contains little more than a café, a bakery, a hotel, a restaurant, a church, as well as a school.

== Geography ==
Crillon-le-Brave is situated 12 km (7.5 mi) from Carpentras, 35 km (22 mi) from Avignon and about 2 km (1.2 mi) from Bédoin. It lies close to the Mont Ventoux, at the south foot.

== History ==
=== Prehistory and antiquity ===
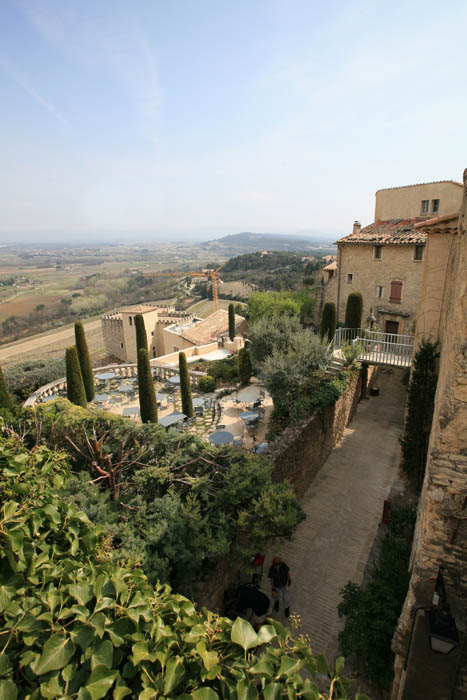
Crillon-le-Brave

Excavations have shown that the village was occupied since the Neolithic period. Researchers collected scrapers and piercers in the Espelettes district, and lithic tools at the Camas and Sous-les-Roques sites. Vestiges also attest that the place was inhabited in Roman times. Amphoras, potteries and dolia were exhumed from quarries as well as an altar to Jupiter and a Cippus. On the site of Auberte, potter's oven were discovered dated to the third century.

In Roman times, the town went by the name Crillonium, and later Crillon, but one could say that its modern history begins in the 14th century when a leading Avignon family acquired the feudal rights to the village. A long line of dukes ruled Crillon throughout the period leading up to the French Revolution.

The village takes its full name of Crillon-le-Brave from the most legendary of its dukes: Louis des Balbes de Berton de Crillon or "Le Brave Crillon" (1541–1615) was one of Henri IV's fiercest and most valiant generals during the French Wars of Religion in the late 16th century. The same Crillon family also gave its name to the famous Hôtel de Crillon in Paris.

Like most of the buildings surrounding the church at the top of the village, the houses that form the core of the Hostellerie have their origins in the 16th and 17th centuries and played an important part in village life. The Maison Roche was originally the presbytère – the priest's home, and at the same time the village school.

At the end of the 19th century Crillon-le-Brave was a prosperous village of 800 inhabitants served by several cafés, bars and stores. There was even a local philharmonic society. By the beginning of the 20th century, however, the village began a long slow decline. Two wars and a failing water supply left the village almost abandoned and many of its houses fell into ruins. But since the early 1970s new inhabitants have brought new life to the old stones, so that today Crillon-le-Brave has once again become a lively village.

== See also ==
- Communes of the Vaucluse department
- List of places named after people
