= Charles de Meaux =

French film director and contemporary artist

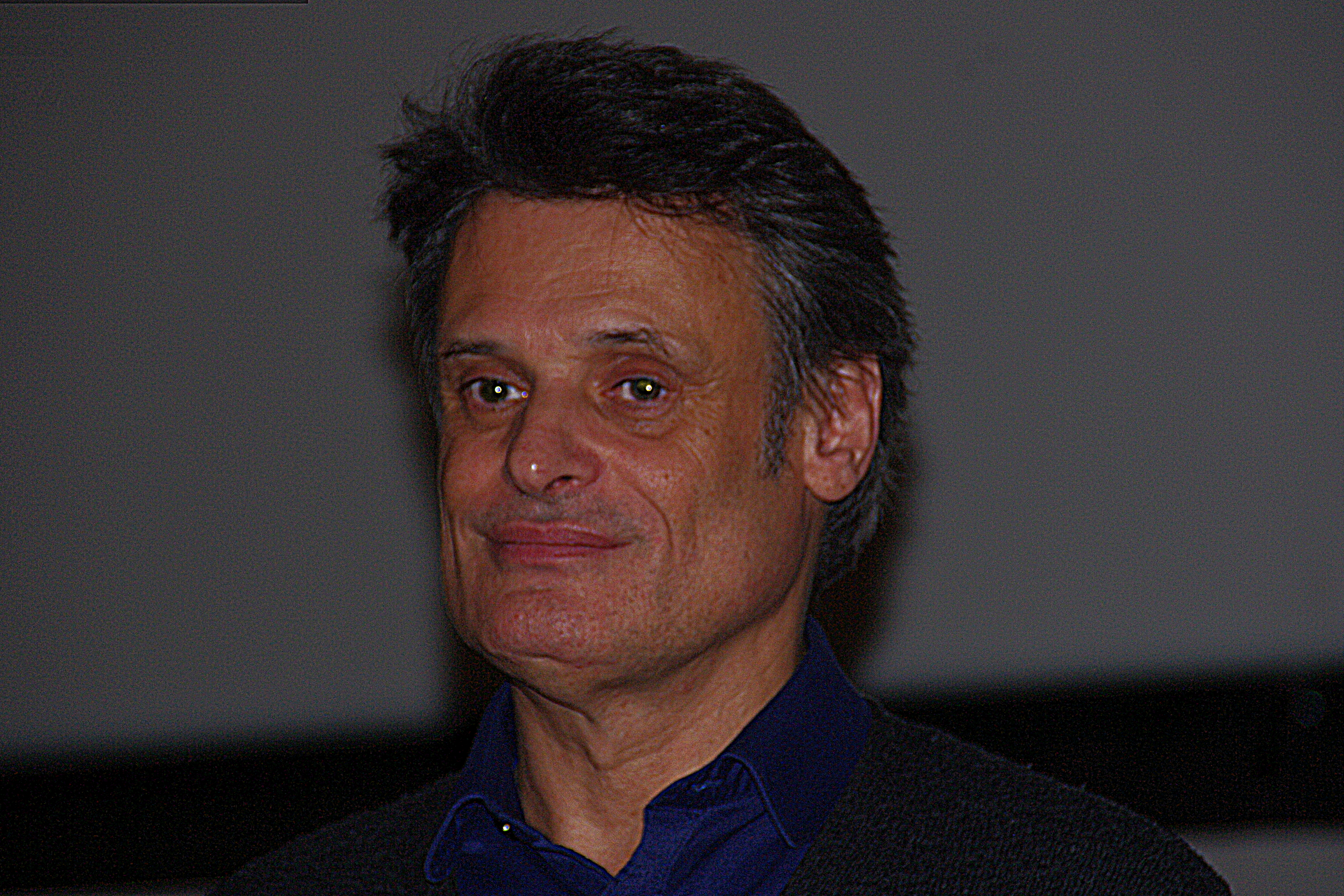
- Born: 1967 (age 57–58)
- Occupations: Film director; contemporary artist
- Website: charlesdemeaux.com

Charles de Meaux (born 1967) is a French film director and contemporary artist. His work combines fine arts and cinema.

== Biography ==
In 1997 in order to produce his first film, Le pont du Trieur (co-written with Philippe Parreno), he founded the production company Anna Sanders Films, with Philippe Parreno, Pierre Huyghe, Xavier Douroux and Franck Gautherot (both from the Consortium de Dijon), and then Dominique Gonzales-Foerster.

de Meaux's 's film works make extensive use of narration to explore the relation between reality and fiction – particularly science fiction. Landscapes also play an important role in his work.

de Meaux shows his films principally in museums and art institutions:

- Le Pont du trieur, was shown in 2001 at the Centre Pompidou in the context of the Prospective Cinéma program.
- Alien intelligence is coming from Earth (2002) has been permanently exhibited outside the walls of the New Media Museum of Busan in South Korea since 2007 as a video installation consisting of a very large screen installed in water.
- You should be the next Astronaut (2004), was presented by the New York institution, Creativetime and projected on a giant screen in Times Square in 2006.
- Shimkent Hotel (2003), Death of Glory (2006) and You should be the next Astronaut, all three included in the piece titled Warning to the spectator, were shown at the Solomon R. Guggenheim Museum in New York in 2009.
- Shin-ji-ke was presented in 2012 at the International Exposition in Yeosu, South Korea. It is a particularly innovative sound and video installation, on a screen measuring 200m x 40m.
- Ghost train, sound and visual installation at Centre national d'art et de culture Georges-Pompidou, Paris.

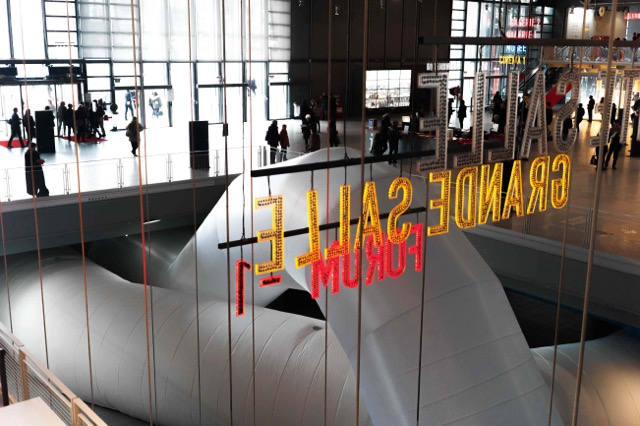
Ghost Train

de Meaux has co-produced all of the films of the Thai independent film director Apichatpong Weerasethakul, notably Tropical Malady (Prix du jury at the Festival de Cannes in 2004), Oncle Boonmee, who can recall his past lives (Palme d'Or at the Festival de Cannes in 2010) and "Cemetery of Splendour".

== Installations ==
- Stanwix, 2000
- Alien intelligence is coming from Earth, 2002
- You should be the next Astronaut, 2004
- Death or Glory, 2006
- Marfa Mystery lights, 2006
- Garish sun, 2008

== Full length films ==
- Le Pont du Trieur, 2000
- Shimkent Hotel, 2003
- Stretch, 2010

== Main art collection ==
- CNAP, France
- MoMA, New York
- New Media Museum, Busan
