= Paris Police 1910 =

French crime drama television series

- Genre: Crime drama Drama; Action fiction
- Created by: Frédéric Balekdjian; Fabien Nury
- Starring: Marc Barbé; Jérémie Laheurte; Evelyne Brochu
- Country of origin: France
- Original language: French
- No. of series: 1
- No. of episodes: 6

Production
- Running time: 52 minutes

Original release
- Network: Canal+
- Release: April 27 – May 25, 2026

Related
- Paris Police 1900; Paris Police 1905

Paris Police 1910 is a French crime drama television series created by Fabien Nury that was first broadcast on 27 April 2026 on Canal+ in France.

== Reception ==
The show was widely praised by critics.

== See also ==
- Paris Police 1900
- Paris Police 1905
