= Death of Stalin (disambiguation) =

Joseph Stalin, the second leader of the Soviet Union, died on 5 March 1953.

Death of Stalin may also refer to:

- La Mort de Staline (English: The Death of Stalin), a two-volume French graphic novel published in 2010 and 2012 by Thierry Robin and Fabien Nury
- The Death of Stalin, a 2017 film by Armando Iannucci, based on the graphic novel
