= Jérémie Laheurte =

French actor

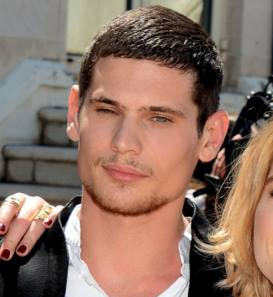
- Laheurte at the Cannes Film Festival in 2013
- Born: September 7, 1990 (age 35); Paris, France
- Occupations: Actor; model
- Years active: 2012–present
- Known for: Blue Is the Warmest Colour; Paris Police 1900; Notre-Dame on Fire
- Partner: Adèle Exarchopoulos (2012–2016)

Jérémie Laheurte (born 7 September 1990) is a French actor and former model.

He gained initial recognition for his role as Thomas in the Palme d'Or-winning film Blue Is the Warmest Colour (2013). He later achieved wider fame for his starring role as Inspector Antoine Jouin in the historical crime series Paris Police 1900 (2021) and its sequel Paris Police 1905 (2022).

== Early life and modeling ==
Laheurte was born in Paris. Before establishing himself as an actor, he worked extensively as a model for fashion campaigns, including brands such as Yves Saint Laurent. He eventually transitioned to acting, citing a desire to explore more emotional and physical depth in his work.

== Career ==
=== 2012–2019: Breakthrough and independent cinema ===
Laheurte made his television debut in 2012 in the Arte television film Punk, directed by Jean-Stéphane Sauvaire, playing a young, rebellious punk named Vincent.

In 2013, he garnered significant attention for his role in Abdellatif Kechiche's coming-of-age drama Blue Is the Warmest Colour (La Vie d'Adèle). He played Thomas, the high school boyfriend of the protagonist Adèle (played by Adèle Exarchopoulos). The film was a critical success, winning the Palme d'Or at the 2013 Cannes Film Festival.

Following this breakthrough, Laheurte focused on arthouse cinema. He appeared in The Stopover (Voir du pays, 2016), a drama about French soldiers returning from Afghanistan dealing with PTSD, and played a supporting role in the biographical war film A Private War (2018), portraying French photojournalist Rémi Ochlik. In 2019, he starred as the male lead in You Deserve a Love (Tu mérites un amour), the directorial debut of actress Hafsia Herzi, which premiered at International Critics' Week at Cannes.

=== 2020–present: Paris Police and mainstream success ===
In 2021, Laheurte secured his most prominent role to date as the lead in the Canal+ original series Paris Police 1900, created by Fabien Nury. He portrayed Antoine Jouin, an idealistic young police inspector investigating crimes in Belle Époque Paris. The series was praised for its gritty, "visceral" tone, and was broadcast internationally, including on the BBC in the UK. For the role, Laheurte underwent significant physical preparation, performed his own stunts, and grew a moustache that he kept for eight months to stay in character. He reprised the role in the sequel season, Paris Police 1905, released in 2022.

Simultaneously, he appeared in major film productions, such as Jean-Jacques Annaud's disaster film Notre-Dame on Fire (Notre-Dame brûle, 2022), where he played Chief Warrant Officer Joël of the Paris Fire Brigade.

In 2024, he starred in the action film GTMAX directed by Olivier Schneider and the drama Le Beau rôle. In 2025, he appeared in the music video for "Tant pis pour elle" by Canadian singer Charlotte Cardin. He is set to portray the Georgian revolutionary Kote Tsintsadze in the upcoming biopic The Young Stalin (Le Jeune Staline), directed by Gela Babluani, scheduled for 2026.

== Personal life ==
Laheurte was in a relationship with his Blue Is the Warmest Colour co-star Adèle Exarchopoulos from 2012 to 2016.

== Filmography ==
=== Film ===
Year	Title	Original title	Role	Notes
2013	Blue Is the Warmest Colour	La Vie d'Adèle : Chapitres 1 et 2	Thomas	
2015	Summer of All My Parents	Juillet Août	Romain	
2016	The Stopover	Voir du pays	Ness	
2018	A Private War	—	Rémi Ochlik	
2019	You Deserve a Love	Tu mérites un amour	Rémi	
2022	Notre-Dame on Fire	Notre-Dame brûle	Chief Warrant Officer Joël	
2022	Driving Madeleine	Une belle course	Ray (young)	
2022	Blazing Neon	Du crépitement sous les néons	Yann	
2023	Like a Prince	Comme un prince	Jérôme	
2024	Guardians of the Formula	L'Affaire Vinča Curie	Schwarzenberg	
2024	GTMAX	—	Théo	
2026	The Young Stalin	Le Jeune Staline	Kote Tsintsadze	Post-production

=== Television ===
Year	Title	Role	Notes
2012	Punk	Vincent	Television film
2018	Maroni	Stéphane	Main role; 4 episodes
2021	Paris Police 1900	Inspector Antoine Jouin	Main role; 8 episodes
2022	Paris Police 1905	Inspector Antoine Jouin	Main role; 6 episodes
2022	La Cour	Joël	Television film

=== Music videos ===
Year	Title	Artist	Director
2018	"Mon Paris"	Yves Saint Laurent	Ricky Saiz
2025	"Tant pis pour elle"	Charlotte Cardin	Jason Brando
