= Fabien Nury =

French comic book writer

Fabien Nury (born 31 May 1976) is a French comic book writer.

== Published works ==
=== In English ===
- The Death of Stalin, Titan Comics, 2017.
- Death To The Tsar, Titan Comics, 2018.
- Tyler Cross: Black Rock, Titan Comics, 2018.
- Tyler Cross: Angola, Titan Comics, 2019.
- Once Upon a Time in France, Dead Reckoning, 2019.
- Atar Gull, Titan Comics, 2019.
- I Am Legion, Humanoids Inc, 2024.

=== In French ===
Charlotte impératrice

- 1 La Princesse et l’Archiduc, Dargaud, August 2018.
- 2 L'Empire, Dargaud, June 2020.
- 3 Adios, Carlotta, Dargaud, May 2023.
- 4. Soixante ans de solitude, Dargaud, Paris, 18 April 2025.

Les Chroniques de Légion

- 1 Livre I, Glénat, May 2011. (ISBN 978-2-7234-7623-2)
- 2 Livre II, Glénat, October 2011. (ISBN 978-2-7234-7749-9)
- 3 Livre III, Glénat, May 2012. (ISBN 978-2-7234-7928-8)
- 4 Livre IV, Glénat, May 2012. (ISBN 978-2-7234-8252-3)

Il était une fois en France

- 1 L'Empire de Monsieur Joseph, Glénat, September 2007. (ISBN 978-2-7234-5580-0)
- 2 Le Vol noir des corbeaux, Glénat, September 2008. (ISBN 978-2-7234-6183-2)
- 3 Honneur et Police, Glénat, October 2009. (ISBN 978-2-7234-6873-2)
- 4 Aux armes, citoyens !, Glénat, October 2010. (ISBN 978-2-7234-7716-1)
- 5 Le Petit Juge de Melun, Glénat, October 2011. (ISBN 978-2-7234-8358-2)
- 6 La Terre promise, Glénat, October 2012. (ISBN 978-2-7234-8499-2)

Je suis légion

- 1 Le Faune dansant, Les Humanoïdes Associés, June 2004. (ISBN 2-7316-6302-2)
- 2 Vlad, Les Humanoïdes Associés, January 2006. (ISBN 2-7316-1661-X)
- 3 Les Trois Singes, Les Humanoïdes Associés, November 2007. (ISBN 978-2-7316-1662-0)

Katanga

- 1 Diamants, Dargaud, Mars 2017. (ISBN 978-2-205-07455-0)
- 2 Diplomatie, Dargaud, November 2017. (ISBN 978-2-205-07687-5)
- 3 Dispersion, Dargaud, January 2019. (ISBN 978-2-205-07794-0)

Le Maître de Benson Gate

- 1 Adieu Calder, Dargaud, April 2007. (ISBN 978-2-205-05682-2)
- 2 Huit petits fantômes, Dargaud, August 2008. (ISBN 978-2-205-06015-7)
- 3 Le Sang noir, Dargaud, January 2011. (ISBN 978-2-205-06435-3)
- 4 Quintana Roo, Dargaud, November 2011. (ISBN 978-2-205-06436-0)

La mort de Staline

- 1 Agonie, Dargaud, 2010
- 2 Funérailles, Dargaud, 2012

== Filmography ==
†	Denotes productions that have not yet been released

=== Film ===
Year	Title	Writer	Creator	Notes
2017	The Death of Stalin	Yes	Yes	

=== Television ===
Year	Title	Creator	Writer	Director	Notes
2012	Les brigades du Tigre		Yes		
2012	Pour toi, j'ai tué		Yes		
2016-2017	Guyane	Yes	Yes	No	
2021	Paris Police 1900	Yes	Yes	Yes	Directed episode: "#1.8"
2022	Paris Police 1905	Yes	Yes	No	
2026	Paris Police 1910	Yes	Yes	No	
