= Demimonde =

French term used in English

Demimonde, French for "half-world", is a 19th-century term to describe women on the fringes of respectable society, particularly courtesans supported by wealthy lovers. The term originally derives from an 1855 play called Le Demi-Monde by Alexandre Dumas fils, which depicted how prostitution challenged the institution of marriage.

== History ==
Historically, the height of the demimonde was encapsulated by the period known in France as La Belle Époque (1871–1914), from the end of the Franco-Prussian War to the beginning of World War I. The twentieth century brought the rise of the New Woman, changing economies and social structures, as well as changing fashions and social mores, particularly in the aftermath of World War I. Prostitution and the keeping of mistresses did not disappear, but the label demimondaine became obsolete as the 'half-world' changed.

== Demimondaine ==
Demimondaine became a synonym for a courtesan or a prostitute who moved in these circles—or for a woman of social standing with the power to thumb her nose at convention and throw herself into the hedonistic nightlife. A woman who made that choice could find her social status lost, as she became "déclassée".

Marguerite Steinheil, from the Japy family, a powerful dynasty of French industrialists, married minor Academic art painter Adolphe Steinheil in 1890. She acted as her husband's model for some time, but aspired to a more intense and moneyed existence, and opened a salon in their villa at 6 bis, Impasse Ronsin, close to Montparnasse, which was soon frequented by all of Paris. Combining ambition and temperament, her status as the archetypal demimondaine rose as she conducted affairs with some of the most influential and generous men in the country. Marguerite, always concerned about her husband's career, obtained artistic commissions for him from her protectors, which helped Adolphe accept his marital misfortunes.

Marguerite's affair with the President of the Republic, Félix Faure, won Adolphe an official commission for a monumental painting representing The Presentation of Decorations by the President of the Republic to the Survivors of the Disaster of the Fort de la Redoute Ruinée (August 8, 1897), which was exhibited at the Salon des artistes of 1898. Adolphe was also awarded the Legion of Honor cross the same year. Félix Faure is alleged to have suddenly died from a stroke whilst receiving sexual favours from Marguerite at the Élysée Palace. This part of her life has been fictionalised in the TV series Paris Police 1900.

=== Les Trois Grâces ===
During the Belle Époque, three courtesans dominated Parisian social life and became collectively known as Les Trois Grâces (The Three Graces): La Belle Otero, Liane de Pougy and Émilienne d'Alençon. Their rivalry was legendary among the Tout-Paris: according to chronicler André de Fouquières, on one occasion Otero appeared at the theatre wearing a bolero encrusted with diamonds to outshine Pougy, who, forewarned of the plan, arrived with her arms, neck and shoulders completely bare, followed by her maid carrying all her jewels on a tray. All three amassed considerable fortunes through their relationships with royalty, aristocrats and financiers across Europe, but ultimately faced financial ruin: Otero squandered an estimated $25 million of the era in the casinos of Monte Carlo and Nice, while Émilienne d'Alençon was forced to sell her possessions at the Hôtel Drouot in 1931.

== Fictional demimondaines ==
Possibly the most famous portrayal of the demimonde, albeit from before the word was coined, is in Giuseppe Verdi's opera La traviata (1853). The opera, in turn, was inspired by Alexandre Dumas fils's La Dame aux Camélias; Marguerite Gautier, the heroine of the book and subsequent play, was based on Marie Duplessis, 1840s Paris courtesan and mistress to a number of prominent men, including Dumas. She would famously be portrayed on stage by Sarah Bernhardt.

In writing his 1924 play Easy Virtue, Noël Coward stated his object was to present a comedy in the structure of a tragedy "to compare the déclassée woman of to-day with the more flamboyant demi-mondaine of the 1890s."

In The Seven-Per-Cent Solution (1976), the character Lola Devereaux is labeled a demimondaine by the character Sigmund Freud.

In Goodbye to Berlin, the character Sally Bowles is described as a demimondaine.

== See also ==
- Ukiyo

== Sources ==
- William Makepeace Thackeray (1848), Vanity Fair.
- Colette (1945), Gigi.
- William Blatchford (editor) (1983), The Memoirs of Cora Pearl: The Erotic Reminiscences of a Flamboyant 19th Century Courtesan. London; New York: Granada. ISBN 0-246-11915-2.
- Katie Hickman (2003), Courtesans : Money, Sex and Fame in the Nineteenth Century . New York: Morrow. ISBN 0-06-620955-2.
- Joanna Richardson (1967), The Courtesans: The Demi-monde in 19th Century France. London: Weidenfeld & Nicolson.
