= Adrian McLoughlin =

British stage, television and film actor (born 1947)

Adrian McLoughlin (born 1947, London) is a British stage, television and film actor who began his career in 1983. He is best known for his 2017 role as Joseph Stalin in the Armando Iannucci film The Death of Stalin.

He has worked many times with Alan Ayckbourn at the Stephen Joseph Theatre in Scarborough, beginning with the part of Reg in a revival of The Norman Conquests. He has also worked with him at the Royal National Theatre in House & Garden and on tour throughout the UK in several of his plays. In addition, he has appeared at the Orange Tree Theatre in Ayckbourn’s Private Fears in Public Places which then went on to feature in the Brits Off Broadway Festival in New York in 2005. In 2009 he also appeared in Taking Steps written and directed by Alan Ayckbourn, again at the Orange Tree Theatre, Richmond.

In 2014 he appeared at the Arcola Theatre in a production of The Rivals directed by Selina Cadell.

McLoughlin has set up his own theatre company Vital Signs Productions, which concentrates on producing plays featuring older people. He is also co-owner and director of the drama based training company Role Plays for Training Ltd.

== Selected filmography ==
Year	Title	Role	Notes
2002	Thunderpants	Bob Rodgers	
2017	The Death of Stalin	Joseph Stalin	
2020	Terry	Terry	Short Film
2021	Alice, Through the Looking	PC dum/Justice Dum	
