= Alice, Through the Looking =

2021 political satirical comedy film

- Film poster
- Directed by: Adam Donen
- Written by: Adam Donen; Lewis Carroll
- Based on: Based on, inspired by Alice's Adventures in Wonderland and Through the Looking-Glass, Lewis Carroll
- Produced by: Adam Donen; Daniel S Reynolds
- Starring: Saskia Axten; Elijah Rowen; Vanessa Redgrave; Steven Berkoff; Carol Cleveland
- Cinematography: Jason Elis
- Edited by: David Gesslbauer
- Music by: Adam Donen; Robert Harder
- Production companies: 12th Battalion Productions; Czar Germany
- Distributed by: Czar Germany, world sales; The Roku Channel; Relay
- Release dates: 2021 (POFF Film Festival); 2026 (Roku TV)
- Running time: 90 minutes
- Countries: United Kingdom; Germany
- Language: English

Alice, Through the Looking (full title Alice, Through the Looking: À La Recherche d'Un Lapin Perdu) is a 2021 British German political satirical dark comedy film directed by Adam Donen, inspired by the 1865 novel Alice's Adventures in Wonderland and 1871 novel Through the Looking-Glass by Lewis Carroll The film is produced by 12th Battalion productions and Czar Germany. It stars Saskia Axten, Vanessa Redgrave, Sophie Vavasseur, Steven Berkoff, Elijah Rowen, Slavoj Žižek and Carol Cleveland.

A satirical retelling of Carroll's Alice stories, the film focuses on a student's bizarre journey across an alternate Brexit era London, and is told through a self referential non linear narrative, often with digressions. It has been described in early reviews as "an audacious mix of literary adaptation, experimental essay film, political polemic and surreal comedy."

== Premise ==
The film follows Alice (Saskia Axten) a young student who stumbles into a bizarre version of London after her night with a newfound lover, Rabbit (Elijah Rowen) appears to suddenly have never happened. The night in question just happens to be the evening of the UK's 2016 referendum on EU membership.

The film itself periodically shifts to different layers of narrative, from the Alice in Wonderland adapting narrative of Alice's search for Rabbit in an upside-down version of London, to a satirical "real world" scenario, showing philosophers and the "director" (played by director Adam Donen) reacting to the film they are planning.

== Festival appearances and release ==
The film had its World Premiere on 25 November at the 2021 PÖFF Film Festival, Tallinn, Estonia as part of the First Features strand. It subsequently was featured in the 2022 International Fuse Festival lineup. Further in 2022, after a UK premiere at London Rocks Festival, the film featured at Liverpool Film Festival, and North East International Film Festival in October and November respectively. In November 2022, it was screened at South Africa Independent film Festival. In March 2023, it was screened at the Idyllwild International Festival Of Cinema in California.

In November 2026, the film was commercially released via Roku Film/TV via the Relay app.

== Awards ==
Award/Film Festival	Date of ceremony	Category	Recipients	Result	References
POFF film Festival Estonia	2021	First Feature	Adam Donen	Nominated	
North East international Film Festival	2022	Best Director Feature film	Adam Donen	Won	
London Rocks Film Festival	2022	Best Performer	Saskia Axten	Won	
South African Independent Film Festival	2022	Best feature	Adam Donen	Won	
Idyllwild International Festival Of Cinema	2023	Best Feature film, Best International film, Best Director, Best Screenwriter, Best Cinematography, Best Actress, Best Ensemble Cast	Adam Donen, Jason Elis, Saskia Axten, Steven Berkoff, Carol Cleveland, Alan Ford, Vanessa Redgrave, Elijah Rowen, Joerg Stadler, Sophie Vavasseur	Nominated	

== Major cast ==
- Saskia Axten as Alice
- Vanessa Redgrave as the Narrator
- Adam Donen as "Adam"
- Steven Berkoff as "The Executive Producer"
- Slavoj Zizek as himself
- Elijah Rowen as Rabbit
- John Locke as the Old Banker
- Adrian McLoughlin as PC Dum/Justice Dum
- Lewis Allcock as PC Dee/Lord Dee
- Sophie Vavasseur as Emma
- Joerg Stadler as the Caterpillar
- Alan Ford as the Chairman
- Julian M. Deuster as Beethoven
- Adam Ganne as Chopin
- Oengus MacNamara as T.S. Eliot
- John Le Sage as the Colonel
- Patricia Le Sage as the Colonel's Wife
- Andy Dowson as The Wild Man
- Carol Cleveland as the Queen
