= Nathalie Teirlinck =

Belgian film director and screenwriter (born 1985)

- Born: 1985 (age 40–41); Brussels, Belgium
- Education: Royal Academy of Fine Arts of Ghent
- Occupations: Film director, screenwriter
- Years active: 2006–present

Nathalie Teirlinck (Dutch pronunciation: [naːtaːˌli ˈteːrlɪŋk]; born 1985) is a Belgian film director and screenwriter.

In 2007, Teirlinck studied at the film department of the Royal Academy of Fine Arts in Ghent. Her three short films, Anémone (2006), Juliette (2007), and Venus vs. Me (2010), were all well received at international film festivals. Both Anémone and Juliette were awarded Best Short Film at the Flanders International Film Festival Ghent. Anémone was nominated at the Locarno Festival, and Venus vs. Me won the V.A.F. WildCard as well as the European Film Academy Award in the wake of the Berlin Film Festival in 2010.

After this, Teirlinck also directed music videos for Novastar, Lady Linn, Admiral Freebee, Amenra, and other artists. She made her theatrical directing debut with the 2009 production Send All Your Horses, and she went on to direct three more productions: Yesterday (2011), Staring Girl (2012), and Slumberland (2015). The last two were nominated for the Theaterfestival, and Slumberland won the Music Theater Now award in New York City in 2015. Since 2012, Teirlinck has also been a guest instructor at the film department of her alma mater, The Royal Academy of Fine Arts, in Ghent.

Teirlinck's first feature-length film, Le Passé devant nous (international title: Past Imperfect), was released in 2016, with Canadian actress Evelyne Brochu in the lead role. The film was produced by Savage Film—famous for producing such films as Bullhead—and was a co-production between Denmark and the Netherlands. The script won the Eurimages Award at CineMart during the International Film Festival Rotterdam in 2015, and, in September 2017, won two Ensor Awards: the Industry Award and Best Debut. In 2018 Nathalie Teirlinck was awarded the Culture Prize from the City of Ghent.

== Personal life ==
Teirlinck is originally from Brussels, but has been living in Ghent since 2006. In addition to her native Dutch, she also speaks French and English.

== Filmography ==
- 2006: Anémone (short film)
- 2007: Juliette (short film)
- 2010: Venus vs. Me (short film)
- 2016: Le Passé devant nous

== Selected awards and nominations ==
Year	Event	Category	Film	Result
2017	Ensor Award	Best Debut	Le Passé devant nous	Won
2017	Ensor Award	Industry Award	Le Passé devant nous	Won
2010	Berlin Film Festival	Best European Short Film	Venus vs. Me	Won
2007	Film Fest Gent	Best Flemish Student Film	Juliette	Won
2006	Film Fest Gent	Best Flemish Student Film	Anémone	Won
