= Marguerite Steinheil =

French woman famous for her connection to several deaths

The Right Honourable The Lady Abinger
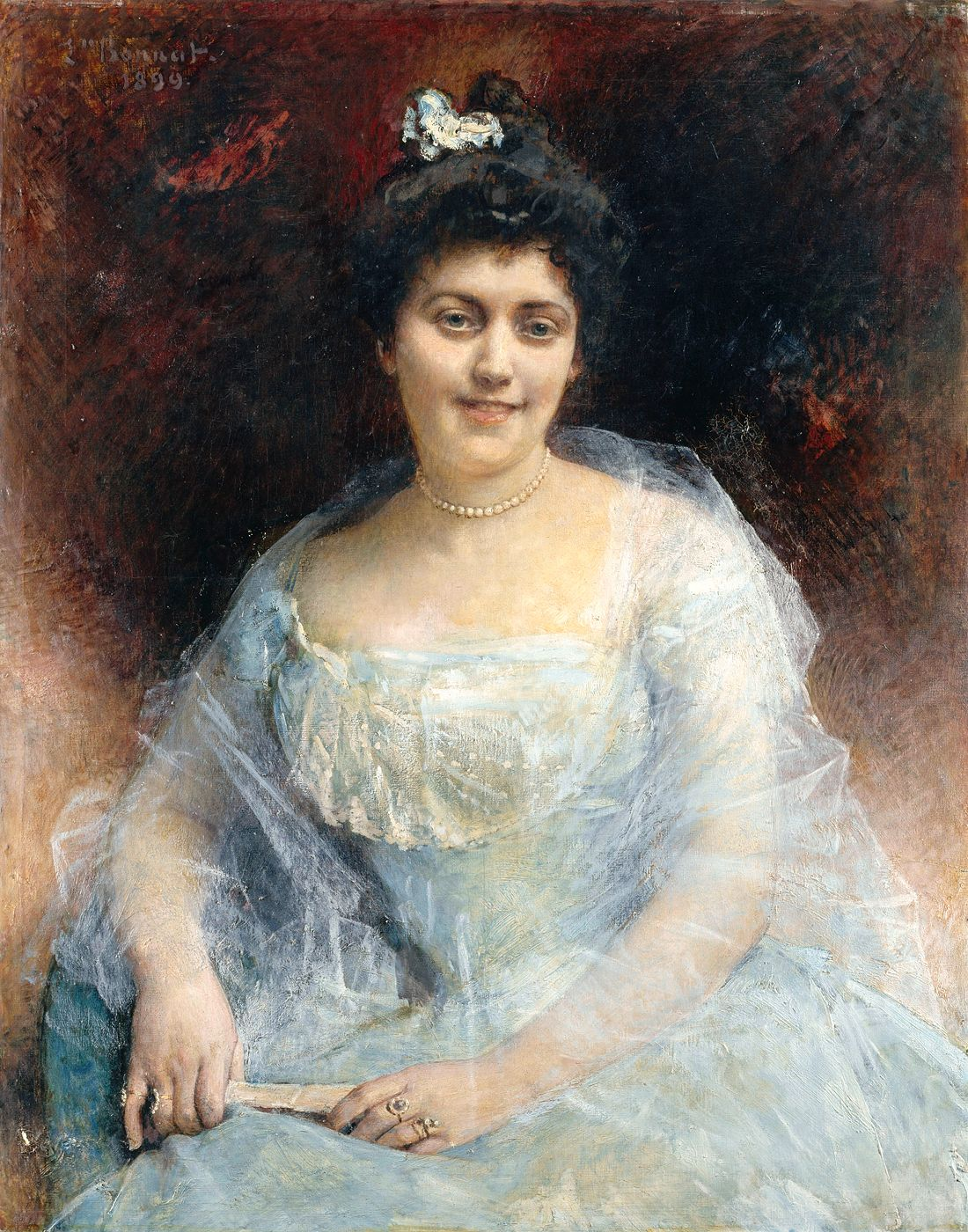
- Born: Marguerite Jeanne Japy; 16 April 1869; Beaucourt, France
- Died: 17 July 1954 (aged 85); Hove, England
- Spouses: Adolphe Steinheil (m. 1890; died 1908) Robert Scarlett (m. 1917; died 1927)
- Children: Marthe Steinheil

Marguerite Jeanne "Meg" Japy Steinheil, Baroness Abinger (16 April 1869 – 17 July 1954) was a French woman known for her many love affairs with important men. She was present at the death of President Félix Faure, who was rumoured to have died after having a seizure while allegedly having sex with her. She was later tried for the murders of her husband and mother, but was acquitted.

== Early life ==
Steinheil was born Marguerite Jeanne Japy in Beaucourt, in the Territoire de Belfort, to a rich, industrial family, the daughter of Émilie (Rau) and Édouard Japy. She married the French painter Adolphe Steinheil, son of painter Louis Charles Auguste Steinheil, in July 1890. They had a daughter Marthe Steinheil born on June 25, 1891. She became a prominent figure in Parisian society, and her salon was frequented by men of eminence in French political and social circles, including Charles Gounod, Ferdinand de Lesseps, René Lalique, Jules Massenet, François Coppée, Émile Zola, and Pierre Loti.

== Mistress of President Félix Faure ==
In 1897, Steinheil was introduced, at Chamonix, to President Félix Faure, who was giving an official contract to Adolphe Steinheil. Because of this, Faure came often to their home on the Impasse Ronsin.

Shortly afterward, Steinheil became Faure's mistress and was regularly ushered into the salon bleu in the private quarters of the presidential Élysée Palace.

On 16 February 1899, Félix Faure called Steinheil by telephone, asking her to come to the palace at the end of the afternoon. Shortly after her arrival, servants were rung for, and they found the president lying on the couch while Steinheil adjusted her disordered clothing. Faure died several hours later.

Unverified legend has it that Steinheil was performing oral sex on him when he suffered a fatal stroke, his convulsed hands tangled in her hair. This was not officially announced, but rumours started spreading immediately, although for several years it was believed that his partner at the time of his death was actress Cécile Sorel.

=== Femme du monde ===
The archetypal demimondaine, after the death of Félix Faure, Steinheil became the mistress of many other famous men.

In her Mémoires, Steinheil records how she and her spouse received a mysterious German guest, who bought back from them each of the pearls of a collar given to her by Faure (le collier présidentiel, as it became known in the press) and who reclaimed a manuscript of the president's memoirs which he had entrusted to Marguerite.

In February 1908, she met the powerful industrialist Maurice Borderel, also from the Ardennes, and soon became his lover.

== L'affaire Steinheil ==
On 31 May 1908, Marguerite's mother and husband were found dead in their residence in the Impasse Ronsin, off the Rue de Vaugirard. Both had died of suffocation by strangulation. Marguerite was found gagged and bound to a bed. She initially said that she had been tied up by four black-robed strangers, three men and a woman. Some newspapers speculated that they had come to her house in search of secret documents which Faure had entrusted to her keeping, possibly relating to the Dreyfus affair.

The police immediately regarded her as a suspect in the killings but had no hard evidence and made a pretence of abandoning the investigation. But Steinheil herself would not let the affair rest. She made an attempt to frame her manservant, Rémy Couillard, by concealing a small pearl which she affirmed had been stolen at the time of the murder in a pocketbook belonging to Couillard; after that fabrication was discovered, she blamed Alexandre Wolff, the son of her old housekeeper, but he was able to establish an alibi. She was arrested in November 1908 and taken to Saint-Lazare Prison.

The crime created a sensation in Paris. It was revealed that she had had a great number of admirers, including even King Sisowath of Cambodia. Opponents of the government tried to make political capital of the affair, the anti-Semitic Libre Parole even charging her with having poisoned President Faure. A sensational trial finally ended in her acquittal on 14 November 1909, although the judge called her stories "tissues of lies".

== Later life ==
After the trial she moved to London, where she was known as Mme de Serignac. She wrote My Memoirs in 1912. On 26 June 1917, she married Robert Scarlett, 6th Baron Abinger, who died in 1927. She lived at 24 Adelaide Crescent in Hove from that year and died in a nursing home in the town on 17 July 1954.

== In popular culture ==
- Steinheil is one of the main characters in the French TV drama, Paris Police 1900, which premiered in 2021 on Canal+ in France and BBC Four in the UK. She is played by Evelyne Brochu.
- The French television film The President's Mistress (La maîtresse du président, 2009) is a dramatized version of their relationship where Steinheil is played by Brazilian actress Cristiana Reali.
- Murder on the Links by Agatha Christie has elements of her case.

== Sources ==
- Alain Decaux : Les assassins, Perrin.
- Armand Lanoux : Madame Steinheil ou la Connaissance du président (1983).
- Christian Siméon, dramaturge : La Priapée des Écrevisses ou l'Affaire Steinheil.
- Pierre Darmon, historien : Marguerite Steinheil, ingénue criminelle? (Perrin, 1996).
- Jacques Neirynck : Le crime du prince de Galles, (2007)
- Middleton, Judy (2002). The Encyclopaedia of Hove & Portslade. Brighton: Brighton & Hove Libraries.
