= Notre-Dame on Fire =

- French theatrical release poster
- French: Notre-Dame brûle
- Directed by: Jean-Jacques Annaud
- Screenplay by: Jean-Jacques Annaud; Thomas Bidegain
- Produced by: Jérôme Seydoux; Ardavan Safaee
- Starring: Samuel Labarthe; Jean-Paul Bordes; Mikaël Chirinian
- Cinematography: Jean-Marie Dreujou
- Edited by: Reynald Bertrand
- Music by: Simon Franglen
- Production companies: Pathé Films; TF1 Films Production; Wildside; Repérage; Vendôme Production
- Distributed by: Pathé Distribution (France); Vision Distribution (Italy)
- Release dates: 16 March 2022 (France); 28 March 2022 (Italy)
- Running time: 110 minutes
- Countries: France; Italy
- Language: French
- Budget: 30,000,000 €
- Box office: $5.9 million

Notre-Dame on Fire (French: Notre-Dame brûle) is a 2022 disaster film based on the Notre-Dame de Paris fire that occurred on 15 April 2019. The film is directed by Jean-Jacques Annaud from a script written by Annaud and Thomas Bidegain. Produced by Pathé Films and TF1 Films Production, it is an international co-production with Italian company Wildside.

Notre-Dame on Fire was released in France on 16 March 2022, by Pathé Distribution in IMAX, Dolby Cinema, and standard formats. In Italy, it was released on 28 March 2022, by Vision Distribution.

== Synopsis ==
On 15 April 2019, a violent fire breaks out in Notre-Dame Cathedral in Paris. Men and women will do everything to save the building and the religious and art treasures stored within.

== Cast ==
- Samuel Labarthe as general Jean-Marie Gontier
- Jean-Paul Bordes as general Gallet
- Mikaël Chirinian as Laurent Prades
- Jérémie Laheurte as chief warrant Joël
- Maximilien Seweryn as sergeant major Reynald
- Dimitri Storoge as captain Francis
- Xavier Maly as monsignor Charley
- Chloé Jouannet as master corporal Marianne
- Pierre Lottin as lieutenant Alexandre
- Jules Sadoughi as sergeant major Jordan
- Vassili Schneider as corporal Sandro
- Ava Baya as sapper Marie-Eve
- Nathan Gruffy as sapper Victor
- Sébastien Lalanne as captain Marcus
- Bernard Gabay as colonel Roland
- Oumar Diolo as Moumet
- Antonythasan Jesuthasan as Jonas
- Élodie Navarre as Chloé's mother
- Chloé Chevallier as Chloé
- Tony Le Bacq as a policeman
- Miguel Facchiano as the motorized policeman
- Pascal Rénéric as Notre-Dame curator
- Anne Hidalgo as herself

== Production ==
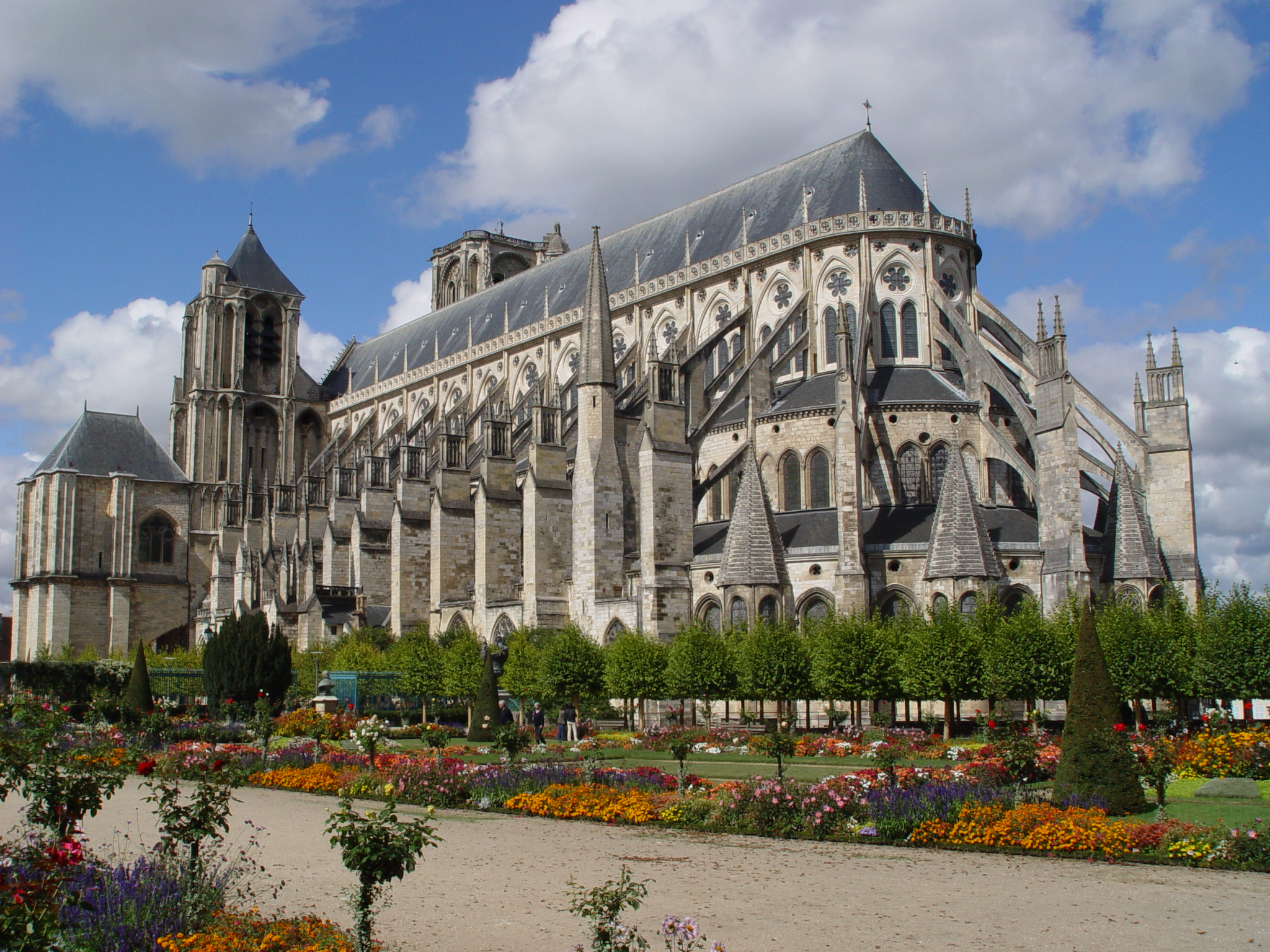
Bourges Cathedral was used as a set for the film.

In April 2020, Jean-Jacques Annaud announced that he wanted to make a film about the fire. He explained this choice later: "Obviously, I immediately felt the extraordinary cinematographic merits. Beyond the disaster and the grief, of course, there is precisely the emotion and the spectacle of the fire". The filmmaker had first thought of making a documentary.

Filming began in March 2021 in Bourges. Bourges Cathedral was used for its resemblance to Notre-Dame. The team then began to shoot in the studio at the Cité du Cinéma. A sequence was then shot in mid-April in Versailles, in the Versailles-Château-Rive-Gauche12 station. Sequences were also shot in Amiens Cathedral, whose spire and certain parts of the building are similar to those of Notre-Dame.

The scenes recounting the start of the fire were set in the 13th-century framework of Saint-Étienne cathedral in Sens. In this place, shots were also taken on the forecourt, on the stairs of the towers, and in the nave.

To complete his film, director Annaud made a public call for actual footage from the day of the fire:

"I still need the traffic jams that were created by this event, the people singing in the night to cheer on the firefighters who saved the cathedral. I also need testimonies from foreign countries (…) to discuss the planetary event. If you have these images, we would be happy to take advantage of them and put them in the film."

== Release ==
In February 2022, it was announced that the film would be released in France on 16 March 2022 by Pathé, three years after the fire. It was then released in Italy on 28 March 2022 by Vision Distribution. It also was released on 22 July 2022 in the United Kingdom by Pathé's British distributor, Warner Bros. Pictures.

== Reception ==
=== Box office ===
On the day of its release in French cinemas, the feature film took 2nd position at the box office ranking of new releases, garnering 41,089 admissions, including 4,771 in preview for 752 copies. In today's releases, it is preceded by the animated film Jujutsu Kaisen 0 and followed by the comedy film Alors on Danse (21,997). The film took 2nd place at the French box office after its first week of release, garnering 388,293 admissions. The film made up part of the top 3 at the box office in the run-up to Printemps du Cinéma 2022. The following week, the film dropped to the 5th place in the French box office with its 108,099 admissions, behind the dramatic comedy film The Kitchen Brigade (119,405) and ahead of the anime Jujutsu Kaisen 0 (78,827). The film maintained this position the following week with an additional 134,038 admissions.

=== Critical reception ===
On the review aggregator website Rotten Tomatoes, 88% of 16 critics' reviews are positive, with an average rating of 6.6/10. Metacritic, which uses a weighted average, assigned the film a score of 64 out of 100, based on 5 critics, indicating "generally favorable" reviews.

=== Accolades ===
Date	Award	Category	Result	Notes
2023	36th Golden Rooster Awards	Best Foreign Language Film	Won	
