= French Girl =

2025 Canadian-American film

- Poster
- Directed by: James A. Woods; Nicolas Wright
- Written by: James A. Woods; Nicolas Wright
- Produced by: Valérie d'Auteuil; André Rouleau
- Starring: Zach Braff; Evelyne Brochu; Vanessa Hudgens
- Cinematography: Jean-François Lord
- Edited by: Yvann Thibaudeau
- Music by: Scott Price
- Production companies: Elevation Pictures; Caramel Films
- Distributed by: Republic Pictures
- Release date: March 19, 2024
- Running time: 106 minutes
- Countries: Canada; United States
- Language: English

French Girl is a 2024 romantic comedy directed by James A. Woods and Nicolas Wright. It stars Zach Braff, Evelyne Brochu and Vanessa Hudgens.

Brooklyn high school teacher Gordon Kinski accompanies his girlfriend, chef Sophie Tremblay, to her hometown Quebec City, to test for a possible position at a Michelin 3-star restaurant run by infamous chef Ruby Collins, where he plans to propose.

The film was released in the United States on February 9, 2024, to mostly negative reviews.

== Plot ==
Gordon Kinski, an eighth-grade English teacher in Brooklyn, plans to propose to his girlfriend, Sophie Tremblay, a talented chef. Sophie is invited to Quebec City for a trial as head chef at a prestigious restaurant owned by her ex-girlfriend, Ruby Collins. Gordon joins Sophie on the trip, as he has just finished school for the summer, so they cancel their upstate New York plans.

Before leaving, Gordon stops by his father Peter's home to collect their heirloom, Titanic, engagement ring for the Canada proposal. Reminding him of his fear of flying, Peter gives him a pill to take to calm his nerves for the flight. The recently creatively blocked romance novelist suddenly gets distracted with an idea, so Gordon has to find his deceased mother's ring.

The nervous Gordon takes the pill Peter gave him on the plane, which was supposed to be Valium. However, he has a strong reaction. So, as they are debarking, they call Peter and discover it was probably a quaalude.

Meeting her family, they are skeptical of Gordon. Several of Sophie's relatives are outside her parents' house to greet them. Gordon, feeling a little awkward, carries the suitcases to the room where they will be staying. Her younger brother Junior approaches him, as he is interested in becoming a police officer so needs to improve his English, which he gladly accepts.

During dinner with Sophie's family, Gordon often says things that annoy them, such as being disinterested in hockey. Then Ruby shows up and monopolizes the conversation, while Gordon constantly puts his foot in his mouth. One of the last things he accidentally does is reveal his agreement to help improve Junior's English for the police exam. This is a point of contention for his father, who wants him to run the sheep farm.

Tensions continue to rise as Gordon learns to navigate their cultural differences. Sophie discovers, on her way to her cooking competition in the car with her father, that the farm is in trouble. If they do not secure a contract soon, they may have to sell it.

Meanwhile, Gordon stays home and, while exploring Sophie's room, finds an album of her with Ruby and discovers they were lovers. He tries to talk to his father about it. However, Peter just suggests proposing to Sophie as quickly as possible, so she does not 'change teams' again.

Sophie has a really grilling day, as Ruby is harsh with all of her potential chefs. Meanwhile, Gordon bonds with Junior as he teaches him English. He also helps her father butcher a lamb, to try to get on his good side. Sophie returns very very late, upon which they get into a big argument, as she withheld the information about her past relationship with Ruby.

After a series of comedic and heartfelt events, including a car accident and a family funeral, Gordon and Sophie reconcile, leading to a proposal accepted with everyone's blessing.

== Cast ==
- Zach Braff as Gordon Kinski
- Evelyne Brochu as Sophie Tremblay
- Vanessa Hudgens as Ruby Collins
- Luc Picard as Alphonse Tremblay
- Antoine Olivier Pilon as Junior Tremblay
- Isabelle Vincent as Ginette Tremblay
- Charlotte Aubin as Juliette Tremblay
- Muriel Dutil as Mammie Tremblay

== Production ==
Produced by Caramel Films, the film was shot in Quebec City and Montreal. Jean-François Lord served as the cinematographer, with music composed by Scott Price. The film's production design was handled by Jean-André Carrière, and costumes were designed by Mariane Carter.

== Release ==
French Girl premiered at the 2024 Santa Barbara International Film Festival.

== Critical response ==
The film received generally negative reviews.

Amy Nicholson wrote in the New York Times: "The filmmakers James A. Woods and Nicolas Wright push their script dangerously close to parody. But there are at least a dozen good zingers in here, particularly a three-part punchline from Ed Weeks as a snobbish food critic that kicks off with, “Have you ever seen an emaciated dolphin?” The trouble is, none of the performances are on the same wavelength: Hudgens is an outrageously hilarious monster; Brochu, an earnest heroine; and the increasingly unhinged Braff tries too hard to be empathetic. The more he wants us to sympathize with his hapless character, the more unforgivable Gordon's actions feel."

In Variety, Lisa Kennedy wrote: "For every inventive or simply satisfying rom-com, there are dozens of clumsy, rote ones — French Girl falls among the latter."

Radheyan Simonpillai in The Globe and Mail wrote: "It just makes me crave a CanCon rom-com where divisive cultural gaps are explored in a way that doesn’t feel so detached from reality, and this country’s history."

On Rotten Tomatoes, it holds an approval rating of 24% based on 25 reviews.

== Awards ==
At the 2024 Mammoth Film Festival, French Girl was nominated for Best Genre Film Feature and Best Actor in a Feature (Zach Braff), and won for "Achievement in Filmmaking – International".
