= La Mort de Staline =

French visual novel

La Mort de Staline (English: The Death of Stalin) is a series of French satirical-biographical graphic novels. The two volumes were created by artist Thierry Robin and writer Fabien Nury, and published in October 2010 and May 2012 by Dargaud.

Walking the line between history and historical fiction, the series traces the events that followed the death of Joseph Stalin, the supreme leader of the Soviet Union, who died in March 1953 and whose death led to a power struggle for the control of the Central Committee between Lavrentiy Beria and future leader Nikita Khrushchev. Most of the story is focused on the rise and fall of Beria, narrating his struggle to hold on to power. The first volume, Agonie, won the Historia Prize in September 2011, and the second, Funérailles, won le Prix Château de Cheverny de la bande dessinée historique in the Rendez-vous de l'histoire festival in 2012.

== Background ==
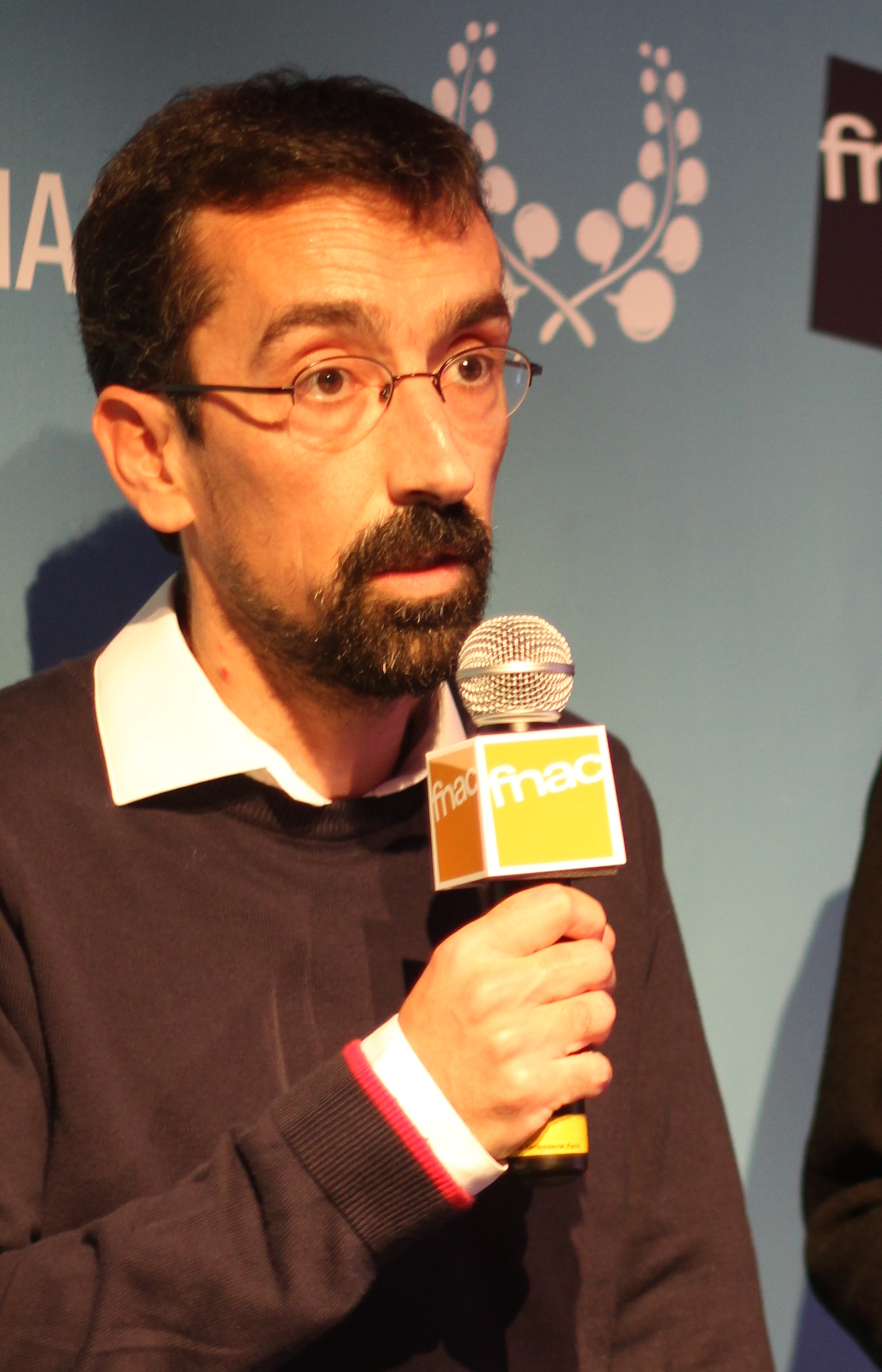
The comic's writer, Fabien Nury, in 2014

Fabien Nury is a French comic book writer, known for historical fiction work such as I Am Legion. Nury inherited books from his grandfather, who was interested in history. While searching for writing material, he discovered several books in his collection about Soviet leader Joseph Stalin, including several covering his death. This inspired Nury to write a John le Carré-style comic about Stalin's death and the ensuing power struggle. During the process, he found that the events surrounding it both horrifying as well as humorous. He decided to write the story to convey this feeling.

=== Historical accuracy ===
Nury stated that "I don't know what really happened, I wasn't there. But I can tell you that from all accounts, from every testimony that I've read, I didn't invent anything." Analysts noted that Nury "softened" some figures in the story for narrative purposes, while others have their negative traits emphasized, such as a focus on Lavrentiy Beria's actions as a serial rapist.

== Plot ==
The story starts in the Soviet Union in 1953. As Radio Moscow oversees a concert, one of the directors receives a call from Joseph Stalin, the General Secretary of the Communist Party, from a secure telephone line, ordering that a recording of the concert be delivered to him. Fearing for their lives, the directors order the in-progress concert to be hurriedly repeated and recorded in order to deliver it to the NKVD, but the pianist, Maria Yudina, stubbornly refuses to play because her family had been sent to the Gulag by Stalin. The directors bribe her with 20,000 rubles, but as the concert ends, she hides a note to Stalin in the sleeve of the record – to the horror of one director – as the NKVD take the record away. Stalin reads the note in his dacha; it says that Yudina prayed that God will forgive him and that she decided to donate the money Stalin gave her to the parish for restoration work. Stalin throws away the note, then suffers a cerebral hemorrhage and becomes paralyzed.

When Stalin is discovered by his maid and a guard, the first to be alerted to Stalin's declining health is Lavrentiy Beria, the head of the Ministry of Internal Affairs. He orders a soldier to take a girl he has raped home, and to then arrest her father. Beria goes to Stalin's dacha while making preparations for the "Glorious Future" of the state. After arriving, he steals Stalin's personal documents from the safe and gives them to one of his men. Beria then calls Georgy Malenkov, the Deputy Chairman of the Council of Ministers, to inform him of Stalin's declining health and to summon him to the dacha immediately. As Malenkov panics, Beria encourages him not to call the doctors because Stalin, sunk deep in paranoia, believes there is a plot by Jewish doctors against him. Malenkov instead suggests they wait for the Central Committee to arrive and decide what to do next. The Committee arrives without Vyacheslav Molotov, who is on Stalin's list of enemies. The Committee decides that Lidiya Timashuk, a female doctor who accused her own colleagues of plotting to assassinate Stalin, should examine Stalin.

Upon receiving medical confirmation that Stalin may not recover, Beria rushes off to Lubyanka, authorizes the NKVD to put Moscow and other major cities in lockdown to avoid unrest, and declares that the Pravda newspaper is now the only source of information to be allowed in and out of Moscow. The NKVD brings Stalin's daughter Svetlana to his bedside; she had distanced herself from her father and has grown critical of him for arresting her lover Aleksei Kapler. Stalin's son Vasily also returns. The American-made artificial ventilator is found to be incompatible with the Soviet electrical plug; without it, Stalin dies. Doctors remove his brain and organs for further study; Vasily, furious, kills many of them and is arrested. After the incident, Beria orders the NKVD troops to loot Stalin's dacha, evacuate his house servants and execute witnesses. As the news of Stalin's death spreads throughout the Soviet Union, Maria smiles happily while much of the populace mourns.

Beria visits Polina, Molotov's wife, who was believed to be dead, and reveals to her that he falsified her death to Stalin because Stalin intended to use her life as a bargaining chip to buy Molotov's loyalty. During the Central Committee meeting, Malenkov is named the chairman of the council of ministers while being controlled by Beria, who is now promoted to first deputy chairman. Beria sidelines Khrushchev by putting him in charge of Stalin's funeral. Svetlana begins having a nightmare of her father arresting her lover and cold-heartedly arranging her marriage to someone else. A telephone call wakes her up and the caller demands that she attend her father's funeral under orders of the committee. She rushes to the place where the funeral is being held, only to realize that it is just a rehearsal.

Meanwhile, Beria is enraged at Khrushchev for allowing a crowd of mourners to enter Moscow by train because Beria believes that large crowds may start a revolution. After Svetlana refuses to attend her father's funeral, Beria convinces Malenkov to allow Vasily to attend Stalin's funeral as Stalin's only living son. As Stalin's funeral commences, a large crowd of mourners reaches the city. The NKVD guards fire warning shots but the crowd continues to march and begins singing the Internationale while throwing rocks at the guards. One of the rocks hits an officer and he orders the guards to open fire on the crowd. After the carnage ends, the officer shows regret, kneeling in a state of shock.

After the funeral, Vasily becomes drunk at the official party, slips into hysteria, and begins yelling loudly that he believes that his father was assassinated. Vasily's commanding officer strips him of his rank and discharges him from the military. Vasily is arrested again for inviting foreign journalists to Moscow without authorization. Beria, fearing for Vasily's life, suggests to Malenkov that they should send him to an asylum to avoid court-martial. As Malenkov walks to his car, Khrushchev shows up and asks for a ride to his dacha. Khrushchev convinces Malenkov to join him in a coup against Beria; Malenkov agrees out of fear that one day Beria will turn on him. Khrushchev, Malenkov, and Molotov have a discussion on Molotov's apartment's balcony, as they know that Beria is using its telephone to listen in on the interior of the apartment. Molotov is enraged at Beria for disobeying Stalin's order to execute Polina and agrees to join Khrushchev's coup, but he demands a total purge of the NKVD, similar to the 1936 Great Purge. Khrushchev suggests that Marshall Zhukov join the coup because Zhukov dislikes Beria and because the conspirators need the army.

At an unknown asylum, Vasily's mental condition deteriorates. He continues to believe that he will live under his father's shadow for eternity, and he begins telling Beria about the night his mother committed suicide. Then he becomes unresponsive, and Beria asks the nurse to get Vasily something "strong" before leaving with a sorrowful expression.

Three months later, Khrushchev, Malenkov, and Molotov initiate their coup and signal Zhukov to arrest Beria, who surrenders without much resistance. In prison, Beria remarks that he knew this day would come as he slowly walks toward his execution. Beria, being cynical, knows that the press will label him a traitor and remarks about how much power the Party wields by fabricating the truth. Elsewhere, during a concert, Maria jokes to one of the musicians about two NKVD officers being happy at Beria's execution because he raped both of their daughters, to the discomfort of her associates. Before the firing squad executes Beria, his final thought is: "They've washed their hands in my blood and now they want to start afresh, to look ahead towards a Glorious Future."

== Reception ==
The first volume was award the Historia Prize in September of 2011. In October of 2012, the second volume won the Château de Cheverny Prize for Historical Comics.

== Adaptation ==
In 2017, the Scottish writer and producer Armando Iannucci adapted the comic books into a movie called The Death of Stalin.

In 2024, a Czech-language stage adaptation, written by Daniel Majling, premiered in Dejvické Divadlo in Prague

== Publications ==
- Agonie, Dargaud, (ISBN 978-2-205-06676-0), October 2010
  writer: Fabien Nury - designer: Thierry Robin - color: Lorien Aureyre
- Funérailles, Dargaud, (ISBN 978-2-205-06822-1), May 2012
  writer: Fabien Nury - designer: Thierry Robin - Color : Lorien Aureyre and Thierry Robin
