= Paris Police 1900 =

French crime drama television series

- Genre: Crime drama Drama; Action fiction
- Created by: Frédéric Balekdjian; Fabien Nury
- Starring: Marc Barbé; Jérémie Laheurte; Evelyne Brochu
- Country of origin: France
- Original language: French
- No. of series: 1
- No. of episodes: 8

Production
- Running time: 52 minutes

Original release
- Network: Canal+
- Release: February 8 – March 1, 2021

Related
- Paris Police 1905; Paris Police 1910

Paris Police 1900 is a French crime drama television series created by Fabien Nury that was first broadcast on 8 February 2021 on Canal+ in France and was shown on BBC Four in October 2021. A follow-up series of six episodes, featuring the same characters and called Paris Police 1905, was released in 2022, and a third series, Paris Police 1910, in 2026.

== Synopsis ==
In 1899 in Paris, the Third Republic is in crisis again. Amid civic unrest fuelled by rumours of the impending release of Alfred Dreyfus, the government is under threat from nationalists, royalists and anti-Semites on one hand and from anarchists on the other. The situation is made worse by the sudden death of the President, Félix Faure.

It is against this background that Antoine Jouin, an ambitious young detective of the Police Prefecture, is assigned to investigate the dismembered torso of a young woman found in a suitcase floating down the Seine. In the course of the investigation, Jouin encounters Louis Lépine (retired Prefect of Police, recalled to restore order in Paris), Jeanne Chauvin (the second woman in France to obtain a law degree and to be licensed to plead at the bar) and Meg Steinheil (a notorious demimondaine turned police informant).

All become involved in the suppression of a more serious plot: a threatened coup against the Republic, orchestrated by the Guérin family. Connections are discovered between the dead woman and the police, in the form of rogue officer Joseph Fiersi, as well as with the aristocratic Gabriel Sabran de Pontevès and his family.

== Cast ==
- Jérémie Laheurte as Antoine Jouin, inspired by (or precursor of) Louis-François Jouin, policeman killed by Jules Bonnot in 1912.
- Évelyne Brochu as Marguerite Steinheil
- Thibaut Évrard as Joseph Fiersi
- Marc Barbé as Louis Lépine
- Eugénie Derouand as Jeanne Chauvin
- Patrick d'Assumçao as Commissaire Puybaraud
- Alexandre Trocki as Commissaire Cochefert
- Hubert Delattre as Jules Guérin
- Valérie Dashwood as Mme Lépine
- Yannick Landrein as Sébastien Faure
- Jean-Benoît Ugeux as Morpinet
- Christophe Montenez as Gabriel Sabran de Pontevès
- Christian Hecq as Alphonse Bertillon
- Astrid Roos as Hélène Chagnolle
- Vincent Debost as Hector
- Anthony Paliotti as Louis Guérin
- Anne Benoit as Maman Guérin
- Renaud Rutten as Alphonse Chagnolle
- Nicolas Bouchaud as Weidmann
- Dan Herzberg as Jeannot Dornet
- Yann Collette as le comte Sabran de Pontevès
- Steve Driesen as Pierre Waldeck-Rousseau
- Olivier Pajot as Félix Faure
- Marie-Armelle Deguy as la comtesse de Vaudois
- Noam Morgensztern as Gustave Pertaud
- Eddie Chignara as Édouard Drumont
- Renaud Hezeques as l'inspecteur Guichard
- Raphaël Thiéry as Mimile

== Episodes ==
No.	Title	Original release date
1	Episode 1	February 8, 2021
Paris, 1899. President Félix Faure has just died in the arms of his mistress. While the Republic is on the verge of explosion, Prefect Lépine is called back to business. At the same time, at the prefecture, Inspector Jouin was mobilized on a major investigation to identify the unknown person in the suitcase.
2	Episode 2	February 8, 2021
The courtesan Meg, who became a spy on behalf of Puybaraud, head of the Police Department and sworn enemy of the Prefect, infiltrates the Guérins. At the Paris police, Jouin investigates with Commissioner Cochefert into the case of the bloody suitcase and the disappearance of Joséphine Berger. Fiersi is assigned to the investigation.
3	Episode 3	February 15, 2021
Inspector Jouin falls in love with Jeanne Chauvin, a young lawyer with a strong character, who may not practice but serves as an assistant to Master Weidmann in the Jewish quarter. She decides to help him in the Berger case. For her part, Meg receives Madame Lépine, the prefect's wife, at home, whose penchant for artificial paradises has not escaped Commissioner Puybaraud.
4	"Episode 4"	February 15, 2021
At the Sûreté, everyone is working to resolve the Berger affair; the police need to prove their effectiveness. A few days before the opening of the Dreyfus trial, tension is mounting in the streets of Paris. Lépine foils to his advantage the trap of personal scandal set for his wife.
5	Episode 5	February 22, 2021
Meg has fallen under the spell of Gabriel Sabran, as more and more evidence appears against him in the investigation into the murder of Josephine. This rapprochement makes her a particularly troublesome witness for the Guérins and Gabriel's father.
6	Episode 6	February 22, 2021
Exhausted by years of enslavement and disgusted by the Berger affair, Fiersi dissociates himself from Puybaraud. It provides Jouin with an essential element in his investigation, which still counts on the support of Jeanne to help him in this affair. Jules Guérin, for his part, took refuge in rue Chabrol.
7	Episode 7	March 1, 2021
While Maman Guérin organizes the final details of the riots which are to converge on rue Chabrol, Prefect Lépine receives unexpected help from the anarchists. Fiersi is on the run, Jouin continues the investigation alone and protects Jeanne from the murder she has just committed to save him.
8	Episode 8	March 1, 2021
Jouin wants to find out the whole truth about the Sabran, taking the risk of losing Jeanne. Meg is now thinking about the future and playing her last card with the Prefect. Lépine, a fine strategist, allowed time to work in his favour in the so-called Fort Chabrol affair. His wife offers him unexpected support.

== Reception ==
The show was widely praised by critics, with Phil Harrison, for The Guardian, describing it as "A classy, raunchy Parisian noir... A promising mixture of high intrigue and low cunning."
