= Evelyne Brochu =

Canadian actress

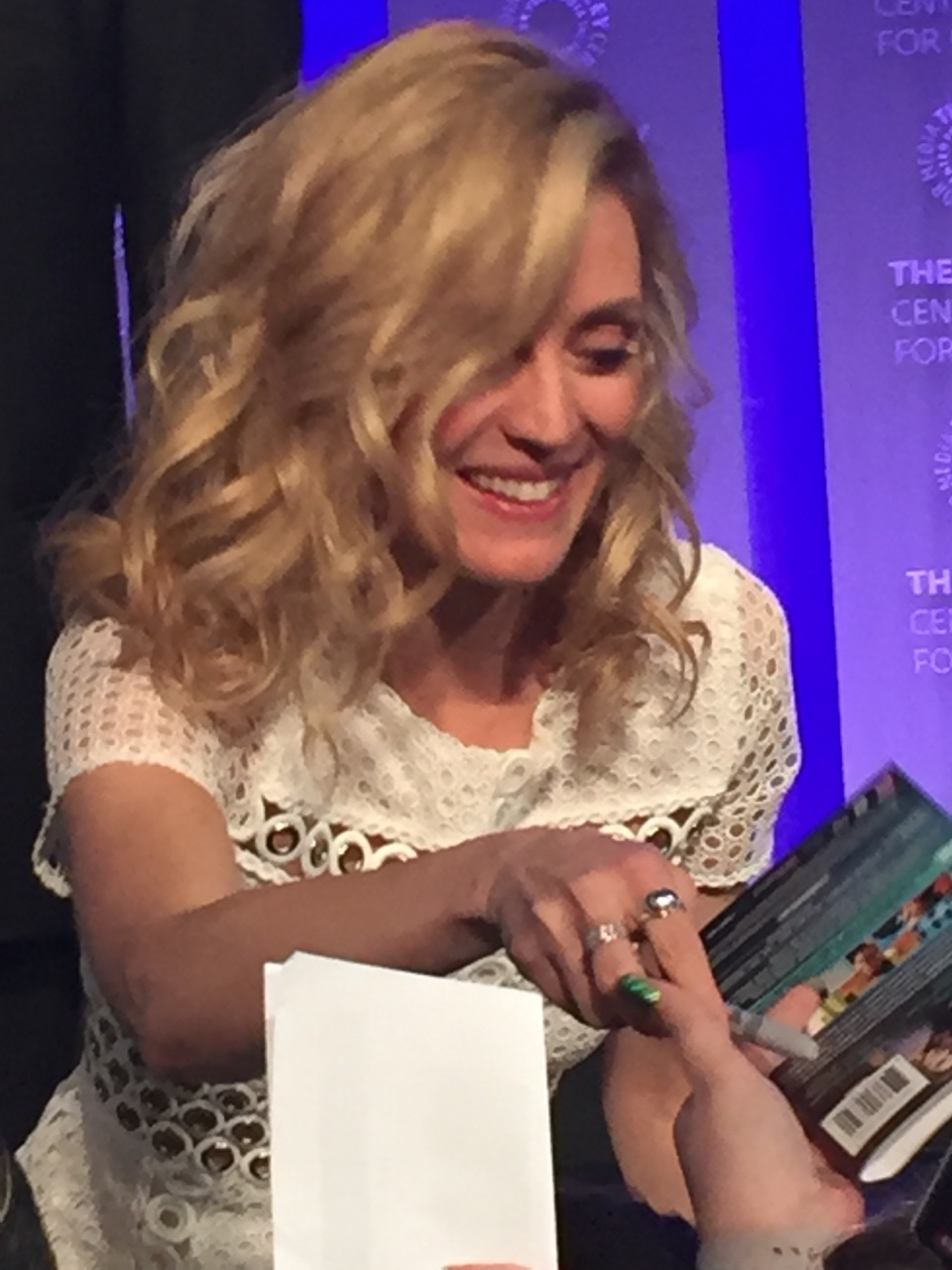
- Brochu in 2017
- Born: November 17, 1982 (age 43); Quebec City, Quebec, Canada
- Occupations: Actress, Singer
- Years active: 2006–present
- Partner: Nicolas Schirmer
- Children: 3

Signature
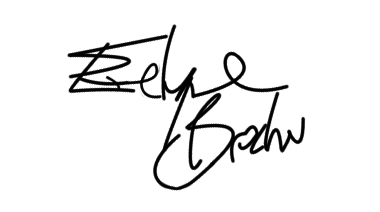

Evelyne Brochu (born November 17, 1982) is a Canadian actress and singer-songwriter. In 2013, she became well known for her English-speaking role as Delphine Cormier, a French scientist on the hit Canadian science fiction thriller TV series Orphan Black. She has also released two studio albums as well as several singles.

== Early life ==
Brochu grew up in Pointe-Claire, a suburb of Montreal, Quebec. Her native language is French, but she has also spoken English from an early age. Growing up she had anglophone friends and learned English at Jean XXIII High School in Dorval, Quebec. She studied drama at the Cégep de Saint-Laurent. In 2005, Brochu graduated from the Conservatoire d'art dramatique in Montreal.

She says a key turning point in learning English was when she became an avid viewer of The Fresh Prince of Bel-Air as a child. Her father left when she was 1 1/2 years old and, when her father later remarried, she found herself with a step-sister. Brochu has stated that she has a good relationship with her stepmother. Her mother is a violoncello teacher and her father worked as a taxi driver.

While out cycling, she was hit by a truck and was told by her doctors that to keep her knee in good shape she could no longer run or dance. She stopped both and took up yoga and acting.

== Career ==
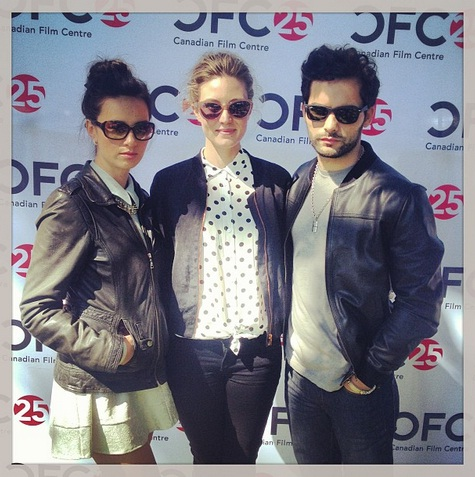
Brochu (middle) with Cara Gee and Johnathan Sousa (TIFF 2013)

Some of her most prominent French-speaking roles include: Chloé in Inch'Allah, Rose in Café de Flore, Sara in Tom at the Farm, and Stéphanie in Polytechnique.

In 2013, she became well known for her English-speaking role as Delphine Cormier, a French scientist on the hit TV series Orphan Black.

Brochu portrayed Aurora Luft in CBC Television's spy thriller X Company.

Brochu also has a successful singing career. She released a duet with Félix Dyotte entitled "C'est l'été, c'est l'été, c'est l'été", in 2016, as well as appearing on Dyotte's 2017 album Politesses on the song "Je cours", and has released a solo single entitled "Quoi".

In September 2019 Brochu, in cooperation with Dyotte, released her first music album called Objets Perdus. In 2020, Dyotte won the SOCAN Songwriting Prize in the French category for the album's single "Maintenant ou jamais".

In September 2023, Brochu released another album in cooperation with Dyotte titled Le Danger.

== Personal life ==
She previously dated Canadian actor François Arnaud, however in a May 2014 interview she stated that they were no longer together. Her cousin is Xarah Dion, a French-Canadian singer.

In February 2015, Brochu stated in an interview that she is a feminist and that she struggled when portraying Aurora Luft in X Company:

There was a moment in Episode 2 when I was with [co-star Dustin Milligan], when I have to give him orders, I don’t want to do that, and he doesn’t want me to do that, and my first instinct, as a woman, was to smooth it out for him. The director was like, no, you’re a sergeant now. You have to give orders. You have authority. I'm a feminist, it’s 2015.

She resides in Montreal, Quebec.

Brochu is fluent in English and French but can also speak Spanish well. She can perform contemporary dance and yoga. Brochu also has musical talents which include being able to play the drums, guitar and piano as well as singing mezzo-soprano and alto.

In June 2018, she confirmed her pregnancy with a picture on her Instagram account with her boyfriend Nicolas Schirmer. Their son, Laurier, was born on October 6, 2018. In August 2020, she revealed to be pregnant with twins. She confirmed the birth of the twins, Camille and Matthias, on Instagram on November 16.

== Filmography ==
=== Television ===
| Year | Title | Role | Creator | Notes |
|---|---|---|---|---|
| 2008–2012 | The Promise (La Promesse) | Mélanie Gauthier | Martin Thibault | Soap opera |
| 2009 | Admit (Aveux) | Jolianne Laplante | Claude Desrosiers | TV series (12 episodes) |
| 2010 | Mirador | Mylène Émard | Louis Choquette | TV series (7 episodes) |
| 2013–2017 | Orphan Black | Delphine Cormier | Graeme Manson; John Fawcett | TV series (28 episodes); Recurring cast seasons 1, 4, and 5; Main cast seasons 2 and 3 |
| 2014 | The Godmother (La Marraine) | Catherine/Valérie | Alain DesRochers | Séries+ five-part drama |
| 2015–2017 | X Company | Aurora Luft | Mark Ellis & Stephanie Morgenstern | TV series (Main role) |
| 2017–2019 | Trop | Isabelle | Marie-Andrée Labbé | TV series (Main role) |
| 2018 | Féminin/Féminin | Delphine | Chloé Robichaud | Web series (7 episodes) |
| 2018–2019 | Thanksgiving | Louise Mercier | Nicolas Saada | Miniseries (3 episodes) |
| 2021 | Paris Police 1900 | Marguerite Steinheil | Fabien Nury | French TV series (8 episodes) |
| 2022 | Paris Police 1905 | Marguerite Steinheil | Fabien Nury | French TV series (8 episodes) |
| 2022 | Chouchou | Chanelle Chouinard (Chouchou) | Simon Boulerice | TV series (Main role) |
| 2024 | Orphan Black: Echoes | Delphine Cormier | Anna Fishko | TV series (1 episode) |
| 2024 | Dans l'ombre | Marylin | Pierre Schoeller | French TV series (6 episodes) |

=== Film ===
| Year | Title | Role | Director | Notes |
|---|---|---|---|---|
| 2006 | Cheech | Pharmacist | Patrice Sauvé | |
| 2008 | Father Talk (Dire sur mon père) | Evelyne Beauregard-McClean | Gabrielle Tremblay | Short film |
| 2009 | Polytechnique | Stéphanie | Denis Villeneuve | |
| 2009 | The Master Key (Grande Ourse) | Jézabel Garneau | Patrice Sauvé | Sci-Fi |
| 2011 | Thrill of the Hills (Frisson des collines) | Hélène Paradis | Richard Roy | |
| 2011 | Café de Flore | Rose | Jean-Marc Vallée | |
| 2012 | The Apartment (L'Appartement) | | Michel Lam | Short film alongside Julie Le Breton |
| 2012 | Inch'Allah | Chloé | Anaïs Barbeau-Lavalette | Nominated—1st Canadian Screen Awards as Best Lead Actress |
| 2012 | La Trappe | | Sophie B. Jacques | Short film |
| 2013 | Evelyne's World | Evelyne | Benjamin Lebus; Sebastian de Souza | Short film shot in Hungary |
| 2013 | UNTTLD Sun | | Dominique Loubier | Short Fashion film for Canadian brand UNTTLD S/S 2013 |
| 2013 | Tom at the Farm (Tom à la ferme) | Sara | Xavier Dolan | Nominated – Canadian Screen Award for Best Supporting Actress |
| 2013 | An Extraordinary Person (Quelqu'un d'extraordinaire) | | Monia Chokri | Short film |
| 2014 | UNTTLD Soul | | Dominique Loubier | |
| 2014 | The Nest | Celestine | David Cronenberg | Short film working as a trailer for Cronenberg's book "Consumed" |
| 2014 | Pawn Sacrifice | Donna | Edward Zwick | |
| 2014 | The Wolves (Les Loups) | Elie | Sophie Deraspe | Shot in Magdalen Islands |
| 2016 | Miséricorde | Mary Ann | Fulvio Bernasconi | Switzerland-Québec production |
| 2016 | Le Passé Devant Nous | Alice | Nathalie Teirlinck | |
| 2016 | Rememory | Wendy | Mark Palansky | |
| 2019 | Cash Nexus (Ca$h Nexu$) | Juliette | François Delisle | |
| 2019 | A Brother's Love (La femme de mon frère) | Eloise | Monia Chokri | |
| 2024 | French Girl (Chez les beaux-parents) | Sophie Tremblay | Nicolas Wright & James A. Woods | |
| 2024 | Phoenixes (Phénix) | Michelle | Jonathan Beaulieu-Cyr | |
| 2026 | Haunted (Hantée) | Judith | Rafaël Ouellet | |

=== Theatre ===
| Year | Title | Role | Director | Theatre |
|---|---|---|---|---|
| 2006 | Uncle's Dream | Farpoukhina | Igor Ovadis | Dubunker |
| 2007 | Arabian Night | Vanina | Théodor Cristian Popescu | Théâtre de Quat'Sous |
| 2007 | Sacred family | Mylène | Michel Poirier | Beaumont Theatre St Michel |
| 2008 | The Lion in Winter | Alix | Daniel Roussel | Jean Duceppe Company |
| 2009 | Wake up and sing! | Hennie | Luce Pelletier | Théâtre de l'Opsis |
| 2009 | Room(s) | Evelyne Brochu | Éric Jean | Théâtre de Quat'Sous |
| 2011 | Tom à la Ferme | Sara | Claude Poissant | Théâtre d'Aujourd'Hui |
| 2014 | Comment s'occuper de bébé | Donna | Sylvain Bélanger | Théâtre la Licorne |
| 2018 | L'Idiot | Nastassia Filippovna | Catherine Vidal | Théâtre du Nouveau Monde |
| 2020 | Les 3 Sœurs | Macha | René Richard Cyr | Théâtre du Nouveau Monde |

== Awards and nominations ==
| Year | Award | Category | Work | Result |
|---|---|---|---|---|
| 2010 | Prix Gémeaux | Best Supporting Actress | Aveux | Nominated |
| 2012 | Prix Gémeaux | Best Actress | La Promesse | Won |
| 2013 | Canadian Screen Award | Best Performance by an Actress in a Leading Role | Inch'Allah | Nominated |
| 2014 | Canadian Screen Award | Best Performance by an Actress in a Supporting Role | Tom at the Farm | Nominated |
| 2014 | Prix Gémeaux | Best Performance by an Actress in a Supporting Role | La Marraine | Nominated |
| 2015 | Jutra Award | Best Performance by an Actress in a Supporting Role | Tom at the Farm | Nominated |
| 2017 | Tiburon International Film Festival | Best Actress | Le Passe Devant Nous | Won |
| 2017 | Hamilton Film Festival | Best Actress | Le Passe Devant Nous | Won |
| 2018 | Prix Gémeaux | Best Leading Female Role | Trop | Nominated |
| 2020 | Prix Gémeaux | Best Leading Female Role | Trop | Nominated |
| 2020 | SOCAN Songwriting Prize | SOCAN Songwriting Prize: Francophone | Maintenant ou jamais by Félix Dyotte | Won |
| 2020 | ADISQ | Best POP Album of the Year and Best Newcomer of the Year | Objets perdus | Nominated |
| 2020 | GAMIQ | Best POP Album of the Year | Objets perdus | Nominated |

== Music ==
=== Studio albums ===
| Year | Title |
|---|---|
| 2019 | Objets Perdus |
| 2023 | Le Danger |

=== Singles ===
| As lead artist | | As featured artist | |
| Year | Title | Year | Title |
|---|---|---|---|
| 2019 | Copie carbone | 2016 | C'est l'été, c'est l'été, c'est l'été (Félix Dyotte feat. Evelyne Brochu) |
| 2019 | Maintenant ou jamais | 2017 | Je cours (Félix Dyotte feat. Evelyne Brochu) |
| 2019 | Escale à Madrid | | |

=== Videography ===
| As lead artist | | As featured artist | |
| Year | Title | Year | Title |
|---|---|---|---|
| 2019 | Maintenant ou jamais | 2016 | C'est l'été, c'est l'été, c'est l'été (feat. Félix Dyotte) |
| 2019 | Escale à Madrid (Session live) | 2017 | Je cours (feat. Félix Dyotte) |
| 2019 | Difficile | | |
| 2020 | Sept jours exactement (version officielle avec paroles) | | |
