= Kote Tsintsadze =

Georgian Bolshevik (1887–1930)

Kote Tsintsadze (Georgian: კოტე ცინცაძე, Russian: Котэ Цинцадзе) (1887–1930) was a Georgian Bolshevik who was the first chairman of Georgian Cheka and involved in the Russian Revolutions and the Sovietization of Georgia. He was purged under Joseph Stalin as a member of the Left Opposition within the Communist Party of the Soviet Union.

Tsintsadze joined the Russian Social Democratic Labour Party in 1904, and sided with its Bolshevik faction. During the Russian Revolution of 1905, he was closely associated with the famous revolutionary fighter Simon Petrosian, better known as Kamo and served as head of the Bolshevik armed detachments that engaged in expropriation and robbery organised in the Manganese mine of Chiatura.

In 1906 he took part in the execution of traitors after the Bolshevik battle squads were driven out of the cities. On February 16, 1906, Tsintsadze took part in the assassination of Commander in chief of the Caucasus, General Fyodor Griiazanov (nicknamed General Shitheap). Joseph Stalin commissioned the hitmen who pretended to be painting a nearby gate. They threw grenades at his carriage and blew him to pieces.

Then Stalin commissioned him to set up the Druzhina (outfit) or Bolshevik expropriator's club for robbing banks. He robbed the Tiflis pawn shop, the Georgian Bank of Agriculture, a train at Kars, a stagecoach in Borzhomi, stole 20,000 rubles from the Kadzhorskoe stagecoach and ambushed a gold train at Chiatura carrying 21,000 roubles of miners' wages. He was at Stalin's wedding supper in 1906.

In 1907, he was arrested by the Okhrana, then joined Stalin's 'Mauserists' in Baku. On August 15, 1912, he helped spring Kamo from Tiflis prison. On September 24 the two of them ambushed a mail coach with 18 gunmen three miles from Tiflis. They were beaten back though seven Cossacks died. After this, the Druzhina was destroyed.

In 1917, Stalin introduced Tsintsadze to Vladimir Lenin "Meet Kote Tsintsadze the old bank robber-terrorist of the Caucasus."

During the Russian Civil War, Tsintsadze was a Cheka officer. Later, he became the first permanent chairman of the Georgian Cheka, which was established in February 1921, immediately following the Red Army invasion of Georgia. At the same time, Tsintsadze was a member of the Communist Party Central Committee and of the Central Executive Committee of the Communist Party of the Georgian SSR. Although ruthless against the widespread anti-Soviet opposition in Georgia, he was a strong proponent of Georgian sovereignty from Moscow and, during the 1922 Georgian Affair, engaged in a bitter political confrontation with Stalin and Sergo Ordzhonikidze whom the Georgian moderate Communists accused of "Great Russian chauvinism". As a result, Tsintsadze was denounced as a "national deviationist" by Stalin's supporters and removed from his posts later that year, being replaced by E. A. Kvantaliani, who was more compliant with the centralizers' policy.

Having joined the Left Opposition in 1923, and supported Leon Trotsky in the power struggle that followed Lenin's death, Tsintsadze was expelled from the Communist Party in December 1927 and arrested in 1928 and exiled to Bakhchysarai, in Crimea. In 1929, he moved to Alushta, also in Crimea.

Despite his failing health, Tsintsadze resisted every suggestion that he disown the Left Opposition, denouncing those who did, such as Ivan Smirnov as "worthless revolutionaries". In a letter to Trotsky, he forecast that "Many, very many, of our friends, and of the people close to us, will have to end their lives in prison or somewhere in deportation. Yet in the last resort this will be an enrichment of revolutionary history: a new generation will learn the lesson." Trotsky lamented that there were too few "fighters of Tsintsadze's type" in the Communist Parties of the West.

Tsintsadze's appeal to be allowed to return for Georgia because of his health was not granted, and he died in exile, from tuberculosis.
