= The Death of Stalin =

2017 film by Armando Iannucci

- British cinema release poster
- Directed by: Armando Iannucci
- Written by: Armando Iannucci; David Schneider; Ian Martin; Peter Fellows (additional material)
- Screenplay by: Fabien Nury
- Based on: La Mort de Staline by: Fabien Nury (writer) &; Thierry Robin (illustrator)
- Produced by: Yann Zenou; Laurent Zeitoun; Nicolas Duval Adassovsky; Kevin Loader
- Starring: Steve Buscemi; Simon Russell Beale; Paddy Considine; Rupert Friend; Jason Isaacs; Michael Palin; Andrea Riseborough; Jeffrey Tambor
- Cinematography: Zac Nicholson
- Edited by: Peter Lambert
- Music by: Christopher Willis
- Production companies: Gaumont; Quad Productions; Main Journey; France 3 Cinema; La Cie Cinématographique; Panache Productions; AFPI; Canal+; Ciné+; France Télévisions; Title Media
- Distributed by: eOne Films (UK); Gaumont (France); September Film Distribution (Belgium)
- Release dates: 8 September 2017 (TIFF); 20 October 2017 (United Kingdom); 4 April 2018 (France); 18 April 2018 (Belgium)
- Running time: 107 minutes
- Countries: UK; France; Belgium
- Language: English
- Budget: $13 million
- Box office: $24.6 million

The Death of Stalin is a 2017 British-French-Belgian political satire black comedy film directed by Armando Iannucci and written by Iannucci, David Schneider and Ian Martin with Peter Fellows. Based on the French graphic novel La Mort de Staline (2010–2012), the film depicts the internal social and political power struggle among the members of the Soviet Politburo following the death of leader Joseph Stalin in 1953.

The French-British-Belgian co-production stars an ensemble cast that includes Steve Buscemi, Simon Russell Beale, Paddy Considine, Rupert Friend, Jason Isaacs, Olga Kurylenko, Michael Palin, Andrea Riseborough, Dermot Crowley, Paul Chahidi, Adrian McLoughlin, Paul Whitehouse, and Jeffrey Tambor.

The film premiered on 8 September 2017 at the Toronto International Film Festival. It was released theatrically in the United Kingdom by Entertainment One Films on 20 October 2017, in France by Gaumont on 4 April 2018, and in Belgium by September Film Distribution on 18 April 2018. It received critical acclaim and various accolades, including nominations for two British Academy Film Awards, one of which was for Outstanding British Film, and 13 British Independent Film Awards, four of which it won. There was fierce opposition to the film in Russia, where it was seen as "anti-Russian propaganda", and it was banned there, as well as in Kyrgyzstan, for allegedly mocking the Soviet Union and its past.

== Plot ==
For 20 years, Stalin's NKVD security forces have imposed The Great Terror. Those on Stalin's list of 'enemy' names are arrested, exiled or shot.

— Opening caption

On the night of 1 March 1953, Josef Stalin demands the director of Radio Moscow provide a recording of a live recital of Mozart's Piano Concerto No. 23 after the show has concluded. The director recalls the audience and orchestra and records the recreated concert. Pianist Maria Yudina, who hates the cruel dictator, only complies after being bribed and slips a note into the recording before it is couriered to Stalin.

Stalin is hosting a tense, but rowdy, gathering of Central Committee members at Kuntsevo Dacha. As Foreign Minister Vyacheslav Molotov leaves, NKVD head Lavrentiy Beria reveals to Nikita Khrushchev and Deputy Chairman Georgy Malenkov that Molotov is to be part of the latest purge. The concert recording arrives and Maria's note, admonishing Stalin and wishing him dead, causes him to suffer a cerebral haemorrhage as he laughs at the note. Stalin's guards hear him fall in his office but fear disturbing him.

Stalin's housemaid discovers him unconscious the next morning and members of the Central Committee rush to the dacha. Beria finds Maria's note but only after Malenkov, Khrushchev, Lazar Kaganovich, Anastas Mikoyan, and Nikolai Bulganin arrive, does the Committee finally decide to send for medical help. The best doctors in Moscow have been arrested after the "Doctors' plot". When Stalin dies under the care of mediocre doctors, Beria orders the NKVD to relieve the Soviet Army of control of Moscow.

Beria and Khrushchev vie for the support of Molotov and of Stalin's children, Svetlana and her unstable, alcoholic brother Vasily. Beria removes Molotov's name from the impending purge and releases Polina Zhemchuzhina, Molotov's wife, from prison. The Committee names Malenkov, a puppet of Beria, as chairman. He hijacks Khrushchev's proposed reforms, such as releasing political prisoners and loosening clerical restrictions, relegating Khrushchev to planning Stalin's funeral.

Beria threatens Khrushchev with Maria's note, and Khrushchev reverses Beria's order to halt all transport into Moscow. When 1,500 arriving mourners are killed, the Committee wants to blame junior NKVD officers. In an effort to deflect blame, Beria threatens his colleagues with documents detailing their involvement in various purges.

Angered by the NKVD's takeover of security from the Army, Marshal Georgy Zhukov supports Khrushchev in launching a coup against Beria after Stalin's funeral. Khrushchev gets support from the rest of the Committee save Malenkov, and on Zhukov's orders the Army reclaims its posts from the NKVD. Zhukov, Kiril Moskalenko and Leonid Brezhnev storm a meeting of the Committee and arrest Beria.

Malenkov reluctantly signs Beria's death warrant. At Beria's emergency trial, Khrushchev finds him guilty of counter-revolutionary activities, sexual assault, and paedophilia. Beria is summarily executed and Zhukov has his body burned. Khrushchev sends Svetlana to Vienna under protest, keeps Vasily in Russia, where he can be watched, and concurs with Kaganovich that Malenkov is too weak to lead.

In 1956, Khrushchev has defeated his rivals on the Committee to become the new leader of the Soviet Union, and is in the audience as Maria once again performs the Mozart concerto. Brezhnev, who will succeed Khrushchev in 1964, eyes Khrushchev from his seat.

== Cast ==
Note: At the time of the film's events, many of the characters' real counterparts did not hold the positions listed in the film, although they did often hold a similar position at a similar period.

- Steve Buscemi as Nikita Khrushchev, 1st Secretary Moscow Committee, initially regarded as Stalin's clown, who manages to out-maneuver Beria and Malenkov to succeed Stalin as General Secretary.
- Simon Russell Beale as Lavrenti Beria, Head of NKVD Security Forces, who vies with Khrushchev for the support of Molotov and Stalin's children, the popular Svetlana and her unstable, alcoholic brother Vasily.
- Paddy Considine as Yuri Andreyev, director of Radio Moscow, who hurriedly refills the half-empty auditorium, fetches a conductor to replace the one who has passed out, and orders the orchestra to play again.
- Rupert Friend as Vasily Stalin, Stalin's unstable, alcoholic son who hides his failures from his father.
- Jason Isaacs as Field Marshal Georgy Zhukov, Head of the Soviet Army, who, irate over the supplanting of the military by the NKVD, supports Khrushchev in a coup against Beria.
- Olga Kurylenko as Maria Veniaminovna Yudina, a pianist who slips a letter into Stalin's record sleeve admonishing Stalin and expressing hope for his death.
- Michael Palin as Vyacheslav Molotov, Foreign Secretary, who was on the list of those to be rounded up by Stalin and who rationalises that Stalin was justified in imprisoning his wife, Polina, even after he welcomes her back when Beria releases her after Stalin's death.
- Andrea Riseborough as Svetlana Stalina, Stalin's daughter, whose support Beria and Khrushchev vie for in their power struggle.
- Dermot Crowley as Lazar Kaganovich, Minister for Labour
- Paul Chahidi as Nikolai Bulganin, Minister for Defence
- Adrian McLoughlin as Josef Stalin, General Secretary of the USSR
- Paul Whitehouse as Anastas Mikoyan, Minister for Trade
- Jeffrey Tambor as Georgy Malenkov, Deputy to Stalin, named Chairman by the Central Committee after Stalin's death, who becomes a pawn in the power struggle between Beria and Khrushchev.
- Tom Brooke as Sergei, an audio engineer for Radio Moscow
- Justin Edwards as Spartak Sokolov (Conductor 1)
- Paul Ready as NKVD Officer Delov, who is ordered to find the girl from the picture with Stalin
- Roger Ashton-Griffiths as Musician 1
- Nicholas Woodeson as Boris Bresnavich (Conductor 2)
- Sylvestra Le Touzel as Nina Khrushcheva, Khrushchev's wife
- Nick Sidi as NKVD Officer Bogdan Kobulov, Beria's right-hand man
- Jonny Phillips as NKVD Officer Pervak, who assists Stalin, and then Malenkov
- Alex Harvey-Brown as Soldier guarding Stalin's bedroom
- Tim Steed as Sergeant guarding Stalin's bedroom
- June Watson as Matryona Petrovna, Stalin's housemaid
- Daniel Tuite as NKVD Officer Sliminov, who tells Beria Stalin is ill
- Karl Johnson as Dr. Pavel Lukomsky, a retired doctor brought in to examine Stalin
- Cara Horgan as Lidiya Timashuk, who helps round up the doctors
- Dan Mersh as Ice Hockey Coach
- Richard Brake as Anatoly Tarasov, Vasily's assistant
- Eva Sayer as Young Waitress molested by Beria
- Diana Quick as Polina Molotova, Molotov's wife, who was imprisoned by Stalin, whom she continues to adore, and is released by Beria after Stalin's death, which makes her cry.
- Jonathan Aris as Mezhnikov, the funeral arranger
- Dave Wong as Zhou Enlai
- Gerald Lepkowski as Leonid Brezhnev, part of the execution squad led by Zhukov
- Luke D'Silva as Kirill Moskalenko, part of the execution squad led by Zhukov
- Daniel Fearn as Marshal Ivan Konev

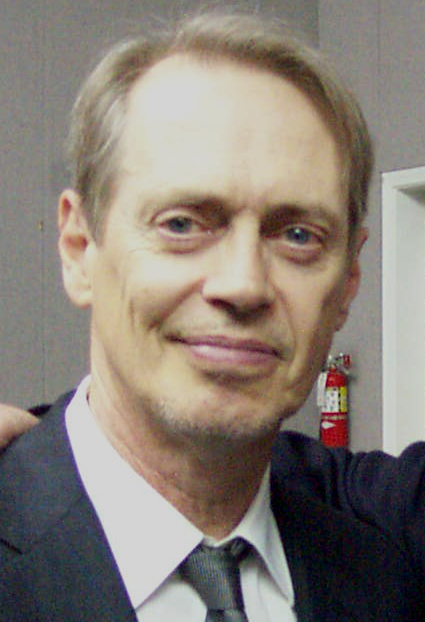
Steve Buscemi plays Nikita Khrushchev

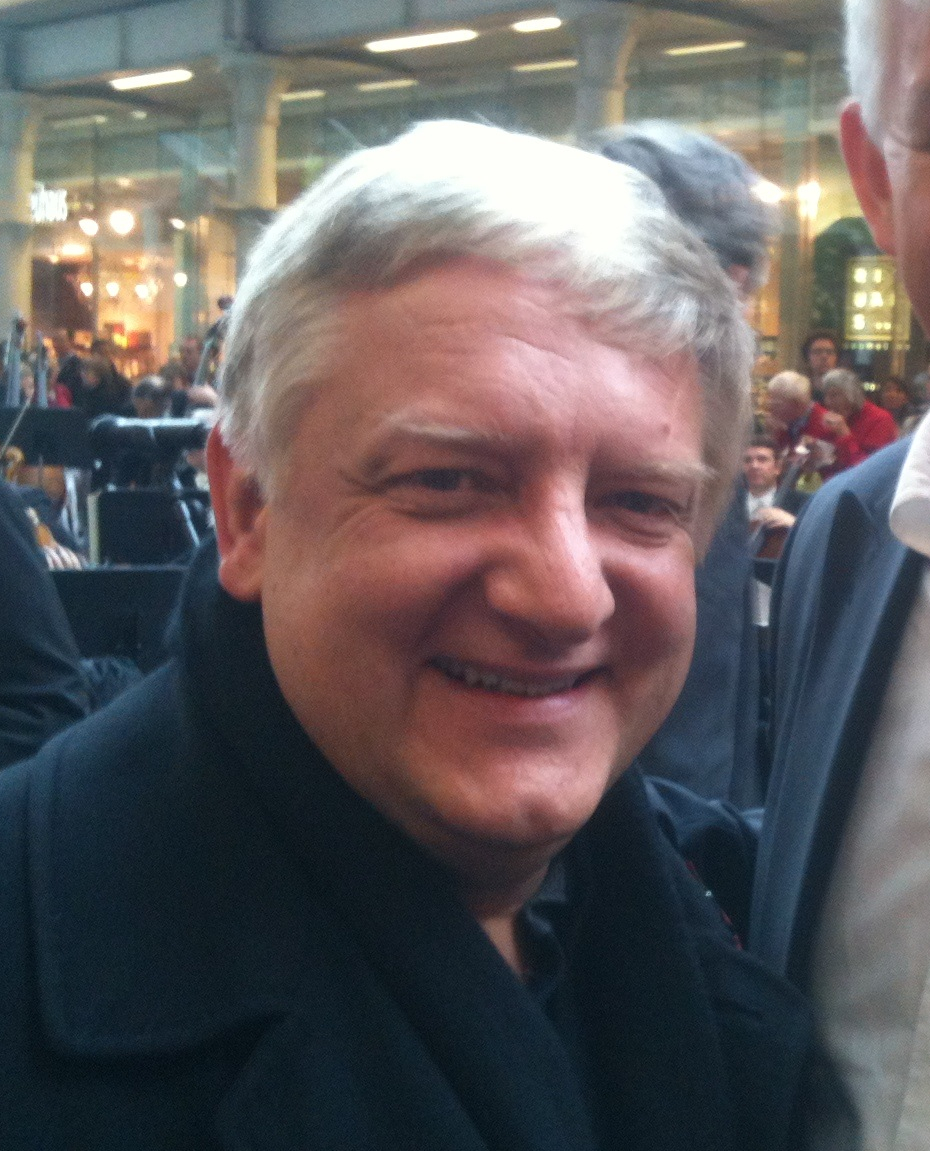
Simon Russell Beale plays Lavrenti Beria

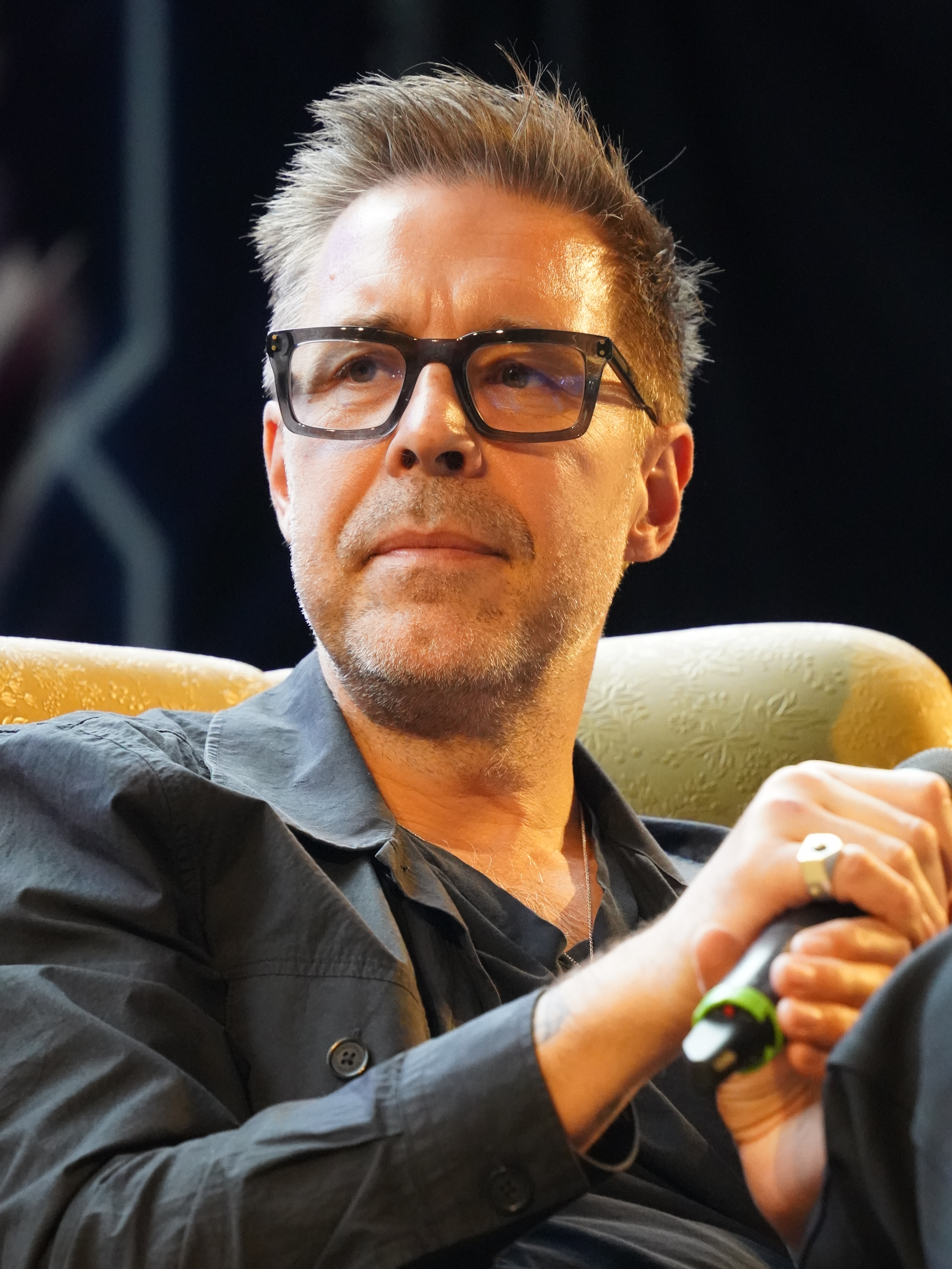
Paddy Considine plays Yuri Andreyev

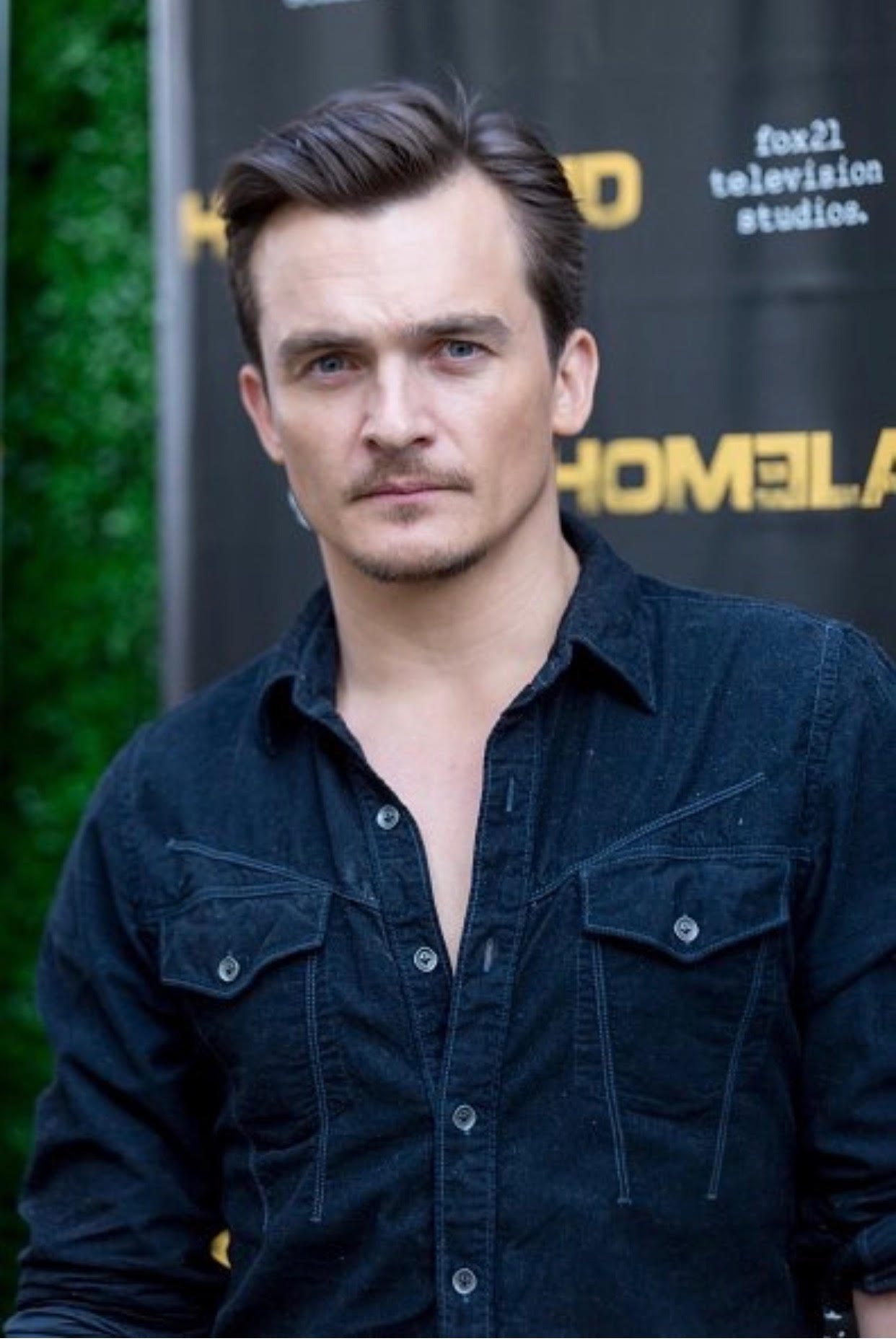
Rupert Friend plays Vasily Stalin

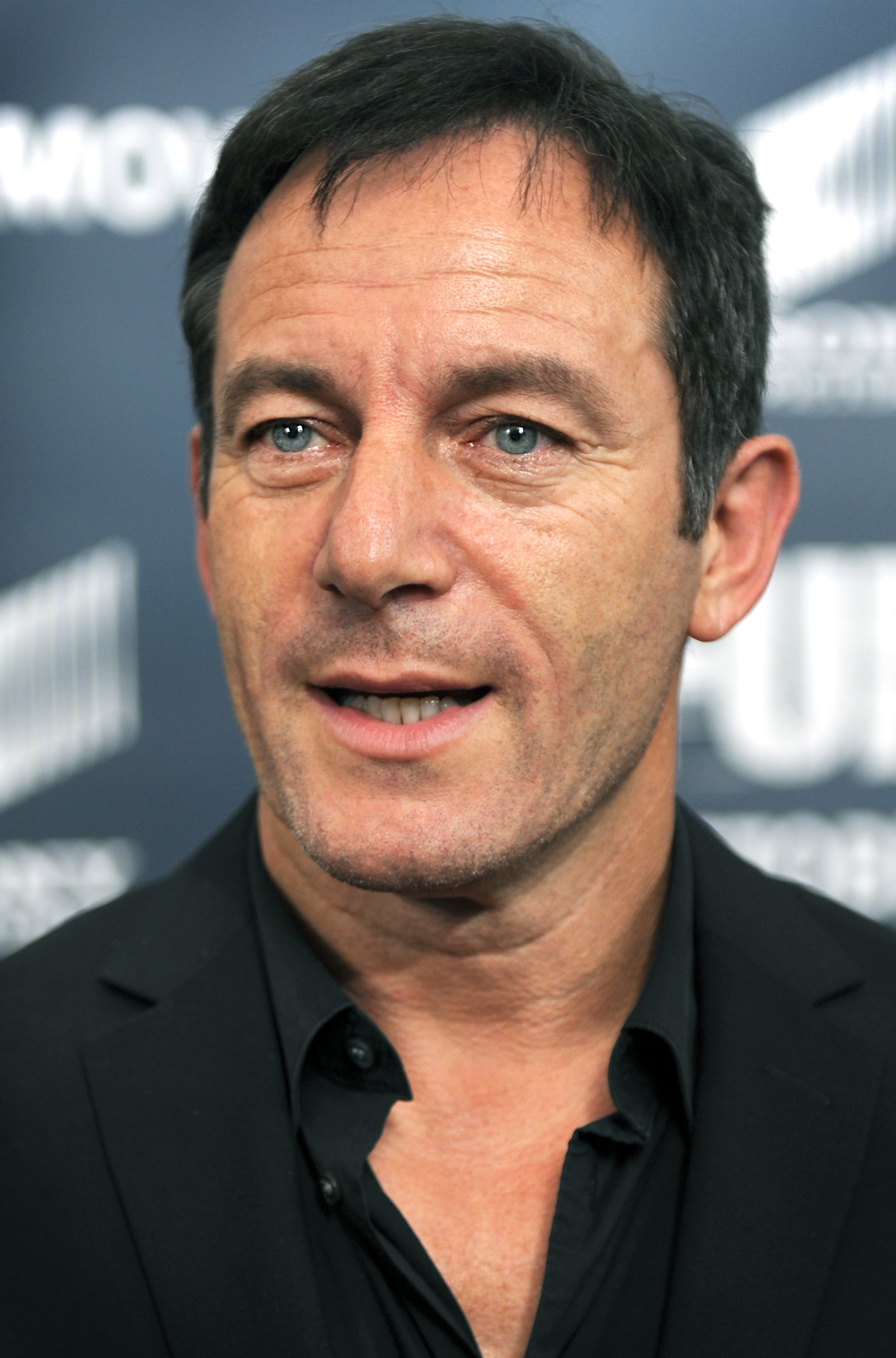
Jason Isaacs plays Field Marshal Georgy Zhukov

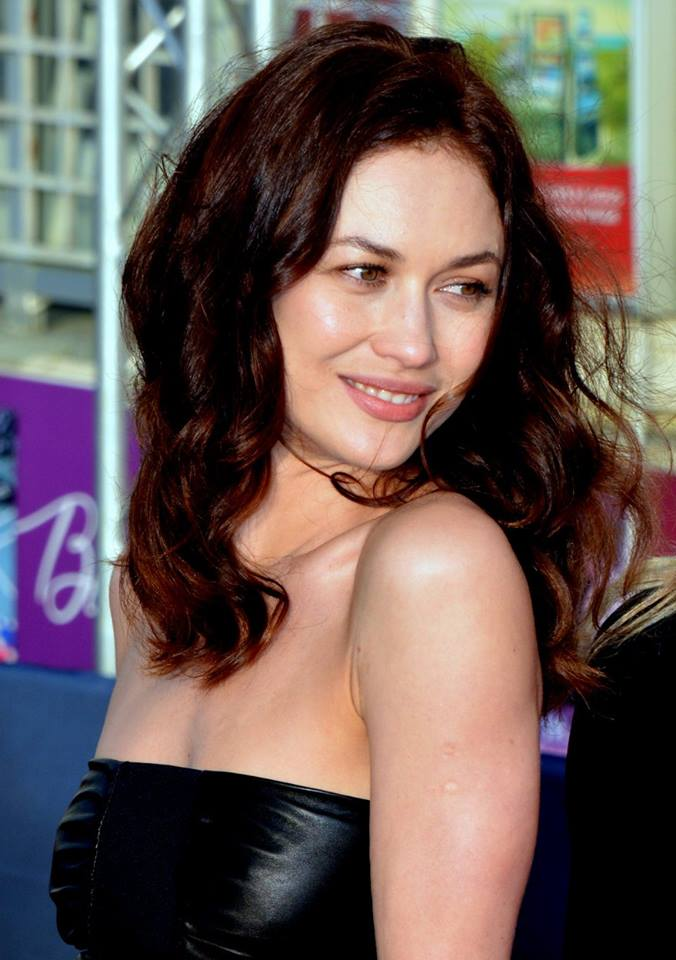
Olga Kurylenko plays Maria Veniaminovna Yudina

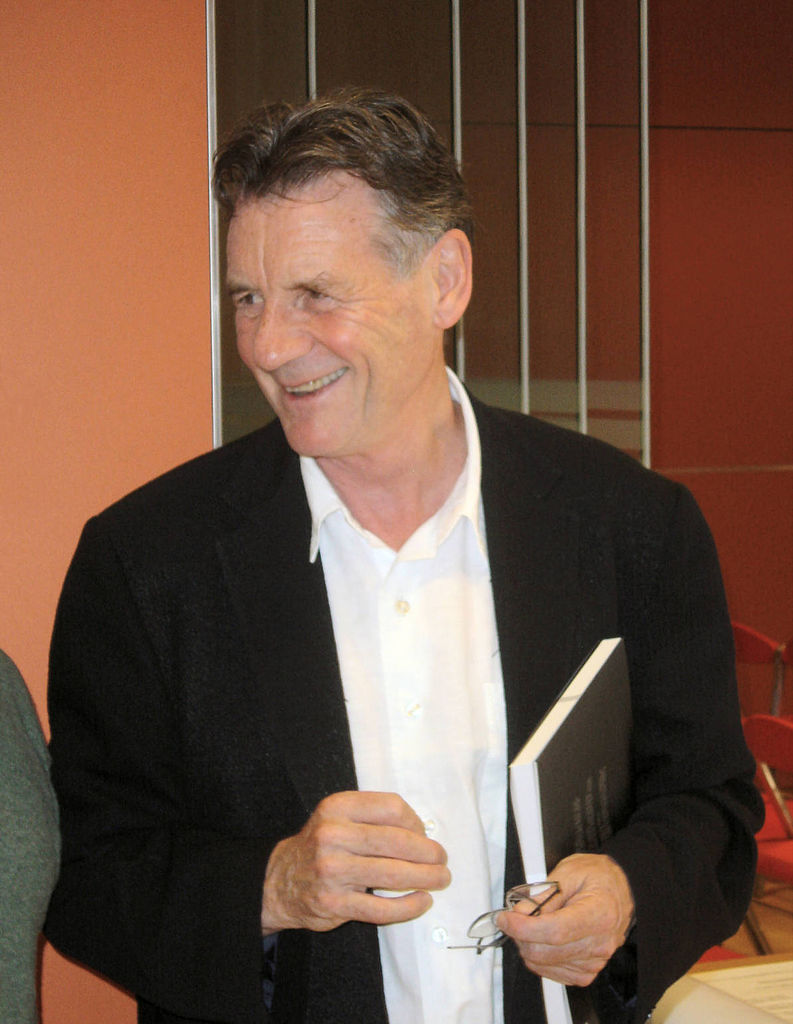
Michael Palin plays Vyacheslav Molotov

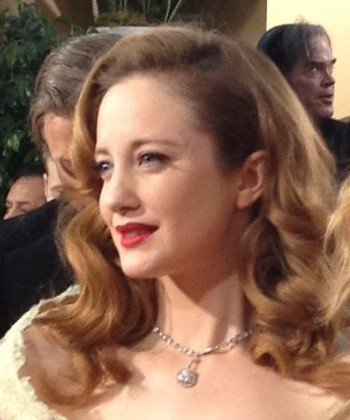
Andrea Riseborough plays Svetlana Stalina

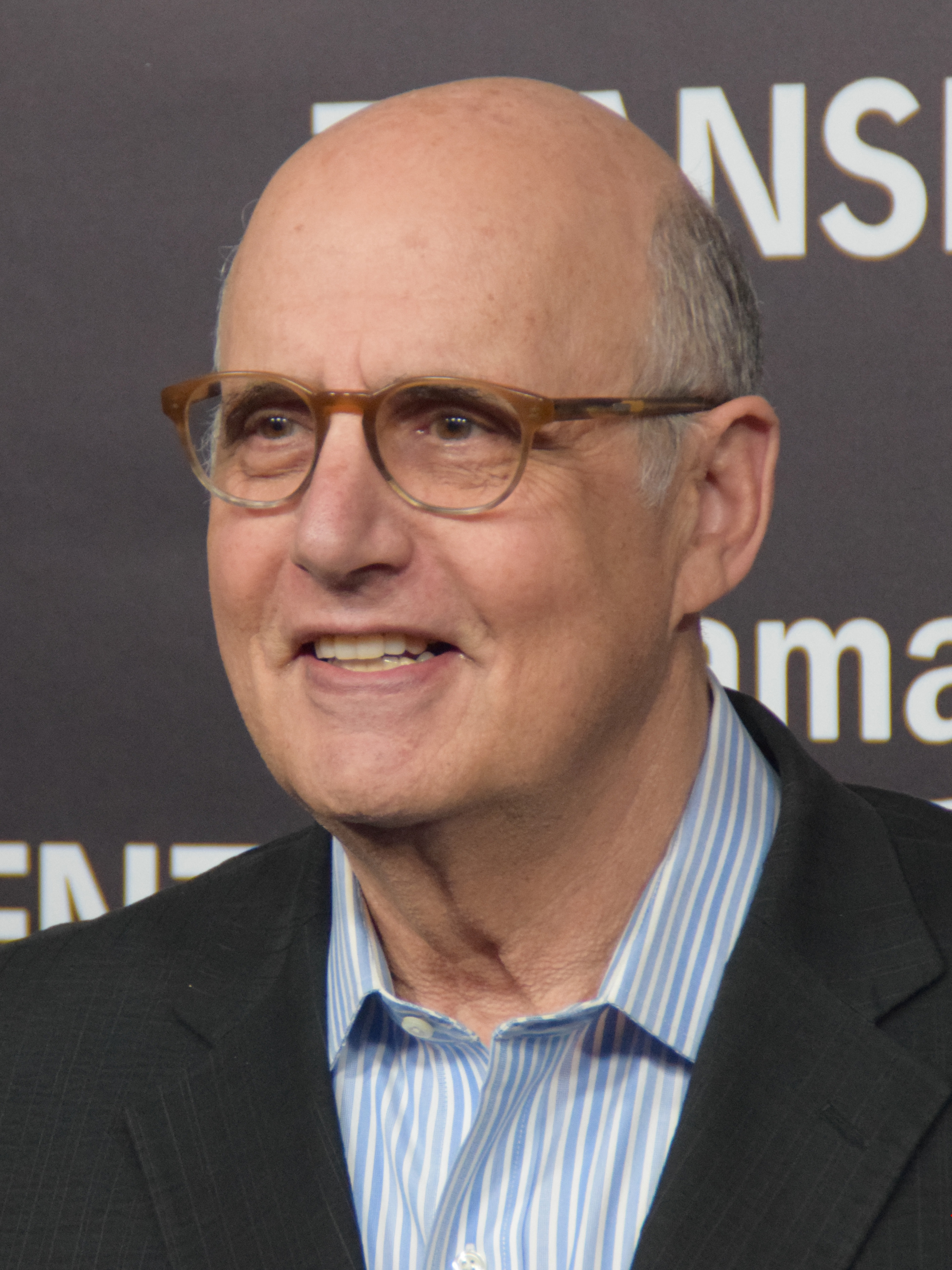
Jeffrey Tambor plays Georgy Malenkov

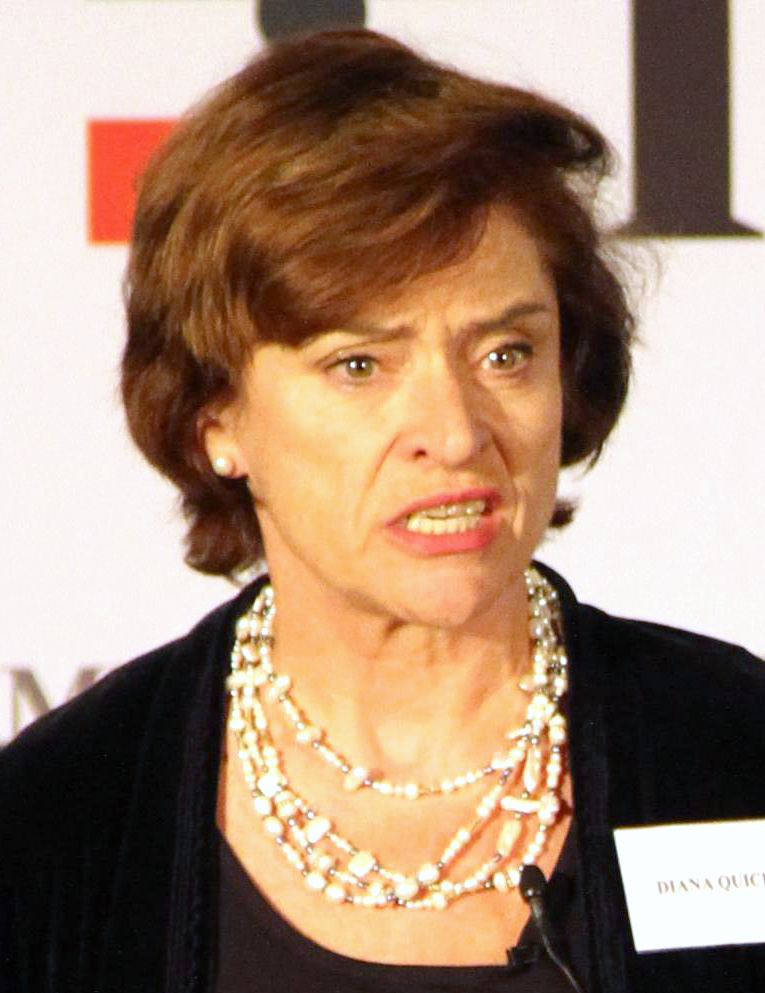
Diana Quick plays Polina Molotova

== Production ==
During the 2016 Cannes Film Festival, it was announced that production on the film was set to begin in June, and that Jeffrey Tambor, Steve Buscemi, Olga Kurylenko, Timothy Dalton, Toby Kebbell, Michael Palin, Simon Russell Beale, Paddy Considine and Andrea Riseborough were in "advanced talks to join the project." By the time filming started on 20 June, Adrian McLoughlin and Paul Whitehouse had joined the cast, and Jason Isaacs had replaced Dalton as Georgy Zhukov, while Rupert Friend had replaced Kebbell as Vasily Stalin. Production wrapped on 6 August 2016.

Scenes were shot on location in Kyiv (exterior scenes and the exteriors of the Public Enemies building and the NKVD building), Moscow (the Red Gate Building), and the United Kingdom (Blythe House, Battersea Park, Mansion House, Fulham Town Hall, Goldsmiths' Hall, Shoreditch Town Hall, Freemasons' Hall, Alexandra Palace, and Hammersmith Town Hall in London, Mongewell Park in Oxfordshire, Black Park in Buckinghamshire, and Wrest Park in Bedfordshire). The film's score was composed by Christopher Willis, who tried to write in the style of Soviet composer Dmitri Shostakovich.

== Release and reception ==
=== Box office ===
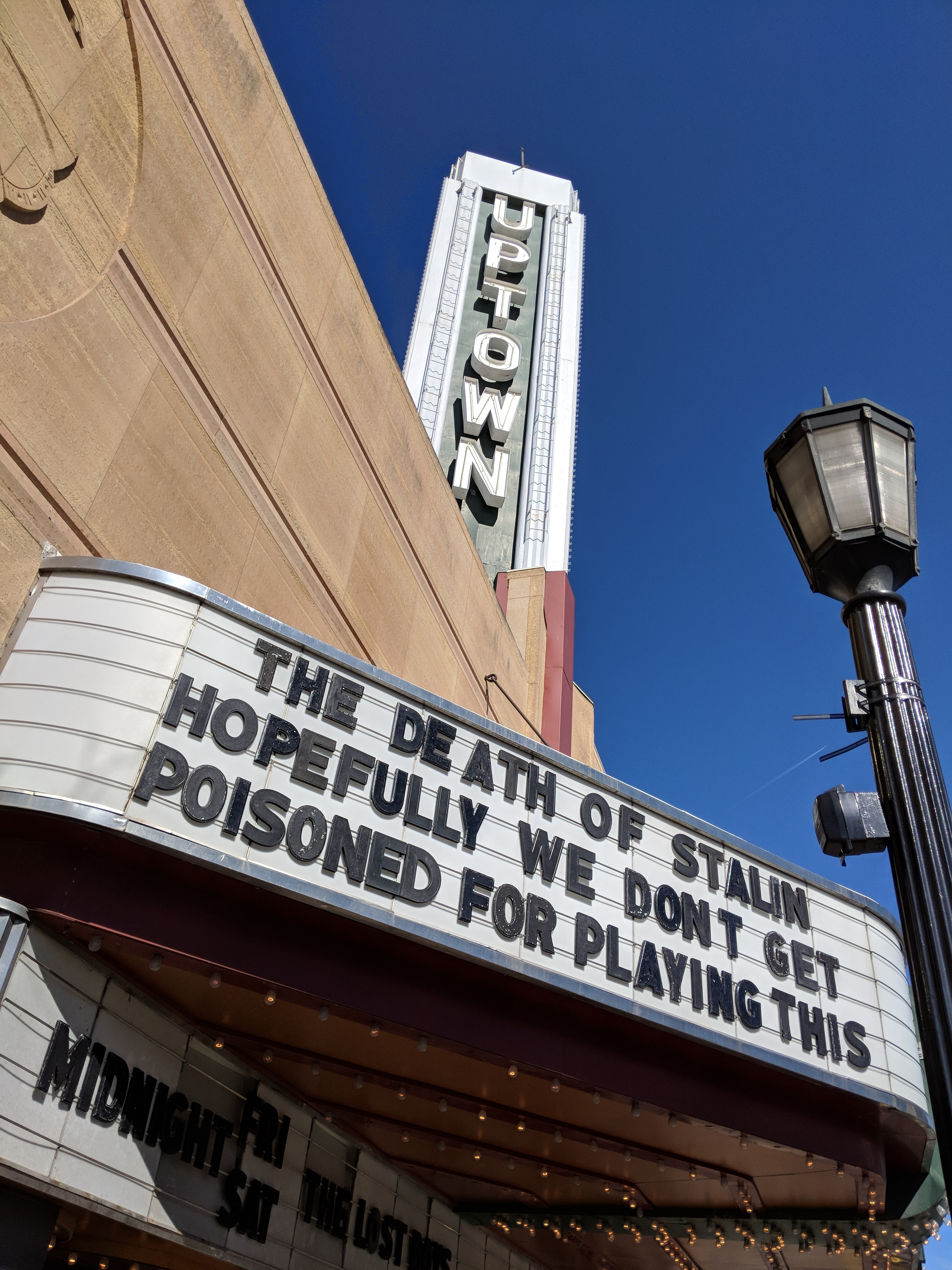
Marquee at the Uptown Theater, Minneapolis for The Death of Stalin

The Death of Stalin was screened in the Platform section at the 2017 Toronto International Film Festival. It was released in theatres by eOne Films in the United Kingdom on 20 October 2017, and by IFC Films in the United States on 9 March 2018. The film grossed $8 million in the United States and Canada and $16.6 million in other territories (including $7.3 million in the UK), for a worldwide box office total of $24.6 million.

=== Critical response ===
On the review aggregator website Rotten Tomatoes, the film holds an approval rating of 94% based on 254 reviews, with an average score of 8/10; the site's critics consensus reads: "The Death of Stalin finds director/co-writer Armando Iannucci in riotous form, bringing his scabrous political humor to bear on a chapter in history with painfully timely parallels." On Metacritic the film has a weighted average score of 88 out of 100 based on 43 critics, indicating "universal acclaim".

Peter Bradshaw of The Guardian gave the film 5/5 stars, writing that "fear rises like gas from a corpse in Armando Iannucci's brilliant horror-satire" and that it "is superbly cast, and acted with icy and ruthless force by an A-list lineup. There are no weak links. Each has a plum role; each squeezes every gorgeous horrible drop." Sandra Hall of The Sydney Morning Herald gave the film 4.5/5 stars, describing it as "a devastatingly funny dissection of power politics, stripping the mystique from it and those who worship it." Donald Clarke of The Irish Times gave the film 4/5 stars, writing that it "starts in a state of mortal panic and continues in that mode towards its inevitably ghastly conclusion".

Tim Robey of The Daily Telegraph also gave the film 4/5 stars, writing: "Depending on your point of view, The Death of Stalin is either a sly, wintry satire on Armando Iannucci's usual theme of squawking political idiocy, or an insidious attempt to destabilise the Russian establishment with relentless dagger-blows." Peter Howell of the Toronto Star gave the film 3.5/4 stars, writing: "Shifting eastwards from the Anglo-American japes of In the Loop and Veep, director/co-writer Armando Iannucci doesn’t stint on brutal truth — or lethal legend."

Christopher Orr of The Atlantic praised the film's humour and performances and wrote that it "seems precisely attuned to the current moment: a capricious, unpredictable leader, basking in a cult of personality; the introduction of 'alternative facts'; the swift, party-wide swerves on subjects as various as negotiating with North Korea, paying off porn stars, and even Russian efforts to subvert a U.S. election." Anthony Lane of The New Yorker wrote that the film was "ten times funnier, by my reckoning, than it has any right to be, and more riddled with risk than anything that Iannucci has done before, because it dares to meet outrage with outrage."

Raphael Abraham of the Financial Times wrote: "As this coven of vampiric apparatchiks feasts on the remains of Stalinism, the unremitting blackness of the situation at times threatens a full comedy eclipse. But the discomfiting balancing act of humour and horror is precisely Iannucci's game—and only he could pull it off with such skill." Thomas Walker, in The Objective Standard, agreed, adding that the film "dives deep into the psychology of those living under such a system and lays bare the self-destructive mind-set of those who grasp wildly for power."

Matthew Norman of the Evening Standard gave the film 3/5 stars, writing: "For all [Iannucci's] dream-team cast and assured direction, despite capturing the laughable sycophancy of the apparatchik the film isn't that funny." Peter Debruge of Variety wrote: "If only the end result were as funny as the idea that anyone would undertake a film about the turmoil surrounding the Soviet despot's demise."

Former U.S. President Barack Obama included The Death of Stalin on a list of his favourite films of 2018.

In 2025, it was one of the films voted for the "Readers' Choice" edition of The New York Times' list of "The 100 Best Movies of the 21st Century," finishing at number 323.

=== Russia and former Soviet bloc ===
Nikolai Starikov, head of the Russian Great Fatherland Party, called The Death of Stalin an "unfriendly act by the British intellectual class", and part of an "anti-Russian information war". In September 2017, the head of the Public Council of the Russian Ministry of Culture said Russian authorities were considering a ban on the film, alleging that it could be part of a "western plot to destabilise Russia by causing rifts in society". Russian online newspaper Vzglyad called the film "a nasty sendup by outsiders who know nothing of our history". The Communist Party of the Russian Federation called the film "revolting", and Alexander Yushchenko, a spokesman for the party, said it was an attempt to spark discontent.

On 23 January 2018, two days before the film's scheduled release in Russia, a screening was attended by State Duma MPs, representatives of the Russian Historical Society, members of the Ministry of Culture's Public Board, and film industry members. Two days later, the Ministry of Culture withdrew the film's distribution certificate. Several cinemas screened the film in late January, and, though they claimed they had not heard the exhibition licence had been revoked, the Ministry sued these theatres.

According to the results of a poll conducted by the state-run Russian Public Opinion Research Center (VTSIOM), 35% of Russians disapproved of the Ministry of Culture's decision to keep the film from Russian screens, while 30% supported the ban and 35% were neutral. 58% of Russians said they would be willing to watch the film in cinemas if the ban were lifted. According to Iannucci, by January 2019, the film had been illegally downloaded 1.5 million times in Russia.

A group of lawyers from Russia's Ministry of Culture; Era Zhukova, the daughter of Marshal Zhukov; cinematographer Nikita Mikhalkov; Vladimir Bortko; and Alexey Levykin, head of the Russian State Historical Museum, petitioned Culture Minister Vladimir Medinsky to withdraw the film's certification, saying: "The Death of Stalin is aimed at inciting hatred and enmity, violating the dignity of the Russian (Soviet) people, promoting ethnic and social inferiority. We are confident that the movie was made to distort our country's past so that the thought of the 1950s Soviet Union makes people feel only terror and disgust." The authors said the film, set to be released on the eve of the 75th anniversary of the end of the Battle of Stalingrad, denigrated the memory of Russian World War II fighters, with the Russian national anthem accompanied by obscene expressions and offensive attitudes, and historically inaccurate decorations.

In addition to Russia, the film was banned in Kazakhstan and Kyrgyzstan. Armenia and Belarus were the only members of the Eurasian Economic Union to allow its release: in Armenia, it premiered in two cinemas in Yerevan on 25 January 2018, while, in Belarus, it premiered after an initial delay. In Kazakhstan, the film was only screened at the Clique Festival.

=== Awards and honours ===
Year	Award	Category	Subject	Result	Ref.
2017	British Academy Film Award	Outstanding British Film	The Death of Stalin	Nominated	
2017	British Academy Film Award	Best Adapted Screenplay	Armando Iannucci, Ian Martin, and David Schneider	Nominated	
2017	British Independent Film Awards	Best British Independent Film	The Death of Stalin	Nominated	
2017	British Independent Film Awards	Best Director	Armando Iannucci	Nominated	
2017	British Independent Film Awards	Best Screenplay	Armando Iannucci, David Schneider, & Ian Martin	Nominated	
2017	British Independent Film Awards	Best Supporting Actor	Simon Russell Beale	Won	
2017	British Independent Film Awards	Best Supporting Actor	Steve Buscemi	Nominated	
2017	British Independent Film Awards	Best Supporting Actress	Andrea Riseborough	Nominated	
2017	British Independent Film Awards	Best Production Design	Cristina Casali	Won	
2017	British Independent Film Awards	Best Costume Design	Suzie Harman	Nominated	
2017	British Independent Film Awards	Best Make Up & Hair Design	Nicole Stafford	Won	
2017	British Independent Film Awards	Best Music	Christopher Willis	Nominated	
2017	British Independent Film Awards	Best Casting	Sarah Crowe	Won	
2017	British Independent Film Awards	Best Editing	Peter Lambert	Nominated	
2017	British Independent Film Awards	Best Effects		Nominated	
2018	European Film Awards	Best Comedy	The Death of Stalin	Won	
2017	Magritte Award	Best Foreign Film	The Death of Stalin	Nominated	

== Historical accuracy ==
Several academics have argued there are historical inaccuracies in The Death of Stalin. Iannucci has said "I'm not saying it's a documentary. It is a fiction, but it's a fiction inspired by the truth of what it must have felt like at the time. My aim is for the audience to feel the sort of low-level anxiety that people must have [experienced] when they just went about their daily lives at the time."

The historian Richard Overy wrote that the film "is littered with historical errors", and called it "entertainment, but poor history". Among his examples are,

- Molotov was not the foreign minister when Stalin died. He had been sacked in 1949, but became foreign minister again in the post-Stalin reshuffle.
- Marshal of the Soviet Union (not Field Marshal) Zhukov was a local field commander when Stalin died, having been exiled to the provinces due to Stalin's paranoid jealousy of him. Zhukov became deputy minister of defence in the post-Stalin government, but he was not the commander of the Soviet Army in March 1953; that position was held by his long-time rival Ivan Konev.
- Khrushchev, not Malenkov, chaired the meeting to reorganise the government after Stalin's death.
- Lazar Kaganovich never served as Minister for Labour in the Soviet Government; he was Commissar of Transport (1935–1937), Heavy Industry (1937–1939), and the Fuel Industry (1939), while also holding roles as a Deputy Premier and Central Committee Secretary.
- Beria was actually arrested three months after Stalin died, not almost simultaneously, and that was precipitated by the East German uprising of 1953, not a fictional massacre of mourners in Moscow, which is based on an incident in which at least 109 people were trampled to death during the funeral. He was executed six months after being arrested. Beria had not been head of the NKVD security forces since 1946.
- Svetlana was not sent to Vienna. She remained in the Soviet Union working as an academic and translator before defecting to America in 1967 and becoming a naturalised citizen of the United States in 1978.
- The scene showing the complete liquidation of the personnel of Stalin's dacha was fictional.

Overy wrote that those killed in the Great Purge or sent to Gulags "deserve a film that treats their history with greater discretion and historical understanding". Iannucci said he "chose to tone down real-life absurdity" to make the work more believable.

The Radio Moscow portion of the film is a retelling of an apocryphal story first recorded in Solomon Volkov's book Testimony (1979), which Volkov claimed were the memoirs of Dmitri Shostakovich. In Testimony, Maria Yudina is awakened in the middle of the night in 1943 or 1944, not 1953, and brought in to record, and the recording brings Stalin to tears, moving him to pay Yudina 20,000 roubles in appreciation. The story served as the loose basis for The Stalin Sonata, a 1989 BBC radio play by David Zane Mairowitz. While, like the film, the original story has Yudina send a letter to Stalin, its contents are different, as she supposedly wrote to thank Stalin for the money, adding that she would donate it to the restoration of a church and would be praying for his sins to be forgiven. While the real Yudina was fired on one occasion for her ideological disagreements with Stalin's regime, her family was not killed.

Dr. Lydia Timashuk is described in the film as a willing accomplice in the Doctors' plot, which is discussed as a past, rather than current, event, and is portrayed as an eager agent in the arrest of Moscow doctors for Stalin's care, who, in a deleted scene, dies in a minefield around Stalin's dacha after her sexual advances to Beria are rejected. In reality, she had no involvement in the events surrounding Stalin's death, and was an unwilling pawn in the Doctors' plot, after which she became embittered by the labels of informer and anti-Semite that followed her until her death in 1983.

Bogdan Kobulov is depicted in the film as being shot dead during Beria's arrest by officers acting under orders given by Zhukov. In reality, he was arrested and killed with Beria months later.

In the film, Vasily Stalin and Anatoly Tarasov are seen at a practice of the Soviet Union national ice hockey team, which has been depleted by a recent plane crash. There really was a plane crash in which 11 players on the VVS Moscow ice hockey team died, and star player Vsevolod Bobrov really did survive because he missed the flight, but the crash happened on 5 January 1950, more than three years before Stalin's death.

The NKVD was superseded by the MGB in 1946, almost seven years before the death of Stalin.

Samuel Goff of the Department of Slavonic Studies at the University of Cambridge, though opining that the film's historical discrepancies could be justified as helping to focus the drama, wrote that turning Beria into "an avatar of the obscenities of the Stalinist state" missed the chance to say "anything about the actual mechanisms of power", and argued that Iannucci's approach to satire was not transferable to something like Stalinism, and the film is "fundamentally ill-equipped to locate the comedy inherent to Stalinism, missing marks it doesn't know it should be aiming for".

On the other hand, historian Sheila Fitzpatrick wrote that "for all its insouciance about details, [the film] captures the essential black comedy of the situation."

== See also ==
- Red Monarch
