= Hélène Vincent =

French actress and stage director (born 1943)

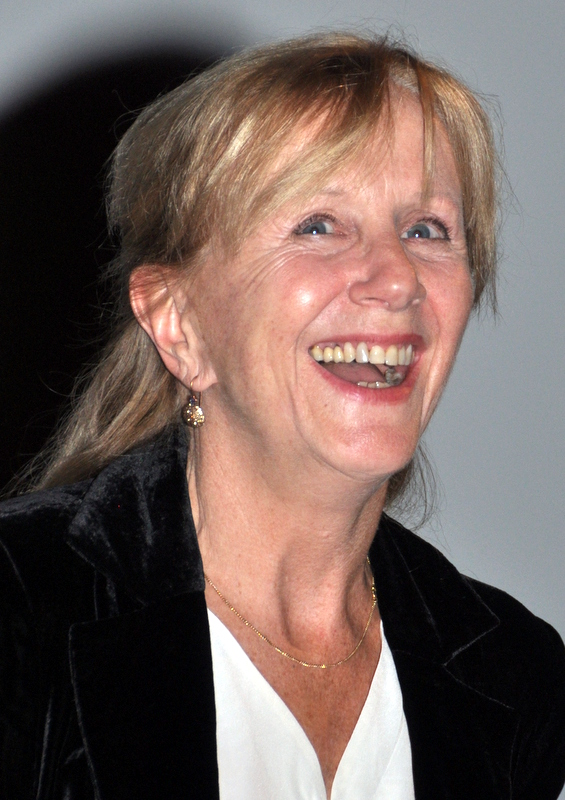
- Hélène Vincent in 2012
- Born: Jocelyne Hélène Nain; 9 September 1943 (age 83); Paris, France
- Occupations: Actress, Stage director
- Years active: 1964 – present

Hélène Vincent (French: [elɛn vɛ̃sɑ̃]; born 9 September 1943) is a French actress and stage director.

== Career ==
She made her on-screen debut in 1969, with the movie Pierre et Paul, directed by René Allio. A couple of years later, she had roles in prominent productions such as Let Joy Reign Supreme directed by Bertrand Tavernier and Fire's Share starring Michel Piccoli.

In 1988 that she gained wider recognition for her role as Madame Marielle Le Quesnoy in the popular success Life Is a Long Quiet River for which she received a César Award for Best Supporting Actress in 1989. In 1992, she was nomninated in the same category for her role in I Don't Kiss, directed by André Téchiné. In 2013, she received a nomination for the César Award for Supporting Actress for her part in the movie A Few Hours of Spring directed by Stéphane Brizé. In 2020, she was nominated for the third time in the category Best Supporting Actress for The Specials, directed by Éric Toledano and Olivier Nakache.

In 1996, she play Bernie's mother in the movie Bernie directed by Albert Dupontel.

In theater, she worked several times with Patrice Chéreau and her ex-husband Jean-Pierre Vincent.

She had been nominated twice for the Molière Award for Best Actress : in 2010 for Alexandra David-Néel, Mon Tibet, directed by Didier Long and in 2011 for La Celestina, directed Christian Schiaretti.

She is the mother of director Thomas Vincent.

== Theater ==
=== As actress ===
Year	Title	Author	Director	Notes
1964	L'Intervention	Victor Hugo	Patrice Chéreau	
1965	Fuenteovejuna	Lope de Vega	Patrice Chéreau	
1966	L'Affaire de la rue de Lourcine	Eugène Marin Labiche	Patrice Chéreau	
1967	Le Voleur de femmes	Guan Hanqing	Patrice Chéreau	
1967–68	The Soldiers	Jakob Lenz	Patrice Chéreau	
1968–69	Le Prix de la révolte au marché noir	Dimítris Dimitriádis	Patrice Chéreau	
1969	Trumpets and Drums	Bertolt Brecht	Jean-Pierre Vincent	
1970–71	Il feudatario	Carlo Goldoni	Jean-Pierre Vincent	
1971	Le Camp du drap d'or	Serge Rezvani	Jean-Pierre Vincent	
1971-72	Capitaine Schelle, Capitaine Eçço	Serge Rezvani	Jean-Pierre Vincent	
1972–73	In the Jungle of Cities	Bertolt Brecht	André Engel, Jean Jourdheuil & Jean-Pierre Vincent	played Marie Garga
1973	En r'venant de l'expo	Jean-Claude Grumberg	Jean-Pierre Vincent	
1974	Dimanche	Michel Deutsch & Dominique Muller	Michel Deutsch & Dominique Muller	
1974	Dom Juan	Molière	Bernard Sobel	played Dona Elvire
1974	La Comtesse d’Escarbagnas	Molière	Marcelle Tassencourt	played Jeannot
1975	En r'venant de l'expo	Jean-Claude Grumberg	Jean-Pierre Vincent	
1975-76	Germinal	Émile Zola	Jean-Pierre Vincent	
1976	Baal	Bertolt Brecht	André Engel	
1977	Vers Bathory	Ludovic Janvier	Pierre Dios	
1978	La Nuit du 13	Sandra Nils	Michel Berto	
1981	La Vierge et le cheval	Marieluise Fleißer	Agnès Laurent	
1981-82	Edward II	Christopher Marlowe	Bernard Sobel	
1982	Schliemann, épisodes ignorés	Bruno Bayen	Bruno Bayen	
1983-84	Bremen Freedom	Rainer Werner Fassbinder	Jean-Louis Hourdin	played Geesche
1984-85	Usinage	Daniel Lemahieu	Claude Yersin	
1986	La Déploration	Eugène Durif	Jeanne Labrune	
1986	Tahafot al Tahafot	Armando Llamas	Jeanne Labrune	
1986	Passions selon Saint-Flour	Arlette Namiand	Jean-Paul Wenzel	
1987	Jours de vogue	Eugène Durif & Marieluise Fleißer	Agnès Laurent	
1987	Desire Under the Elms	Eugene O'Neill	Claudia Morin	
1988	The Father	August Strindberg	Claude Yersin	
1988–89	Retours	Pierre Laville	Patrice Kerbrat	
1990	Le Chant du départ	Ivane Daoudi	Jean-Pierre Vincent	
1991-92	Molly Bloom	James Joyce	Jean-Michel Dupuis	
2008-09	Coriolanus	William Shakespeare	Christian Schiaretti	played Volumnia
2010	Alexandra David-Néel, Mon Tibet	Michel Lengliney	Didier Long	Nominated - Molière Award for Best Actress
2010	Don Quixote	Miguel de Cervantes	Christian Schiaretti	
2011	La Celestina	Fernando de Rojas	Christian Schiaretti	Nominated - Molière Award for Best Actress
2013	Ita L. née Goldfeld	Eric Zanettacci	Julie Lopes-Curval & Hélène Vincent	

=== As director ===
Year	Title	Author
1977	Franziska	Frank Wedekind
1978	La Star des oublis	Ivane Daoudi
1980	Scènes d’exposition	René Escudié
1983	Danton's Death	Georg Büchner
1985-86	La Nuit d'Irlande	Bruno Bayen
1990	A Respectable Wedding	Bertolt Brecht
1992	Double Inconstancy	Pierre de Marivaux
1993	L'Intervention	Victor Hugo
1995	Le Système Ribadier	Georges Feydeau
1997	A Doll's House	Henrik Ibsen
1998	Twelfth Night	William Shakespeare
1999	Some Voices	Joe Penhall
2000-02	M. Malaussène au théâtre	Daniel Pennac
2001	Some Voices	Joe Penhall
2001-02	Scenes from an Execution	Howard Barker
2005	Creditors	August Strindberg
2006	Lucie	John Berger
2007	Vincent in Brixton	Nicholas Wright
2013	Ita L. née Goldfeld	Eric Zanettacci
2018	The Baby Dance	Jane Anderson

== Filmography ==
Key
†	Denotes films that have not yet been released

Year	Title	Role	Director	Notes
1969	Pierre et Paul	Michèle	René Allio	
1972	Les camisards	Catherine de Vergnas	René Allio	
1972	Dimanche volé	Michèle	Gérard Chouchan	TV movie
1974	Un nuage entre les dents	The mother	Marco Pico	
1975	Let Joy Reign Supreme	Madame de Saint-Simon	Bertrand Tavernier	
1977	Au plaisir de Dieu	Hélène	Robert Mazoyer	TV mini-series
1978	Fire's Share	The widow	Étienne Périer	
1978	Seize minutes vingt secondes		Miroslav Sebestik	Short
1978	Les chemins de l'exil	The Countess of Egmont	Claude Goretta	TV movie
1978	Médecins de nuit	Arlette Ménier	Philippe Lefebvre	TV series (1 episode)
1979	West Indies	The social worker	Med Hondo	
1979	L'école est finie	Madame Villebois	Olivier Nolin	
1979	Les dames de la côte	Lucie	Nina Companeez	TV mini-series
1980	Cocktail Molotov	The diplomat's wife	Diane Kurys	
1980	Marie	Agacha	Bernard Sobel	TV movie
1980	La traque	Chenu's wife	Philippe Lefebvre	TV mini-series
1980	Messieurs les jurés	Micheline Saurat	Alain Franck	TV series (1 episode)
1982	Le fleuve étincellant	Lady Sybil Heston	Patrick Bureau	TV movie
1982	Les poneys sauvages		Robert Mazoyer	TV mini-series
1982	Le village sur la colline	Geneviève	Yves Laumet	TV mini-series
1983	Vichy dancing		Léonard Keigel	TV movie
1984	Les amours des années 50		Josée Dayan	TV series (1 episode)
1985	Le deuxième couteau	Arlette Olivier	Josée Dayan	TV movie
1988	Life Is a Long Quiet River	Marielle Le Quesnoy	Étienne Chatiliez	César Award for Best Supporting Actress
1988	Le fardeau		Guillaume Bréaud	Short
1988	Sueurs froides	Jacques's wife	Josée Dayan	TV series (1 episode)
1989	Les Maris, les Femmes, les Amants	Odette	Pascal Thomas	
1989	Les jupons de la révolution	Madame de Noailles	Caroline Huppert	TV series (1 episode)
1990	Dédé	Yvonne	Jean-Louis Benoît	
1990	Le déjeuner de Sousceyrac	Ernstine	Lazare Iglesis	TV movie
1990	S.O.S. disparus		Pierre Boutron	TV series (1 episode)
1991	I Don't Kiss	Evelyne	André Téchiné	Nominated - César Award for Best Supporting Actress
1991	V comme vengeance	Sylvie	Bernard Queysanne	TV series (1 episode)
1992	Le bal des casse-pieds	Marie Paule	Yves Robert	
1992	Des vies séparées		Pascal Bonnelle	Short
1992	Jo et Milou	Sarah	Josée Dayan	TV movie
1993	Three Colors: Blue	The journalist	Krzysztof Kieślowski	
1993	L'instinct de l'ange	Henry's mother	Richard Dembo	
1993	Une journée chez ma mère	Béatrice	Dominique Cheminal	
1994	Des feux mal éteints	Jeanne	Serge Moati	
1994	Simon Tanner	Madame	Joel Jouanneau	TV movie
1995	Tom est tout seul	Tom's mother	Fabien Onteniente	
1995	La Rivière Espérance	Agnès Lombard	Josée Dayan	TV mini-series
1996	Bernie	Madame Clermont	Albert Dupontel	
1996	Lucky Punch	Joséphine	Dominique Ladoge	
1996	Le dernier chant	Louise Favart	Claude Goretta	TV movie
1997	Ma vie en rose	Élisabeth	Alain Berliner	
1997	Les filles du maître de chai	Lucile	François Luciani	TV movie
1998	La fête des mères		Chris Vander Stappen	Short
1998	The Count of Monte Cristo	Heloise De Villefort	Josée Dayan	TV mini-series
1999	Prison à domicile	Norma Klarh	Christophe Jacrot	
2000	Antilles sur Seine	Elizabeth Sauveur	Pascal Légitimus	
2000	Les redoutables	The driver	Guillaume Nicloux	TV series (1 episode)
2001	Family Pack	Esther Kessler	Chris Vander Stappen	
2001	Le soleil au-dessus des nuages	Virginie	Eric Le Roch	
2001	Les alizés	Géraldine Vaneck	Stéphane Kurc	TV movie
2001	La beauté sur la terre	Martine	Antoine Plantevin	TV movie
2001	L'impasse du cachalot	Pamela	Élisabeth Rappeneau	TV movie
2001-03	L'emmerdeuse	Mado Lafarge	Michaël Perrotta	TV series (3 episodes)
2002	Une maison dans la tempête	Véro	Christiane Lehérissey	TV movie
2003	La maison des enfants	Solange Monnier	Aline Issermann	TV mini-series
2004	Le président Ferrare	Denise Chabrier	Alain Nahum	TV series (1 episode)
2005	Saint-Jacques... La Mecque	The sister	Coline Serreau	
2005	The Accursed Kings	Dame Eliabel de Cressay	Josée Dayan	TV mini-series
2005	Le Camarguais	Emma Bosser	Olivier Langlois	TV series (1 episode)
2005	Clara Sheller	JP's mother	Renaud Bertrand	TV series (6 episodes)
2006	Itinéraires	Denise Chartier	Christophe Otzenberger	
2006	Locked Out	Madame Duval	Albert Dupontel	
2006	Les irréductibles	Jane	Renaud Bertrand	
2006	Josephine, Guardian Angel	Geneviève Beaumont	Vincent Monnet	TV series (1 episode)
2008	De nouvelles vies	Françoise	Stéphane Kurc	TV movie
2009	Trésor	Nadine	Claude Berri & François Dupeyron	
2009	Ticket gagnant	Jeanne Vautrin	Julien Weill	TV movie
2009	Mourir d'aimer	The headmaster	Josée Dayan	TV movie
2009	Enquêtes réservées	Madeleine Debost	Patrick Dewolf	TV series (1 episode)
2009	Les Petits Meurtres d'Agatha Christie	Kristin	Stéphane Kappes	TV series (1 episode)
2010	Wandering Streams	Lyse	Pascal Rabaté	
2010	35 kilos d'espoir	Charlotte	Olivier Langlois	TV movie
2010	Fais pas ci, fais pas ça	Marie-Françoise Lepic	Alexandre Pidoux	TV series (1 episode)
2011	La résidence	Odette Node	Laurent Jaoui	TV movie
2011	La loi selon Bartoli	Evelyne Lambert	Charlotte Brandström & François Velle	TV series (1 episode)
2012	A Few Hours of Spring	Yvette Évrard	Stéphane Brizé	Nominated - César Award for Best Actress
2013	Attila Marcel	Aunt Anna	Sylvain Chomet	
2014	Samba	Marcelle	Éric Toledano and Olivier Nakache	
2014	15 francs, des fleurs et une culotte	Anatole's wife	Maud Garnier	Short
2014	La trouvaille de Juliette	The Mole	Jérôme Navarro	TV movie
2015	The Scent of Mandarin	Emilie	Gilles Legrand	
2015	Le premier été	Madeleine	Marion Sarraut	TV movie
2015	Capitaine Marleau	Blanche Muir	Josée Dayan	TV series (1 episode)
2016	Le petit locataire	Mamilette	Nadège Loiseau	
2016	Good Luck Algeria	Françoise	Farid Bentoumi	
2016	L'annonce	Jacqueline	Julie Lopes-Curval	TV movie
2017	Knock	The widow Pons	Lorraine Lévy	
2017	C'est la vie !	Geneviève	Éric Toledano and Olivier Nakache	
2017	Garde alternée	Sandrine's mother	Alexandra Leclère	
2017	Marie-Francine	Annick Legay	Valérie Lemercier	
2018	Looking for Rohmer	Rohmer's mother	Wang Chao	
2018	Du soleil dans mes yeux	Nicole	Nicolas Giraud	
2018	Paris - Pantin	Victoire	Sylvie Audcoeur	Short
2019	The Specials	Hélène	Éric Toledano and Olivier Nakache	Nominated - César Award for Best Supporting Actress
2019	By the Grace of God	Odile Debord	François Ozon	
2019	Noces d'Or	Alix Saint-Cast	Nader T. Homayoun	TV movie
2020	Back Home	Catherine	Jessica Palud	
2020	Adorables	Grandma Rose	Solange Cicurel	
2020	Mine de rien	Thérèse	Mathias Mlekuz	
2020	Murders in Albi	Suzanne Dalmasio	Delphine Lemoine	TV movie
2021	L'origine du monde	Brigitte Bordier	Laurent Lafitte	
2021	Un homme d'honneur	Hélène Berger	Julius Berg	TV mini-series
2023	L'astronaute	Odette Desforges	Nicolas Giraud	
2023	Panda	Thérèse	Nicolas Cuche & Jérémy Mainguy	TV series (4 episodes)
2024	When Fall Is Coming		François Ozon	
2024	Retro Therapy	Yvonne	Elodie Lélu	
