= Yves Pignot =

French actor (born 1946)

- Born: 31 March 1946 (age 80)
- Occupation: Actor
- Years active: 1969-present

Yves Pignot (born 31 March 1946) is a French actor. He appeared in more than one hundred films since 1969.

== Filmography ==
Year	Title	Role	Notes
1969	Clérambard	Chauvieux	
1970	The Lady in the Car with Glasses and a Gun	Baptistin	
1970	Donkey Skin		Uncredited
1973	Elle court, elle court la banlieue	Bus driver	
1977	Pour Clémence	Market vendor	
1978	Vas-y maman		
1980	Voulez-vous un bébé Nobel?	Upper-class man	
1981	Garde à Vue	Policeman	
1981	Beau-père	Minor Role	Uncredited
1981	The Professional	Secret Service agent #4	
1982	Ace of Aces	Lucien	
1986	State of Grace	Eric Buppon	
1994	Asterix Conquers America	Centurion Caius Faipalgugus	Voice, (French Dub)
1995	L'amour conjugal	Bleuzet	
1996	Passage à l'acte		
1996	Bernie	Orphanage director	
1997	Le Déménagement	Motorist	
1999	The Creator	The father	
2003	The Flower of Evil	Pierre Vasseur	
2003	Quand tu descendras du ciel	Mayor	
2003	Fanfan la Tulipe	Guillaume	
2006	Locked Out	Grocer	
2006	Écoute le temps	Garage owner	
2008	Cortex	Loïc Trehouet	
2008	A Day at the Museum	Cashier	
2009	The Horde	René	
2011	L'Élève Ducobu	Minister of Education	
2013	Les jeux des nuages et de la pluie	Theatre director	
2013	Serial Teachers	Monsieur Miranda	
2013	En pays cannibale	Mon adjudant	
2013	Fonzy	Bar owner	
2014	Serial Teachers	Hardware store manager	
2014	40-Love	DIY store manager	
2017	Knock	The mayor	
2017	Épouse-moi mon pote	The mayor	
