= Claude Perron =

French actress (born 1966)

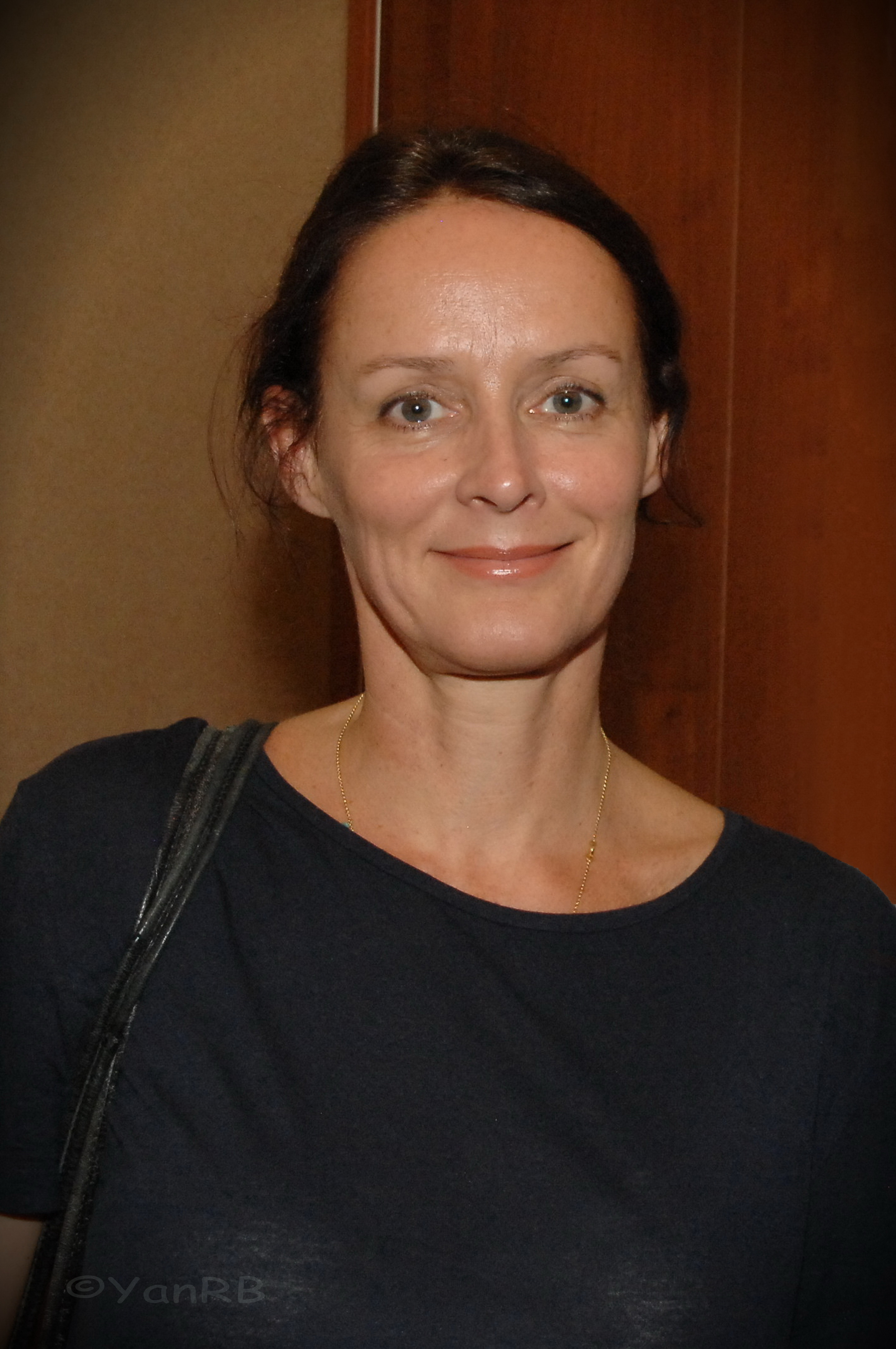
- Perron in 2015
- Born: 23 January 1966 (age 59); Nantes, Loire-Atlantique, France
- Occupation: Actress
- Years active: 1996–present
- Website: www.claudeperron.com

Claude Perron (born 23 January 1966) is a French actress.

== Career ==
Perron appeared in the role of Eva (Nino's colleague) in the 2001 film Amélie, and Marion in the 1996 film Bernie. She also plays in the French TV series WorkinGirls.

== Filmography ==
Year	Title	Role	Director	Notes
1996	Bernie	Marion	Albert Dupontel	
1999	The Creator	Chloé Duval	Albert Dupontel (2)	
1999	Du bleu jusqu'en Amérique	Mlle Guerensky	Sarah Lévy	
1999	Brushing Sue Helen		Hervé Prat	Short
2000	Bellyful	Blanchette	Melvin Van Peebles	
2000	Après la réconciliation	Cathos	Anne-Marie Miéville	
2001	Amélie	Eva	Jean-Pierre Jeunet	
2003	Laisse tes mains sur mes hanches	Nathalie	Chantal Lauby	
2003	Rencontre avec le dragon	Isabelle de Ventadour	Hélène Angel	
2004	Cash Truck	Nicole	Nicolas Boukhrief	
2004	Cause toujours!	Judith	Jeanne Labrune	
2004	Mon ange	Peggy	Serge Frydman	
2004	À boire	Chantal Guibal	Marion Vernoux	
2005	Belhorizon	Anabelle	Inés Rabadán	
2006	Progéniture	The mother	Marie Garel Weiss	Short
2006	Sable noir	Marianne	Eric Valette	TV series (1 episode)
2006	Enfermés dehors	Marie	Albert Dupontel (3)	
2006	Suzanne	Sabine	Viviane Candas	
2007	Chrysalis	Miller	Julien Leclercq	
2007	Autopsy	Anne Mercadier	Jérôme Anger	TV movie
2007	Les cerfs-volants	Mlle Julie / Mme Estherzay	Jérôme Cornuau	TV movie
2007	Nos familles	Paul's adoptive mother	Siegrid Alnoy	TV movie
2008	Cortex	Béatrice Monnier	Nicolas Boukhrief (2)	
2009	La Horde	Aurore	Yannick Dahan & Benjamin Rocher	
2011	Et soudain tout le monde me manque	Suzanne Dhrey	Jennifer Devoldère	
2011	Le repaire de la vouivre	Claire Koenig	Edwin Baily	TV mini-series (3 episodes)
2012	Double mixte	Margaret	Vincent Mariette	Short
2012	Un nuage dans un verre d'eau		Srinath Samarasinghe	
2012	Edwige	Edwige	Mounia Meddour Gens	Short
2012–present	WorkinGirls	Karine Brontier	Sylvain Fusée	TV series (37 episodes)
2013	Vive la France	Used Safely	Michaël Youn	
2013	Zoo	Emmanuelle	Nicolas Pleskof	Short
2013	Les Petits Meurtres d'Agatha Christie	Claude Kerrigan	Eric Woreth	TV series (1 episode)
2014	The Missionaries	Fabienne Lavial	Tonie Marshall	
2014	On a marché sur Bangkok	Dominique Broux	Olivier Baroux	
2015	Belles familles	Fabienne	Jean-Paul Rappeneau	
2015	L'annonce	Nicole	Julie Lopes-Curval	TV movie
2015	Boris Vian fait son cinéma	Juliette	Pablo Larcuen	TV mini-series
2017	Le Brio	The dog woman	Yvan Attal	
2018	Bécassine	Mademoiselle Bongenre	Bruno Podalydès	
2019	Who You Think I Am	Solange	Safy Nebbou	
2020	Villa Caprice	Carole Pertini	Bernard Stora	
2022	Bigbug	Monique	Jean-Pierre Jeunet	Netflix
