= Marthe Keller =

Swiss actress (born 1945)

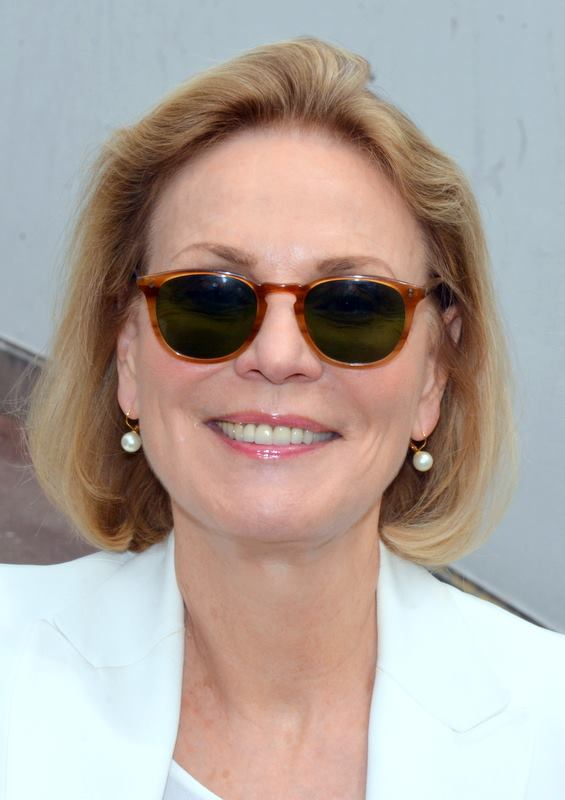
- Keller at the 2016 Cannes Film Festival
- Born: 28 January 1945 (age 81); Basel, Switzerland
- Occupations: Actress; opera director
- Years active: 1964–present
- Partner: Philippe de Broca (1968–1972)
- Children: 1

Marthe Keller (born 28 January 1945) is a Swiss actress. She is perhaps best known for her role in the film Marathon Man (1976), for which she was nominated for a Golden Globe Award.

== Career ==
=== Early years ===
Keller studied ballet as a child, but stopped after a skiing accident at age 16. She changed to acting, and worked in Berlin at the Schiller Theater and the Berliner Ensemble.

=== Film work ===
Keller's earliest film appearances were in Funeral in Berlin (1966, in which she was not credited) and the German film Wilder Reiter GmbH (1967). She appeared in a series of French films in the 1970s, including Un Cave (1971), La Raison du Plus Fou (1973) and Toute Une Vie/And Now My Love (1974). Her most famous American film appearances are her Golden Globe-nominated performance as Dustin Hoffman's girlfriend in Marathon Man (1976) and her performance as a femme fatale Palestinian terrorist who leads an attack on the Super Bowl in Black Sunday (1977). Keller acted alongside Al Pacino in the 1977 romantic drama film Bobby Deerfield, based on Erich Maria Remarque's novel Heaven Has No Favorites, and subsequently the two were involved in a relationship. She also acted alongside William Holden in Billy Wilder's 1978 romantic drama Fedora.

After 1978, Keller did more work in European cinema than in Hollywood. Her later films include Dark Eyes (1987), with Marcello Mastroianni.

In April 2016, she was announced as the president of the jury for the Un Certain Regard section of the 2016 Cannes Film Festival.

=== Theatre work ===
In 2001, Keller appeared in an all-star Broadway adaptation of Abby Mann's play Judgment at Nuremberg, directed by John Tillinger, as Mrs. Bertholt, in the role played by Marlene Dietrich in the 1961 Stanley Kramer film version. She was nominated for a Tony Award as Best Featured Actress for this performance.

=== Opera work ===
In addition to her work in film and theatre, Keller has developed a career in classical music as a speaker and opera director. She has performed the speaking role of Joan of Arc in Arthur Honegger's oratorio Jeanne d'Arc au bûcher on several occasions, with conductors such as Seiji Ozawa and Kurt Masur. She has recorded the role for Deutsche Grammophon with Ozawa (DG 429 412-2). Keller has also recited the spoken part in Igor Stravinsky's Perséphone. She has performed classical music melodramas for speaker and piano in recital. The Swiss composer Michael Jarrell wrote the melodrama Cassandre, after Christa Wolf's novel, for Keller, who performed in the world premiere in 1994.

Keller's first production as an opera director was Dialogues des Carmélites for Opéra national du Rhin in 1999. This production subsequently received a semi-staged performance in London that year. She has also directed Lucia di Lammermoor for Washington National Opera and for Los Angeles Opera. Her directorial debut at the Metropolitan Opera was in a 2004 production of Don Giovanni.

== Personal life ==
Keller has one son, Alexandre (born 1972), from her relationship with director Philippe de Broca. She also dated director Claude Lelouch and actor Al Pacino.

== Filmography ==
=== Theatre ===
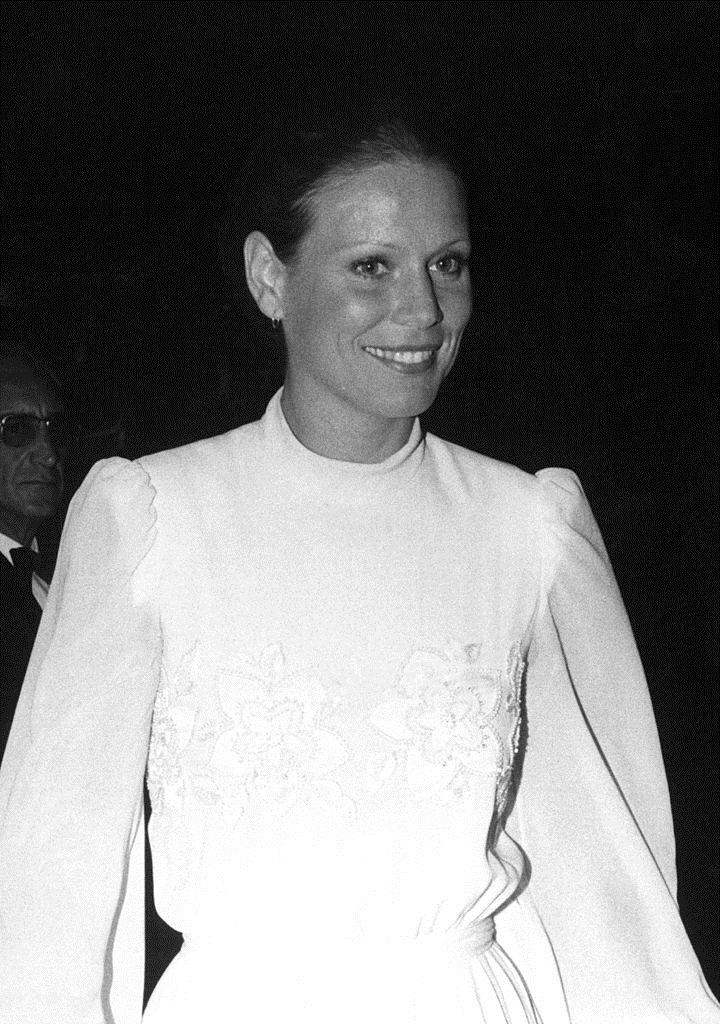
Marthe Keller in Monte Carlo in 1975

Year	Title	Author	Director	Notes
1970	A Day in the Death of Joe Egg	Peter Nichols	Michel Fagadau	Théâtre de la Gaîté-Montparnasse
1979	Three Sisters	Anton Chekhov	Lucian Pintilie	Théâtre de la Ville
1982	Emballage perdu	Vera Feyder	Nelly Borgeaud	Théâtre des Mathurins
1983	Exiles	James Joyce	Andreas Voutsinas	Théâtre Renaud-Barrault
1983-86	Jedermann	Hugo von Hofmannsthal	Ernst Haeussermann & Gernot Friedel	Salzburg Festival
1984	Betrayal	Harold Pinter	Sami Frey	Théâtre des Célestins
1986	Don Carlos	Friedrich Schiller	Michelle Marquais	Théâtre de la Ville
1988	Hamlet	William Shakespeare	Patrice Chéreau	Théâtre Nanterre-Amandiers
1997	Kinkali	Arnaud Bedouet	Philippe Adrien	Théâtre national de la Colline
2001	Judgment at Nuremberg	Abby Mann	John Tillinger	Broadway theatre
2008	The Stronger	August Strindberg	Stephen Wadsworth	Arclight Theatre
2011	Jan Karski (mon nom est une fiction)	Yannick Haenel	Arthur Nauzyciel	Festival d'Avignon
2013	Le Mémorial de l’Église rouge	Khany Hamdaoui & Vincent Prezioso	Vincent Prezioso	Théâtre du Passage (Neuchâtel)

=== Films ===
Year	Title	Role	Director	Notes
1965	Antiquitäten	Young Lady	Marran Gosov	Short
1966	Funeral in Berlin	Brigit	Guy Hamilton	
1967	Wilder Reiter GmbH	The nun	Franz-Josef Spieker	Nominated – German Film Award for Best Performance by an Actress in a Supporting Role
1967	Pfeiffer	Marthe	Marran Gosov (2)	Short
1969	The Devil by the Tail	Amélie	Philippe de Broca	
1970	Les caprices de Marie	Marie Panneton	Philippe de Broca	
1972	The Old Maid	Vicka	Jean-Pierre Blanc	
1972	Un cave	Catherine	Gilles Grangier	
1972	P'pa je serai serrurier	The woman	Ulysse Laugier	Short
1973	Elle court, elle court la banlieue	Marlène Réval	Gérard Pirès	
1973	La raison du plus fou	The hitchhiker	François Reichenbach	
1973	La chute d'un corps	Marthe Renon	Michel Polac	
1974	And Now My Love	Sarah & Rachel Stern	Claude Lelouch	
1974	Only the Wind Knows the Answer	Angela Delpierre	Alfred Vohrer	
1975	Down the Ancient Staircase	Bianca	Mauro Bolognini	
1976	Marathon Man	Elsa Opel	John Schlesinger	Bambi Award for Best Actress – National; Nominated – Golden Globe Award for Best Supporting Actress – Motion Picture
1976	Le guêpier	Melba	Roger Pigaut	
1977	Black Sunday	Dahlia Iyad	John Frankenheimer	
1977	Bobby Deerfield	Lillian	Sydney Pollack	
1978	Fedora	Fedora / Antonia	Billy Wilder	
1980	The Formula	Lisa Spangler	John G. Avildsen	
1981	The Amateur	Elisabeth	Charles Jarrott	Nominated – Genie Award for Best Performance by a Foreign Actress
1983	Der Platzanweiser		Peter Gehrig	
1984	Femmes de personne	Cecile	Christopher Frank	
1985	Red Kiss	Bronka	Véra Belmont	
1985	Joan Lui	Judy Johnson	Adriano Celentano	
1987	Dark Eyes	Tina	Nikita Mikhalkov	Nominated – David di Donatello for Best Supporting Actress
1989	Seven Minutes	Mrs. Wagner	Klaus Maria Brandauer	
1991	Lapse of Memory	Linda Farmer	Patrick Dewolf	
1994	My Friend Max	Catherine Mercier	Michel Brault	
1995	Sostiene Pereira	Mrs. Delgado	Roberto Faenza	
1997	Women	Barbara	Luís Galvão Teles	
1997	K	Nora Winter	Alexandre Arcady	
1997	Nuits blanches	Julia	Sophie Deflandre	
1998	The School of Flesh	Madame Thorpe	Benoît Jacquot	
1999	Le derrière	Christina	Valérie Lemercier	
2002	Time of the Wolf	Rebecca McGregor	Rod Pridy	
2004	Nightsongs	Mother	Romuald Karmakar	
2005	Fragile	Emma	Laurent Nègre	Swiss Film Award for Best Performance in a Supporting Role
2007	Chrysalis	Professor Brügen	Julien Leclercq	
2007	UV	The mother	Gilles Paquet-Brenner	
2008	Cortex	Carole Rothmann	Nicolas Boukhrief	
2008	Bouquet final	Nickye	Michel Delgado	
2010	Hereafter	Dr. Rousseau	Clint Eastwood	
2011	The Giants	Rosa	Bouli Lanners	
2011	My Best Enemy	Hannah Kaufmann	Wolfgang Murnberger	
2012	In a Rush	Mina	Louis-Do de Lencquesaing	
2013	The Mark of the Angels – Miserere	Laura Bernheim	Sylvain White	
2014	Homo Faber (Trois Femmes)	Hanna	Richard Dindo	
2015	Amnesia	Martha Sagell	Barbet Schroeder	
2016	After Love	Christine	Joachim Lafosse	
2017	The Witness	Judge D'Amici	Mitko Panov	
2017	The Escape	Anna	Dominic Savage	
2019	The Staggering Girl	Sofia	Luca Guadagnino	Short film
2023	Mars Express	Beryl (voice)	Jérémie Périn	
2023	One Life	Betty Maxwell	James Hawes	

=== Television ===
Year	Title	Role	Director	Notes
1964	The Trojan War Will Not Take Place	The Peace	Franz Josef Wild	TV Film
1964	His and Hers	Jean	Franz Josef Wild	TV Film
1965	Und nicht mehr Jessica	Jessica Lovell	Falk Harnack	TV Film
1965	Mariana Pineda		Wilm ten Haaf	TV Film
1966	Kein Freibrief für Mord	Christine Foster	Karlheinz Bieber	TV Film
1966	Corinne und der Seebär	Corinne	Thomas Engel	TV Film
1971	Arsène Lupin	Countess Natasha	Jean-Pierre Decourt	3 episodes
1972	La demoiselle d'Avignon	Koba Lye-Lye	Michel Wyn	6 episodes
1975	L'aigle à deux têtes	The Queen	Pierre Cavassilas	TV Film
1982	La certosa di Parma	Gina Sanseverina	Mauro Bolognini (2)	Mini-series
1983	Jedermann	Buhlschaft	C. Rainer Ecke	TV Film
1983	Wagner	Mathilde Wesendonck	Tony Palmer	TV miniseries
1986	Die Frau des Reporters	Esther	Heide Pils	TV Film
1987	The Hospice		Dominique Othenin-Girard	TV Film
1988	Una vittoria	Julie	Luigi Perelli	TV Film
1988	Sueurs froides	Diane	Régis Wargnier	Episode: "Louis-Charles, mon-amour"
1988	La ruelle au clair de lune	Nelly	Édouard Molinaro	TV Film
1989	The Nightmare Years	Tess Shirer	Anthony Page	Mini-series
1991	Young Catherine	Princess Johanna	Michael Anderson	TV Film
1992	Im Kreis der Iris	Marikka	Peter Patzak	TV Film
1992	Turbulences	Hélène	Élisabeth Rappeneau	TV Film
1992	À deux pas du paradis	Eva Grundberg	Michel Vianey	TV Film
1993	Jeanne d'Arc au bûcher	Joan of Arc	Akio Jissoji	TV Film
1993	Liberate mio figlio	Elena	Roberto Malenotti	TV Film
1995	Tödliches Geld	Beatrice Belmont	Detlef Rönfeldt	TV Film
1995	Belle Époque	Antoinette	Gavin Millar	Mini-Series
2001	Tout va bien c'est Noël!	Jacqueline Bréaud	Laurent Dussaux	TV Film
2003	Par amour	Nicole Doucet	Alain Tasma	TV film Biarritz International Festival of Audiovisual – Best Actress; Luchon International Film Festival – Best Actress
2004	La nourrice	Madame Dumayet-Ponti	Renaud Bertrand	TV Film
2007	Dans l'ombre du maître	Maria	David Delrieux	TV Film
2007	Le lien	Eva	Denis Malleval	TV Film
2007	La prophétie d'Avignon	Dona Flores	David Delrieux (2)	Mini-series
2008	Le sanglot des anges	Eléonore	Jacques Otmezguine	Mini-series
2009	Sous un autre jour	Iréne	Alain Tasma (2)	
2011	La résidence	Léa	Laurent Jaoui	TV Film
2011	Page Eight	Leona Chew	David Hare	TV film Nominated – Online Film & Television Association Award for Best Ensemble in a Motion Picture or Miniseries
2014	La vie à l'envers	Nina	Anne Giafferi	TV Film
2017	Sources Vives	Irène Meyer	Bruno Bontzolakis	TV Film
2018	Dévoilées	Isabelle	Jacob Berger	TV Film
2018	The Romanoffs	Anushka	Matthew Weiner	Episode: "The Violet Hour"
2019	Marie Antoinette	Maria Theresa	Pete Travis	TV series
2026–present	Harry Potter	Perenelle Flamel	TBA	TV series; Guest role
