= Nicolas Marié =

French actor and writer

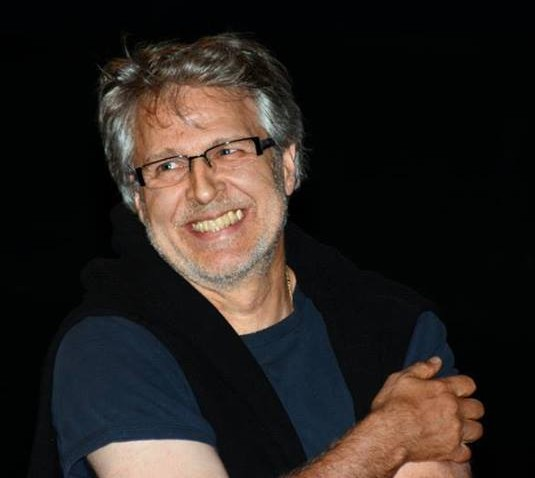
- Nicolas Marié in 2013
- Born: France
- Occupations: Actor, Writer
- Years active: 1976–present

Nicolas Marié is a French actor and writer.

== Theater ==
Year	Title	Author
1976	The Miser	Molière
1976	Les Vacances brouillées	Benjamin Vincent
1977	The Wedding	Anton Tchekhov
1977	Le Jeu de la miséricordieuse	Ariano Suassuna
1978	Of Mice and Men	John Steinbeck
1978	Le Seuil du jardin	Michel Suffran
1979	The Taming of the Shrew	William Shakespeare
1979	La Ronde	Arthur Schnitzler
1979	The Tiger	Murray Schisgal
1980	The Man with the Flower in His Mouth	Luigi Pirandello
1980	Je rêvais peut-être	Luigi Pirandello
1980	La Moscheta	Angelo Beolco
1980	The Typists	Murray Schisgal
1980	Les Vautours	Pierre de Prins
1981	The Lover	Harold Pinter
1981	La Baby-sitter	René de Obaldia
1982	Les Fourberies de Scapin	Molière
1982	Le Sicilien ou L'Amour peintre	Molière
1982	Les Folies amoureuses	Jean-François Regnard
1982	La Centième Nuit	Yukio Mishima
1983	L'Île des esclaves	Pierre de Marivaux
1983	Double Inconstancy	Pierre de Marivaux
1983	The Game of Love and Chance	Pierre de Marivaux
1983	La Surprise de l'amour	Pierre de Marivaux
1983	Arlequin poli par l'amour	Pierre de Marivaux
1984	The Dog in the Manger	Lope de Vega
1984	Chialez sur les idoles	Roger Louret
1984	J'ai 20 ans, je t'emmerde	Roger Louret
1984	Il était une fois la farce	Nicolas Marié
1984	Les 1001 aventures d'Arlequin	Nicolas Marié
1985	I pettegolezzi delle donne	Carlo Goldoni
1985	The Mistress of the Inn	Carlo Goldoni
1985	Permettez, Madame !...	Eugène Labiche
1985	Le Renard et la Grenouille	Sacha Guitry
1986	L'Arlésienne	Alphonse Daudet
1986	Amour et Piano	Georges Feydeau
1986	Mais n'te promène donc pas toute nue !	Georges Feydeau
1987	The Barber of Seville	Pierre Beaumarchais
1987	La Paix chez soi	Georges Courteline
1987	Le Bel Indifférent	Jean Cocteau
1987	Le Jour de congé	Inès Cagnati
1987	Le pédant joué	Cyrano de Bergerac
1988	Guillaume ou les Quatre saisons d'un conquérant	Jean-Pierre Nortel
1989	Ma vie n'est plus un roman	Michel Déon
1991	Rumors	Neil Simon
1995	Arsenic and Old Lace	Joseph Kesselring
1999	Le Mariage forcé	Molière & Jean-Baptiste Lully
2002-05	Rameau's Nephew	Denis Diderot
2006-07	Jacques and his Master	Milan Kundera
2009-10	Rameau's Nephew	Denis Diderot

== Filmography ==
Year	Title	Role	Director	Notes
1989	Le destin du docteur Calvet	Doctor Jean Calvet	Alec Constandinos	TV series
1990	Outremer	Boy	Brigitte Roüan	
1991	Tribunal	Monsieur Beaulieu	Andrée Moracchini	TV series (18 episodes)
1992	Le zèbre	The Moon Clerk	Jean Poiret	
1992	Désiré	The Director	Albert Dupontel	Short
1992	Rumeurs	Pascal	André Flédérick	TV movie
1995	L'image du pouvoir	Michel Losseret	Denis Malleval	Short
1995	Commissaire Moulin	Lawyer Boileau	Yves Rénier	TV series (1 episode)
1996	Bernie	The Commissioner	Albert Dupontel (2)	
1997	Hors limites	President Thiébault	Dennis Berry	TV series (1 episode)
1999	The Creator	Pierre	Albert Dupontel (3)	
1999	Sachs' Disease	The Fireman's Captain	Michel Deville	
2000	Marie-Tempête	The Bank Manager	Denis Malleval (2)	TV movie
2001	Les Cordier, juge et flic	Murat	Christiane Lehérissey	TV series (1 episode)
2001	Xcalibur	Kwodahn	Alan Best, Didier Pourcel, ...	TV series (13 episodes)
2002	Nestor Burma	Jean-François Jourdan	Laurent Carcélès	TV series (1 episode)
2003	Les Thibault	Faisme	Jean-Daniel Verhaeghe	TV mini-series
2004	Cash Truck	The Boss	Nicolas Boukhrief	
2004	Femmes de loi	Professor Alexandre	Denis Malleval (3)	TV series (1 episode)
2004	Julie Lescaut	President Fournier	Luc Goldenberg	TV series (1 episode)
2005	Zim and Co.	Monsieur Rangin	Pierre Jolivet	
2005-07	Alex Santana, négociateur	Claude Liebert	Denis Amar & René Manzor	TV series (4 episodes)
2006	Enfermés dehors	Duval-Riché	Albert Dupontel (4)	
2006	Les innocents	Aubier	Denis Malleval (4)	TV movie
2006	Le maître du Zodiaque	The Cardiologist	Claude-Michel Rome	TV mini-series
2006	Les Bleus	Gilbert Mourier	Alain Tasma	TV series (1 episode)
2006	Joséphine, ange gardien	Xavier Catinel	Philippe Monnier	TV series (1 episode)
2006	Sauveur Giordano	Sagnard	Bertrand Van Effenterre	TV series (1 episode)
2006	Fabien Cosma	Doctor Meynard	Bruno Garcia	TV series (1 episode)
2006	Père et maire	Hervé Bonnal	Gilles Béhat	TV series (1 episode)
2007	99 Francs	Alfred Duler	Jan Kounen	
2007	Le clan Pasquier	Richard Fauvet	Jean-Daniel Verhaeghe (2)	TV mini-series
2008	La très très grande entreprise	Lawyer Dessax	Pierre Jolivet (2)	
2008	Secret Defense	Fouche	Philippe Haïm	
2008	Duval et Moretti	The Prosecutor	Bruno Garcia (2)	TV series (1 episode)
2008	Chez Maupassant	Doctor Barbessol	Denis Malleval (5)	TV series (1 episode)
2008	Les tricheurs	Stanislas Belanger	Laurent Carcélès (2) & Benoît d'Aubert	TV series (2 episodes)
2009	Micmacs	François Marconi	Jean-Pierre Jeunet	
2009	The Villain	Doctor Jean William	Albert Dupontel (5)	
2009	Safari	Monsieur Charles	Olivier Baroux	
2009	Section de recherches	Franck Morier	Gérard Marx	TV series (1 episode)
2009	Vénus & Apollon	Jean Chassarian	Pascal Lahmani	TV series (1 episode)
2010	Gardiens de l'ordre	The Chief Commissioner	Nicolas Boukhrief (2)	
2010	Le village des ombres	Duke of Marrière	Fouad Benhammou	
2010	Second seuil	The Fisherman	Loïc Nicoloff	Short
2010	Un bébé pour mes 40 ans	Béatrice's Boss	Pierre Joassin	TV movie
2011	Café de Flore	Véronique's Father	Jean-Marc Vallée	
2011	You Will Be My Son	The Notary	Gilles Legrand	
2011	Case départ	The Mayor	Lionel Steketee, Fabrice Eboué & Thomas N'Gijol	
2011	Twiggy	The Doctor	Emmanuelle Millet	
2011	Une pure affaire	Philippe Dalambert	Alexandre Coffre	
2011	Chez Maupassant	The Priest	Jacques Santamaria	TV series (1 episode)
2011	Week-end chez les Toquées	Georges de Chanal	Emmanuel Jeaugey	TV series (1 episode)
2012	Mains armées	Michel Thabuy	Pierre Jolivet (3)	
2012	Associés contre le crime	Doctor Nicolas Roscoff	Pascal Thomas	
2012	Un jour mon père viendra	The Comedian	Martin Valente	
2012–present	Les hommes de l'ombre Spin (TV series)	Alain Marjorie	Frédéric Tellier & Jean-Marc Brondolo	TV series (16 episodes)
2013	9 Month Stretch	Attorney Trolos	Albert Dupontel (6)	
2013	L'homme du passé	Edward's Father	Matt Beurois	Short
2013	L'escalier de fer	Doctor Doër	Denis Malleval (6)	TV movie
2013	Alias Caracalla, au coeur de la Résistance	Georges Bidault	Alain Tasma (2)	TV mini-series
2013	Une femme dans la Révolution	Morel	Jean-Daniel Verhaeghe (3)	TV mini-series
2013	VDM	Various	Fouad Benhammou (2)	TV series (1 episode)
2014	Des éclats de verre	Him	Fouad Benhammou (3)	Short
2014	La couille	Guillard	Emmanuel Poulain-Arnaud	Short
2014	Soda : Un trop long week-end	Jean-Jérôme Juhel	Jean-Michel Ben Soussan	TV movie
2015	La nuit est faite pour dormir	Captain Berthier	Adrien Costello	Short
2015	La clinique du docteur H	Serge	Olivier Barma	TV movie
2016	Roommates Wanted	Samuel Edlemann	François Desagnat	
2016	La folle histoire de Max et Léon	Colonel Marchal	Jonathan Barré	
2017	Knock	Doctor Parpalaid	Lorraine Lévy	
2017	Mystère au Louvre	Alfred de Longeville	Léa Fazer	TV film
2023	Second Tour			
2025	Pets on a Train	Rico	Benoît Daffis & Jean-Christian Tassy	

== Dubbing ==
Year	Title	Role	Actor	Director
1987	The Living Daylights	Saunders	Thomas Wheatley	John Glen
1988	Tucker: The Man and His Dream	Kirby	Jay O. Sanders	Francis Ford Coppola
1988	Return of the Killer Tomatoes	Chad Finletter	Anthony Starke	John De Bello
1989	Vampire's Kiss	Peter Leow	Nicolas Cage	Robert Bierman
1990	Fire Birds	Jake Preston	Nicolas Cage	David Green
1990	Pet Sematary	Louis Creed	Dale Midkiff	Mary Lambert
1990	Catchfire	Pinella	John Turturro	Dennis Hopper
1990	RoboCop 2	Mayor Kuzak	Willard E. Pugh	Irvin Kershner
1990	Young Guns II	Deputy Carlyle	Robert Knepper	Geoff Murphy
1991	Delirious	Mickey	Zach Grenier	Tom Mankiewicz
1991	Showdown in Little Tokyo	Johnny Murata	Brandon Lee	Mark L. Lester
1992	Diggstown	Fitz	Oliver Platt	Michael Ritchie
1992	Basic Instinct	Dr. Lamott	Stephen Tobolowsky	Paul Verhoeven
1992	Boomerang	Gerard Jackson	David Alan Grier	Reginald Hudlin
1993	For Love or Money	Julian Russell	Isaac Mizrahi	Barry Sonnenfeld
1993	Ring of Fire II: Blood and Steel	Johnny Woo	Don "The Dragon" Wilson	Richard W. Munchkin
1994	Timecop	Lyle Atwood	Jason Schombing	Peter Hyams
1994	Miracle on 34th Street	Bryan Bedford	Dylan McDermott	Les Mayfield
1995	The Quick and the Dead	The Marshal	Gary Sinise	Sam Raimi
1995	Kiss of Death	Frank Zioli	Stanley Tucci	Barbet Schroeder
1996	The English Patient	Geoffrey Clifton	Colin Firth	Anthony Minghella
1996	Darkman III: Die Darkman Die	Dr. Peyton Westlake	Arnold Vosloo	Bradford May
1997	Red Corner	Ed Pratt	Robert Stanton	Jon Avnet
1997	Money Talks	James Russell	Charlie Sheen	Brett Ratner
1998	Mercury Rising	Dean Crandell	Robert Stanton	Harold Becker
1998	Blues Brothers 2000	Mr. Robertson	Darrell Hammond	John Landis
1998	Paulie	Paulie	John Roberts	John Landis
1998	A Civil Action	William Cheeseman	Bruce Norris	Steven Zaillian
1998	Snake Eyes	Mickey Alter	Chip Zien	Brian De Palma
1998	Armageddon	Colonel William Sharp	William Fichtner	Michael Bay
1998	The Opposite of Sex	Bill Truitt	Martin Donovan	Don Roos
1999	It's the Rage	Warren Harding	Jeff Daniels	James D. Stern
1999	Love Stinks	Seth Winnick	French Stewart	Jeff Franklin
2000	American Psycho	Craig McDermott	Josh Lucas	James D. Stern
2001	The Musketeer	Febre	Tim Roth	Peter Hyams
2001	Hannibal	Benny Holcombe	Don McManus	Ridley Scott
2001	The Others	Mr. Marlish	Keith Allen	Alejandro Amenábar
2001	A Knight's Tale	Geoffrey Chaucer	Paul Bettany	Brian Helgeland
2001	Evelyn	Mr. Wolfe	John Lynch	Bruce Beresford
2002	About Schmidt	Randall Hertzel	Dermot Mulroney	Alexander Payne
2002	The Santa Clause 2	Dr. Neil Miller	Judge Reinhold	Michael Lembeck
2002	Bad Company	Officer Seale	Gabriel Macht	Joel Schumacher
2002	Ali G Indahouse	The Opposition Leader	Craig Crosbie	Mark Mylod
2003	Timeline	Steven Kramer	Matt Craven	Richard Donner
2003	Open Water	Daniel	Daniel Travis	Chris Kentis
2003	Northfork	Happy	Polish brothers	Joel Schumacher
2004	Kinsey	Herman B Wells	Oliver Platt	Bill Condon
2004	Haven	Mr. Allen	Stephen Dillane	Frank E. Flowers
2004	Starsky & Hutch	Kevin Jutsum	Jason Bateman	Todd Phillips
2004	Twisted	Ray Porter	D.W. Moffett	Philip Kaufman
2004	Paycheck	John Wolfe	Colm Feore	John Woo
2004	The Company	Toast Master	Marc Grapey	Robert Altman
2004	Hellboy	Agent Clay	Corey Johnson	Guillermo del Toro
2004	American Crime	Albert Bodine	Cary Elwes	Dan Mintz
2004	Resident Evil: Apocalypse	Major Timothy Cain	Thomas Kretschmann	Alexander Witt
2005	The Ice Harvest	Pete Van Heuten	Oliver Platt	Harold Ramis
2005	Goal !	Glen Foy	Stephen Dillane	Danny Cannon
2005	Miss Congeniality 2: Armed and Fabulous	Tom Abernathy	Stephen Tobolowsky	John Pasquin
2005	Monster-in-Law	Kit	Will Arnett	Robert Luketic
2005	Doom	Sandford Crosby	Ian Hughes	Andrzej Bartkowiak
2005	Melinda and Melinda	Bud Silverglide	Geoffrey Nauffts	Woody Allen
2006	Miami Vice	Agent John Fujima	Ciarán Hinds	Michael Mann
2006	The Queen	Alastair Campbell	Mark Bazeley	Stephen Frears
2006	A Scanner Darkly	The Scientist	Chamblee Ferguson	Richard Linklater
2006	The Good German	Bernie Teitel	Leland Orser	Steven Soderbergh
2006	Little Miss Sunshine	The Medecin / The Undertaker	John Walcutt / Jerry Giles	Jonathan Dayton and Valerie Faris
2007	Goal II: Living the Dream	Glen Foy	Stephen Dillane	Jaume Collet-Serra
2007	The Lookout	Lewis Canfield	Jeff Daniels	Scott Frank
2007	There Will Be Blood	Fletcher Hamilton	Ciarán Hinds	Paul Thomas Anderson
2007	Wild Hogs	Woody Stevens	John Travolta	Walt Becker
2007	Knocked Up	Dr. Pellagrino	Tim Bagley	Judd Apatow
2007	Run Fatboy Run	Gordon	Dylan Moran	David Schwimmer
2007	The Game Plan	Samuel Blake	Robert Torti	Andy Fickman
2007	The Reaping	Doug Blackwell	David Morrissey	Stephen Hopkins
2007	Awake	Doctor Puttnam	Fisher Stevens	Joby Harold
2008	Hancock	Ray Embrey	Jason Bateman	Peter Berg
2008	Semi-Pro	Lou Redwood	Will Arnett	Kent Alterman
2008	Definitely, Maybe	Gareth	Adam Ferrara	Adam Brooks
2008	The Chronicles of Narnia: Prince Caspian	Lord Sopespian	Damián Alcázar	Andrew Adamson
2008	RocknRolla	Bertie	David Bark-Jones	Guy Ritchie
2009	Old Dogs	Charlie Reed	John Travolta	Walt Becker
2009	The Ugly Truth	Larry Williams	John Michael Higgins	Robert Luketic
2009	Transformers: Revenge of the Fallen	Theodore Galloway	John Benjamin Hickey	Michael Bay
2010	Edge of Darkness	Moore	Denis O'Hare	Martin Campbell
2010	Even the Rain	Alberto	Carlos Santos	Icíar Bollaín
2011	The Eagle	Centurion Lutorius	Denis O'Hare	Kevin Macdonald
2011	Sanctum	Crazy George	Daniel Wyllie	Alister Grierson
2011	50/50	Dr. Ross	Andrew Airlie	Jonathan Levine
2011	Moneyball	Mark Shapiro	Reed Diamond	Bennett Miller
2011	Battle: Los Angeles	Lieutenant-Colonel K.N. Ritchie	Rus Blackwell	Jonathan Liebesman
2012	Broken	Archie	Tim Roth	Rufus Norris
2012	The Woman in Black	Jerome	Tim McMullan	James Watkins
2012	Arbitrage	Detective Michael Bryer	Tim Roth	Nicholas Jarecki
2012	Mirror Mirror	Grimm	Danny Woodburn	Tarsem Singh
2012	Salmon Fishing in the Yemen	Tom Price-Williams	Clive Wood	Lasse Hallström
2012	The Dark Knight Rises	The Congressman	Brett Cullen	Christopher Nolan
2012	Abraham Lincoln: Vampire Hunter	Stephen A. Douglas	Alan Tudyk	Timur Bekmambetov
2013	Lincoln	Montgomery Blair	Byron Jennings	Steven Spielberg
2013	Passion	Jack Koch	Max Urlacher	Brian De Palma
2013	Hansel & Gretel: Witch Hunters	Mayor Englemann	Rainer Bock	Tommy Wirkola
2013	The Bay	Dr. Williams	Robert C. Treveiler	Barry Levinson
2013	The Fifth Estate	Alan Rusbridger	Peter Capaldi	Bill Condon
2013	Carrie	Mr. Hargensen	Hart Bochner	Kimberly Peirce
2014	Selma	George Wallace	Tim Roth	Ava DuVernay
2014	Before I Go to Sleep	Ben Lucas	Colin Firth	Rowan Joffé
2014	Foxcatcher	John Eleuthère du Pont	Steve Carell	Bennett Miller
2015	Ant-Man	Howard Stark	John Slattery	Peyton Reed
2015	Ted 2	Shep Wild	John Slattery	Seth MacFarlane
