= Philippe Duquesne =

French actor (born 1965)

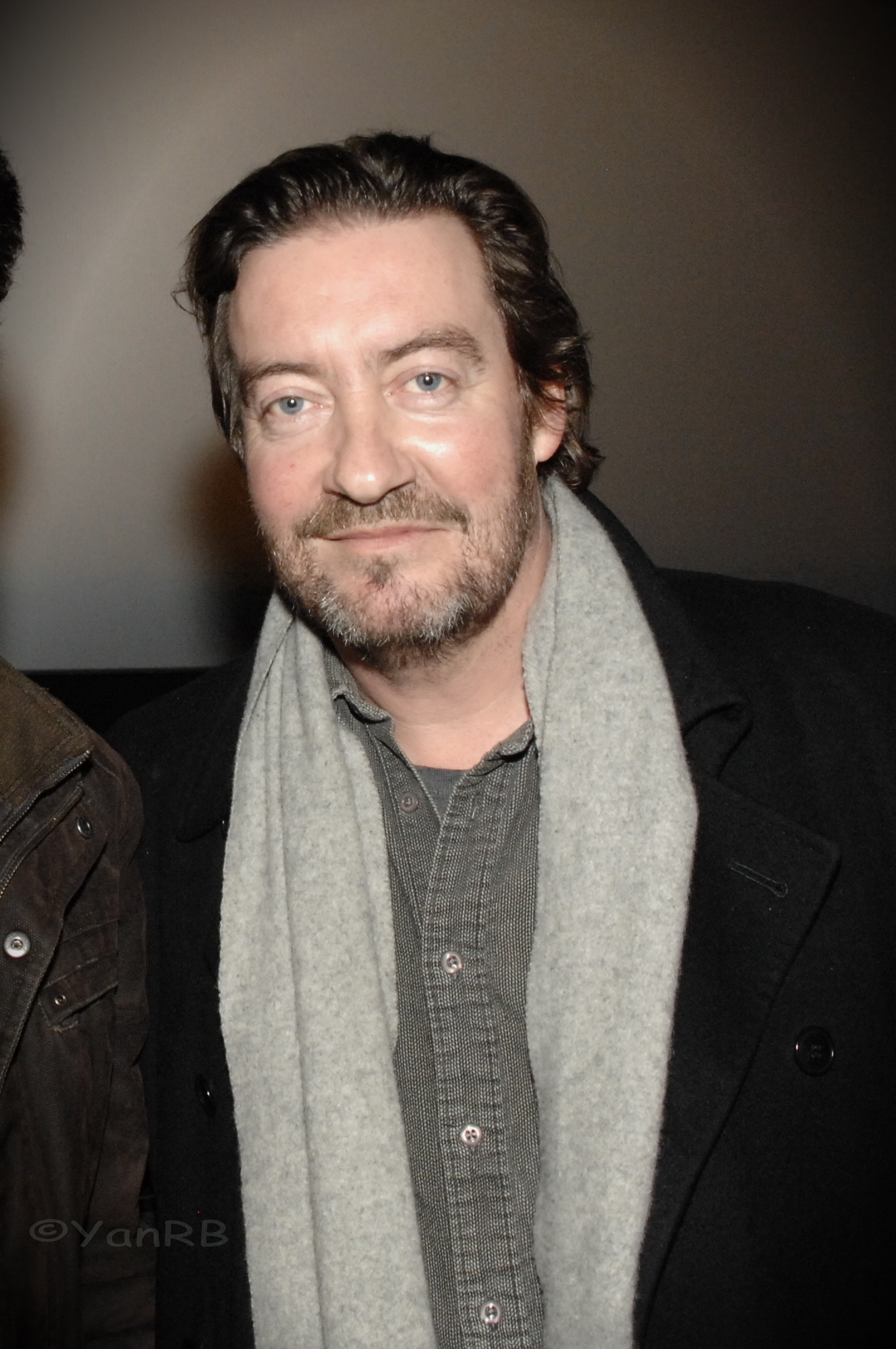
- Philippe Duquesne in 2013
- Occupations: Actor, comedian
- Years active: 1989–present

Philippe Duquesne is a French actor.

== Career ==
In 2004, after the end of the show on Canal+, Yolande Moreau, his partner on screen, hired him in her first film as a director : When the Sea Rises. The movie became a critical success and won the César Award for Best First Feature Film.

In 2008, he starred in the hugely successful Bienvenue chez les Ch'tis, which pays homage to the Nord-Pas-de-Calais region.

He is often cast in Albert Dupontel's movies, like Locked Out in 2006, The Villain in 2009, 9 Month Stretch in 2013, See You Up There in 2017 and his last one Second Tour, released in 2023.

Since 2020, he play the role of Michel Specklin, one of the main characters in the TV series Parlement created by Noé Debré.

== Theater ==
Year	Title	Author	Director
1989–91	Lapin chasseur	Jérôme Deschamps & Macha Makeieff	Jérôme Deschamps & Macha Makeieff
1992–93	Les pieds dans l'eau	Jérôme Deschamps & Macha Makeieff	Jérôme Deschamps & Macha Makeieff
1997	Les Précieuses ridicules	Molière	Jérôme Deschamps & Macha Makeieff
1999–2001	Les Pensionnaires	Jérôme Deschamps	Jérôme Deschamps & Macha Makeieff
2000	Les Précieuses ridicules	Molière	Jérôme Deschamps & Macha Makeieff
2002	Retour définitif et durable de l'être aimé	Olivier Cadiot	Ludovic Lagarde
2003	À la recherche de Mister K.	Maryse Delente	Maryse Delente
2004	The Love of a Good Man	Howard Barker	Jean-Paul Wenzel
2004–05	Fairy Queen	Olivier Cadiot	Ludovic Lagarde
2007–08	Le Médecin malgré lui	Molière	Jean Liermier
2008	L'Hôtel du libre échange	Georges Feydeau	Alain Françon
2009	The Cherry Orchard	Anton Chekhov	Alain Françon
2009–10	Miam Miam	Édouard Baer	Édouard Baer
2010–11	Du mariage au divorce	Georges Feydeau	Alain Françon
2012	à la française !	Édouard Baer	Édouard Baer
2012–14	Par hasard et pas rasé	Philippe Duquesne & Camille Grandville	Camille Grandville
2015	Frangins	Jean-Paul Wenzel	Lou Wenzel
2016	Les Femmes Savantes	Molière	Catherine Hiegel
2017	Les Autres	Jean-Claude Grumberg	Jean-Louis Benoît
2021	Brèves de comptoir, tournée générale !	Jean-Marie Gourio	Jean-Michel Ribes
2022	Waiting for Godot	Samuel Beckett	Alain Françon

== Filmography ==
Year	Title	Role	Director	Notes
1993	Lost in Transit	C.R.S.	Philippe Lioret	
1993	Une journée chez ma mère	The first paramedic	Dominique Cheminal	
1993–2002	Les Deschiens	Philippe	Jérôme Deschamps & Macha Makeïeff	TV series
1994	Aux petits bonheurs		Michel Deville	
1995	Élisa	P.M.U. Owner	Jean Becker	
1995	...à la campagne		Manuel Poirier	
1995	The Apprentices	Man in Flat 48	Pierre Salvadori	
1996	Sélect Hôtel		Laurent Bouhnik	
1997	Ouvrez le chien		Pierre Dugowson	
1997	Le silence de Rak		Christophe Loizillon	
1997	J'ai horreur de l'amour	Inspector	Laurence Ferreira Barbosa	
1998	Folle d'elle	Victor	Jérôme Cornuau	
1999	Lovers	The client	Jean-Marc Barr	
1999	Le bleu des villes	Jean-Paul	Stéphane Brizé	
1999	Marée haute		Caroline Champetier	Short
2000	Sade	Coignard	Benoît Jacquot	
2000	Photo de famille		Xavier Barthélemy	Short
2000	François Kléber	M. Corentin	Patrick Jamain	TV series (1 episode)
2001	Being Light	M. Lamartinier	Pascal Arnold & Jean-Marc Barr	
2002	If I Were a Rich Man	Bergeron	Gérard Bitton & Michel Munz	
2002	The Truth About Charlie	Café Cook	Jonathan Demme	
2002	Maigret	Louis Paumelle	Yves de Chalonge	TV series (1 episode)
2002	Vertiges	Loyal	Jérôme Cornuau	TV series (1 episode)
2002	Avocats & associés	Maurice Malachon	Alexandre Pidoux	TV series (1 episode)
2003	Livraison à domicile	André	Bruno Delahaye	
2003	Motus	Psychiatrist	Laurence Ferreira Barbosa	TV movie
2003	Clémence	Joubert	Pascal Chaumeil	TV movie
2004	Ordo	Mario	Laurence Ferreira Barbosa	
2004	When the Sea Rises	Café owner	Yolande Moreau & Gilles Porte	
2004	A Very Long Engagement	Favart	Jean-Pierre Jeunet	
2004	Passage(s)	The ferryman	Colas & Mathias Rifkiss	Short
2005	Quartier V.I.P.	The prison director	Laurent Firode	
2005	La pomme de Newton	Tony	Laurent Firode	TV movie
2005	Vénus & Apollon		Pascal Lahmani & Tonie Marshall	TV series (1 episode)
2006	Poltergay	Michel	Éric Lavaine	
2006	Locked Out	The Indian	Albert Dupontel	
2006	The Tiger Brigades	Casimir Cagne	Jérôme Cornuau	
2007	Mon homme	The Lieutenant	Ramzi Ben Sliman	Short
2007	Fairy Queen	Gertrude Stein	Christophe Derouet & Ludovic Lagarde	TV movie
2007	Nos familles	Paul	Siegrid Alnoy	TV movie
2007	Maman est folle	Bernard	Jean-Pierre Améris	TV movie
2008	15 ans et demi	Jean-Louis	François Desagnat & Thomas Sorriaux	
2008	Welcome to the Sticks	Fabrice Canoli	Dany Boon	
2008	Par suite d'un arrêt de travail...	Pierrot	Frédéric Andréi	
2008	La mort n'oublie personne	M. Tourbier	Laurent Heynemann	TV movie
2008	Central nuit	Monsieur Vergnolles	Olivier Barma	TV series (1 episode)
2009	The Villain	The redhead painter	Albert Dupontel	
2009	Rose et noir	The Inquisitor	Gérard Jugnot	
2009	La grande vie	Jean-Bernard	Emmanuel Salinger	
2009	Jalousie	The marriage counselor	Bibi Naceri	Short
2009	Rech JF: pour court-métrage rémunéré	Christian Gingerland	Manuel Schapira	Short
2009	Suite noire	The neighbor	Laurent Bouhnik	TV series (1 episode)
2010	La tête ailleurs	Dr. Christophilos	Frédéric Pelle	
2010	Qui a envie d'être aimé ?	The priest	Anne Giafferi	
2010	Gainsbourg: A Heroic Life	Lucky Sarcelles	Joann Sfar	
2010	Je vous aime très beaucoup	The lieutenant	Philippe Locquet	
2010	The Women on the 6th Floor	Gérard	Philippe Le Guay	
2010	Ya basta!		Gustave Kervern & Sébastien Rost	Short
2010	Petites révoltes du milieu	Monsieur Roubit	François Brunet	Short
2010	Big Jim	Bernard	Christian Merret-Palmair	TV movie
2010	La très excellente et divertissante histoire de François Rabelais	Brother Souillard	Hervé Baslé	TV movie
2010	Profilage	Michel Rivière	Eric Summer	TV series (1 episode)
2012	Par amour	Alain	Laurent Firode	
2012	Sexual Chronicles of a French Family	The school director	Pascal Arnold & Jean-Marc Barr	
2012	Les Chiens Verts	Babass	Colas & Mathias Rifkiss	Short
2012	Trafics	Milan Koudelka	Olivier Barma	TV series (6 episodes)
2013	Turf	Fifi	Fabien Onteniente	
2013	Henri	Jean-Lou	Yolande Moreau	
2013	Blanche nuit	Lieutenant Gégé	Fabrice Sébille	
2013	9 Month Stretch	Dr. Toulate	Albert Dupontel	
2013	Chérif	M. Médéros	Julien Zidi	TV series (1 episode)
2014	Calomnies	David	Jean-Pierre Mocky	
2014	Babysitting	Agent Caillaud	Nicolas Benamou & Philippe Lacheau	
2014	Situation amoureuse: C'est compliqué	Armand	Manu Payet & Rodolphe Lauga	
2014	Murders in Rouen	Ludovic	Christian Bonnet	TV movie
2014	Origines	Thierry Joubert	Jérôme Navarro	TV series (1 episode)
2014	Boulevard du Palais	Alexandre / Stéphane	Bruno Garcia	TV series (1 episode)
2015	Chic!	Jean-Guy	Jérôme Cornuau	
2015	Blind Date	Artus	Clovis Cornillac	
2015	Stunned	Georges	Gérard Pautonnier	Short
2015	Son seul		Nina Maini	Short
2015	Le rustre et le juge	Judge Piotr	Jean-Pierre Mocky	Short
2015	Mon cher petit village	Gérard	Gabriel Le Bomin	TV movie
2015	Le mystère du lac	Serge Joufroy	Jérôme Cornuau	TV mini-series
2015	Candice Renoir	Albert Maruval	Nicolas Picard	TV series (3 episodes)
2015	Peplum	Matho	Philippe Lefebvre	TV series (4 episodes)
2016	Paradise	Jules	Andrei Konchalovsky	
2016	Jamais contente	Laurent	Émilie Deleuze	
2016	La folle histoire de Max et Léon	The railroader	Jonathan Barré	
2016	La voix du père	Philou	Colas & Mathias Rifkiss	Short
2016–18	Scènes de ménages	Jean-Pierre	Francis Duquet	TV series (6 episodes)
2017	Alibi.com	Maurice	Philippe Lacheau	
2017	Grand froid	The brother of the dead	Gérard Pautonnier	
2017	Votez pour moi !	Boutriquet	Jean-Pierre Mocky	
2017	See You Up There	The station officer	Albert Dupontel	
2017	Épouse-moi mon pote	Dussart	Tarek Boudali	
2018	Roulez jeunesse	Léo	Julien Guetta	
2018	Naked Normandy	Férol	Philippe Le Guay	
2018	Keep an Eye Out	Champonin	Quentin Dupieux	
2019	Oh Mercy!	Dos Santos	Arnaud Desplechin	
2019	Tout se mérite	Paul	Pierre Amstutz Roch	Short
2019	Une mort sans importance	Franck Largeon	Christian Bonnet	TV movie
2019	Olivia	Blanchot	Thierry Binisti & Octave Raspail	TV mini-series
2019	Capitaine Marleau	Major Fortin	Josée Dayan	TV series (1 episode)
2020	Le lion	The Airfield man	Ludovic Colbeau-Justin	
2020	30 jours max	The doctor	Tarek Boudali	
2020–23	Parlement	Michel Specklin	Jérémie Sein, Émilie Noblet	TV series (23 episodes)
2021	Le Petit Piaf	Hubert	Gérard Jugnot	
2021	La pièce rapportée	Inspector Dalac	Antonin Peretjatko	
2021	La fille dans les bois	Joseph	Marie-Hélène Copti	TV movie
2021	Le bruit des trousseaux	Velterer	Philippe Claudel	TV movie
2022	Le principal	Georges	Chad Chenouga	
2022	L'homme parfait	Pat	Xavier Durringer	
2022	Astrid et Raphaëlle	Boris	Julien Seri	TV series (1 episode)
2023	BAC+12	Mr. Richard	Michel Bulteau	
2023	Alibi.com 2	Maurice	Philippe Lacheau & Marc David	
2023	Second tour	The hacker	Albert Dupontel	
2023	Pour l'honneur	The club president	Philippe Guillard	
2023	La fiancée du poète	Maurice	Yolande Moreau	
2023	La fille d'Albino Rodrigue	Albino Rodrigue	Christine Dory	
2023	Veuillez nous excuser pour la gêne occasionnée	Patrick	Olivier Van Hoofstadt	
2024	Je ne me laisserai plus faire		Gustave Kervern	TV movie Post-Production
