= Second Tour (2023 film) =

2023 French film

- Theatrical release poster
- Directed by: Albert Dupontel
- Written by: Albert Dupontel; Camille Fontaine; Marcia Romano
- Produced by: Catherine Bozorgan
- Starring: Cécile de France; Albert Dupontel; Nicolas Marié
- Cinematography: Julien Poupard
- Edited by: Christophe Pinel
- Music by: Christophe Julien
- Distributed by: Pathé
- Release date: 9 July 2023 (Paris)
- Running time: 95 Minutes
- Country: France
- Language: French

Second Tour is a 2023 French comedy film written, directed, and starring Albert Dupontel, alongside Cécile de France and Nicolas Marié.

== Plot ==
Following a screw-up with an assignment, political journalist Nathalie Pove is demoted to sports journalist, covering soccer news. Then her boss assigns her to cover the second round presidential campaign of Pierre-Henry Mercier, a fiftyish scion of a powerful French family, leading the polls. Pove instantly suspects something is amiss and that Pierre-Henry Mercier is not the political novice he is being presented as. What Pove's determined investigation uncovers is both revealing and hilarious.

== Reviews ==
The critics' opinion of the film was decidedly mixed.

Jacky Bornet at Franceinfo said that with Second Tour "[th]e author-director-performer [Dupontel] rediscovers the verve of his best films in a crisp political-media duo."

Others compared Second Tour to Dupontel's 2020 film Adieu les cons (English: Bye Bye Morons) and think his 2023 Opus falls short. "Second Tour never reaches the subtlety and mastery of the latter [Adieu les Cons], but remains a lovely film, touching and funny, with immense visual ambition. ... This makes it a film not to be missed, but its sometimes disjointed and far-fetched aspect could lose you."

To François Lévesque, "With Second Tour, the usually dark and biting Albert Dupontel offers a surprisingly rosy and toothless political fable. This is because the actor, director and screenwriter tries here to marry two contrary approaches, namely satire and sentimental, without ever succeeding. However, Albert Dupontel knows satire: ... In this area, the filmmaker reached a peak with the remarkable Adieu les cons".

Writing for Le Monde, Jacques Mandelbaum finds a "plot that is too convoluted" and is generally not impressed with "Dupontel's unconvincing entry into politics"
