= Sexual Chronicles of a French Family =

2012 film by Jean-Marc Barr and Pascal Arnold

- Theatrical release poster
- French: Chroniques sexuelles d'une famille d'aujourd'hui
- Directed by: Jean-Marc Barr; Pascal Arnold
- Written by: Pascal Arnold; Translation/adaptation: Lucy Allwood
- Produced by: Pascal Arnold; Teddy Vermeulin; Jean-Marc Barr
- Starring: Mathias Melloul; Valérie Maës; Stephen Hersoen; Leila Denio; Nathan Duval; Yan Brian; Adeline Rebeillard; Grégory Annoni; Laëtitia Favart; Philippe Duquesne
- Cinematography: Jean-Marc Barr
- Edited by: Jean-Marc Barr; Teddy Vermeulin
- Music by: Imaro Quartet
- Production companies: Toloda; Monkey Pack Films; Super Sonic Productions
- Distributed by: Zelig Films Distribution
- Release date: 9 May 2012 (France)
- Running time: Original release: 85 minutes Edited version: 79 minutes
- Country: France
- Language: French

Sexual Chronicles of a French Family (French: Chroniques sexuelles d'une famille d'aujourd'hui, lit. 'Sexual Chronicles of a Family Today') is a 2012 French sex comedy film directed by Jean-Marc Barr and Pascal Arnold.

== Premise ==
After youngest son Romain is caught filming himself masturbating in class, his mother Claire rounds up the family to talk about their sexual experiences.

== Cast ==
- Mathias Melloul as Romain
- Valérie Maës as Claire
- Stephen Hersoen as Hervé, Romain's father and Claire's husband
- Nathan Duval as Pierre, Romain's older brother
- Leila Denio as Marie, Romain and Pierre's adopted sister
- Yan Brian as Michel
- Adeline Rebeillard as Coralie, Romain's friend
- Grégory Annoni as Cédric
- Laëtitia Favart as Nathalie
- Philippe Duquesne as the school director

== Release ==
The original French release contains extremely explicit sex scenes and nudity featuring pornography actress Leïla Denio, Faustine Dubois, Adeline Rebeillard, and Lola Bruna (Mailys Amrous). The version released in North America omits much of the explicit sex and nudity.

== Reception ==
The film received negative reviews, currently holding a 0% rating on review aggregator website Rotten Tomatoes based on 5 reviews, with an average score of 3.1/10. On Metacritic, based on 5 critics, the film has a 34/100 rating, indicating "generally unfavorable reviews".
