= Chrysalis (2007 film) =

2007 French science fiction film

- Theatrical release poster
- Directed by: Julien Leclercq
- Written by: Julien Leclercq; Nicolas Peufaillit; Franck Philippon; Aude Py
- Produced by: Franck Chorot
- Starring: Albert Dupontel; Mélanie Thierry
- Cinematography: Thomas Hardmeier
- Edited by: Thierry Hoss
- Music by: Jean-Jacques Hertz; François Roy
- Production company: Gaumont
- Distributed by: Gaumont Columbia TriStar Films
- Release date: 31 October 2007
- Running time: 91 minutes
- Country: France
- Language: French
- Budget: €8.3 million
- Box office: $1.2 million

Chrysalis is a French science fiction film directed and co-written by Julien Leclercq and starring Albert Dupontel. The film was commercially released in France on 31 October 2007.

== Synopsis ==
In the near future Paris, lieutenant David Hoffman from the European Police is chasing down Bulgarian human trafficker Dimitri Nicolov, along with his police partner and wife, Sarah. During the ensuing shoot-out, Sarah is killed by Nicolov and David is injured. Some time later, David is brought back to active service and given a new partner, Marie, the niece of a high-ranking Intelligence officer. They investigate the body of an illegal immigrant, Tatiana, found with strange marks under her eye from what looks like an eyelid retractor, and her brain cooked by electrical shocks.

In the meantime, a young woman named Manon, who's been involved in a car accident, is being nursed to health at the hi-tech clinic directed by her mother, Professor Brügen. Manon seems to have issues recovering her memories after the incident. She has also the same marks under her eye.

David and Marie manage to link the dead girl to Nicolov, and one of David's informants tell them where to find him, and that Tatiana had a sister named Elena. A stakeout leads to Nicolov's capture, but once at the precinct the criminal attempts to escape and David is forced to kill him to save Marie's life. However, unbeknown to David, the autopsy reveals that the man was not Nicolov at all, but his twin brother. Later at David's apartment, the real Nicolov shows up and kidnaps him. Nicolov brings David to Brügen, who's revealed to be his accomplice. The machine she's using to help Manon recover her memories is a secret military prototype stolen by Nicolov, a technique called "Chrysalis" that allows to digitize and extract a subject's memory, store it away, or erase it completely.

Nicolov forces Brügen to erase David's memory and then he abandons him on the street as a vengeance for the death of his brother. David's found three days later, with no recollection of any event from his past, including Sarah's death, which was haunting him. Marie is tasked by the chief of police Miller, and by her uncle, to babysit David and try to get his memory back by making him relive past traumas, a method that is known to counter the effects of the machine. This kind of traumatic memory is also what's preventing Manon from completing the process, to her mother's increasing chagrin.

Marie disobeys the orders and chooses to bring David back to speed on the Nicolov case. The two of them end put the pieces together and follow the leads to Chrysalis and the clinic. When she sees David, Professor Brügen is worried their operation will be exposed, and orders Nicolov to take care of him. However, in the ensuing confrontation, David ends up killing Nicolov for good.

In the meantime, Manon has found out the real Manon's badly burned body; she never actually recovered from the car crash, and is kept alive only to allow for her memories to be harvested and transferred into Manon's brain. Shocked, she's going to take her own life by jumping from the top of the clinic's building, but David stops her. He tells her he also lost his memories and identity, but he knows who she is: her name is Elena, Tatiana's missing sister: the trauma she was reliving was of being kidnapped as a replacement for Manon, while the drawings she kept making on her notebook were a part of her past identity.

The situation at the clinic escalates when one Intelligence agent shows up and kills both Brügen and what was left of her daughter. Trying to clean up the mess, he attempts to dispatch David and Marie too, but he's overpowered. The two of them find out the agent, and by extension, the Intelligence, was in cahoots with Brügen and Nicolov, who was former agent of the Bulgarian secret service. Marie delivers the file to her uncle, bitterly accepting the inevitable cover-up, but threatening to expose him if any harm should ever incur to her or David. Then she meets with David to say goodbye, as he chose not to restore the painful memories of his old life, and instead to go off the grid with Elena as her protector/father figure.

== Cast ==
- Albert Dupontel as Lieutenant David Hoffman, European Police detective
- Marie Guillard as Marie Becker, David's new partner after Sarah's death
- Marthe Keller as Professor Brügen, director of a state-of-the-art surgery clinic
- Mélanie Thierry as Manon, Professor Brügen's daughter and a patient at the clinic
- Claude Perron as Miller, David and Marie's boss at the European Police
- Alain Figlarz as Dimitri Nicolov, a human trafficker
- Smadi Wolfman as Sarah, David's deceased wife and former partner
- Patrick Bauchau as Charles Becker, Marie's uncle and high-ranked Intelligence officer
- Guy Lecluyse as Kovacs
- Estelle Lefébure as Clara, Manon's nurse at the clinic

== Production ==
Chrysalis is the first feature film directed by French filmmaker Julien Leclercq. The film continues a contemporary cyberpunk trend in French cinema, following Enki Bilal's Immortal (2004) and Christian Volckman's Renaissance (2006), preceding Franck Vestiel's Eden Log (2007) and Marc Caro's Dante 01 (2008). Chrysalis incorporates film noir and is influenced by Franco-Belgian comics. The film is considered a homage to Georges Franju's Eyes Without a Face (1960).

== Release ==
Chrysalis premiered at the French film festival Lille La Nuit on 25 June 2007. The film later screened at the Toronto International Film Festival in September 2007. It was commercially distributed in France on 31 October 2007. It was released on DVD on 9 June 2008.
