= Falcon Express (film) =

- Theatrical release poster
- Directed by: Benoît Daffis; Jean-Christian Tassy
- Written by: David Alaux; Jean-François Tosti; Éric Tosti
- Starring: Damien Ferrette; Hervé Jolly; Kaycie Chase; Frantz Confiac; Emmanuel Garijo; Nicolas Marié; Sébastien Desjours; Stéphane Ronchewski
- Edited by: Hélène Blanchard; Magali Batut; Mathilde De Brancion
- Music by: Le Feste Antonacci
- Production companies: TAT Productions; France 3 Cinéma; Apollo Films; Kinologics
- Distributed by: Apollo Films
- Release dates: 12 June 2025 (Annecy); 2 July 2025 (France)
- Running time: 87 minutes
- Country: France
- Language: French
- Budget: €12.5 million
- Box office: $13.9 million

Falcon Express (released as Pets on a Train in the United States, Australia and United Kingdom) is a 2025 French animated action comedy film produced by TAT Productions and Apollo Films, directed by Benoît Daffis and Jean-Christian Tassy. The film's story follows pets trapped on a speeding train plan to stop plans of Hans, a badger seeking revenge, with the help of Falcon, a raccoon.

The film premiered at the Annecy International Animation Film Festival on 12 June 2025, and was released in France on 2 July 2025. It was later released in the United States on 17 October 2025.

== Plot ==
Falcon is a raccoon who steals food from various bins and carts to feed his friends on the streets, having been 'raised' by Rico, a pigeon, since he was young (although he tells others he was raised by a falcon, as it sounds cooler; and his real name is Maurice, but he prefers to be called Falcon). He accepts an offer from a badger named Hans to collaborate on a train robbery, intending to take the food from the train so that he and his friends can have a Christmas feast. Once on board the train, Falcon can hack into the train carriages and allow Hans remote access. Hans broadcasts a pre-recorded message ordering all humans to leave the train, and then sets it into motion while the only living things on the train are the pets in the final carriage. These include Anna, an anaconda who belongs to a rapper, police dog Rex, Maggie the spotted cat, influencer animals (Candy and Randy), a rabbit couple (Jimi and Janis), a pair of parrots (Croquette / Coco and Judy), a pompous greyhound (Victor), a hamster who lost his mate, a duck, a turtle (Leo), and a clownfish (Momo).

The animals learn that Hans' target is Rex, as Rex was apparently responsible for Hans being sent to the pound after he caught Hans' gang some years ago. Maggie, who regularly travels with her owner Lisa, notes that while the train's final destination would see them crash into another city, they are likely to crash earlier if they pass over a particular bridge, as this bridge cannot cope with the train's current weight and size. She suggests that they can at least successfully cross the bridge if they can get out of the carriage and uncouple the second-class carriages at the train's midpoint. Falcon can release most of the animals from their cages to travel to the other end of the train, apart from a brief accident where the clownfish's travel case is broken, forcing Falcon to leave the clownfish in a toilet until he can prepare a jar of water.

The train rushes through the city, causing collateral damage in the process. It captures the attention of the media, and two reporters, Cynthia and Michael, catch up to the train in their van to try to record any possible activity. The train also suffers internal damage, with the kitchen carriage catching on fire. A propane tank exploded, and some of the animals had to cross to the other side of the carriage. The animals also bond while trying to survive. Cynthia and Michael want to exploit the train's upcoming collision to boost their ratings, having grown tired of reporting boring news. They decide to exploit Lisa's concerns for her cat, Maggie, by covering up the crash under the assumption that she and Maggie will be reunited.

Rico and three rats, whom Falcon refers them as uncles, witness the news, and Rico decides to hitch a ride on a helicopter when the reporters are about to catch footage. As the train reaches Devil's Bridge, Falcon and Rex uncouple the train carts, and Rex manages to jump into the next cart. Still, the carts on the other train dangle when the bridge collapses, yet the train manages to run and carry the dangled carts onto the surface. During the ride, Rex confronts Falcon about being on the train, noting that the food storage was being ruined and destroying the monitor when Hans was about to reveal his accomplice, and the train got hacked. Falcon admits he was the one who gave Hans access to the train and reveals his past, including how he got a cut on his ear from a stay-on tab from a can (he lied earlier about being shot by a bullet), but admits he didn't want anyone to get hurt since he was only going to steal food for his friends. As the animals complain about his deceit, Hans manipulates the controls, causing Falcon to fall out of a hole in the train cart they are currently in.

The animals grieve but keep going, but Falcon survives as he lands on a branch on a cliff, but the branch gives way, causing Falcon to tumble down into a forest. The helicopter catches up to the train, with Cynthia and Lisa observing that Toro City has switched the rails to cause the train to crash in a different location. Rico later finds Falcon and encourages him to make things right after having a heartfelt talk about being proud to have Falcon as his son. Rex and Maggie make it to the control room, but Hans rides a drone to intercept them. Jimi uses Hans's drone to switch the rails, making the train go to Toro City again, and he is saved by the anaconda. Falcon makes it back to the train, using a remote-controlled car to accelerate down a hill after the track curves around a hill, and fights Hans. Cynthia talks to Michael about the ratings after the train crash, and Lisa is crying over the loss of her cat. Hearing this, Lisa takes out the camera's battery.

After Falcon defeats Hans, he pulls the emergency brake, and the train stops, though not without causing more collateral damage in the process. The animals escape safely, Hans is apprehended, and Maggie is reunited with her owner. Cynthia berates the owner and threatens to ruin Lisa, not knowing the latter recorded her and Michael's conversation, which the reporters filmed live, destroying their reputation as they too are also quickly apprehended by the police for fraud. Randy and Candy also got adopted by a fireman since their previous owners were just using them for clout. Falcon parts ways with the pets and walks off with Rico, and Falcon reveals he knows a way to get food from an airport.

In a mid-credits scene, Falcon's three rat uncles are excited to see him arrive home, once more.

== Cast ==
=== Original ===
- Damien Ferrette as Maurice / Falcon, a raccoon
- Hervé Jolly as Rex, a German Shepherd who has a past with Hans.
- Kaycie Chase as Maguy, a cat
- Frantz Confiac as Hans, a badger who is seeking revenge on Rex.
- Emmanuel Garijo as Randy, a chihuahua, and Jimi, a rabbit
- Nicolas Marié as Rico, a pigeon who is Falcon’s adoptive father.
- Stéphane Ronchewski as Victor, a greyhound
- Sébastien Desjours as Croquette, a tonkinese cat

=== English voices ===
- Wyatt Bowen as Maurice / Falcon
  - Bowen also voices Leo, a turtle, and Michael, a reporter
- Tristan D. Lalla as Rex
- Angela Galuppo as Maggie
- Chimwemwe Miller as Hans
- Mark Camacho as Rico
- Daniel Brochu as Randy
- Bruce Dinsmore as Jimi
- Elizabeth Neale as Judy, a parrot
  - Neale also voiced Cynthia, a reporter
- Eleanor Noble as Janis, a rabbit
  - Noble also voices Anna, an anaconda, and Lisa, Maggie's owner
- Terrence Scammell as Victor
  - Scammell also voices the Duck and Javier
- Julian Stamboulieh as Coco, a parrot
- Harry Standjofski as Chuck
- Richard M. Dumont as Momo, a clownfish
- Annakin Slayd as Johnson Pilot
- Patrick Abellard as Johnson Reporter

== Production ==
Production on Falcon Express began on 2020. In the end, the film's production budget was €12.5 million.

== Release ==
Kinology sold the film throughout Europe, United States, South America, South Korea, and Vietnam. On 3 April 2025, Viva Pictures acquired the U.S film distribution rights. The film had its world premiere at the Annecy International Animation Film Festival on 12 June 2025. The film was released in France on 2 July 2025, and was released in the United States on 17 October 2025.
