= 40-Love =

- Directed by: Stéphane Demoustier
- Screenplay by: Stéphane Demoustier; Gaëlle Macé
- Produced by: Frédéric Jouve
- Starring: Olivier Gourmet; Valeria Bruni Tedeschi
- Cinematography: Julien Poupard
- Edited by: Damien Maestraggi
- Release date: 2014
- Language: French

40-Love (French: Terre Battue, lit. 'Clay Court') is a 2014 French-Belgian comedy-drama film co-written and directed by Stéphane Demoustier, in his feature directorial debut. It premiered at the 71st Venice International Film Festival.

== Cast ==
- Olivier Gourmet as Jérôme Sauvage
- Valeria Bruni Tedeschi as Laura Sauvage
- Charles Mérienne as Ugo Sauvage
- Vimala Pons as Sylvie
- Jean-Yves Berteloot as Sardi
- Sam Louwyck as Gerets
- Yves Pignot as the DIY store manager
- Christophe Brault as Darbois
- Husky Kihal as the police lieutenant
- Sandrine Dumas as the policewoman

== Production ==
The film was produced by Les Films Velvet, with Dardenne brothers's Les Films du Fleuve, Année Zéro, Arte France Cinéma and RTBF serving as co-producers. It was shot between May and July 2013 in the Ile-de-France and Nord-Pas-de-Calais regions.

== Release ==
The film premiered at the 71st edition of the Venice Film Festival, in the International Critics' Week sidebar.

It was theatrically released in France on 10 April 2015.

== Reception ==
Variety described the film as "an imperfect debut but a remarkable one nonetheless, liable to bore sensation seekers, while tipping an impressive new talent toward more subtlety-oriented fest auds.". Filmmaker called it "a solid, gripping piece of craft invested in underexplored aspects of the current global marketplace". The Hollywood Reporter described it as "intriguing", "ambitious" and "captivating". Eye For Film's Anne-Katrin Titze wrote: "The direction the action takes is superbly unpredictable and yet completely in line with the characters" and noted: "Not since Alfred Hitchcock's Strangers on a Train has a tennis match created as much suspense as the one in 40-Love".
