= Sachs' Disease =

- Film poster
- Directed by: Michel Deville
- Screenplay by: Michel Deville; Rosalinde Deville
- Based on: La Maladie de Sachs by Martin Winckler
- Produced by: Rosalinde Deville
- Starring: Albert Dupontel
- Cinematography: André Diot
- Edited by: Andrea Sedláčková
- Production companies: Eléfilm; France 2 Cinéma; Renn Productions; Katharina
- Distributed by: Pathé Distribution
- Release date: 22 September 1999
- Running time: 107 minutes
- Country: France
- Language: French
- Budget: $4.8 million
- Box office: $4.1 million

Sachs' Disease (original title: La Maladie de Sachs) is a 1999 French drama film directed by Michel Deville from a novel by Martin Winckler. It won the French Syndicate of Cinema Critics Prix Méliès, and received César nominations for Best Actor, Best Director and Best Original Screenplay or Adaptation.

== Plot ==
Dr. Bruno Sachs, the only medical practitioner in a small French town, seems on the surface to be compassionate and dedicated. However, in private he is not happy in his work and does not like most of his patients, which include a heart patient who refuses life-saving surgery, and a man whose wife wants sex three times a day, the strain of which is causing his body to wear out. To supplement his income, Dr. Sachs performs abortions in a nearby town. Here he meets Pauline Kasser, a young woman, and they are attracted to each other. While she is not interested in a traditional courtship, she would like to consummate their relationship. A few days later she bumps into him in a book shop, and their relationship seems to start to blossom.

== Cast ==
- Albert Dupontel - Doctor Bruno Sachs
- Valérie Dréville - Pauline Kasser
- Dominique Reymond - Madame Leblanc
- Étienne Bierry - M. Renard
- Nathalie Boutefeu - Viviane
- Béatrice Bruno - Angèle Pujade
- Gilles Charmot - Georges
- Christine Brücher - Annie's mother
- Cécile Arnaud - Madame Bailly's neighbor
- Serge Riaboukine - The drunk
- Albert Delpy - The pharmacy client
- Nicolas Marié - The fireman's captain
