= Wrath of Man =

2021 action thriller film directed by Guy Ritchie

- Theatrical release poster
- Directed by: Guy Ritchie
- Screenplay by: Guy Ritchie; Ivan Atkinson; Marn Davies
- Based on: Le Convoyeur by: Nicolas Boukhrief; Éric Besnard
- Produced by: Guy Ritchie; Ivan Atkinson; Bill Block
- Starring: Jason Statham; Holt McCallany; Jeffrey Donovan; Josh Hartnett; Laz Alonso; Raúl Castillo; DeObia Oparei; Eddie Marsan; Scott Eastwood
- Cinematography: Alan Stewart
- Edited by: James Herbert
- Music by: Christopher Benstead
- Production companies: Miramax; Toff Guy Films
- Distributed by: Metro-Goldwyn-Mayer Pictures (through United Artists Releasing; United States); Lionsgate and Prime Video (United Kingdom)
- Release dates: April 22, 2021 (International); May 7, 2021 (United States); December 10, 2021 (United Kingdom)
- Running time: 119 minutes
- Countries: United States; United Kingdom
- Language: English
- Budget: $40 million
- Box office: $104 million

Wrath of Man is a 2021 action thriller film directed by Guy Ritchie, who co-wrote it with Ivan Atkinson and Marn Davies. It is loosely based on the 2004 French film Cash Truck. It is Ritchie's fourth directorial collaboration with lead actor Jason Statham, and the first since Revolver (2005). Holt McCallany, Jeffrey Donovan, Chris Reilly, Josh Hartnett, Laz Alonso, Raúl Castillo, DeObia Oparei, Eddie Marsan, and Scott Eastwood appear in supporting roles. In the film, H (Statham) is a new cash-truck driver in Los Angeles, whose thwarting of a robbery leads to his skillset with guns and mysterious past being questioned.

Wrath of Man was released in several countries on April 22, 2021, and in the United States on May 7. The film grossed $104 million worldwide.

== Plot ==
In Los Angeles, California, a Fortico armored-truck robbery leaves two guards and a bystander dead, which sets off a series of events told in four acts.

A Dark Spirit

Five months after the opening scene's robbery, Patrick Hill joins Fortico Security as an armored truck guard. Hill barely passes firearm training and gets off to a rocky start with his colleagues, though company trainer "Bullet" likes him. During a pickup, Bullet is taken hostage. Hill kills the robbers with expert marksmanship. He is questioned by FBI agents who realize Hill's true identity; their superior, Agent King, tells them to let Hill be, much to their confusion.

Hill receives a dossier of Fortico employee files and an autopsy report from the opening murder. Three months later, Hill and Bullet become targets of a new heist in Chinatown, but the robbers flee at the sight of Hill, seeming to recognize him. Hill's coworkers become suspicious of him.

Scorched Earth

Five months before joining Fortico, on the day of the opening scene's robbery, Hill is with his son Dougie. Revealed to be a thief himself working with a robbery crew, Hill hesitantly agrees to monitor an armored truck's route, leaving Dougie in the car. A different group of robbers hijacks the truck across from Hill's car. Dougie is shot dead; Hill is also shot, though he sees the murderer's face.

Hill wakes up in the hospital. Agent King gives him a list of suspects and agrees to temporarily turn a blind eye, since Hill's work picking off the criminals also helps police. Hill is revealed to be Mason Hargreaves, not just a thief but a notorious crime lord; he is promised that he will be allowed to avenge Dougie's death if he can bring down all of the robbers involved in this attack. Hargreaves and his men kill nearly every thief on King's list without results.

Hargreaves' righthand man Mike warns him that going too far will attract attention and figures that they can't find the culprit because the robbery was an inside job, led by someone within Fortico. Hargreaves thus assumes the identity of Patrick Hill and infiltrates Fortico to find the inside man. It was Hargreaves' own crew who attempted the Chinatown robbery until Mike recognized Hargreaves.

Bad Animals, Bad

Some time before the opening robbery, this time from the hijackers' perspectives: A group of disgruntled Afghanistan veterans – including the volatile Jan and their former sergeant Jackson – decide to become thieves for money. With help from an unidentified Fortico guard who served under Jackson, they pull off an ambitious heist of a Fortico armored truck (the opening scene). Jan is the one who shoots the guards dead, as well as Dougie and Hargreaves.

Liver, Lungs, Spleen & Heart

Five months later, the veterans reunite to steal almost $180 million from the Fortico facility during Black Friday weekend. Bullet reveals to Hargreaves that he is Jackson's inside man. The crew takes the depot hostage and they, including Bullet, slaughter all of the Fortico staff. Hargreaves manages to kill nearly all of the robbery crew in turn before Bullet shoots him. Jan, Jackson, and Bullet survive but in greed, Jan murders Jackson and Bullet, taking the money.

At home, Jan finds a phone in one of the money bags, planted by Hargreaves to track its location. Hargreaves confronts him with Dougie's autopsy report. Dougie was shot in the liver, both lungs, the spleen, and finally, his heart. Hargreaves reciprocates each wound, shooting him in the same areas. Abandoning the money, he tells King his task is done and leaves.

== Cast ==
- Jason Statham as Patrick "H" Hill/Mason Hargreaves, a new guard for Fortico with a mysterious past
- Holt McCallany as Hayden "Bullet" Blair, a Fortico guard
- Scott Eastwood as Jan "Number 1"
- Jeffrey Donovan as Sgt. Jackson Ainsley "Elvis"
- Josh Hartnett as "Boy Sweat" Dave Hancock, a Fortico guard
- Eddie Marsan as Terry, a Fortico manager
- Darrell D'Silva as Mike
- Babs Olusanmokun as Moggy
- Laz Alonso as Carlos "Number 2"
- Raúl Castillo as Sam "Number 3"
- DeObia Oparei as Brad "Number 4"
- Chris Reilly as Tom "Number 5"

In addition, Andy García appears in a cameo role as FBI Agent King, musician Post Malone appears as a truck robber, comedian Rob Delaney also makes an appearance as Fortico's CEO, Blake Halls and Eli Brown appears briefly as Dougie, whose murder sets the plot in motion. Additionally, Alex Ferns, Niamh Algar and Tadhg Murphy appear respectively as Fortico guards "Sticky" John Williams, Dana Curtis, and Shirley Davies.

== Production ==
=== Development ===
In October 2019, Guy Ritchie was announced as writing and directing an English-language remake of the 2004 film Cash Truck, with Jason Statham set to star. Holt McCallany joined later in the month. Filming began in November between Los Angeles and London, with Scott Eastwood, Jeffrey Donovan, Laz Alonso, Josh Hartnett and Niamh Algar added to the cast, and Metro-Goldwyn-Mayer taking on distribution for the U.S., Latin America, Scandinavia, the Philippines and Hong Kong to the film. In January 2020, Raúl Castillo was added to the cast.

Christopher Benstead, who previously worked with the director on The Gentlemen, composed the film score. Sony Classical released the soundtrack on May 7, 2021, coinciding with the film's release.

== Release ==
=== Theatrical and streaming ===
The film was released internationally in several countries, beginning on April 22, 2021, including Russia and Australia. It was later released in the United States on May 7, 2021. The film was originally set for release in the United States on January 15, but was delayed due to the COVID-19 pandemic. It was later rescheduled for April 23, before being delayed two weeks later. The film was released in China on May 10. In the United Kingdom, the film was originally going to be released by the British arm of Lionsgate. The film was ultimately released, though, straight to streaming as an Amazon Exclusive on Prime Video on 10 December 2021.

=== Home media ===
The film was released on Blu-ray and DVD on July 13, 2021, by Warner Bros. Home Entertainment/Studio Distribution Services and MGM Home Entertainment, and was later released on Ultra HD Blu-ray on January 17, 2023, by Shout! Studios. The film was added to Paramount+ on March 23, 2022.

== Reception ==
=== Box office ===
Wrath of Man grossed $27.5 million in the United States and Canada, and $76.5 million in other territories, for a worldwide total of $104 million. In the U.S., the film was released alongside Here Today and made $3 million from 2,875 theaters on its first day of release, including $500,000 from Thursday-night previews. It went on to debut to $8.1 million, topping the box office.

Men made up 60% of the overall audience, with 72% being over the age of 25. In its second weekend the film dropped 55% to $3.7 million, finishing second behind newcomer Spiral. In the film's opening weekend in Australia, it grossed $1.34 million. It also made $201,000 in New Zealand and $3.79 million in Russia. In its third weekend of international release the film made $13.5 million, as well as $18.5 million in its Chinese opening weekend.

=== Critical response ===
On the review aggregator website Rotten Tomatoes, 67% of 256 reviews are positive, with an average rating of 6.2/10. The site's critics consensus reads, "Wrestling just enough stakes out of its thin plot, Wrath of Man sees Guy Ritchie and Jason Statham reunite for a fun, action-packed ride." According to Metacritic, which assigned a weighted average score of 57 out of 100 based on 38 critics, the film received "mixed or average reviews". Audiences polled by CinemaScore gave the film an average grade of "A−" on an A+ to F scale, while PostTrak reported 77% of audience members gave it a positive score, with 57% saying they would definitely recommend it.

Alonso Duralde of the TheWrap wrote: "Ritchie's reunion with leading man Jason Statham delivers the scheming, the shooting, and the swearing that the director's fans have come to expect, by the bucketload." Mae Abdulbaki of Screen Rant gave the film a 3.5 out of 5 stars rating, stating that "the film balances multiple storylines with intense action sequences and, despite pacing issues, packs a major punch that will keep audiences riveted."

Writing for Variety, Peter Debruge said: "A few years ago, when Sam Mendes left the Bond franchise, Ritchie's name was floated as a possible replacement. He didn't take the gig, but Wrath of Man shows that he certainly could have, classing up his signature technique while never quite abandoning the cockney swagger." Richard Roeper of the Chicago Sun-Times gave the film 2 out of 4 stars, writing: "Tired, uninspired and meandering, Wrath of Man is a step backward for Ritchie, a step sideways for the stoic-for-life Jason Statham (reteaming with Ritchie for the first time in 16 years) and a misstep for anyone who invests their time and money on 118 minutes of such convoluted and forgettable nonsense."

Matt Zoller Seitz of RogerEbert.com was enthusiastic, rating it four stars out of four (the highest grade on the site), with him calling it "one of [Guy] Ritchie's best-directed movies – and one of his most surprising, at least in terms of style and tone. Gone is the jumpy, busy, lighthearted, buzzed-bloke-in-a-pub-telling-you-a-tale vibe of film like Snatch, RocknRolla, The Man from U.N.C.L.E., King Arthur: Legend of the Sword, and the like. In its place is voluptuous darkness, so sinister that you may wonder if its main character is the devil himself... This is less of a self-consciously clever Quentin Tarantino-Guy Ritchie maneuver, and more in the poker-faced, un-ironic spirit of classic older films that inspired them, like The Killing and The Killers and Criss Cross," while describing the presentation of Statham's character as similar to those in Clint Eastwood's Western films High Plains Drifter and Pale Rider.
