= Bernie (1996 film) =

1996 film by Albert Dupontel

- Theatrical release poster
- Directed by: Albert Dupontel
- Written by: Albert Dupontel; Gilles Laurent
- Produced by: Philippe Liégeois; Jean-Michel Rey
- Starring: Albert Dupontel; Roland Blanche; Hélène Vincent; Claude Perron
- Cinematography: Guillaume Schiffman
- Edited by: Juliette Welfling
- Music by: Ramon Pipin; Noir Désir
- Distributed by: Rézo Films
- Release date: 27 November 1996 (France)
- Running time: 87 minutes
- Country: France
- Language: French
- Budget: $2.2 million
- Box office: $6.4 million

Bernie is a 1996 French black comedy film directed by and starring Albert Dupontel.

== Plot ==
Bernie Noël has spent his whole life in an orphanage in a Paris suburb. He was found in a garbage can when he was only a few weeks old. His first name comes from the man who found him there (Bernie, the building's janitor), and his last name comes from the time of year when he was found (Noël, "Christmas" in French).

At age 29, Bernie decides to leave the orphanage to explore a world that he knows only through television and what his friends have told him. Left to his own devices, with no social skills and an uncertain grasp of reality, he roams the hostile environment of Paris by night. Bernie goes through several violent, epic misadventures searching for his parents, whom he wants to "save" from an imaginary government conspiracy. Along the way, he enlists the help of Marion, a young woman almost as unhinged as he is.

Unable to process that his parents abandoned him as a baby, Bernie first finds his father, who lives as an alcoholic bum, and then his mother, who has long been estranged from her ex-husband and has built a new life for herself within a bourgeois milieu. He sets out to bring them back together, with catastrophic results.

The neurotic and maladjusted Bernie leaves mischief and mayhem in his wake, leading himself and everyone around him to a dramatic conclusion...

== Cast ==
- Albert Dupontel: Bernie Noël
- Roland Blanche: Donald Willis, Bernie's father
- Lucia Sanchez: Maria
- Paul Le Person: Bernie, the janitor
- Hélène Vincent: Bernie's mother
- Claude Perron: Marion
- Roland Bertin: Ramonda
- Catherine Samie: Granny
- Alain Libolt: Dr. Clermont
- Pascal Ternisien: Edouard Clermont
- Emmanuelle Bougerol: Marie-Solange Clermont
- Philippe Uchan: Vallois
- Nicolas Marié: The Commissioner
- Éric Elmosnino: the salesman
- Antoinette Moya: the real-estate agent
- Michel Vuillermoz: the transvestite
- Loïc Houdré: the dealer
- Yves Pignot: the orphanage's manager

== Nominations ==
The film was nominated for the César Award for Best First Feature Film at the 22nd César Awards.
