= Toute une nuit =

- Directed by: Chantal Akerman
- Written by: Chantal Akerman
- Starring: Aurore Clément; Tchéky Karyo
- Cinematography: Caroline Champetier
- Edited by: Véronique Auricoste; Luc Barnier
- Release date: 1982
- Language: French

Toute une nuit (also known as A Whole Night and All Night Long) is a 1982 Belgian-French drama film written and directed by Chantal Akerman. To celebrate the 30th anniversary of the Teddy Awards, the film was selected to be shown at the 66th Berlin International Film Festival in February 2016.

== Plot ==
During a hot summer night in Brussels, Belgium several people are unable to fall asleep. They go out in the streets and/or visit a bar or a dance club to have some chance encounters that may or not lead to erotic contacts.

== Cast ==
- Aurore Clément
- Tchéky Karyo
- Jan Decorte
- Natalia Akerman
- Véronique Silver
- Samy Szlingerbaum
- Jan Decleir
- Frank Aendenboom
- Christiane Cohendy
- Ingrid De Vos
