= Christiane Cohendy =

French film and theatre actress (1940–2026)

- Born: Christiane Renée Pierrette Cohendy; 11 January 1940; Clermont-Ferrand, France
- Died: 5 June 2026 (aged 86); Paris, France
- Occupation: Actress
- Years active: 1980–2025

Christiane Cohendy (11 January 1940 – 5 June 2026) was a French film and theatre actress. She appeared in more than 30 films from 1980. Cohendy died in Paris on 5 June 2026, at the age of 86.

== Selected filmography ==
Film
Year	Title	Role	Notes
1982	The Passerby	Helene	
1982	Toute une nuit		
1995	The Horseman on the Roof		
1999	The Bridge	Gaby	
1999	The Creator		
2000	Salsa		
2001	Read My Lips	Mathilde	

== Awards ==
- Molière Award for best actress (1996)
