= Knock (2017 film) =

Dr. Knock
- Directed by: Lorraine Lévy
- Written by: Lorraine Lévy
- Based on: Knock by Jules Romains
- Produced by: Olivier Delbosc; Marc Missonnier
- Starring: Omar Sy; Alex Lutz; Ana Girardot; Sabine Azéma; Pascal Elbé; Audrey Dana
- Cinematography: Emmanuel Soyer
- Edited by: Sylvie Gadmer
- Music by: Cyrille Aufort
- Production companies: Curiosa Films; Moana Films; Mars Films; Versus Production; France 2 Cinéma; France 3 Cinéma
- Distributed by: Mars Distribution (France)
- Release date: 18 October 2017
- Running time: 113 minutes
- Countries: France; Belgium
- Language: French
- Budget: $13.8 million
- Box office: $5.4 million

Dr. Knock (original title: Knock) is a 2017 French comedy film directed and adapted by Lorraine Lévy and starring Omar Sy. It is a remake of 1951's Dr. Knock directed by Guy Lefranc.

== Premise ==
Dr. Knock is a thug and con man who goes to the small village of Saint-Maurice, where he plans to convince everyone that they are sick and only he can cure them. However, his past catches up with him.

== Cast ==
- Omar Sy as Knock
- Alex Lutz as Lupus
- Ana Girardot as Adèle
- Sabine Azéma as La Cuq
- Pascal Elbé as Lansky
- Audrey Dana as Madame Mousquet
- Michel Vuillermoz as Monsieur Mousquet
- Christian Hecq as The postman
- Hélène Vincent as The widow Pons
- Andréa Ferréol as Madame Rémy
- Rufus as The old Jules
- Nicolas Marié as Doctor Parpalaid
- Yves Pignot as The mayor
- Patrick Descamps as The captain
- Laura Benson as the English passenger
