= La folle histoire de Max et Léon =

- Directed by: Jonathan Barré
- Written by: Jonathan Barré; Grégoire Ludig; David Marsais
- Produced by: Alain Goldman; Christopher Lambert
- Starring: Grégoire Ludig; David Marsais
- Cinematography: Sascha Wernik
- Production companies: Légende Films; Blagbuster Production
- Distributed by: StudioCanal
- Release date: 1 November 2016
- Running time: 98 minutes
- Countries: France; Belgium
- Languages: French; English; Arabic
- Budget: €11.5 million
- Box office: $9.4 million

La folle histoire de Max et Léon is a 2016 French World War II comedy film directed by Jonathan Barré, written by Barré, and the two stars of the film, the comedy team of Grégoire Ludig and David Marsais known as "Palmashow". The film was produced by Alain Goldman and Christopher Lambert who has a cameo as a French Army Captain.

== Plot ==
The war has broken out and Max and Leo have to commit themselves, like thousands of young people in 1939. And if at first they do not realize the consequences of such a mission, they will soon discover that war Is not a matter to be taken lightly. And when defeat strikes, it's even less pleasing. Max and Leon have only one idea in mind: to go home as soon as possible and at all costs. But it is not counting the forces and the men who are in command and who do not intend to let them go like that.

During the Battle of France the pair impersonate Germans and later two French Captains that lead them to England where they join the Free French Forces. The pair are sent as secret agents to the French Mandate for Syria and the Lebanon that leads them to be captured and returned to Occupied France. After meeting several of their old comrades in arms including their sergeant who has turned traitor they escape to Vichy France and work simultaneously for the French Forces of the Interior and the Vichy Ministry of Propaganda after the German Occupation of Vichy.

== Reception ==
Les Inrockuptibles reviewed the film, the first feature film from comedy duo Palmashow, as an "ambitious but alas weak transfer to the big screen."

== Cast ==
- David Marsais as Max
- Grégoire Ludig as Léon
- Alice Vial as Alice Marchal
- Saskia de Melo Dillais as Sarah
- Dominique Pinon as Michel
- Bernard Farcy as Célestin
- Catherine Hosmalin as Madame Dormeuil
- Julien Pestel as Pichon
- Nicolas Maury as Eugène
- Nicolas Marié as Colonel Marchal
- Christopher Lambert as Captain Lassard
- Kyan Khojandi as Commandant Poulain
- Jonathan Cohen as Commandant Beaulieu
- Baptiste Lecaplain as A soldier
- Kad Merad as The actor
- Pascale Arbillot as The actress
- Florence Foresti as A resistant
- Alban Lenoir as A resistant
- Simon Astier as A resistant
- Dominique Besnehard as The medecin
- Philippe Duquesne as The railroader
- Fatsah Bouyahmed as Billal
- Bruno Wolkowitch as The fatalist
