= Louis-Joseph Janvier =

Haitian journalist, diplomat and novelist

- Born: Jean Baptiste Louis Janvier; 7 May 1855; Port au Prince, Haiti
- Died: 24 March 1911 (aged 55); Paris, France
- Occupations: Novelist; Journalist; Diplomat

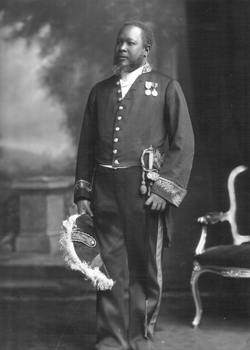

Louis-Joseph Janvier (French pronunciation: [lwi ʒozɛf ʒɑ̃vje]; May 7, 1855 – 24 March 1911, registered as Jean Baptiste Louis Janvier) was a Haitian journalist, diplomat and novelist, who also served as Haitian Minister Resident in London from 1894–1903.

== Biography ==
Louis-Joseph Janvier was born in Port-au-Prince, Haiti on 7 March 1855, one of many children of Joseph Janvier and Louisine Fort.

He attended medical school in Haiti before moving to France to finish his education, and received a doctorate in medicine there in 1881. He also earned a law license and degrees in administration, economics, finance, and diplomacy.

While in Paris, Janvier became interested in journalism and wrote several articles, such as "La République d'Haïti et ses Visiteurs", "Haïti aux Haïtiens", and "L'Egalité des Races." He also wrote several novels about Haitian life.

In 1897 he married Brighton-born Jane Maria Windsor (1869-1908) and had at least two children. His daughter Amelie Alexina Janvier (born in Haiti in 1908) was mother to the French writer and poet Ludovic Janvier.

He remained in Europe for twenty-eight years, returning to Haiti once before dying in Paris at age fifty-five.

== Selected works ==
- "La République d'Haïti et ses Visiteurs" (1883) – article, English: "The Republic of Haiti and Its Visitors"
- "L'Egalité des Races" (1884) – article, English: "The Equality of Races"
- "Haïti aux Haïtiens" (1884) – article, English: "Haiti for the Haitians"
- "Les Affaires d'Haiti" (1885) – historical article
- Les Constitutions d'Haïti (1886) – English: The Constitutions of Haiti
- Le Vieux Piquet (1888) – novel
- Une Chercheuse (1889) – novel
- Elections Legislatives de 1908 (1908) in the Digital Library of the Caribbean
