= The Villain (2009 film) =

- Film poster
- French: Le Vilain
- Directed by: Albert Dupontel
- Written by: Albert Dupontel; Simon Moutairou; Diane Clavier
- Starring: Catherine Frot; Albert Dupontel
- Cinematography: Pierre-Yves Bastard
- Edited by: Christophe Pinel
- Music by: Christophe Julien
- Distributed by: StudioCanal
- Release date: 25 November 2009 (France)
- Running time: 86 minutes
- Country: France
- Language: French
- Budget: $7 million
- Box office: $13.5 million

The Villain (French: Le Vilain) is a 2009 French comedy film written and directed by and starring Albert Dupontel.

== Plot ==
With gun-toting rivals on his tail, a daring bank robber, Sydney Thomas, takes refuge in the quiet residential street where he grew with his mother, Maniette, who still lives there. An unscrupulous property developer, Korazy, is buying up the neighborhood to turn it into a gleaming new banking district, but to her son's disgust Maniette leads the inhabitants resistance. Her ingenious methods provoke her boy's admiration, but he fights back with sneaky traps and underhand tricks when Maniette tries to force him to do the right thing just once in his life.

== Cast ==
- Catherine Frot as Maniette Thomas, Sydney's mother
- Albert Dupontel as Sydney Thomas, "le Vilain"
- Bouli Lanners as Nick Korazy
- Nicolas Marié as Doc William
- Bernard Farcy as Inspector Elliot
- Christine Murillo as Carmen Somoza, the Spanish teacher
- Jacqueline Herve as Huguette
- Philippe Duquesne as The redhead painter
- Husky Kihal as The other painter
- Xavier Robic as Korazy's secretary
