= Cash Truck =

2004 film by Nicolas Boukhrief

- Film poster
- Directed by: Nicolas Boukhrief
- Written by: Nicolas Boukhrief; Eric Besnard
- Produced by: Richard Grandpierre
- Starring: Albert Dupontel; Jean Dujardin; François Berléand
- Cinematography: Dominique Colin
- Edited by: Jacqueline Mariani
- Music by: Nicolas Baby
- Production companies: Canal+ CinéCinéma; Contre Prod; Eskwad; Studio Images 9
- Distributed by: Mars Distribution
- Release date: 10 April 2004
- Running time: 95 minutes
- Country: France
- Language: French
- Budget: $4.3 million
- Box office: $2.9 million

Cash Truck (French: Le Convoyeur) is a 2004 French action thriller film directed by Nicolas Boukhrief, who co-wrote the script with Eric Besnard. It was remade in English by director Guy Ritchie in 2021 as Wrath of Man.

In the film, a money transport company faces a series of armed robberies and the murders of its guards by the robbers. The company's newest guard is welcomed for his skills, but he is secretly seeking revenge for the death of his son at the hands of the robbers. He is also trying to hide his recurring attacks of epilepsy from his co-workers.

== Plot ==
Fear and uncertainty prevail in the money transport company Vigilante. Three of the transports have recently been robbed and the guards killed. The perpetrators were able to escape undetected every time. It always seems to be the same gang. It is clear to the employees that there must be a mole in their company. In addition, the company will soon be bought by a U.S. company in a month. However, it is not yet clear who will be retained and who will lose his job.

In this situation, Alexandre Demarre is hired as a new employee. At first he is watched suspiciously by his colleagues, but when he proves himself in a robbery and fends off the assailants, he is welcomed into the group. His living conditions remain a mystery, however, as he doesn't let anyone get close to him. Alexandre has repeated attacks of epilepsy, but he can hide them well from his colleagues. In his hotel room he has pinned photos and files about the Vigilante employees onto a wall.

A flashback explains the reason for his actions: he and his son accidentally witnessed a robbery on a company money transport. His son was shot in cold blood by a masked perpetrator, while he barely survived the attack. Now he wants to avenge the murder of his son. He promised that to his wife, who has been committed to a psychiatric clinic ever since.

When the gangsters attempt to rob Vigilante's vaults in a final coup, it comes to a big showdown. Alexandre and the loyal staff overwhelm and kill the criminals amidst great carnage. After the battle, Alexandre, seriously injured, drives to the spot where his son was shot and lies down by the roadside to die.

== Cast ==
- Albert Dupontel as Alexandre Demarre
- Jean Dujardin as Jacques
- François Berléand as Bernard
- Claude Perron as Nicole
- Philippe Laudenbach as The Mummy
- Nicolas Marié as The Boss
- Julien Boisselier as The Weasel
- Alban Lenoir as The Gunman

== Remake ==
In October 2019 it was announced that Guy Ritchie would write and direct an English language remake of the film starring Jason Statham. The remake, titled Wrath of Man, was released on 7 May 2021.
