= Ludovic Janvier =

French writer

- Born: 24 October 1934; Paris, France
- Died: 18 January 2016 (aged 81); Ivry-sur-Seine, France
- Occupations: Novelist; Essayist; Poet

Ludovic Janvier (24 October 1934 in Paris – 18 January 2016 in Ivry-sur-Seine) was a French novelist, poet, essayist, and short-story writer. He was the grandson of Haitian writer and politician Louis-Joseph Janvier.

== Biography ==
Of Haitian descent, Ludovic Janvier was born in Paris in 1934, where he lives most of the time. His desire to write goes back a long way, to his adolescence. He died on January 18, 2016, in Ivry-sur-Seine of cancer.

== Work ==
=== Novels ===
- 1968: La Baigneuse, Éditions Gallimard
- 1974: Face, Gallimard
- 1984: Naissance, Gallimard
- 1988: Monstre, va, Gallimard
- 2012: La Confession d'un bâtard du siècle, Fayard

=== Short stories ===
- 1993: Brèves d’amour, Gallimard
- 1996: En mémoire du lit, Brèves d'amour 2, Gallimard, Prix Goncourt de la Nouvelle
- 2002: Encore un coup au cœur, Brèves d'amour 3 (short stories), Gallimard
- 2002: Tue-le, Gallimard
- 2016: Apparitions, Brèves d'amour 4 (short stories), Gallimard

=== Poetry ===
- 1987: La Mer à boire, Gallimard
- 1992: Entre jour et sommeil, Seghers
- 1998: Comme un œil, dessins de Jean-Marie Queneau, Vézelay, Éditions de la Goulotte
- 2001: Doucement avec l'ange, Gallimard
- 2003: Bon d'accord, allez je reste !, inventaire/invention
- 2004: Des rivières plein la voix, Gallimard, Prix Roger-Kowalski
- 2006: Une poignée de monde, Gallimard

=== Essays ===
- 1964: Une parole exigeante, Éditions de Minuit
- 1966: Pour Samuel Beckett, Minuit
- 1969: Samuel Beckett par lui-même, Éditions du Seuil
- 1998: Bientôt le soleil, Flohic Éditions
