= Bruno Bayen =

French novelist, playwright and theatre director

- Born: 13 November 1950; Paris, France
- Died: 6 December 2016 (aged 66)
- Education: École Normale Supérieure
- Occupations: Novelist, playwright
- Parent: Maurice Bayen

Bruno Bayen (13 November 1950 – 6 December 2016) was a French novelist, playwright and theatre director.

== Early life ==
Bruno Bayen was born on 13 November 1950 in Paris. His father worked as the rector of the University of Strasbourg. With his four siblings, he grew up in Clermont-Ferrand and Strasbourg.

Bayen graduated from the École Normale Supérieure.

== Career ==
Bayen founded La Fabrique, a theatre company, and directed several plays for five years. In 1972, he directed his first play, Le Pied by Victor Hugo. Two years later, in 1975, he was appointed as co-director of the Grenier de Toulouse, a theatre in Toulouse, alongside Maurice Sarrazin. However, he stepped down in 1978. Over the course of his career, he went on to direct 30 plays, some of his own as well as plays by German playwrights Frank Wedekind, Georg Büchner, Rainer Werner Fassbinder and Johann Wolfgang von Goethe.

Bayen was the author of more than a dozen books, including novels, plays and essays. He was also a German-to-French translator. For example, he translated the works of Peter Handke into French. In 2006, he was disinvited from a talk at the Comédie-Française for his ties to Handke, who had attended Serbian dictator Slobodan Milosevic's funeral.

Bayen was also the author of two libretti: Schliemann, composed by Betsy Jolas, in 1995; and Jusqu’à l’extinction des consignes lumineuses, composed by Arrigo Barnabé, in 2005.

== Death ==
Bayen died on 6 December 2016.

== Works ==
=== Novels ===
- Bayen, Bruno (1987). Jean 3 Locke. Paris: Gallimard. ISBN 9782070708635. OCLC 17181583.
- Bayen, Bruno (1990). Restent les voyages. Paris: Seuil. ISBN 9782020114653. OCLC 21561059.
- Bayen, Bruno (1991). Éloge de l'aller simple. Paris: Seuil. ISBN 9782020127394. OCLC 23648937.
- Bayen, Bruno (1998). Les Excédés. Paris: Mercure de France. ISBN 9782715220881. OCLC 40321531.
- Bayen, Bruno (2000). La Forêt de six mois d'hiver. Paris: Mercure de France. ISBN 9782715222243. OCLC 45125704.
- Bayen, Bruno (2003). La Vie sentimentale. Paris: Mercure de France. ISBN 9782715223769. OCLC 53091469.
- Bayen, Bruno (2011). Fugue et rendez-vous. Paris: C. Bourgois. ISBN 9782267021370. OCLC 697265106.

=== Plays ===
- Bayen, Bruno (1982). Schliemann, épisodes ignorés. Paris: Gallimard. ISBN 9782070210596. OCLC 10021281.
- Bayen, Bruno (1984). Faut-il choisir !? Faut-il rêver !?. Paris: l'Avant-scène. OCLC 878604396.
- Bayen, Bruno (1992). Weimarland; L'enfant bâtard. Paris: L'Arche. ISBN 9782851813039. OCLC 408661873.
- Bayen, Bruno (1997). À trois mains. Paris: L'Arche. ISBN 9782851813961. OCLC 38449922.
- Bayen, Bruno (1999). La fuite en Egypte. Paris: L'Arche. ISBN 9782851814234. OCLC 41153229.
- Bayen, Bruno (2003). Plaidoyer en faveur des larmes d'Héraclite. Paris: L'Arche. ISBN 9782851815422. OCLC 181334628.
- Bayen, Bruno (2006). L'Éclipse du 11 août. Paris: L'Arche. ISBN 9782851816276.
