= Locked Out (film) =

- Theatrical release poster
- French: Enfermés dehors
- Directed by: Albert Dupontel
- Written by: Albert Dupontel; Guillaume Laurant
- Produced by: Richard Grandpierre
- Starring: Albert Dupontel; Claude Perron
- Cinematography: Benoît Debie
- Edited by: Richard Leclers; Christophe Pinel
- Music by: Denis Barthe; Vincent Bosle; Ramon Pipin; Jean-Paul Roy
- Distributed by: UGC Distribution
- Release date: 5 April 2006 (France)
- Country: France
- Language: French
- Budget: $5.8 million
- Box office: $3.7 million

Locked Out (French: Enfermés dehors, French pronunciation: [ɑ̃fɛʁme dəˈɔʁ]) is a 2006 French film directed by and starring Albert Dupontel, and written by him in collaboration with Guillaume Laurant.

In the film, a homeless man witnesses the suicide of a police officer. He proceeds to wear the dead man's uniform and starts impersonating him. The impostor is tasked with investigating a child abduction case and with locating the missing child.

== Plot ==
A glue-sniffing homeless person stumbles upon a policeman taking his own life and decides to put his abandoned uniform to good use. Initially this means using it to steal food from the police canteen but soon Roland discovers that wearing the uniform gives him certain powers and responsibilities, particularly tracking down the kidnapped child of a former porn star with whose picture he had fallen in love.

== Cast ==
- Albert Dupontel: Roland
- Claude Perron: Marie
- Nicolas Marié: Duval-Riché
- Hélène Vincent: Madame Duval
- Roland Bertin: Monsieur Duval
- Yolande Moreau: Gina
- Bouli Lanners: Youssouf
- Bruno Lochet: M'Burundé
- Serge Riaboukine: Jean-Pierre Lascoumes
- Philippe Duquesne: Indian
- Lola Arnaud: Coquelicot
- Dominique Bettenfeld: Sergeant Kur
- Jackie Berroyer: sex-shop customer
- Edouard Montoute: bus-driver
- Terry Gilliam: "fake baby" homeless person
- Terry Jones: homeless person
- Gustave de Kervern: policeman
