= The Creator (1999 film) =

- Theatrical release poster
- Directed by: Albert Dupontel
- Written by: Albert Dupontel; Gilles Laurent
- Produced by: Philippe Liégeois; Jean-Michel Rey
- Starring: Claude Perron; Albert Dupontel
- Cinematography: Jean-Claude Thibault
- Edited by: Scott Stevenson
- Music by: Ramon Pipin; Jean-Philippe Goude
- Distributed by: Rézo Films
- Release date: 16 June 1999 (France)
- Running time: 90 minutes
- Country: France
- Language: French
- Budget: $4,7 million
- Box office: $1,406,227

The Creator (Le créateur) is a 1999 French film written and directed by and starring Albert Dupontel.

== Plot ==
Darius is a playwright who lost his inspiration but agreed to write a new play for a producer. A few months later he discovers that the play promotion has started, and that actors have been cast and are ready to rehearse a text he has not been able to write so far.

== Cast ==
- Claude Perron as Chloé Duval
- Albert Dupontel as Darius
- Philippe Uchan as Victor
- Michel Vuillermoz as Simon
- Nicolas Marié as Pierre
- Paul Le Person as Monsieur Le Floc'h
- Patrick Ligardes as Gildas
- Dominique Bettenfeld as Jesus
- Terry Jones as God
- Michel Fau as Nicolas
- Isabelle Candelier as The journalist
- Christiane Cohendy as The mother
- Yves Pignot as The father
- Jacques Herlin as Le Majordome
