= Cortex (film) =

- Directed by: Nicolas Boukhrief
- Starring: André Dussollier; Marthe Keller
- Release date: 30 January 2008
- Running time: 1h 45min
- Country: France
- Language: French

Cortex is a 2008 French crime film directed by Nicolas Boukhrief.

== Cast ==
- André Dussollier - Charles Boyer
- Marthe Keller - Carole Rothmann
- Julien Boisselier - Thomas Boyer
- Pascal Elbé - Docteur Chenot
- Claude Perron - Béatrice Monnier
- Serge Renko - Jérémy
- Claire Nebout - Sandra
- Chantal Neuwirth - Francine
- Laure Salama - Diane
- Aurore Clément - Marie
- Gianni Giardinelli - Ludo
