= Nicolas Boukhrief =

French screenwriter, film director and actor

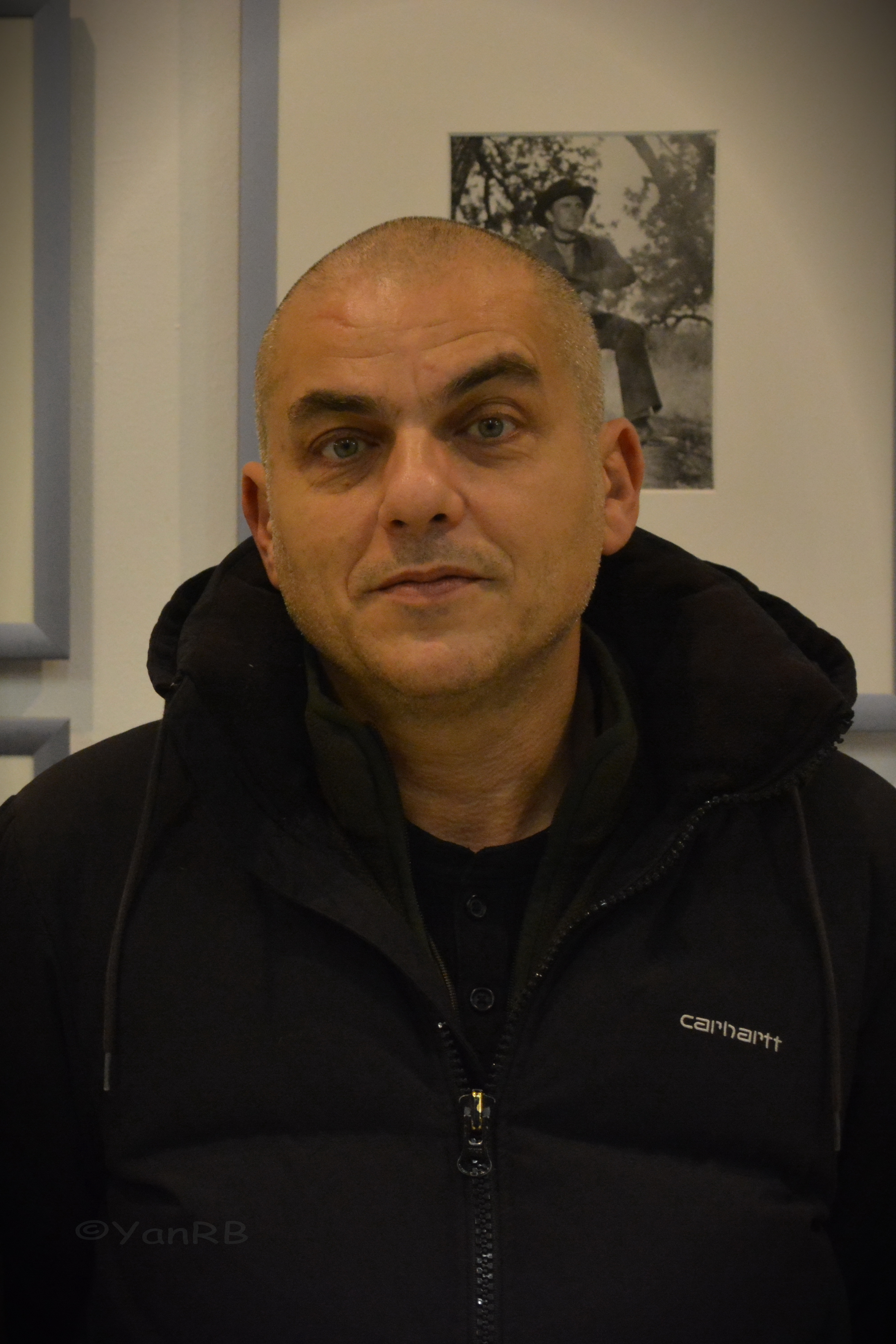
- Portrait of Nicolas Boukhrief in 2016
- Born: 4 June 1963 (age 63); Antibes, France
- Occupations: Film director, screenwriter
- Years active: 1993–present

Nicolas Boukhrief (born 4 June 1963) is a French screenwriter, film director and actor.

== Career ==
Boukhrief started his career as a journalist. In 1990 he created the Newspaper of the cinema on Canal+, and was the writer in chief until 1993, when he became the adviser on programming cinema. Since January 1997, he has been a programmer and presenter of My film club on Canal+. Along with Richard Grandpierre he was co-person in charge for Canal Plus Ecriture, and since 1997, of the department of Eskwad production within that chain. He was Andrzej Żuławski's assistant from 1985 to 1987. Thereafter he was a co-scenario writer of Jean-Jacques Zilbermann's film Not Everybody's Lucky Enough to Have Communist Parents, and of Assassin(s), directed by Mathieu Kassovitz.

== Filmography ==
Year	Title	Credited as		Notes
Year	Title	Director	Screenwriter	Notes
1993	Not Everybody's Lucky Enough to Have Communist Parents		Yes	Also as actor (uncredited)
1995	Va mourire	Yes	Yes	Also as actor
1997	Assassin(s)		Yes	Also as actor (Mehdi's brother)
1998	Pleasure (And Its Little Inconveniences)	Yes	Yes	
2004	Cash Truck	Yes	Yes	Also as casting director
2006	Silent Hill		Uncredited	Also as consulting producer
2008	Cortex	Yes	Yes	
2010	Gardiens de l'ordre	Yes	Yes	
2010	L'Italien		Yes	
2010	In Gold We Trust		Yes	
2013	Valentino		Yes	
2015	Made in France	Yes	Yes	
2016	La Confession	Yes	Yes	
2017	A Bright Blue Sky	Yes	Yes	TV film
2019	Three Days and a Life	Yes	Yes	
2021	Wrath of Man		Yes	
2021	Delicious		Yes	

== Awards ==
Event	Year	Film	Category	Award	Recipient	Ref.
Saraqusta Film Festival	2021	Delicious	Best script	Silver Dragon	Won	
