= Albert Dupontel =

French actor, film director and screenwriter

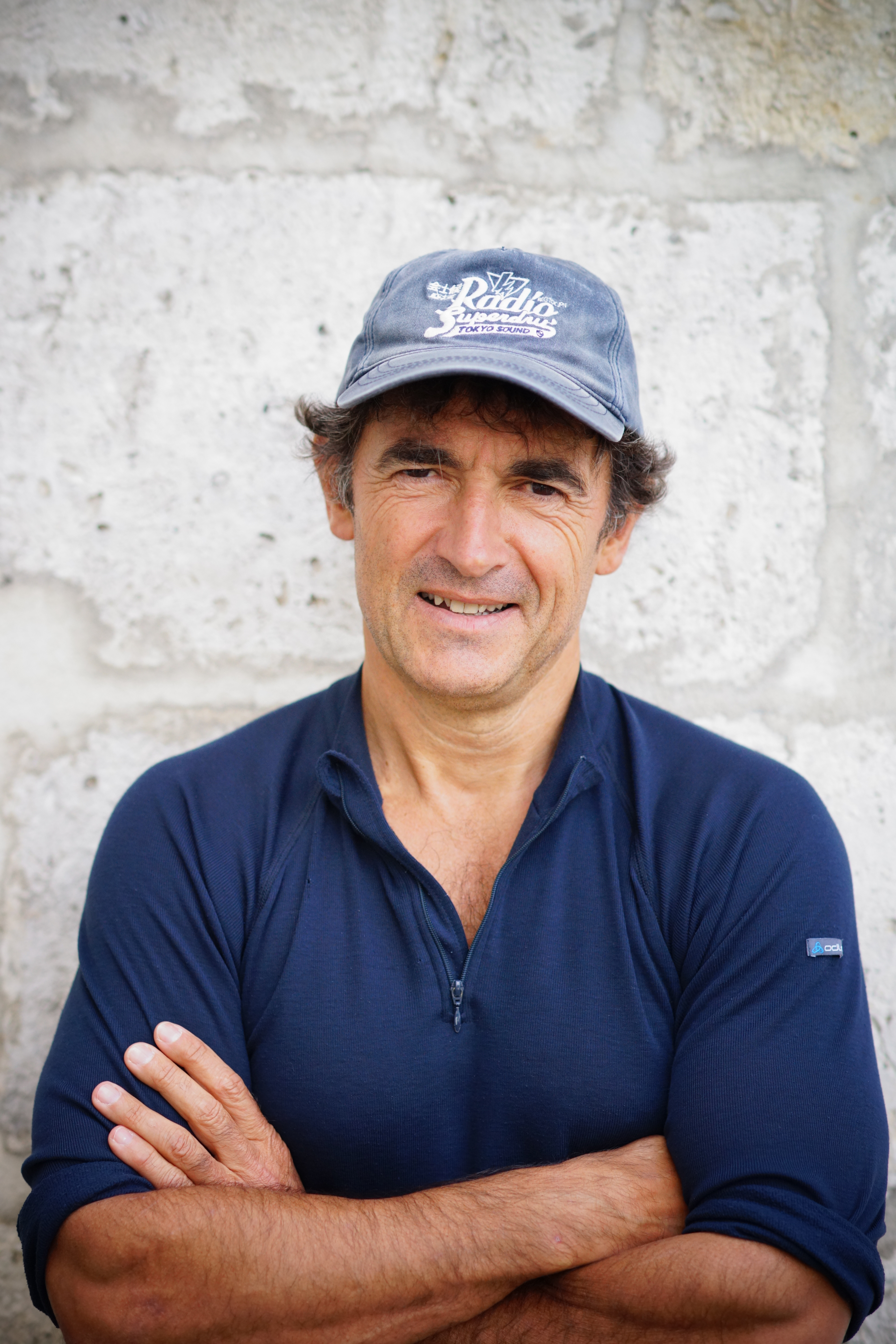
- Albert Dupontel in 2013
- Born: 11 January 1964 (age 62); Saint-Germain-en-Laye, France
- Occupations: Actor, film director, screenwriter
- Years active: 1988–present

Albert Dupontel (French: [albɛʁ dypɔ̃tɛl]; born 11 January 1964) is a French actor, film director and screenwriter. Following his father's path, he studied medicine but eventually switched to theater, disillusioned by hospital life. He started his career as a stand-up comedian. In February 1998, his film Bernie took the Grand Prize at the 9th Yubari International Fantastic Film Festival which was attended by Dupontel.

== One-man shows ==
Year	Title	Author	Director
1990–91	Sale spectacle 1	Albert Dupontel	Albert Dupontel
1992–93	Sale spectacle 2	Albert Dupontel	Albert Dupontel

== Filmography ==
=== As actor ===
Year	Title	Role	Notes
1988	Once More	Alain	
1988	La grande séance	The receptionist	Short
1989	Gang of Four	A (fake) thug	
1989	La nuit du doute		Short
1990	Sales histoires		TV movie
1990	V comme vengeance		TV series (1 episode)
1992	Désiré	The doctor	Short; Also director and screenwriter
1993	Chacun pour toi	Gus	
1994	Giorgino	Orderly	
1996	Bernie	Bernie Noël	Also director and screenwriter
1996	A Self Made Hero	Dionnet	Nominated - César Award for Best Supporting Actor
1996	Je suis ton châtiment		Short
1998	Serial Lover	Eric Cellier	
1999	The Creator	Darius	Also director and screenwriter
1999	Sachs' Disease	Dr. Bruno Sachs	Nominated - César Award for Best Actor
1999	Blue Away to America	Professor Helpos	
2000	Actors	The cop	
2001	L'Origine du monde	Transvestite	
2002	Monique	Alex	
2002	Irréversible	Pierre	
2002	Dead Man's Hand	Jean	
2003	The Car Keys	Himself	
2004	Cash Truck	Alexandre Demarre	
2004	A Very Long Engagement	Célestin Poux	
2006	Avida	The clumsy bodyguard	
2006	Président	The President	
2006	Locked Out	Roland	Also director and screenwriter Nominated - Globes de Cristal Award for Best Actor
2006	Avenue Montaigne	Jean-François Lefort	
2006	Odette Toulemonde	Balthazar Balsan	
2007	Chrysalis	David Hoffmann	
2007	Intimate Enemies	Sergeant Dougnac	Cairo International Film Festival - Best Actor
2007	Jacquou le Croquant	Jacquou's father	
2007	Changement de propriétaire		Short
2008	Paris	Jean	
2008	Love Me No More	Antoine Méliot	Nominated - César Award for Best Actor; Nominated - Globes de Cristal Award for Best Actor; Nominated - Lumière Award for Best Actor
2008	Louise Hires a Contract Killer	Miro	
2009	The Villain	Sydney Thomas	Also director and screenwriter
2010	The Clink of Ice	Charles' cancer	
2011	Twiggy	The museum director	
2011	The Prey	Franck Adrien	
2012	Le grand soir	Jean-Pierre Bonzini	
2013	9 Month Stretch	Bob Nolan	Also director and screenwriter Nominated - César Award for Best Actor; Nominated - Globes de Cristal Award for Best Actor
2015	En équilibre	Marc Guermont	
2016	The First, the Last	Cochise	
2017	See You Up There	Albert Maillard	Also director and screenwriter Nominated - César Award for Best Actor; Nominated - Globes de Cristal Award for Best Actor
2020	Bye Bye Morons	Jean-Baptiste Cuchas	Also director and screenwriter Nominated - César Award for Best Actor
2023	Second Tour	Pierre-Henry Mercier	Also director and screenwriter

=== As filmmaker ===
Year	Title	Credited as		Notes
Year	Title	Director	Screenwriter	Notes
1992	Désiré	Yes	Yes	Short film
1996	Bernie	Yes	Yes	Yubari International Fantastic Film Festival - Grand Prize; Nominated—César Award for Best First Feature Film
1999	The Creator	Yes	Yes	
2006	Locked Out	Yes	Yes	
2009	The Villain	Yes	Yes	
2013	9 Month Stretch	Yes	Yes	César Award for Best Original Screenplay; Globes de Cristal Award for Best Film; Nominated - César Award for Best Film; Nominated - César Award for Best Director; Nominated - Louis Delluc Prize for Best Film; Nominated - Lumière Award for Best Film; Nominated - Lumière Award for Best Director; Nominated - Lumière Award for Best Screenplay
2017	See You Up There	Yes	Yes	César Award for Best Director; César Award for Best Adaptation; Nominated - César Award for Best Film; Nominated - Globes de Cristal Award for Best Film; Nominated - Lumière Award for Best Film; Nominated - Lumière Award for Best Screenplay; Nominated - Seattle International Film Festival - Best Director
2020	Bye Bye Morons	Yes	Yes	César Award for Best Film; César Award for Best Director; César Award for Best Original Screenplay
2023	Second Tour	Yes	Yes	
