= List of burials at Père Lachaise Cemetery =

Among those interred at the Père Lachaise Cemetery in Paris are:

== A ==
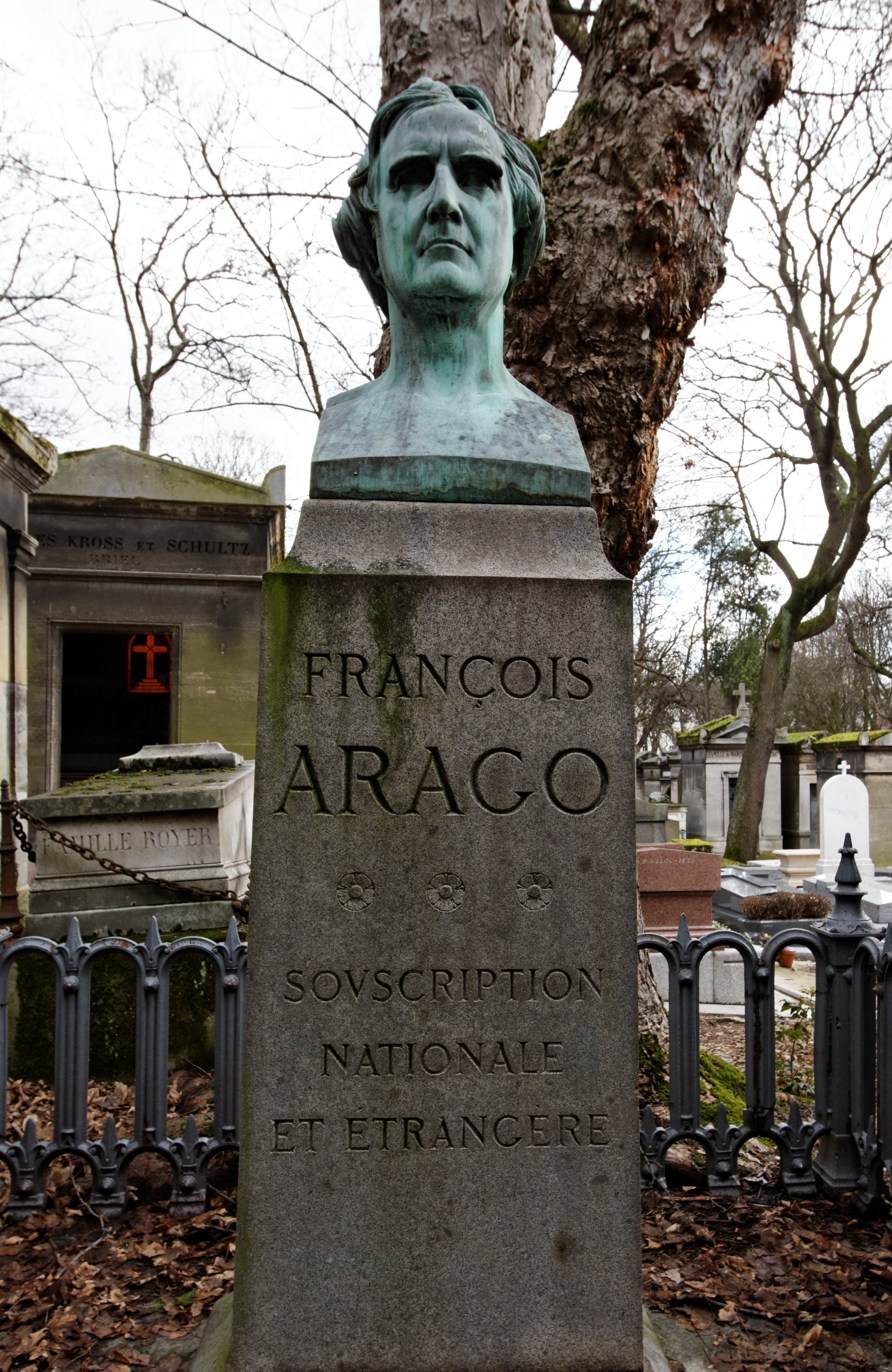
Grave of François Arago

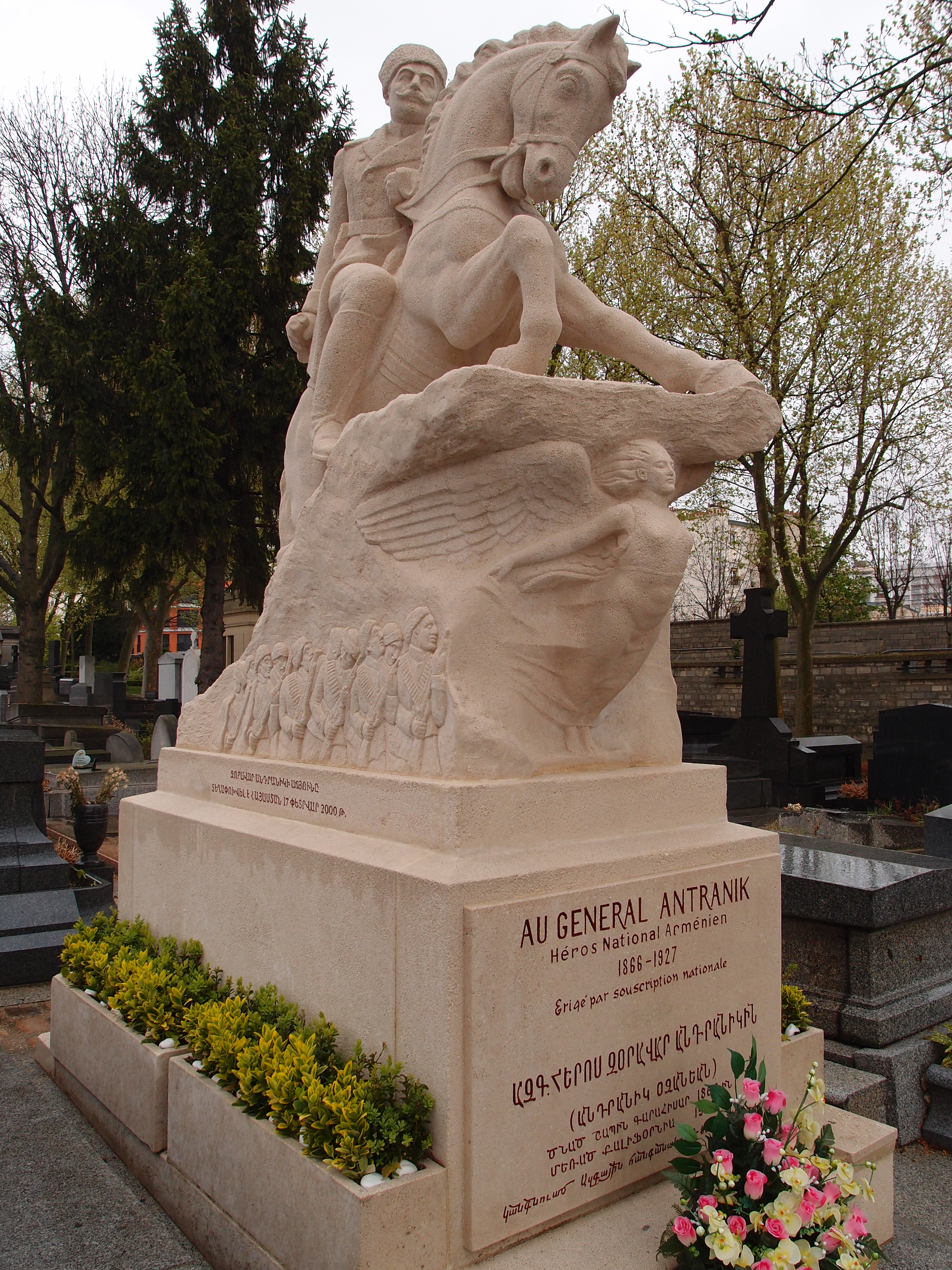
Andranik Ozanian's grave and statue, erected in 1945

- Peter Abelard – French philosopher
- Edmond François Valentin About – French novelist and journalist
- Mikola Abramchyk – Belarusian journalist and emigre politician
- Agustarello Affre – French operatic tenor
- Marie d'Agoult – French author who wrote under the nom de plume of Daniel Stern
- Avetis Aharonyan – Armenian politician, writer and public figure
- Chantal Akerman – Belgian filmmaker and writer
- Jehan Alain – French composer and organist
- Marietta Alboni – Italian opera singer
- Jean-Charles Adolphe Alphand – French civil engineer
- Émilie Ambre – French opera singer
- Elena Andreianova – Russian ballerina
- Andranik – Armenian military commander and statesman; remains transferred to Armenia in 2000.
- Karel Appel – Dutch painter
- Guillaume Apollinaire – French poet and art critic
- François Arago – French scientist and statesman
- Arman (Armand Fernandez) – French painter
- Miguel Ángel Asturias – Guatemalan diplomat and author, won the Nobel Prize for Literature in 1967
- Philip Astley – father of the modern circus
- Daniel Auber – French composer
- Hubertine Auclert – French feminist and activist for women's suffrage
- Pierre Augereau – French military commander and Marshal of France
- Jean-Pierre Aumont – French actor, father of Tina Aumont and husband of Maria Montez
- Jane Avril – French dancer

== B ==
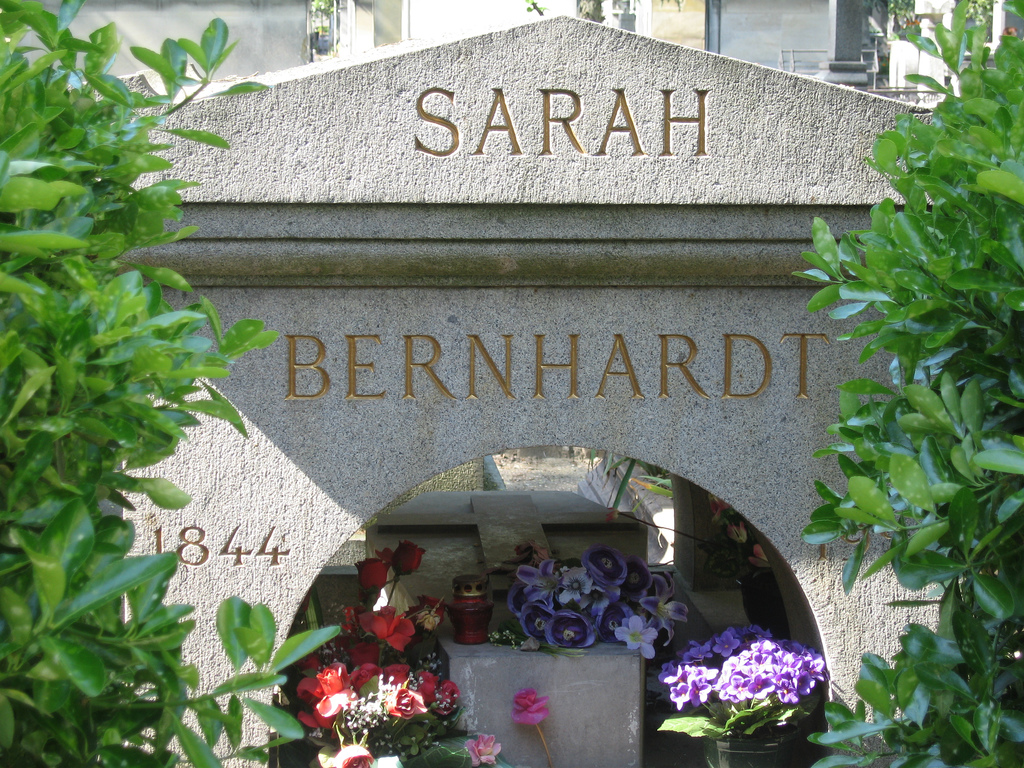
Grave of Sarah Bernhardt

- Salvador Bacarisse – Spanish composer
- Honoré de Balzac – French novelist of the 19th century
- Joseph Barbanègre – French general
- Henri Barbusse – French novelist
- Paul Barras – French statesman
- Antoine-Louis Barye – French sculptor
- Alain Bashung – French singer
- Stiv Bators – ashes sprinkled on the grave of Jim Morrison
- Paul Baudry – French painter
- Jean-Dominique Bauby – French journalist
- Jean-Louis Baudelocque – French obstetrician
- Pierre-Augustin Caron De Beaumarchais – French playwright
- Félix de Beaujour – French diplomat, politician and historian
- Gilbert Bécaud – French singer
- Pierre Augustin Béclard – French anatomist
- Vincenzo Bellini – Italian composer; remains later transferred to Italy
- Hans Bellmer – German (French) surrealist photographer, sculptor, draughtsman
- Judah P. Benjamin – American lawyer and statesman
- Pierre-Jean de Béranger – French lyricist
- Claude Bernard – French physiologist, known for several advances in medicine, as the introduction of the scientific method to the study of medicine, and the study of the sympathetic nervous system.
- Bernardin de Saint Pierre – French writer
- Sarah Bernhardt – French stage and film actress
- Alphonse Bertillon – French anthropologist and father of anthropometry
- Julien Bessières – French scientist, diplomat and politician
- Ramón Emeterio Betances – Puerto Rican nationalist; remains returned to Puerto Rico in 1920.
- Bruno Bianchi – French animator, co-creator of Inspector Gadget
- Xavier Bichat – French anatomist and pathologist
- Fulgence Bienvenüe – French civil engineer remembered as the Father of the Paris Métro
- Anne Bignan – French poet and translator
- Samuel Bing – German art dealer
- Georges Bizet – French composer and conductor
- Louis Blanc – French historian and statesman
- Sophie Blanchard – first professional female balloonist and the first woman to die in an aviation accident
- Auguste Blanqui – French revolutionary socialist.
- François-Adrien Boieldieu – French composer
- Rosa Bonheur – French painter
- Ludwig Börne – German political writer and satirist
- Paul Boucherot – French electrical engineer
- Louis of Bourbon-Two Sicilies – Italian count
- Stéphanie Louise de Bourbon-Conti – memoirist of the French Revolution
- Pierre Bourdieu – French sociologist
- Jean-Pierre Boyer – Second President of Haiti
- Brada - French writer
- Alexandrine-Caroline Branchu – French opera singer
- Édouard Branly – French scientist
- Pierre Brasseur – French actor
- Yvonne de Bray – French actress
- Januária of Brazil – Brazilian princess
- Jean Anthelme Brillat-Savarin – French lawyer, politician, epicure, and gastronome
- Alexandre-Théodore Brongniart – French architect, best known for designing the layout of the Pėre Lachaise Cemetery
- Pierre Brossolette – French journalist, politician and Résistance leader
- Jean de Brunhoff – French author of Babar the Elephant
- Auguste-Laurent Burdeau – French politician and plaintiff in the Drumont-Burdeau trial

== C ==
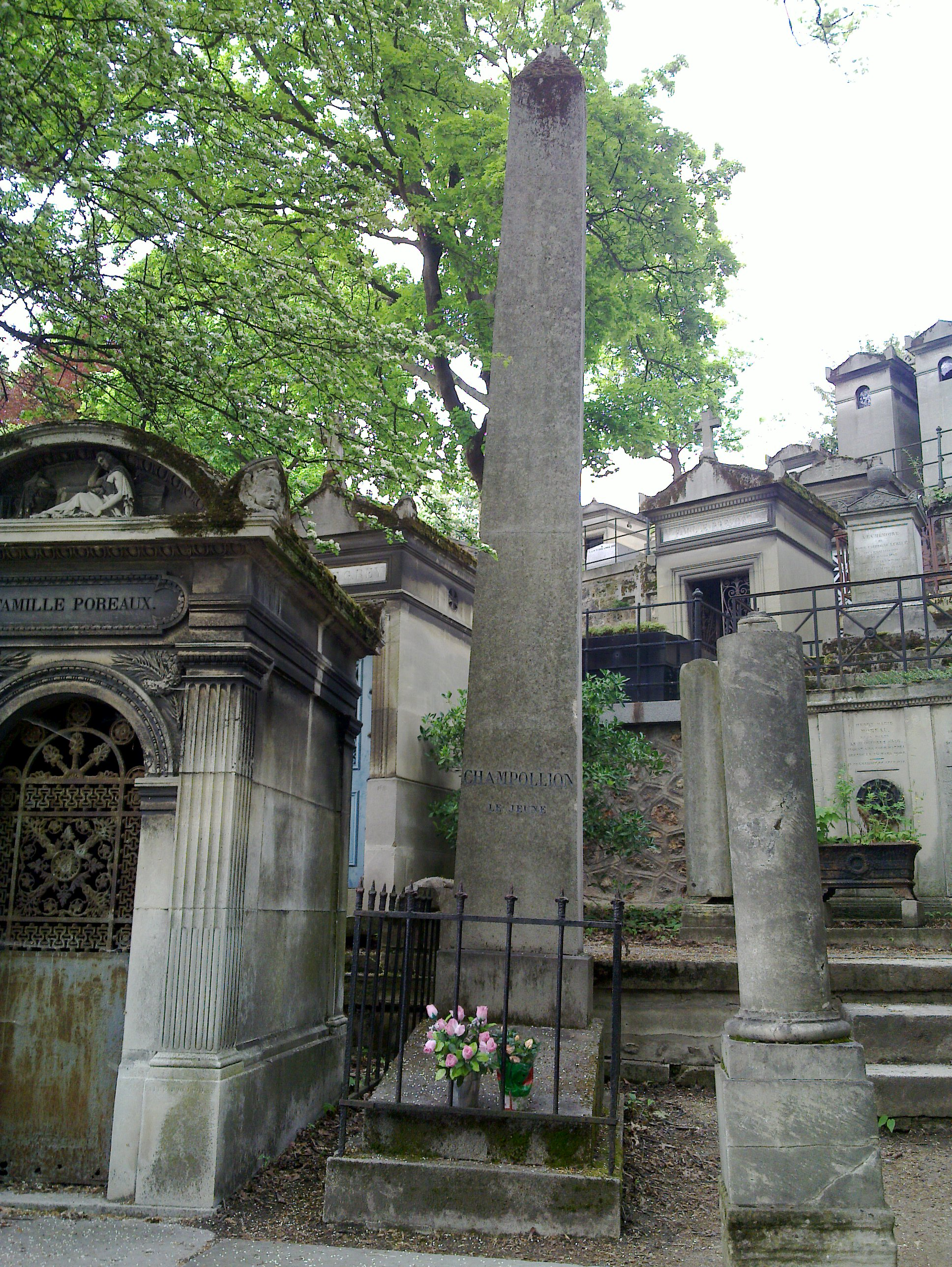
Grave of Jean-François Champollion

- Emmanuel Cabut (Mano Solo) – French singer
- Marcel Cachin – French Communist politician
- Joseph Caillaux – French statesman
- Gustave Caillebotte – French Impressionist painter
- Maria Callas – The opera singer's ashes were originally buried in the cemetery. After being stolen and later recovered, they were scattered into the Aegean Sea, off the coast of Greece. The empty urn remains in Père Lachaise.
- Lucienne Calvet, née Calmettes – Heroine of WWII, killed just before the Liberation of Paris in August 1944 when hanging a homemade tricolor flag from her window
- Sebastián Calvo de la Puerta y O'Farrill – governor of Spanish Louisiana
- Jean Jacques Régis de Cambacérès – French lawyer and politician
- Giulia Grisi de Candia – Italian opera singer, well known as "Giulia Grisi", her grave is marked Giullia de Candia.
- Jean-Joseph Carriès – French sculptor, ceramist, and miniaturist
- Pierre Cartellier – French sculptor
- Claude Chabrol – French film director
- Albert Champion – French road racing cyclist
- Jean-François Champollion – French decipherer of the hieroglyphs and father of Egyptology
- Claude Chappe – French pioneer of the telegraph
- Gustave Charpentier – French composer
- Ernest Chausson – French composer
- Jorge Chávez – Peruvian aviator . His remains were here from 1 October 1910 to September 1957, when they were transferred to Lima, Peru
- Richard Chenevix – Irish chemist
- Luigi Cherubini – Italian composer
- Claude de Choiseul-Francières – Marshal of France
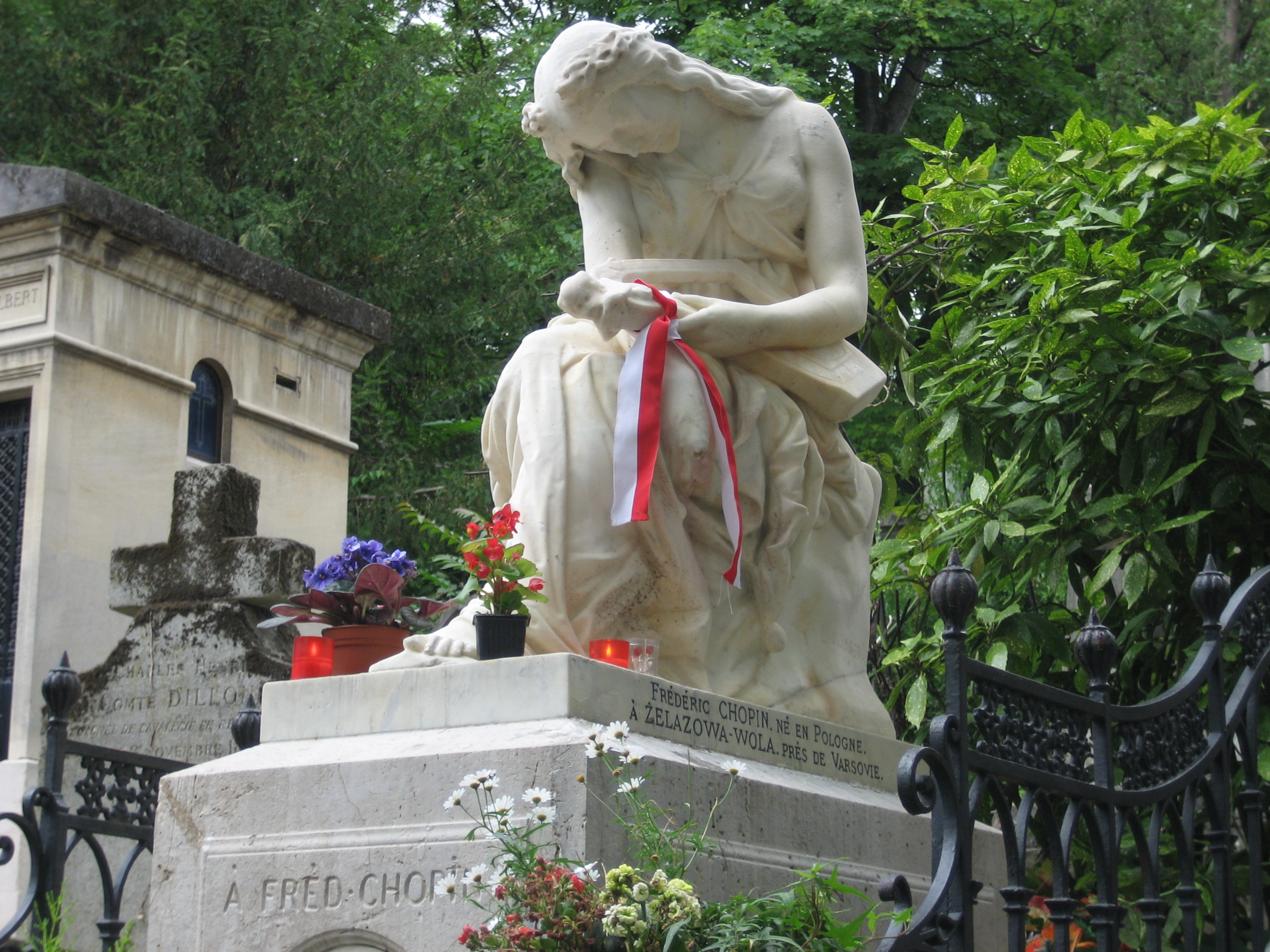
  Grave of Frédéric Chopin
- Frédéric Chopin – Polish composer. His heart is entombed within a pillar at the Holy Cross Church in Warsaw.
- Jean-Baptiste Clément – French songwriter and communard
- Auguste Clésinger – French painter and sculptor
- France Clidat – French pianist
- Émile Cohl – French cartoonist
- Colette – French novelist
- Count Alexandre Joseph Colonna-Walewski – French statesman (illegitimate son of Napoleon)
- Édouard Colonne – French conductor
- Auguste Comte – French thinker; father of Positivism
- Benjamin Constant – Swiss-born liberal philosopher
- Bruno Coquatrix – French lyricist and music impresario
- Jean-Baptiste-Camille Corot – French painter
- Ramón Corral – Mexican Politician, Vice-president from 1904 until 1911 under President Porfirio Díaz administration
- Jean-Pierre Cortot – French sculptor
- Benoît Costaz – French bishop
- Pierre Auguste Cot – French painter
- Georges Courteline – French playwright
- Thomas Couture – French painter
- Guy Crescent - French businessman
- Régine Crespin – French opera singer
- Rufino José Cuervo – Colombian writer and philologue
- Nancy Cunard – English poet and activist
- Henri Curiel – Egyptian politician
- Georges Cuvier – the founder of paleontology

== D ==
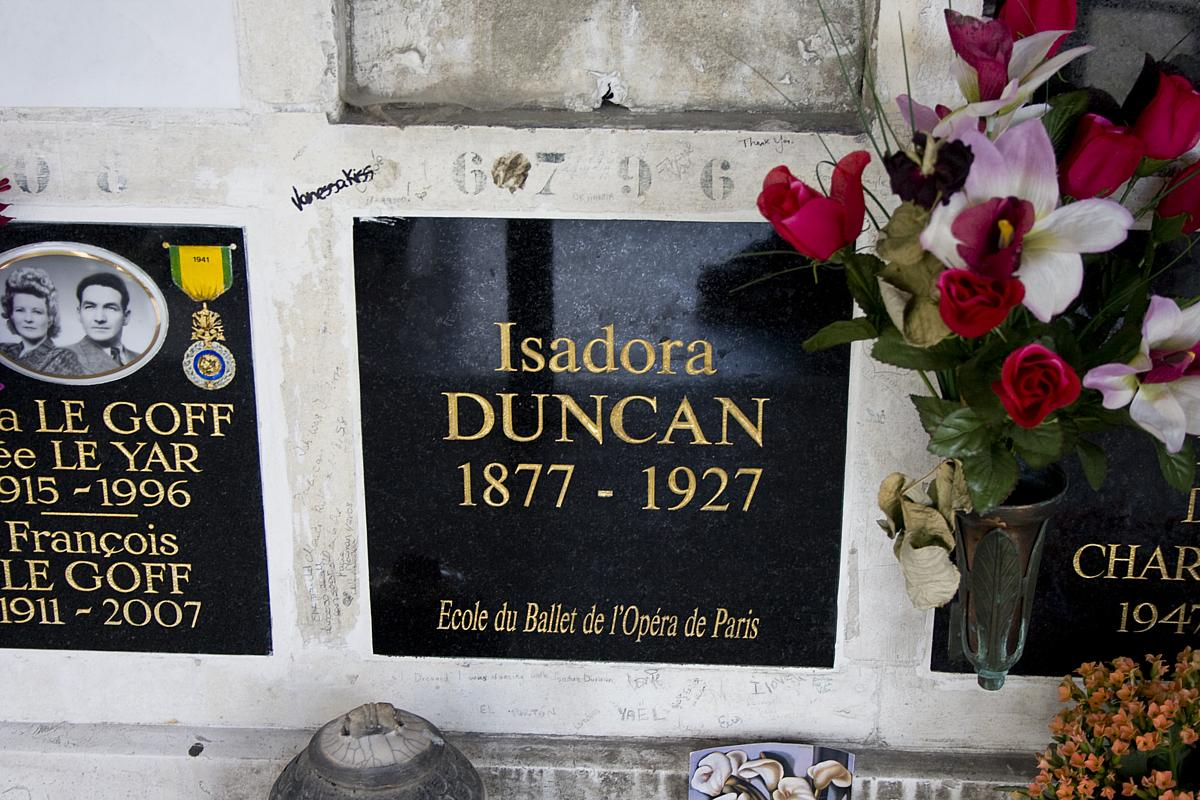
Cremated remains of Isadora Duncan in the Columbarium

- Jarosław Dąbrowski – exiled Polish revolutionary Nationalist and last Commander-in-Chief of the Paris Commune of 1871; cenotaphs on Federated Wall in northeast corner of the Père Lachaise Cemetery and outside the wall in the Square Samuel de Champlain
- Pierre Dac – French humorist
- Édouard Daladier – French Radical-Socialist politician of the 1930s, signatory of the Munich Agreement in 1938 and Prime Minister of France at the outbreak of the Second World War
- Alexandre Darracq – French automobile manufacturer
- Alphonse Daudet – French author who is known for his literary works, such as Letters from My Windmill
- Honoré Daumier – French caricaturist
- Jacques-Louis David – Napoleon's court painter was exiled as a revolutionary after the Bourbons returned to the throne of France. His body was not allowed into the country even in death, so the tomb contains only his heart.
- David d'Angers – French sculptor
- Louis-Nicolas Davout – Napoleon's "Iron Marshal"
- Marpessa Dawn – African American and French actress, singer and dancer
- Gérard Debreu – French economist, won the Nobel Prize for Economics in 1983
- Jean-Gaspard Deburau – Czech-born French actor and mime
- Denis Decrès – French admiral and Naval Minister under Napoleon
- Augusta Dejerine-Klumpke – French neuroscientist
- Cino Del Duca – Italian-born French publishing magnate, film producer and philanthropist
- Simone Del Duca – French businesswoman and philanthropist, wife of Cino Del Duca
- Élie-Miriam Delaborde – French virtuoso pianist and composer
- Eugène Delacroix – French Romantic artist
- Jean Baptiste Joseph Delambre – French mathematician
- Michel Delpech – French singer
- Pierre Dervaux – French conductor
- Pierre Desproges – French humorist
- Henry Edward Detmold – English painter and illustrator
- Gustave Doré – French artist and printmaker
- Michel Drach – French film director
- Marie Dubas – French singer
- Jacques Duclos – French communist politician
- Léon Dufourny – French architect
- Paul Dukas – French composer
- Isadora Duncan – American / Soviet dancer
- Henri Duparc – French composer
- Éléonore Duplay – Friend of French Revolutionary Maximilien Robespierre
- Guillaume Dupuytren – French surgeon
- Rosalie Duthé – French courtesan

== E ==
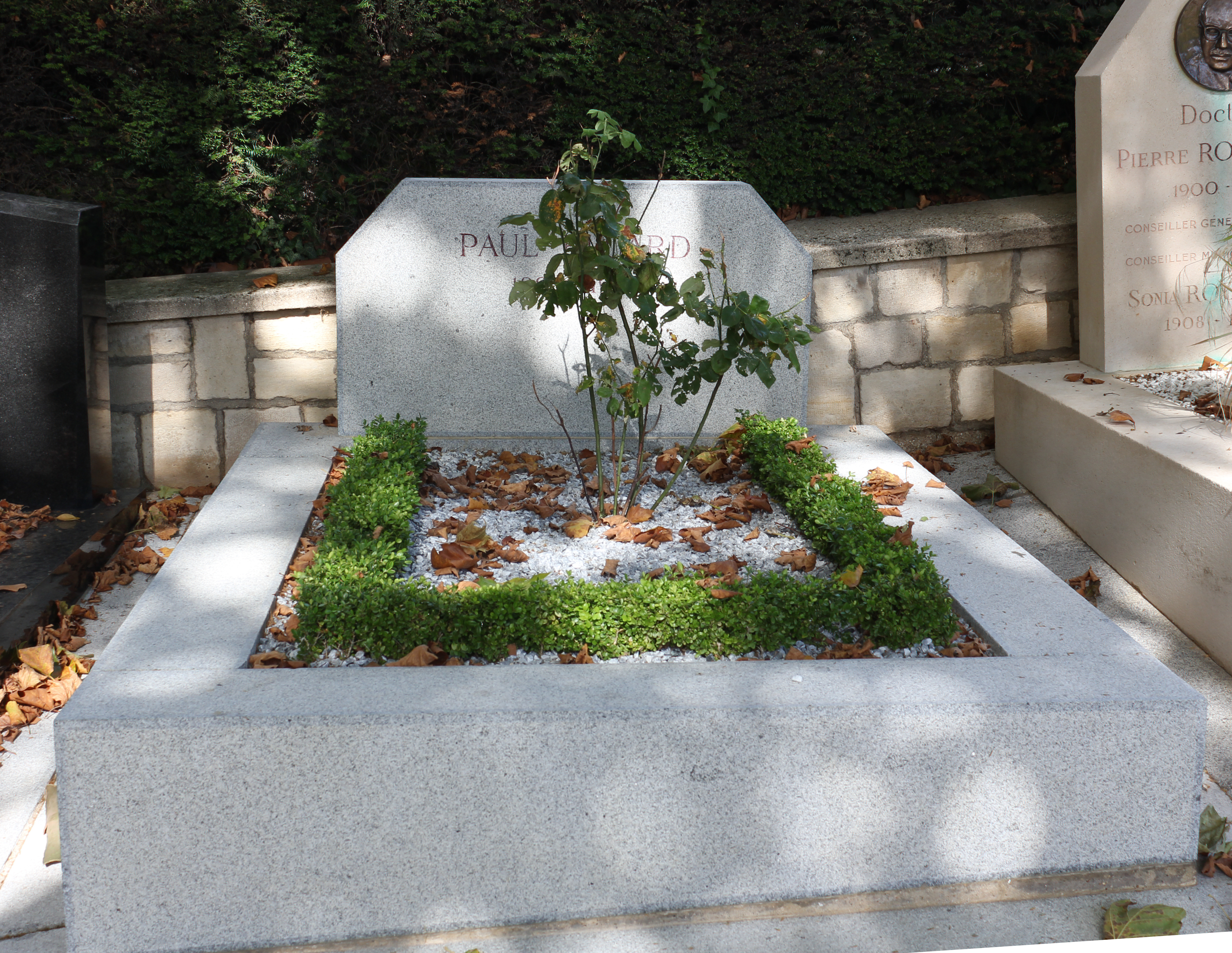
Grave of Paul Éluard

- Suzanne Eisendieck – German painter
- Paul Éluard – French surrealist poet
- George Enescu – Romanian composer, pianist, violinist and conductor
- Gérard Encausse (Papus) – French physician, hypnotist, and popularizer of occultism, founder of the Martinist Order
- Camille Erlanger – French composer
- Max Ernst – German artist
- Lucy Escott - American soprano

== F ==
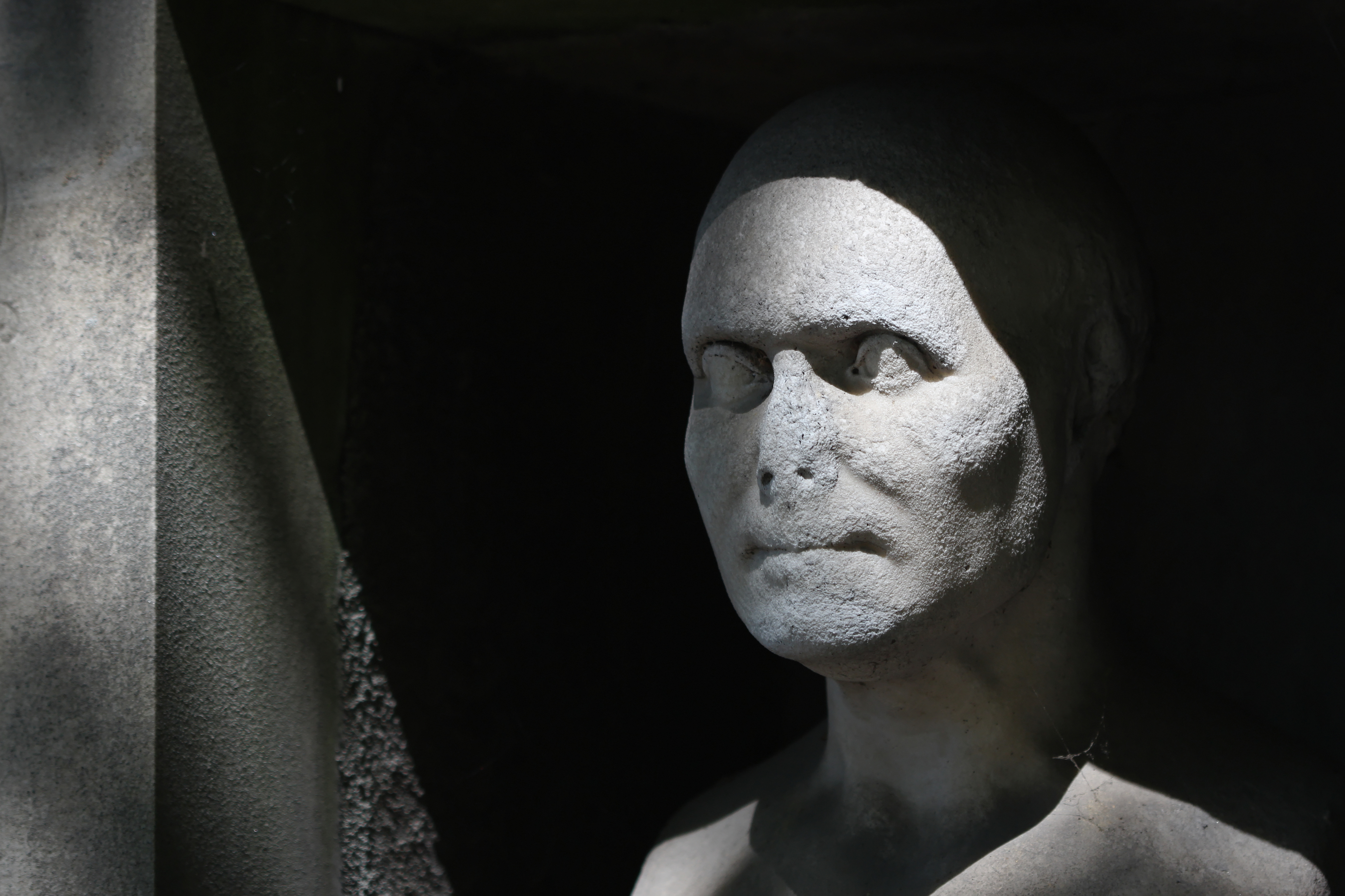
Grave of Joseph Fourier

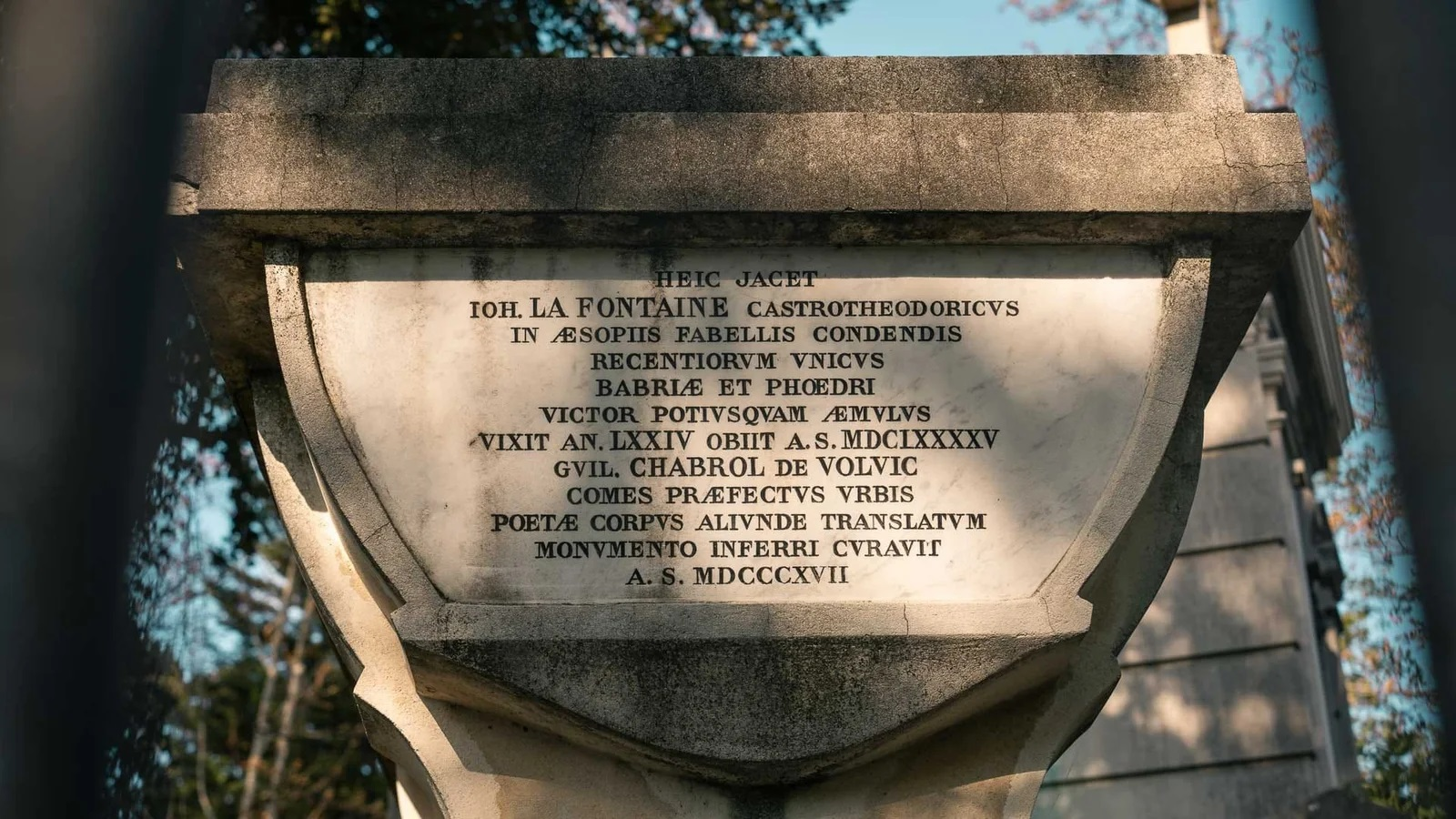
Grave of Jean de La Fontaine

- Alexandre Falguière – French sculptor
- Félix Faure – President of France
- Mehdi Favéris-Essadi – French DJ and musician
- Laurent Fignon – French cyclist, who won the Tour de France twice
- Horace Finaly – French banker, director general of the Banque de Paris et des Pays-Bas (Paribas)
- Hippolyte Flandrin, French painter
- Seymour Fleming – British noblewoman
- Robert de Flers – French playwright and journalist
- Suzanne Flon – actress
- Pierre François Léonard Fontaine – French Neo-classical Architect
- Jean de La Fontaine – French litterateur best known for fairy tales
- Thierry Fortineau – French actor
- Joseph Fourier – French mathematician and physicist
- Jean Françaix – French composer
- Pierre Frank – French Trotskyist politician
- William Temple Franklin – grandson of Benjamin Franklin
- Augustin-Jean Fresnel – French inventor of Fresnel Lens
- Loie Fuller – French dancer
- Marie-Madeleine Fourcade – also known as Madeline of the Resistance, leader of the French Resistance network "Alliance" during WWII

== G ==
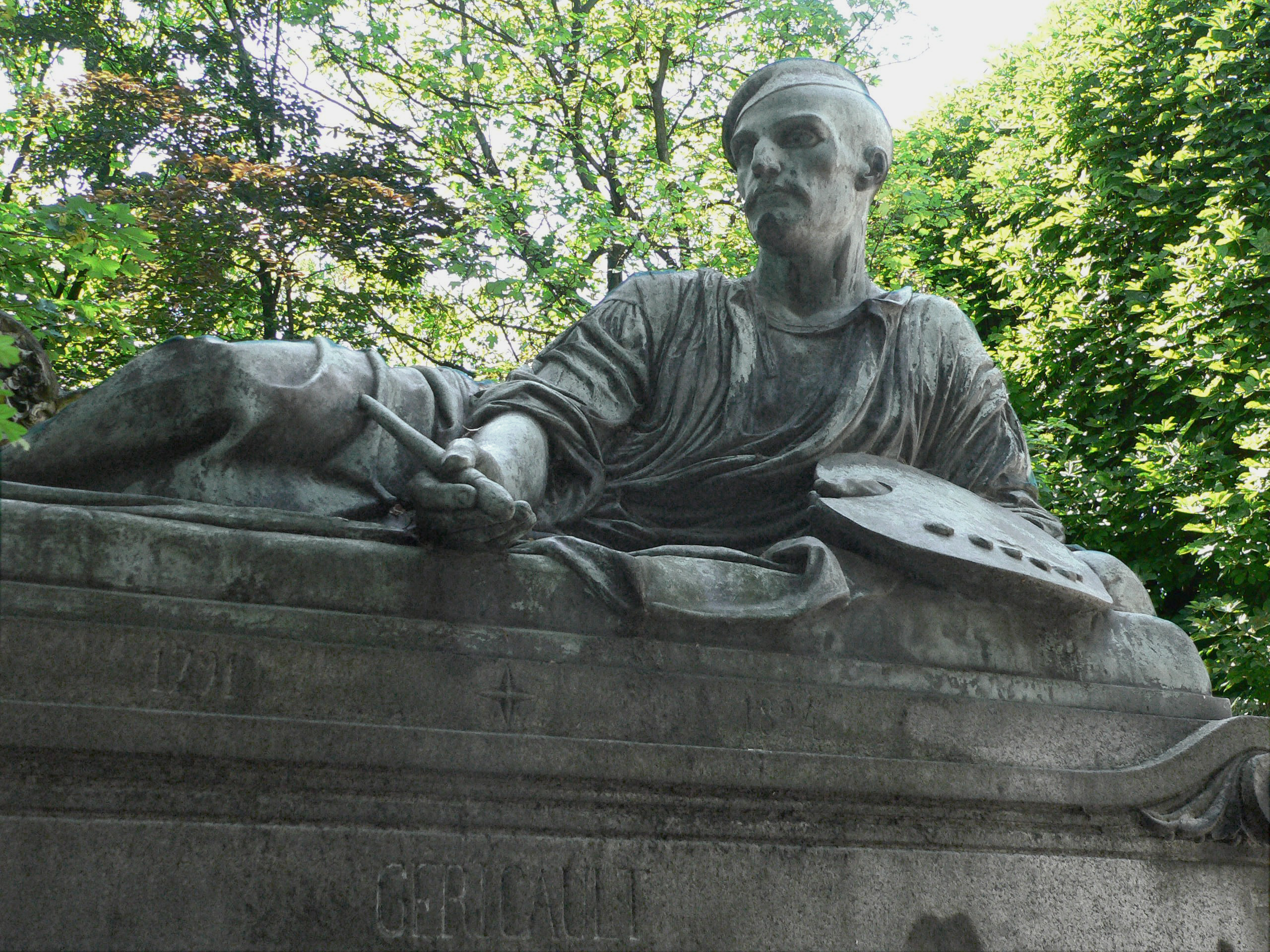
Grave of Théodore Géricault

- Antonio de La Gandara – French painter
- Louis-Antoine Garnier-Pagès – French statesman
- Joseph Louis Gay-Lussac – French chemist and physicist
- Pierre Georges – French Resistance leader better known as Colonel Fabien
- Théodore Géricault – French Romantic painter, whose major work The Raft of the Medusa is reproduced on his tomb by sculptor Antoine Étex.
- Sophie Germain – early French mathematician, physicist, and philosopher
- Abdul Rahman Ghassemlou – leader of the Democratic Party of Iranian Kurdistan
- John Gilchrist (linguist) – linguist, surgeon, and Indologist from Scotland
- André Gill – French caricaturist
- Annie Girardot – French actress
- Piero Gobetti – Italian activist and journalist
- Jean-Luc Godard - French/Swiss Film Director, screenwriter, and critic
- Manuel de Godoy – Spanish prime minister and court favorite
- Yvan Goll – French-German poet and his wife Claire Goll
- Enrique Gómez Carrillo – Guatemalan novelist, journalist, war correspondent, chronicler and diplomat
- Natalya Gorbanevskaya – Russian poet, a translator of Polish literature and a civil-rights activist
- Hélène Gordon-Lazareff – Russian-born French journalist, founder of Elle magazine
- François-Joseph Gossec – French composer
- Laurent de Gouvion Saint-Cyr – French military commander and Marshal of France
- Zénobe Gramme – inventor of the Direct Current (DC) Dynamo. A statue on the grave of Zénobe sits and looks at a dynamo rotor.
- Stéphane Grappelli – French jazz violinist and member of the Quintette du Hot Club de France
- Eileen Gray – Irish architect and furniture designer
- André Grétry – Belgian-born French composer
- Maurice Grimaud – French Prefecture of Police during May 1968
- Giulia Grisi – Italian opera singer. Her grave is marked under her married name, Giulia de Candia.
- Jean-Jacques Grunenwald – French musician
- Félix Guattari – French militant, institutional psychotherapist and philosopher
- Jules Guesde – French statesman
- Yvette Guilbert – actress and singer
- Joseph-Ignace Guillotin – proposed the guillotine as the official method of execution in France
- Jean Guillou – French musician
- Ernest Guiraud – French musician
- Yılmaz Güney – Kurdish/Turkish actor, film director, scenarist and novelist

== H ==
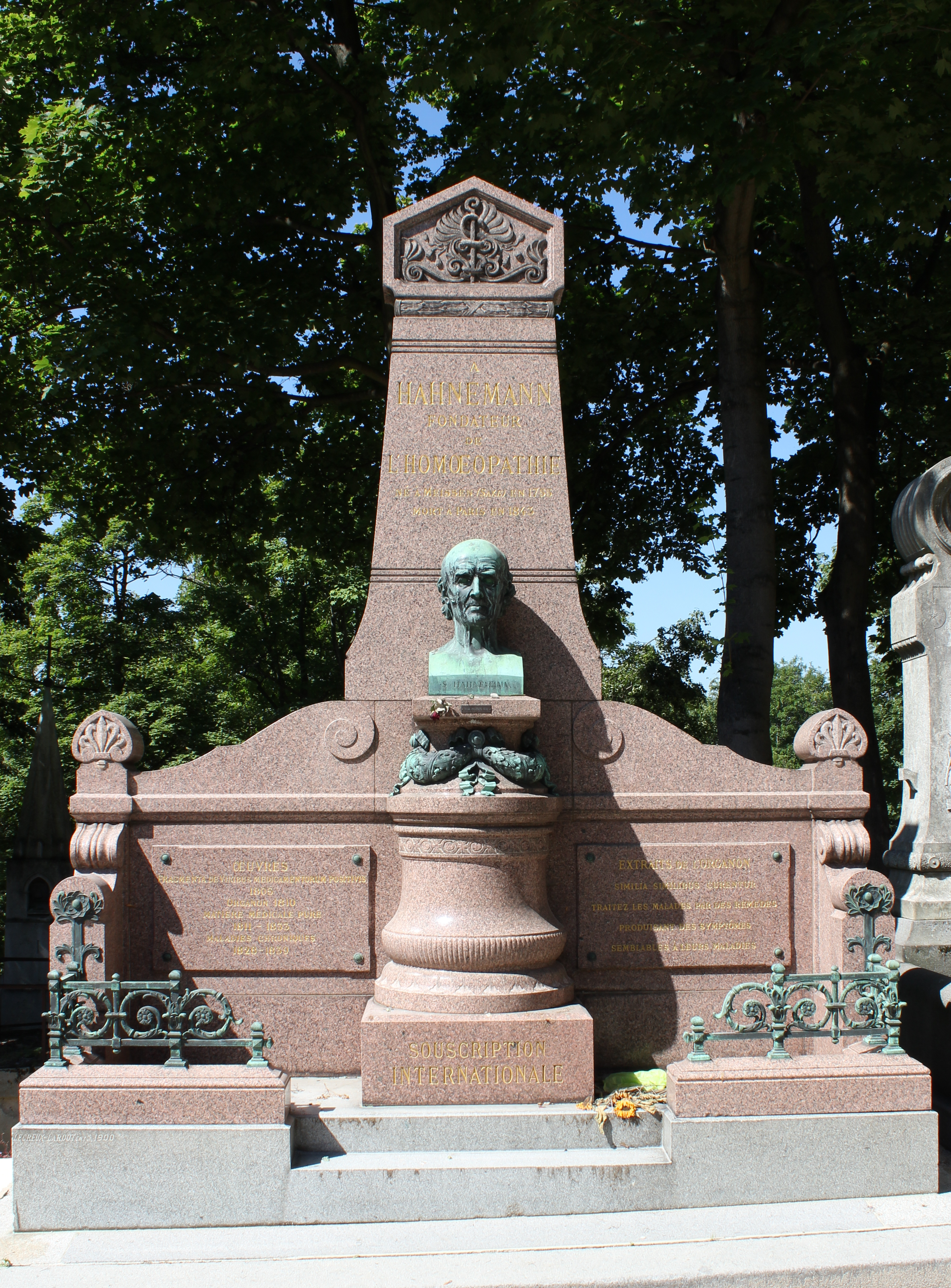
Samuel Hahnemann's mausoleum

- Terry Haass – French artist
- Melanie Hahnemann – French homeopathist, the first female doctor in homeopathy
- Samuel Hahnemann – German physician, founder of homeopathy
- Mahmoud Hamshari – assassinated Palestinian official
- Georges-Eugène Haussmann – French civil engineer and town planner
- Olivia de Havilland - British and American actress
- Jeanne Hébuterne – French artist and common-law wife of the artist Amedeo Modigliani
- Sadeq Hedayat – Iran's foremost modern writer of prose fiction and short stories
- Héloïse – French abbess and scholar, best known for her love affair with Peter Abelard
- Juliette Heuzey - French writer
- Laure Hayman - French sculptor, salonnière, demi-mondaine of late nineteenth and early twentieth century Paris
- Jacques Higelin – French singer
- Klementyna Hoffmanowa – Polish prose writer, popularizer, translator and editor
- Ticky Holgado – French actor
- Moritz Hochschild – German-born mining entrepreneur in Latin America, saviour of Jews from the Holocaust
- Jean-Nicolas Huyot – French architect best known for his work on the Arc de Triomphe

== I ==
- Jean Auguste Dominique Ingres – French painter
- Jean-Baptiste Isabey – French painter
- Charles Isabelle – French architect

== J ==
- Claude Jade – French actress
- Edmond Jabès – French-Egyptian-Jewish writer and poet
- Léon Jouhaux – French trade union leader, won the Nobel Peace Prize in 1951
- Emil Jungfleisch – French biochemist
- Jean-Andoche Junot - French General

== K ==
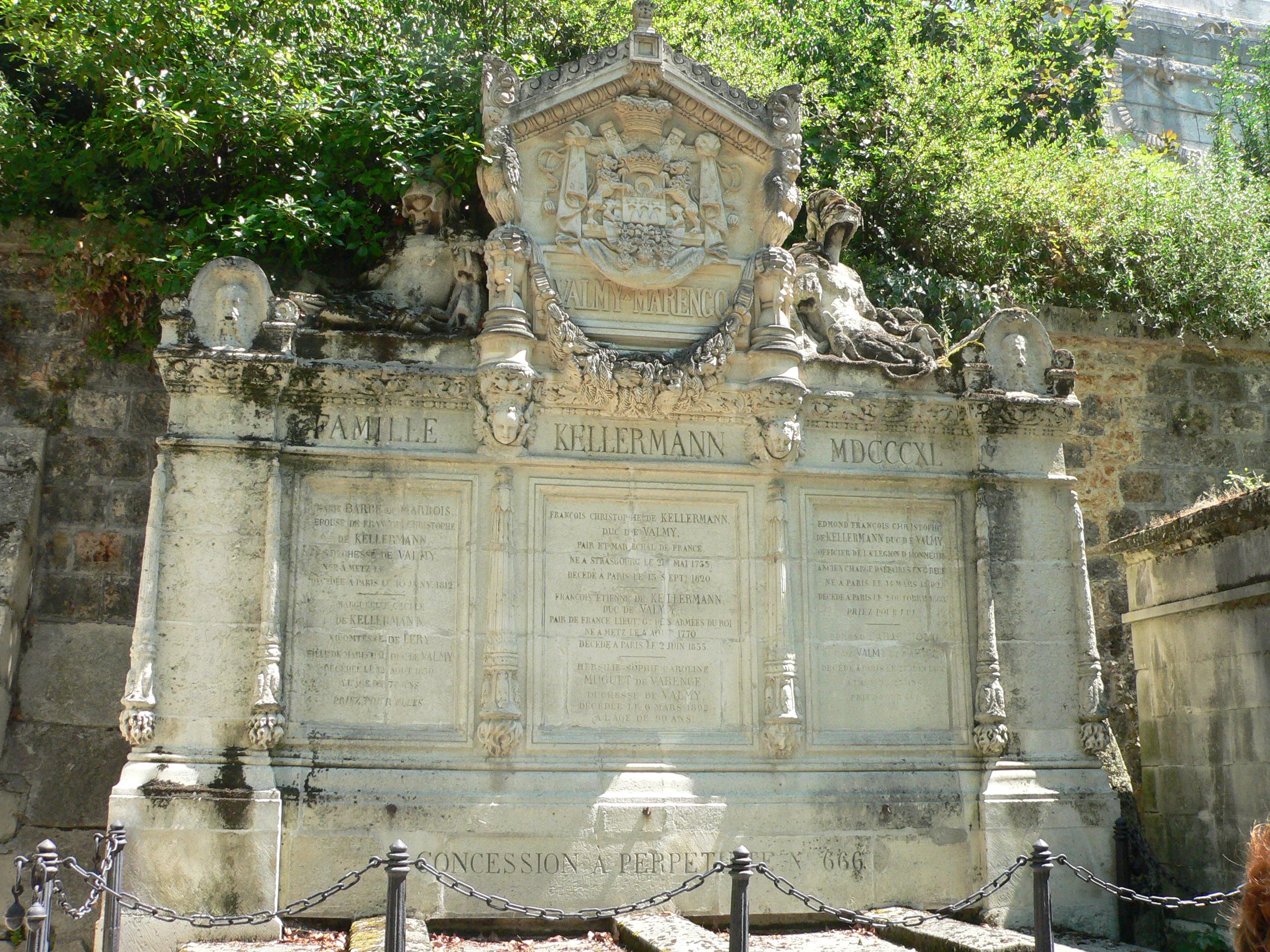
Grave of François Kellermann

- Božidar Kantušer – American and Slovenian composer
- Bojidar Karageorgevitch – Serbian prince
- Allan Kardec – born Hippolyte Leon Denizard Rivail, founder of Spiritism
- Anna Karina - Danish / French Film Actress
- Caroline Kauffmann – French feminist
- Ahmet Kaya – Turkish/Kurdish singer and songwriter and political exile
- François Christophe de Kellermann – French military commander and Marshal of France
- Patrick Kelly – American fashion designer
- Thomas Read Kemp – English property developer and statesman
- Alexander Khatisian – Prime Minister of Armenia
- Philippe Khorsand – French actor
- Henri Krasucki – French trade unionist
- Rodolphe Kreutzer – French violinist and composer

== L ==
- Jean de La Fontaine – French fabulist
- Jérôme Lalande – French astronomer and writer
- René Lalique – French glass designer
- Édouard Lalo – French composer
- Pierre-Simon Laplace – French mathematician and astronomer (remains moved to Saint Julien de Mailloc in 1888)
- Théophanis Lamboukas – French actor and singer, husband of Édith Piaf
- Francisco Largo Caballero – Former president of the Spanish II Republic.
- Dominique Jean Larrey – French military surgeon (remains moved to the Governors Crypt of Les Invalides in 1992)
- Clarence John Laughlin – American Surrealist photographer from New Orleans, Louisiana. His most famous published work was Ghosts Along the Mississippi.
- Marie Laurencin – French painter
- William Lawless – Irish revolutionary and General in French Army
- Charles-François Lebrun – French statesman
- Alexandre Ledru-Rollin – French politician
- Louis James Alfred Lefébure-Wély – French organist and composer
- François Joseph Lefebvre – French military commander and Marshal of France
- Edith Lefel – French singer
- Raymond Lefevre – French easy listening orchestra leader, arranger and composer
- Paul Legrand – French mime
- Adrien Lejeune - French communard
- Marie Anne Lenormand – French cartomancer
- Ferdinand de Lesseps – French architect, designed the Suez Canal
- Pierre Levegh – French racing driver killed in the 1955 Le Mans disaster
- Jean-François Lyotard – French philosopher

== M ==
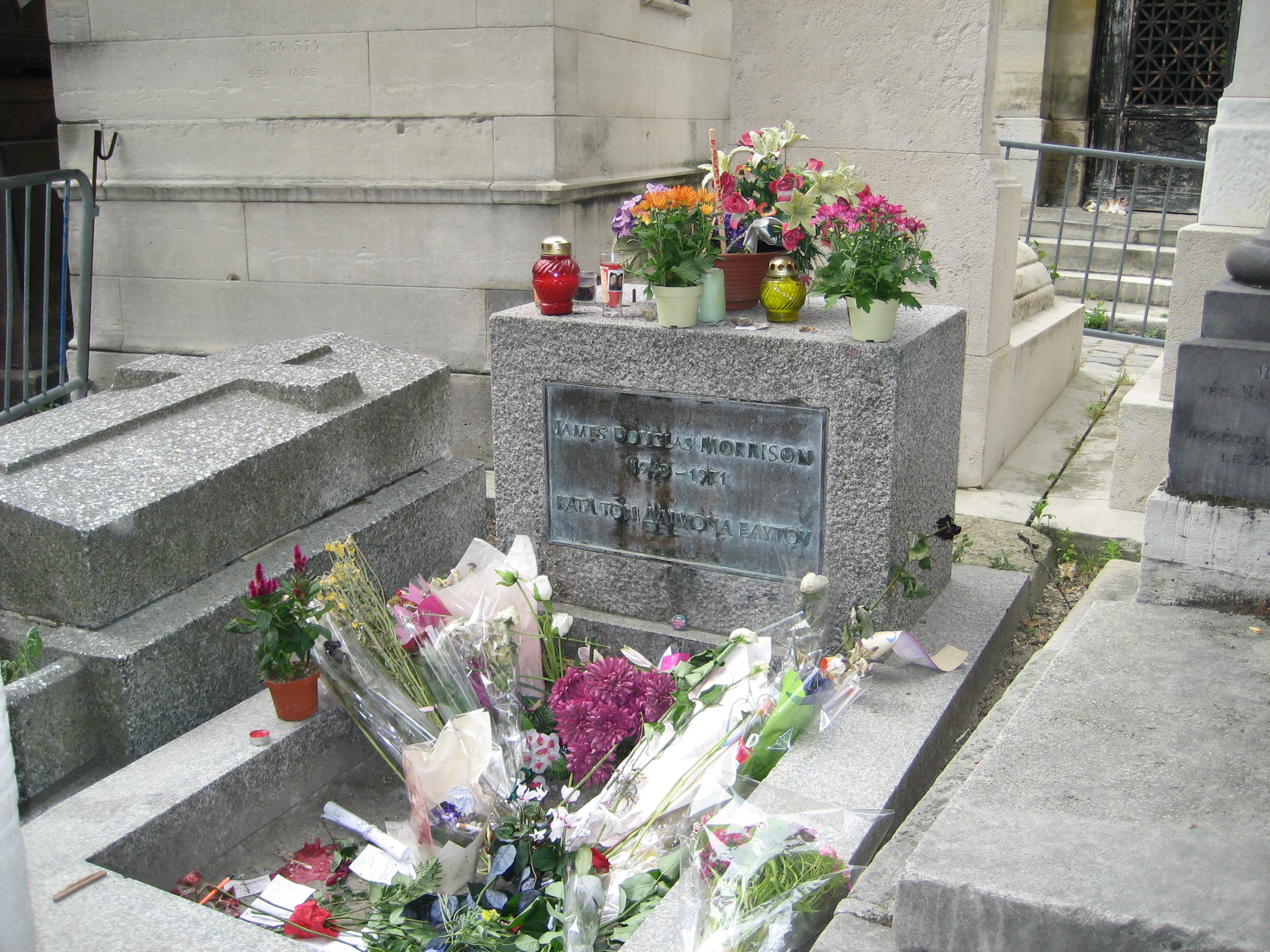
Grave of Jim Morrison

Grave of Joachim Murat

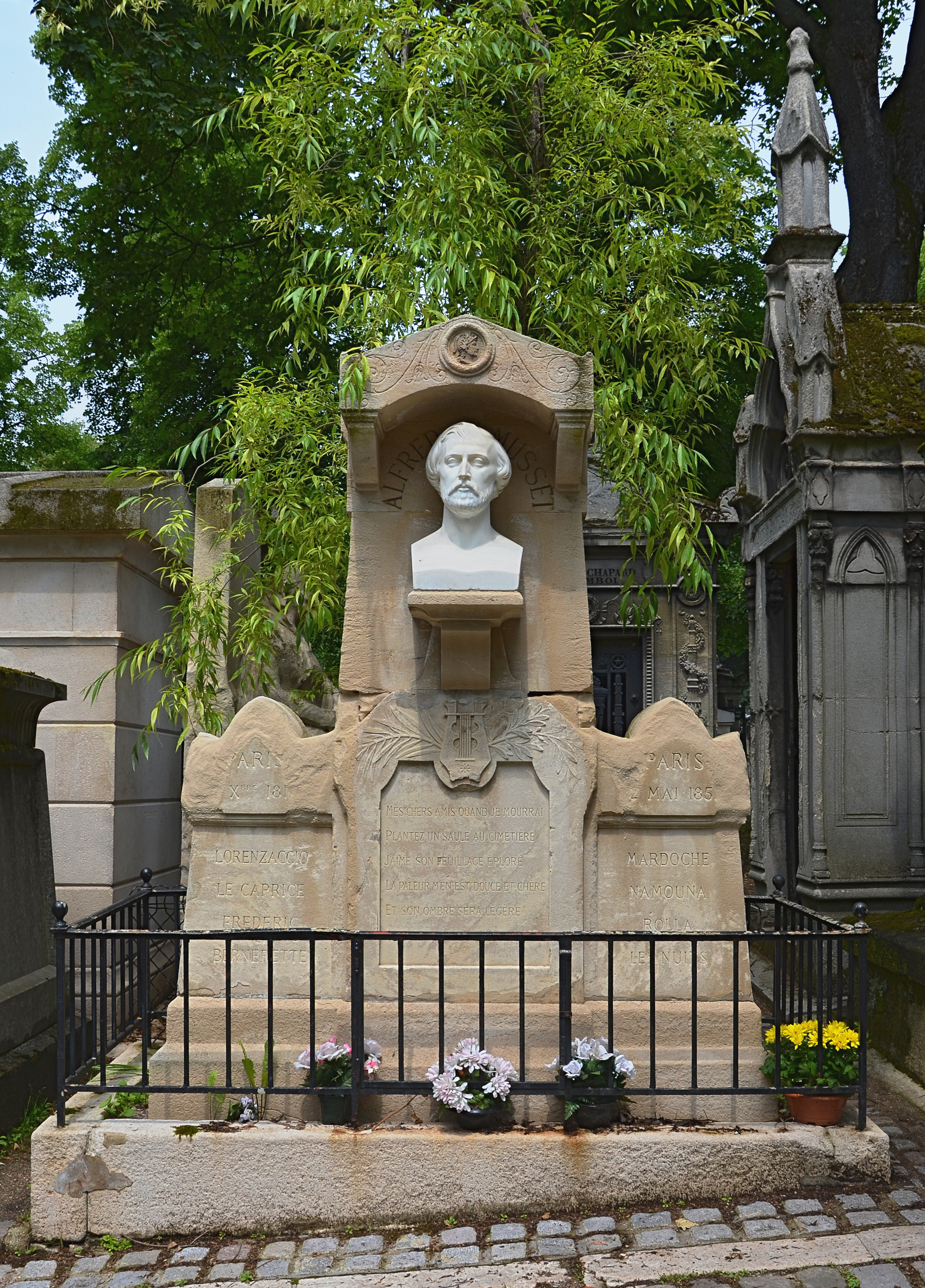
Grave of Alfred de Musset

- Jacques MacDonald – French military commander and Marshal of France
- William Madocks – English landowner and statesman
- Miłosz Magin – Polish composer
- Abdol Majid Majidi – Iranian politician
- Jeanne Margaine-Lacroix – French couturier
- Nestor Makhno – Ukrainian Anarchist revolutionary
- Jacques-Antoine Manuel – French lawyer and statesman
- Auguste Maquet – French author
- Marcellin Marbot – French general
- Marcel Marceau – French mime artist
- Angelo Mariani – French chemist
- Célestine Marié – French opera singer
- André Masséna – French military commander and Marshal of France
- Hippolyte Mège-Mouriès – French chemist and inventor of margarine
- Étienne Méhul – French composer
- Georges Méliès – French filmmaker; produced A Trip to the Moon
- Émile-Justin Menier – French chocolatier
- Henri Menier – French chocolatier
- Antoine Brutus Menier – French chocolatier
- Maurice Merleau-Ponty – French philosopher
- Stuart Merrill – American symbolist poet
- Cléo de Mérode – French dancer
- Danielle Messia – French singer
- Charles Messier – French astronomer, publisher of Messier's catalogue
- Mezz Mezzrow – American Jazz clarinettist and saxophone player
- Teresa Milanollo – Italian violinist and composer, sister of Maria
- Maria Milanollo – Italian violinist; sister of Teresa
- Jules Michelet – French historian
- Borrah Minevitch – American harmonica player
- Amedeo Modigliani – Italian painter and sculptor
- Molière – French playwright
- Gustave de Molinari – Belgian-born economist associated with French laissez-faire liberal economists.
- Silvia Monfort – French comedian
- Gaspard Monge – French mathematician; remains later moved to the Panthéon
- Édouard Monnais – French journalist, theater director, playwright and librettist
- Yves Montand – film actor
- Charles Antoine Morand – French Napoleonic general
- Jim Morrison – American singer-songwriter and lead singer of The Doors, author, and poet. Permanent crowds and occasional vandalism surrounding this tomb have caused tensions with the families of other, less famous, interred individuals. Contrary to rumor, the lease of the gravesite was upgraded from thirty year to perpetual by Morrison's parents; the site is regularly guarded (due to graffiti and other nuisances).
- René Mouchotte – Battle of Britain fighter pilot and Free French Air Force wing commander
- Léon Moussinac – French film critic and theorist
- Jean Moulin – leader of the French Resistance during World War II who went missing after his arrest with several other Resistants at Caluire, Lyon in June 1943. Understood to have died on a train not far from Metz station in July that year, ashes 'presumed' to be his were interred at Père Lachaise after the war and then transferred to the Panthéon in December 1964.
- Marcel Mouloudji – French singer
- Georges Moustaki – French singer-songwriter
- Joachim Murat – King of Naples, French Napoleonic general and Marshal of France.
- Alfred de Musset – French poet, novelist, dramatist; love affair with George Sand is told from his point of view in his autobiographical novel, La Confession d'un Enfant du Siècle

== N ==
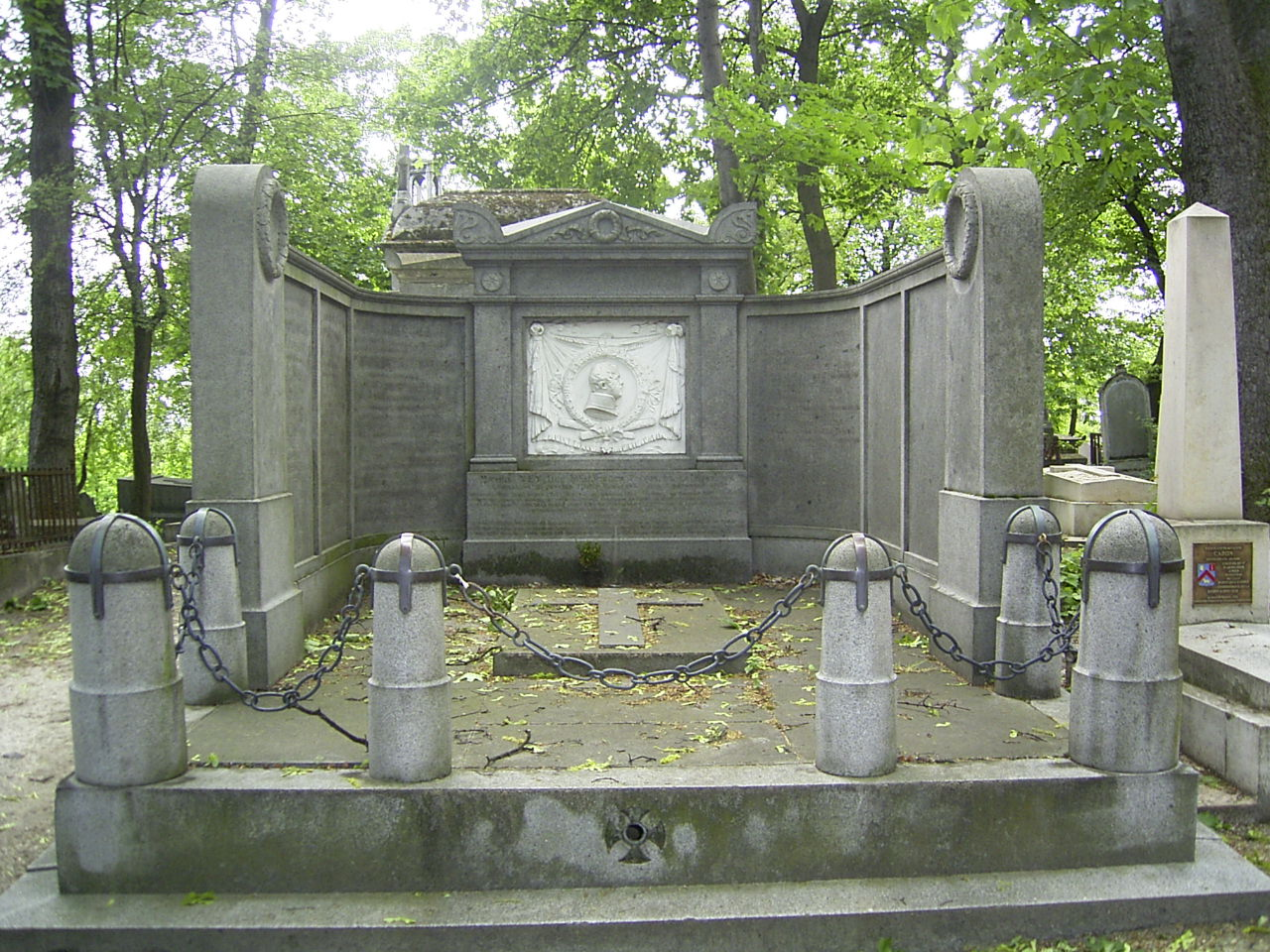
Grave of Michel Ney

- Félix Nadar – a French photographer, caricaturist, journalist, novelist and balloonist
- Étienne de Nansouty – General of Division, commander of the Guard cavalry during the Napoleonic Wars.
- Auguste Nélaton – Personal physician to Napoleon III
- Gérard de Nerval – French poet
- Michel Ney – Marshal of France, Prince of the Moskowa, who fought in the French Revolutionary Wars and the Napoleonic Wars
- Gabrielle Niel - French etcher
- Alwin Nikolais – American choreographer
- Anna de Noailles – French poet
- Charles Nodier – French writer
- Victor Noir – journalist killed by Pierre Napoleon Bonaparte in a dispute over a duel with Paschal Grousset. The tomb, designed by Jules Dalou, is notable for the realistic portrayal of the dead Noir.
- Boghos Nubar – Armenian statesman and diplomat

== O ==
- Krikor Odian – Armenian diplomat and statesman
- Pascale Ogier – French actress
- Virginia Oldoini, Countess of Castiglione – Italian noblewoman and socialite
- Max Ophüls – German film director
- Philippe Antoine d'Ornano – French soldier and political figure who rose to the rank of Marshal of France
- Louis-Guillaume Otto – French diplomat
- Gholam Ali Oveissi – Iranian military commander and statesman

== P ==
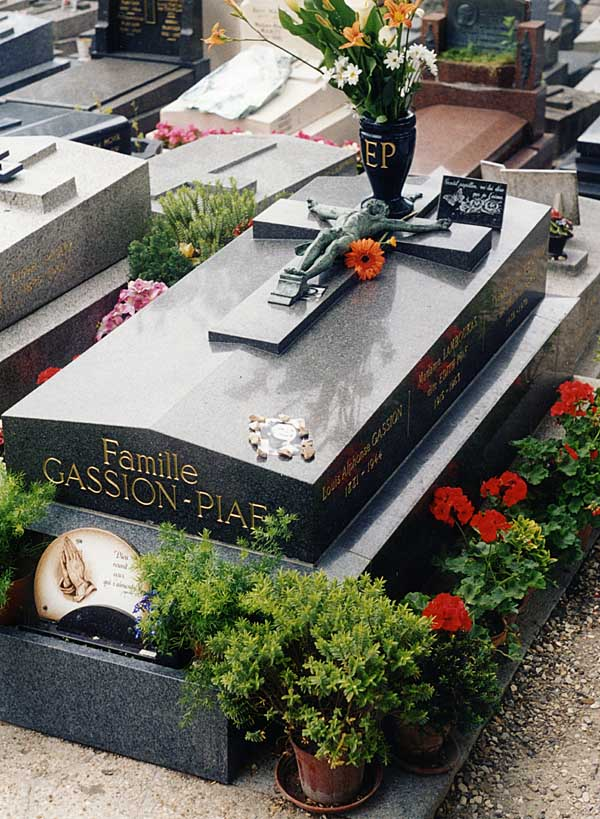
Grave of Édith Piaf

- Camille Alfred Pabst – French painter
- Émile Henry Fauré Le Page – French gunsmith and former owner of Fauré Le Page
- Jean Le Page – French gunsmith and former owner of Fauré Le Page, then known as Le Page
- Trinidad Pardo de Tavera — Filipino physician, historian, and revolutionary
- Antoine Parmentier – French agronomist
- Alexandre Ferdinand Parseval-Deschenes – French admiral
- François-Auguste Parseval-Grandmaison – French poet, uncle of the above
- Christine Pascal – French actress
- Adelina Patti – Spanish-born opera singer
- Robert Herbert, 12th Earl of Pembroke – English aristocrat
- Charles Percier – French Neo-classical architect
- Georges Perec – French author
- Casimir Pierre Périer – French statesman
- Michel Petrucciani – French Jazz pianist
- Édith Piaf – French singer
- Georges Picquart – French general, involved in the Dreyfus affair
- Christian Pineau – French statesman
- Roland Piquepaille – French technology writer
- Camille Pissarro – Danish-French Impressionist painter
- Ignaz Pleyel – pianist, composer, and piano builder
- Siméon Denis Poisson - French mathematician and physicist
- Eugène Pottier – French revolutionary socialist and poet, composed "The Internationale"
- Elvira Popescu – Romanian actress
- Francis Poulenc – French composer
- Antoine-Augustin Préault – French sculptor
- Marcel Proust – French novelist, essayist and critic
- Pierre-Paul Prud'hon – French painter

== Q ==
- Yvonne Marie Elise Toussaint de Quiévrecourt
- Gustave-Augustin Quesneville, French chemist and chemical manufacturer

== R ==
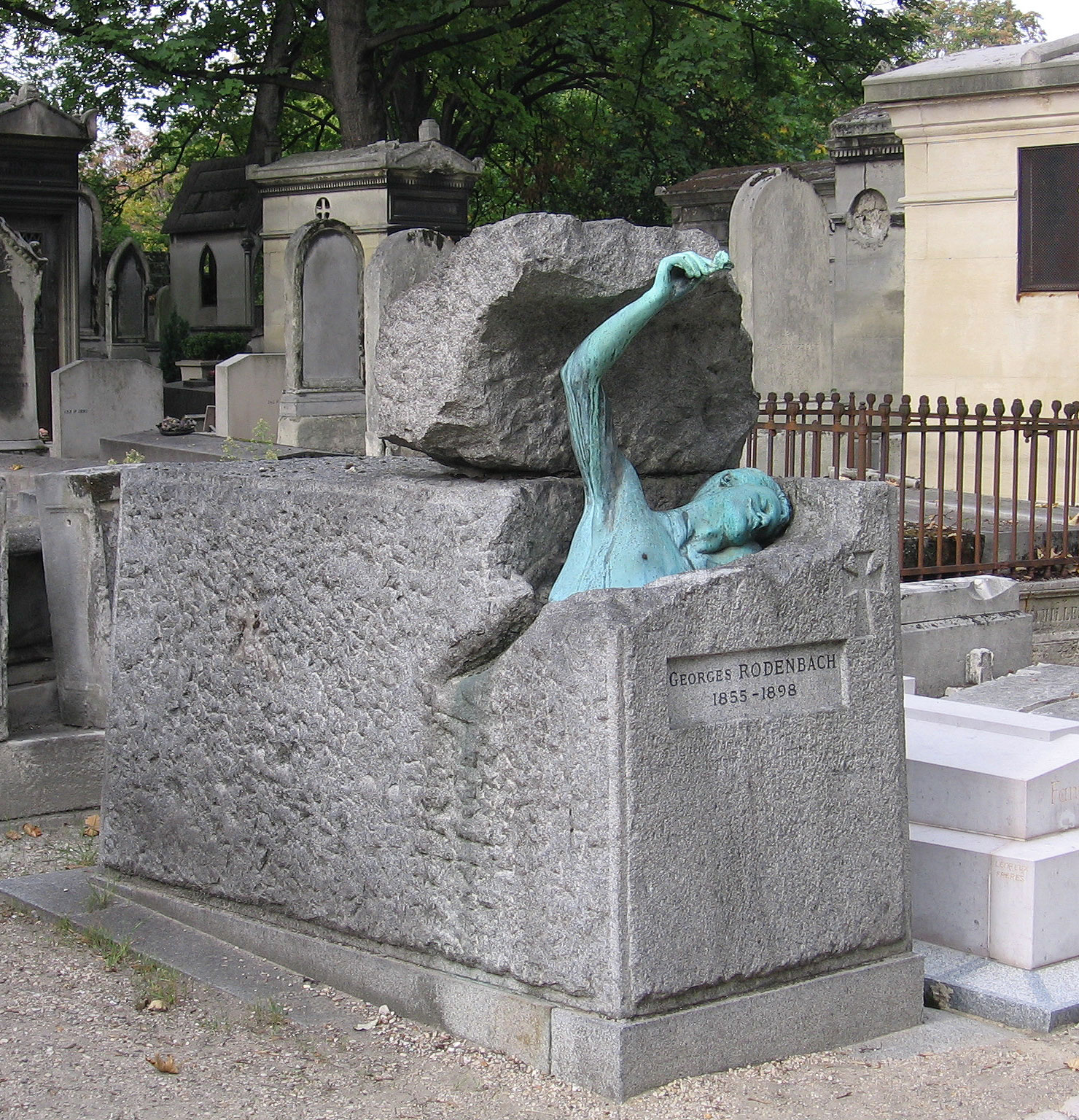
Grave of Georges Rodenbach

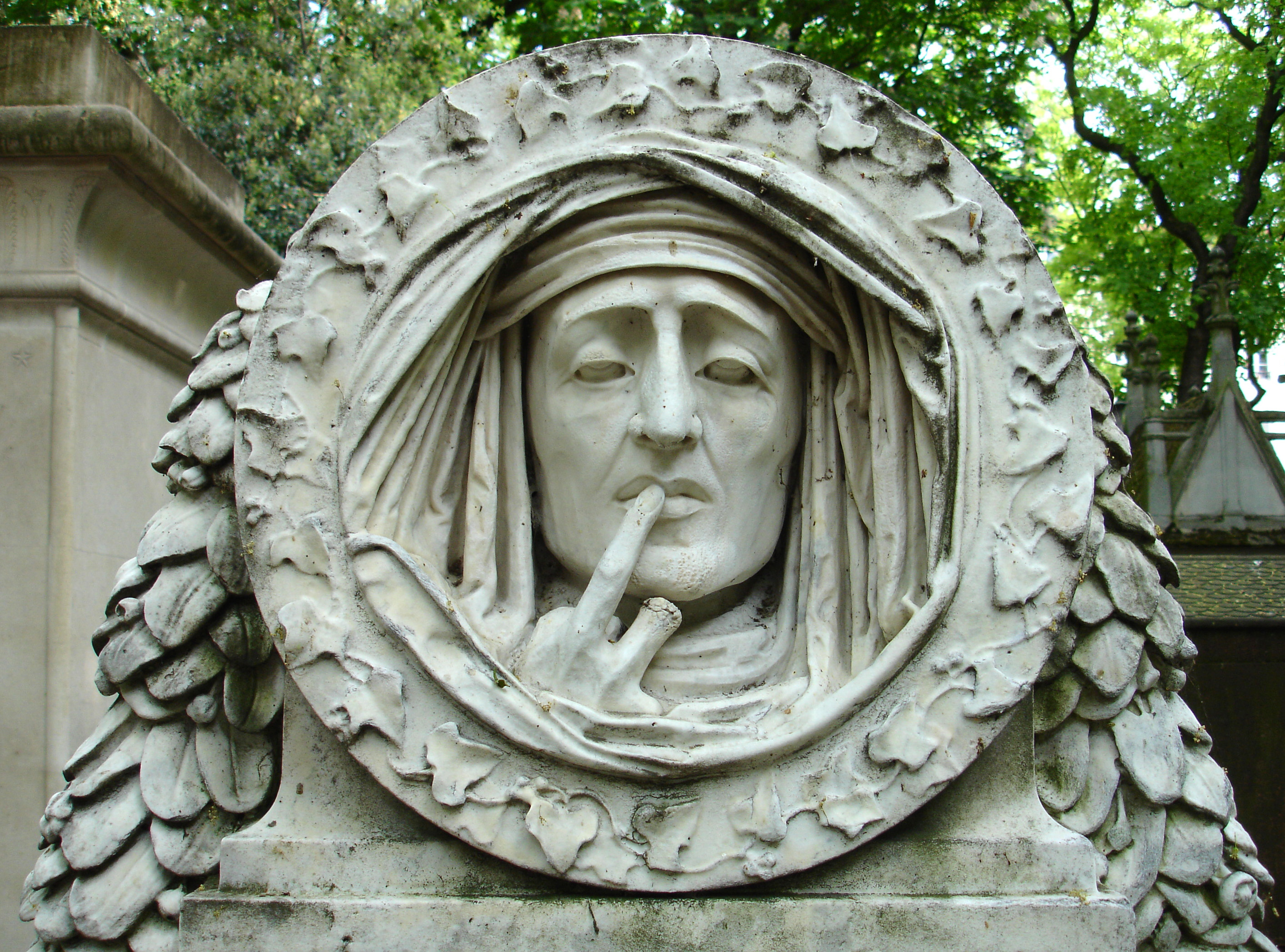
Le Silence (1842) by Antoine-Augustin Préault

- Mademoiselle Rachel – French actress
- François-Vincent Raspail – French scientist and statesman; remains later moved to the Panthéon
- Pierre-Joseph Redouté – Belgian botanic illustrator
- Michel-Louis-Étienne Regnaud de Saint-Jean d'Angély – French politician
- Laure Regnaud de Saint-Jean d'Angély – his wife and Lady of Court
- Jean-Baptiste Regnault – French painter
- Henri de Régnier – French poet
- Frantz Reichel – French sportsman and journalist
- Grace Renzi – American painter
- Norbert Rillieux – American engineer, invented the multiple-effect evaporator
- Étienne-Gaspard Robert – Belgian magician who performed under the stage name of Robertson
- Jacob Roblès – Famous grave for the medallion Silence (1842) by Antoine-Augustin Préault
- Waldeck Rochet – French politician, and General Secretary of the Communist Party of France 1964-1972
- Georges Rodenbach – Belgian poet
- Jean Rollin – French director and novelist
- Jules Romains – French writer
- Robbie Ross - friend of Oscar Wilde (ashes interred in Wilde’s tomb)
- Élisabeth-Paul-Édouard de Rossel – French naval officer, explorer, and hydrographer
- Gioachino Rossini – Italian composer. In 1887, Rossini's remains were moved back to Florence, but the crypt that once housed them (now dedicated to his memory) still stands in Perè Lachaise.
- Edmond James de Rothschild – Baron of the Rothschild family (in the family vault), moved to Ramat HaNadiv later
- James Mayer de Rothschild – (in the family vault in Division 7)
- Salomon James de Rothschild – son of James Mayer de Rothschild (in the family vault)
- Raymond Roussel – writer
- Alphonse Royer – French poet and dramatist

== S ==
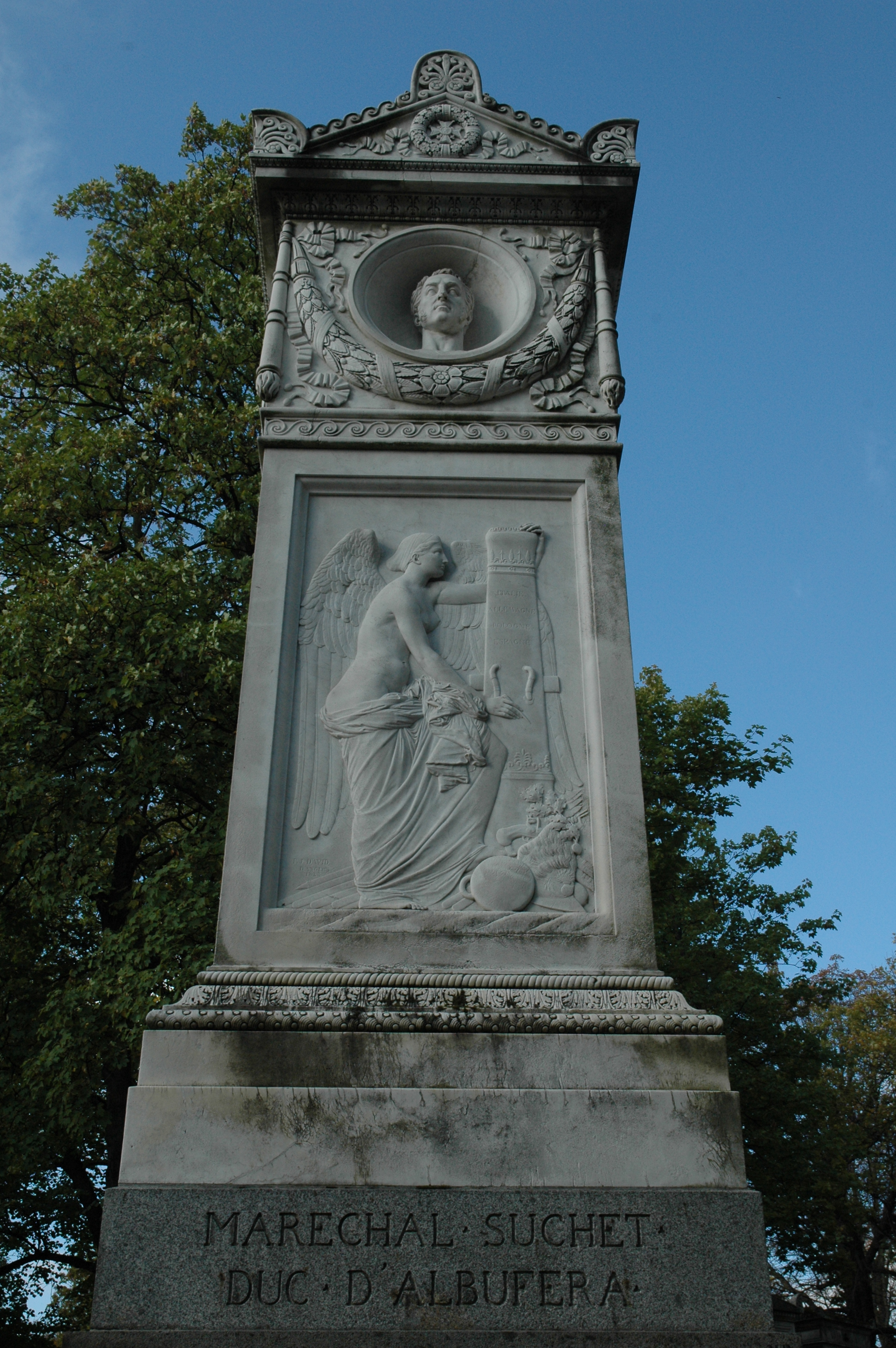
Grave of Louis Suchet

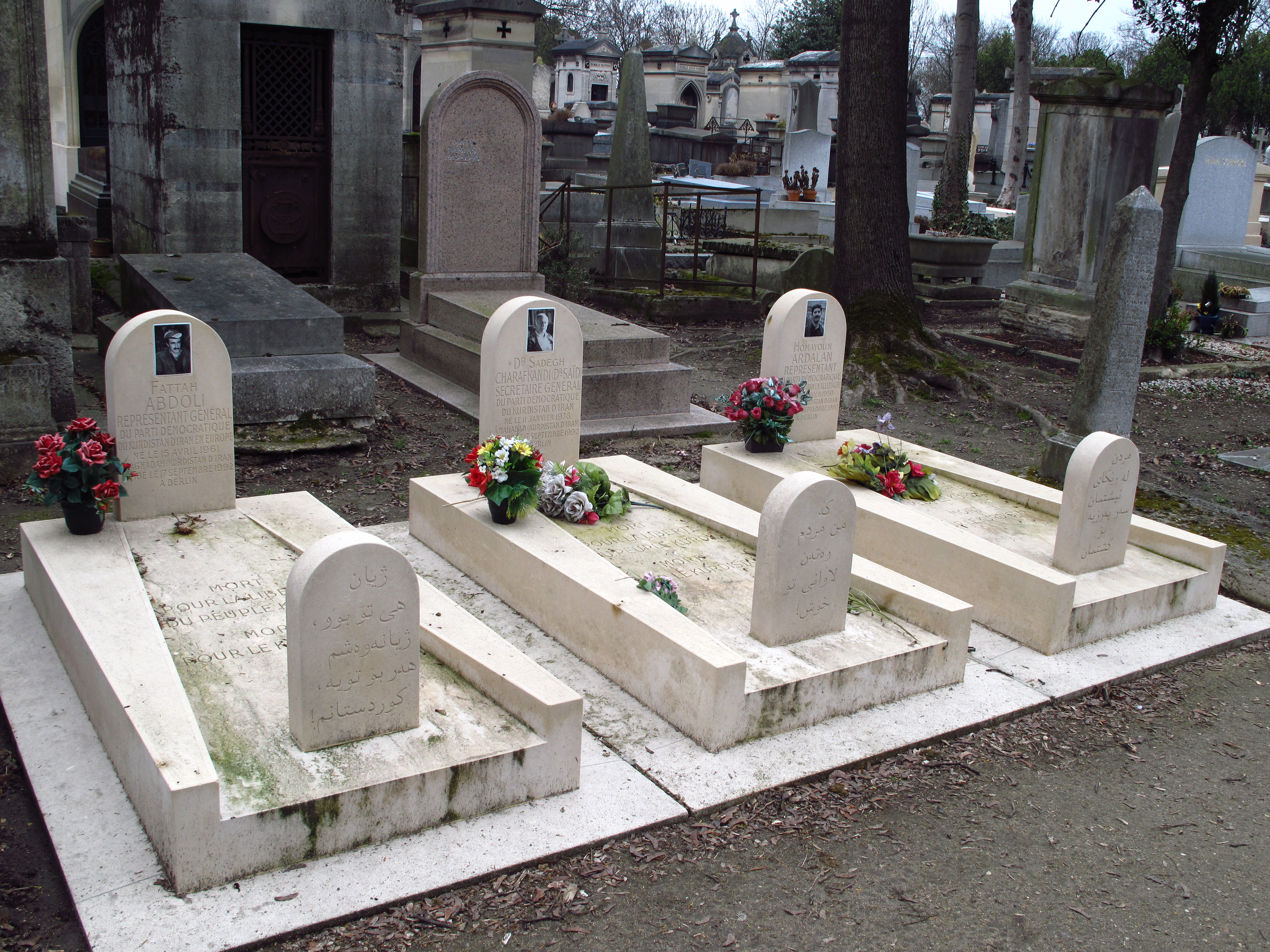
Graves of Fattah Abdoli, Dr.Sadegh Sharafkandi et Homayoun Ardalan, three victims of the Mykonos assassination attempt.

- Kaija Saariaho - Finnish composer
- Dr. Sadegh Sharafkandi – Kurdish politician and leader of Democratic Party of Iranian Kurdistan
- Gholam-Hossein Sa'edi – Iranian socialist novelist and playwright
- Countess Consuelo de Saint-Exupéry – Salvadoran writer, wife of Antoine de Saint-Exupéry
- Étienne Geoffroy Saint-Hilaire – French naturalist
- Claude Henri de Rouvroy, comte de Saint-Simon – French sociologist who founded the "Saint-Simonian" movement
- Henri Salvador – French singer
- Yuliya Samoylova – Russian aristocrat
- Madame Saqui - French tightrope walker
- Anne-Victorine Savigny (Madame de Thèbes) – French fortuneteller
- Jean-Baptiste Say – French economist
- Victor Schœlcher – French statesman known for the abolition of slavery, Schœlcher's remains were transferred to the Panthéon on 20 May 1949
- Eugène Scribe – French librettist and playwright
- Raymond Adolphe Séré de Rivières – French general and military engineer
- Georges-Pierre Seurat – French painter of A Sunday Afternoon on the Island of La Grande Jatte, and father of neo-impressionism
- Adam Seybert - American politician
- Shahan Shahnour – Armenian writer and novelist
- Emmanuel-Joseph Sieyès – French clergyman, philosopher and statesman
- Paul Signac – French painter
- Simone Signoret – Academy-award-winning French actress
- Manuel Silvela y García de Aragón – Spanish writer, lawyer and magistrate
- Sidney Smith – British admiral, of whom Napoleon Bonaparte said "That man made me miss my destiny"
- Albert Soboul – French historian
- Yvonne Sorrel-Dejerine – French neurologist
- Marie Souvestre - French educator
- Joseph Spiess – French inventor of the rigid airship
- Eugène Spuller – French politician, Minister of Foreign Affairs and Minister of Education
- Serge Alexandre Stavisky – French financier
- Gertrude Stein – American author
- John Hurford Stone — British radical political reformer and publisher
- Elisabeta Alexandrovna Stroganova – Francophile Russian aristocrat
- Louis Gabriel Suchet – French military commander and Marshal of France
- Feliks Sypniewski – Polish painter and exiled Restoration of Poland advocate

== T ==
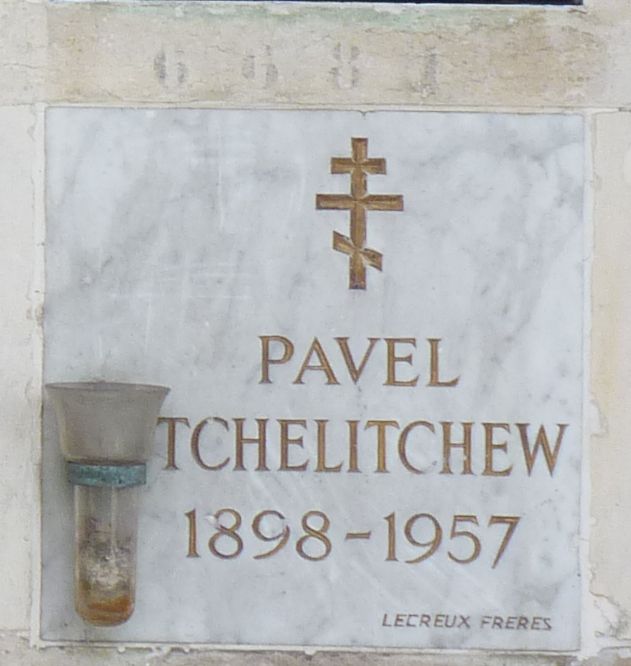
Grave of Pavel Tchelitchew

- Eugenia Tadolini – Italian opera singer
- François-Joseph Talma – French actor
- Pierre Alexandre Tardieu – French engraver
- Gerda Taro – German war photographer and the great love of Robert Capa, also one of the iconographers of the Spanish Civil War. The monument is by Alberto Giacometti.
- J. R. D. Tata – Indian aviation pioneer and former head of Tata Group; Bharat Ratna and Legion of Honour
- Pavel Tchelitchew – Russian artist and painter
- Tapa Tchermoeff – First Prime Minister of the Mountainous Republic of the Northern Caucasus
- Thomas Tellefsen – Norwegian pianist and composer
- Ruben Ter-Minasian – Armenian politician and a revolutionary, member of Armenian Revolutionary Federation ARF Tashnag
- Adolphe Thiers – French historian and statesman
- Maurice Thorez – French Communist politician
- Isaac Titsingh – Dutch surgeon, scholar, VOC trader, ambassador to Qing China and Tokugawa Japan
- Alice B. Toklas – American author, partner of Gertrude Stein, Toklas' name and information is etched on the other side of Stein's gravestone in the same sparse style and font.
- Daniel Toscan du Plantier – French film producer
- Lise Tréhot – French art model notable for Pierre Auguste-Renoir's early Salon period
- Marie Trintignant – French actress
- Maurice Tourneur – French film director
- Rafael Trujillo – former dictator of the Dominican Republic

== U ==
- Marie-Renée Ucciani – French artist
- Gaspard Ulliel – French actor

== V ==
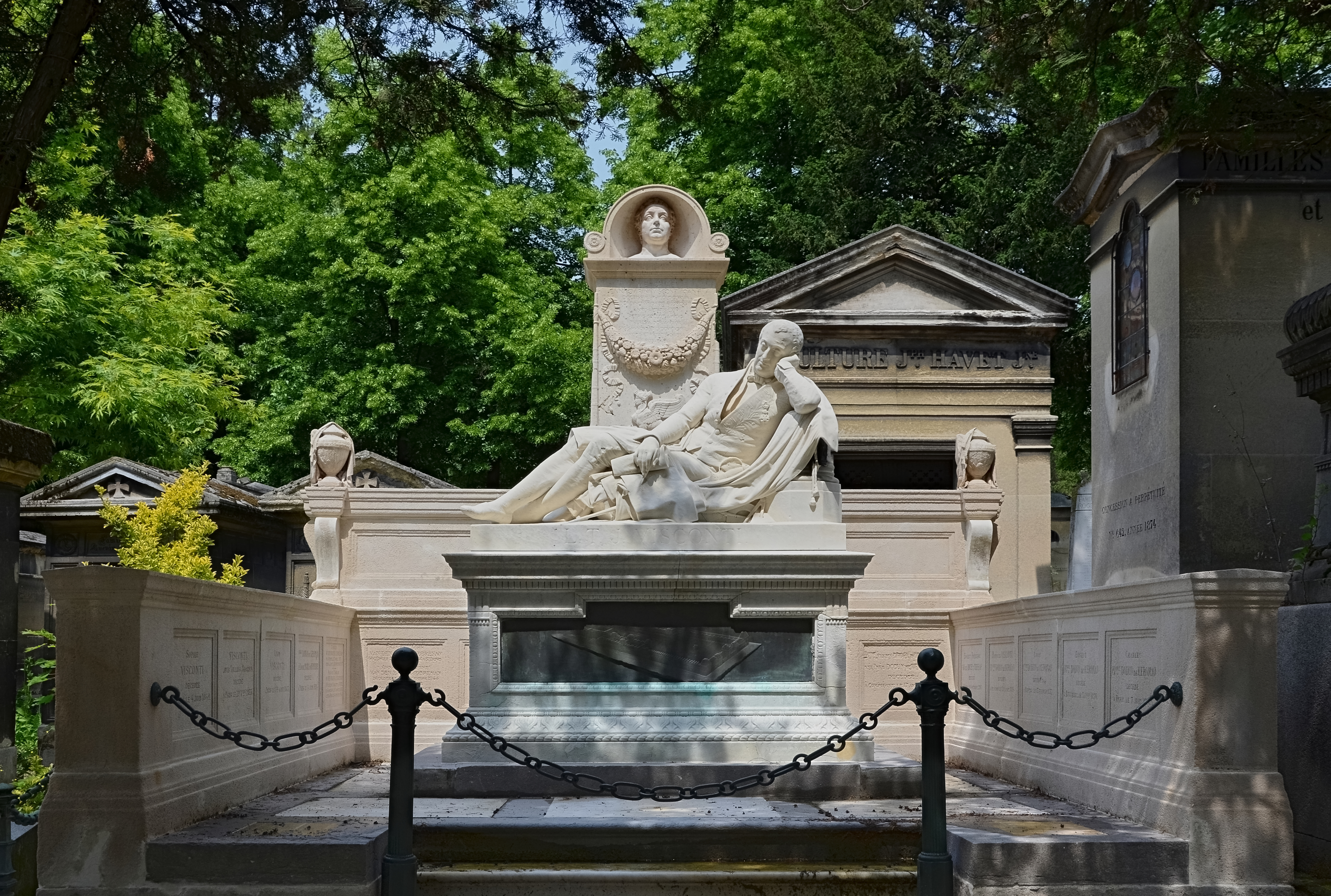
Grave of Louis Visconti

- Paul Vaillant-Couturier – French political journalist
- Monir Vakili – Iranian soprano
- Pierre-Henri de Valenciennes – French painter
- Jules Vallès – French writer
- Bernard Verlhac (Tignous) – French cartoonist killed in the Charlie Hebdo shooting
- Louis Verneuil – French playwright
- Claude Victor-Perrin – French military commander and Marshal of France
- Louis Visconti – French architect best known for designing the modern Louvre and Napoleon's tomb at Les Invalides
- Dominique Vivant, Baron de Denon – French artist, writer, diplomat and archaeologist. Located close to Chopin's grave.
- Louis Vivin – French naive painter.
- Volin – Russian anarchist intellectual.
- Constantin François de Chassebœuf, comte de Volney – French enlightenment philosopher and author of Meditations On The Ruins of Empires, translated by Thomas Jefferson

== W ==
- Émile Waldteufel – French composer
- Countess Marie Walewska – Napoleon's mistress, credited for pressing Napoleon to take important pro-Polish decisions during the Napoleonic Wars. Only her heart is entombed here, in the tomb of the d'Ornano family; her other remains were returned to her native Poland.
- Sir Richard Wallace – English art collector and philanthropist
- Herbert Ward – English sculptor and explorer
- Henry de Waroquier – French visual artist, teacher
- Eduard Wiiralt – Estonian artist
- Oscar Wilde – Irish novelist, poet and playwright. By tradition, Wilde's admirers kiss the Art Deco monument while wearing red lipstick, though this practice will no longer be allowed because of the damage it has caused to his tomb, which had to be repaired and encased in a glass screen. Wilde died in 1900 and was initially buried in the Cimetière de Bagneux. His remains were transferred in 1909 to Père Lachaise. The tomb is also the resting place of the ashes of Robert Ross, who commissioned the monument.
- Helen Maria Williams—English poet, translator, and political writer, who became an expatriate in Paris and chronicled the French Revolution for English readers.
- Jeanette Wohl – French literary editor, longtime friend and correspondent of Ludwig Börne
- Richard Wright – American author, wrote Native Son and other American classics

== Y ==
- Claude-Alexandre Ysabeau – French revolutionary

== Z ==
- Achille Zavatta – French clown
- Félix Ziem – French painter
