= Peter Nahum =

British art dealer and TV personality

- Born: 19 January 1947 (age 79)
- Education: Sherborne School
- Occupations: Art historian and dealer
- Television: Antiques Roadshow
- Awards: FRSA

Peter John Nahum (born 19 January 1947) is an English art dealer, author, lecturer and journalist, best known for his frequent appearances on the BBC television programme Antiques Roadshow, in which he participated from 1981 to 2002. He discovered a Richard Dadd watercolor on the show which was subsequently sold to the British Museum.

== Biography ==
Nahum was educated at Sherborne School and began his career at Peter Wilson's Sotheby's in 1966. In his 17 years with the company, he initiated the Victorian Painting Department at the recently opened Sotheby's Belgravia in 1971 and was head of the British Painting Department (1840 to Contemporary) until his departure in 1984. Having been a Senior Director in the chairman's committee and advisor to the British Rail Pension Fund on Victorian Paintings.[1]

He left Sotheby's in 1984 to open his gallery, The Leicester Galleries, in St James's, London, specializing in premium quality art from the 19th and 20th centuries, as a worldwide adviser for private collections along with museums, and a signatory for Victorian paintings sold to Japan, as well as an official valuer for the DEWHA. He also acts as a known auctioneer for many charities. He is a television personality, academic, lecturer, author, frame designer, and frequent lender of paintings to international exhibitions.

Nahum pioneered the trading website onlinegalleries.com for art and antique dealers globally, C.I.N.O.A., and their national trade associations.

== Public appearances ==
Peter Nahum was a common contributor to the BBC's Antiques Roadshow from 1981 to 2002, retrieving Richard Dadd's lost watercolor Artists Halt in the Desert in 1987, which got sold to the British Museum, and an album of Filipino landscapes sold in 1995 for £240,000. Other BBC Television appearances include Omnibus (1983), with Richard Baker on Richard Dadd's Oberon and Titania, and In at the Deep End (1984), a 45-minute long programme in which he taught television journalist Chris Searle to Auctioneer. He appeared on Breakfast Television, The City Program, The Signals, The Sixty Minutes, and several radio talk shows.. Throughout his career, he has turned counterfeiters to authorities, reporting the Greenhalgh family to the police with full evidence in 1986, although it took another 16 years to convict them., and witnessed the legal definition of fakes and faking. As of this, having appeared in The Artful Codgers made for BBC Four in November 2007.

In 1986, Nahum lectured on "Victorian Painters as Super Stars – Their Public and Private Art", at the Smithsonian Institution, Washington DC, USA, and in 1993 on "The Poetry of Crisis: British Art 1933–1951" at the Victoria & Albert Museum. More recently [when?] he spoke on "The Strange Forces around the Finding of Richard Dadd’s Artist’s Halt in the Desert", for the National Arts Collection Fund. He lectures to student bodies and various other organizations.

== Bibliography ==
Peter Nahum writes for daily press, for antiques magazines and museum & gallery catalogues.

His published works include:

- Sir Lawrence Alma-Tadema, OM RA – A Catalogue of Thirty Five Paintings and Watercolours, Designed and edited by Peter Nahum, Sotheby & Co, 1973
- Prices of Victorian Paintings, Drawings and Watercolours, by Peter Nahum, Carter Nash Cameron, 1976 ISBN 0214202240
- Monograms of Victorian and Edwardian Artists, by Peter Nahum, Victoria Square Press, 1976 ISBN 9780950529509
- Victorian Painters' Monograms, by Peter Nahum, W. Foulsham & Co., 1977
- Jessie M. King and E. A. Taylor – Illustrator and Designer, designed and edited by Peter Nahum, Paul Harris Publishing and Sotheby's Belgravia, 1977
- Cross Section, British Art in The Twentieth Century, Peter Nahum Limited, 1989
- British Art from the Twentieth Century, Peter Nahum Limited, 1989
- Burne-Jones, The Pre-Raphaelites and their Century, 2 volumes, by Hilary Morgan and Peter Nahum, Peter Nahum Limited, 1989
- Michael Rothenstein's Boxes, by Mel Gooding, conceived, designed and edited by Peter Nahum, Art Books International Ltd, 1992
- Burne-Jones A Quest for Love, by Bill Waters, co-authored, edited and published by Peter Nahum, Peter Nahum Ltd, 1993
- Henri Gaudier-Brzeska – A Sculptor Drawings, conceived, designed and edited by Peter Nahum, The Leicester Galleries, 1995
- John Tunnard, His Life and his Work, Alan Peat and Brian Whitton (foreword by Peter Nahum), Scolar Press, London, 1997
- Fairy Folk in Fairy Land, by Peter Nahum, The Leicester Galleries, 1998
- Pre-Raphaelite . Symbolist . Visionary, by Peter Nahum and Sally Burgess, The Leicester Galleries, 2001
- Medieval to Modern, by Peter Nahum and Sally Burgess, The Leicester Galleries, 2003
- The Brotherhood of Ruralists and The Pre-Raphaelites, by Peter Nahum and Sally Burgess, The Leicester Galleries, 2005
- Master Drawings, The Leicester Galleries, 2006
- Paul Raymond Gregory; My Secret Book, designed and written by Peter Nahum, The Leicester Galleries, 2007
- Ancient Landscapes – Pastoral Visions: Samuel Palmer to the Ruralists, by Anne Anderson, Robert Meyrick and Peter Nahum, Southampton City Art Gallery, April–June 2008; then touring Victoria Gallery Bath, Falmouth Art Gallery and Cube Gallery Plymouth until 19 December 2008

=== Contributions ===
- Nomi Rowe, In Celebration of Cecil Collins, Visionary Artist and Educator, London 2008, pages 49 – 51
- Past and Present: Edward Burne-Jones, His Medieval Sources and Their Relevance to his Personal Journey, by William Waters and Peter Nahum, in Edward Burne-Jones: The Earthly Paradise, Staatsgalerie Stuttgart and Kunstmuseum Bern, pages 179–203, Hartje Cantz, Ostfildern 2009

=== DVD documentary ===
- Paul Raymond Gregory's RingQuest, Narrated by Julian Sands; Narration written by Peter Nahum; Executive producer: Peter Nahum; Produced, directed and edited by Mathias Walin; Photography and sound by Martin Sundström.
