= Gustave-Augustin Quesneville =

French chemist and publisher

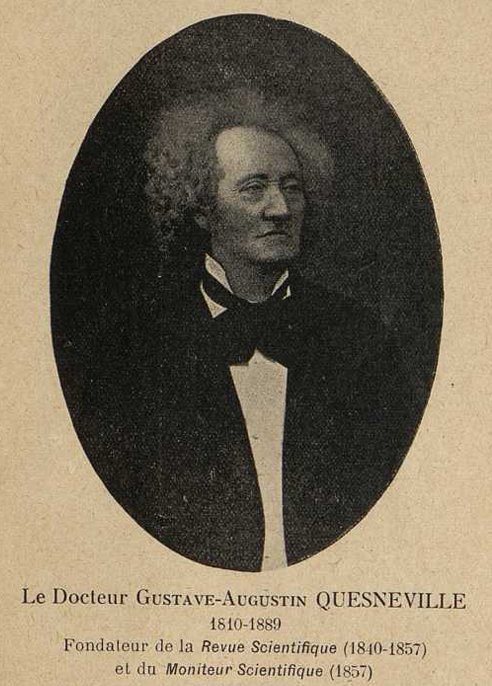
- Born: January 1, 1810; Paris, France
- Died: November 14, 1889 (aged 79); Paris, France
- Scientific career
- Fields: Chemistry

Gustave-Augustin Quesneville (January 1, 1810 – November 14, 1889) was a French chemist, chemical manufacturer, and journal editor, best known for the monthly Moniteur Scientifique Du Docteur Quesneville.

Quesneville was born in Paris in 1810. He was a student of Vauquelin and Chevreul and later succeeded Vauquelin as head of the Manufacture de produits et de reactifs chimiques established by Fourcroy and Vauquelin and bought by Gustave-Augustin's father, Jean Baptiste Quesneville in 1822. In 1834 he received a doctorate in medicine, (Note: Doctorate thesis Essai sur L'apoplexie sanguine ou hemorrhagie cerebrale was presented on August 27, 1934 before the Faculte De Medicine De Paris) but he did not practice and instead he engaged in the application of science to industry.

His scientific contributions were mostly short and practical notes in chemical processes, but his principal work was the publication of the Moniteur Scientifique, an important monthly particularly devoted to theoretical and applied chemistry, of which he was editor, publisher, and director until his death. He started his publication in 1840 under the title Revue scientifique et industrielle. In 1844 it was retitled to Revue scientifique et industrielle, ou travaux des savants et des manufacturiers de la France, de l'Allemagne at de l'Angleterre. In 1857 was renamed to Moniteur Scientifique du chimiste et du manufacturier. Eventually it was titled Le Moniteur Scientifique Du Docteur Quesneville.

Of other publishing activities, in 1842 he was in charge of publishing of Ferdinand Hoefer's Histoire de la chimie.

Of political views, Quesneville was a republican.

Quesneville died in 1889 in Paris. His body was embalmed following the procedure of Dr. Gannal. Gustave Quesneville rests at the Pere Lachaise Cemetery together with his wife, born Charlotte Durey (died in 1892).

Auguste Laurent, a founder of the organic chemistry, published his seminal papers in Revue scientifique du Dr. Quesneville during 1840-1845.
