= Suzanne Eisendieck =

German painter

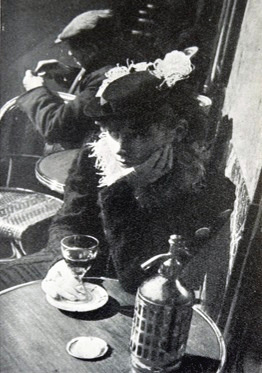
- Eisendieck in 1936
- Born: Suzanne Eisendick; 14 November 1906; Danzig (now Gdańsk Poland)
- Died: 15 June 1998 (aged 91); Paris, France
- Resting place: Père Lachaise Cemetery, Paris; 48.8600°N 2.3960°E
- Education: Berlin State Academy for Fine and Applied Arts
- Known for: Painting, drawing
- Movement: Post-Impressionism
- Spouse: Dietz Edzard (1893–1963)

Suzanne Eisendieck (14 November 1906 — 15 June 1998) was a German Post-Impressionist painter native of Danzig.

== Biography ==
Suzanne Eisendieck was born at Holzraum Platz 2B in Danzig (now Gdańsk in Poland) to German parents Karl Eisendick and Anna Eisendick (née Klegus).

At the age of 12, Suzanne Eisendieck became one of the youngest pupils of the painter Fritz August Pfuhle. When she was 21, she went to study for three years at Berlin State Academy for Fine and Applied Arts, attending the class of Maximilian Klewer, and whilst there took part in an exhibition with over 1400 objects displayed in a group collection. Only 9 were sold and 3 of these were her canvases. This successful show in Berlin enabled her later to travel to Paris, where she took residence in a tiny attic of Latin Quarters near the Place St. Michel and started painting. It was a continuous financial struggle for Suzanne until one friend organised for Madame Zak to visit her small studio. She immediately purchased 6 of her paintings and put them in her gallery, Galerie Zak, at the Place Saint Germain des Près. There they were so much admired that she arranged for the first exhibition of Suzanne Eisendieck works. That was followed later by few others in the Leicester Galleries in London. This was also the end of bitter hardship for young artist and the start of great success.

Artistically, her work was inspired by the French Impressionists and is in many private collections, mostly in America. The majority of her drawings are rapid chalk or pen sketches due to the high demand for new artworks. Suzanne Eisendieck painted uniquely using oil paint and occasionally pastels.

She became best of friends with Dietz Edzard. It was he who originally introduced Madame Zak to her art. They started painting so much alike that some had difficulty in telling their work apart.

In 1938 Suzanne Eisendieck and Dietz Edzard (1893–1963) got married. They had two children whilst living in Paris, Christine Edzard-Goodwin (1945) married to Richard Goodwin (Sands Films, London) and Angélica Edzard-Károlyi (1947) married to Georges Károlyi, Hungarian ambassador to France (Joseph Károlyi Foundation, Hungary).

Suzanne Eisendieck died in Paris in 1998 and was buried in the Père Lachaise Cemetery.

== Gallery ==
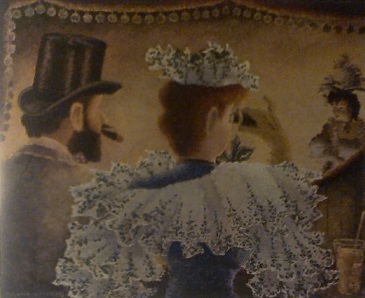
Leicester Galleries, London (1936) "Au Theatre"

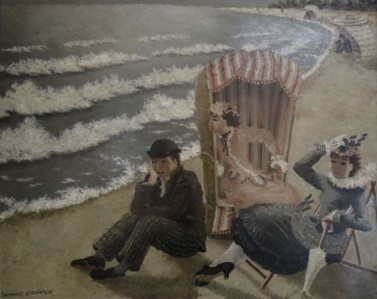
Leicester Galleries, London (1936) "Plage Orageuse"

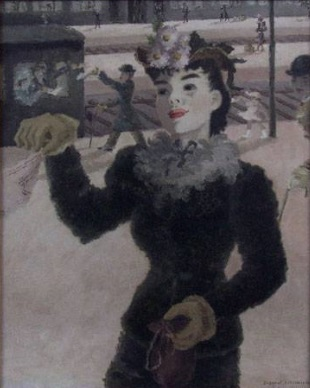
Marie Harriman Gallery, NY (1937) "A la gare"

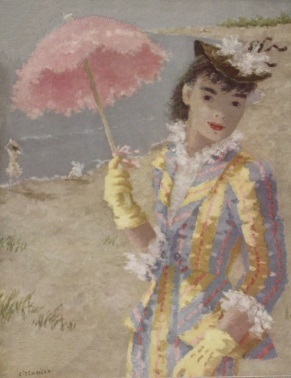
(1938) "Straw scoop"

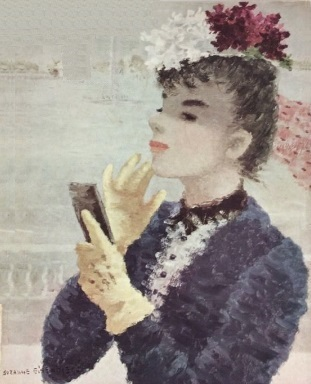
(1938) "At Bonwit Teller" Marshall Field

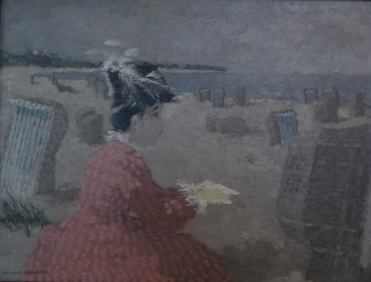
(c.1938-1939) "Zoppot Beach"

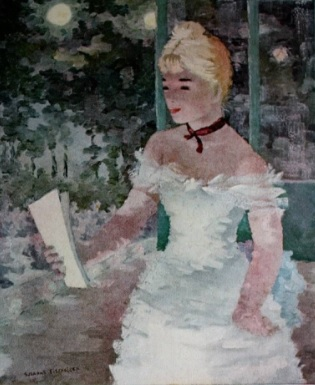
(1941) terminus ante quem

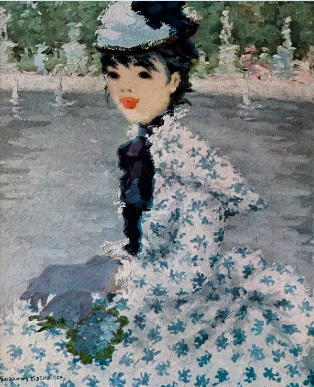
(1947) "The Tuileries Gardens"

== Exhibitions ==
- 1929 – Jury Free Art Show, Berlin
- 1932 – Madame Zak at the Place Saint Germain des Près, Paris
- 1934 – Leicester Galleries, London
  1936 – Leicester Galleries, London
  1938 – Leicester Galleries, London
- 1937 – Marie Harriman Gallery, New York
  1939 – Marie Harriman Gallery, New York
  1940 – Marie Harriman Gallery, New York
- 1942 – Galerie Benezit, Paris
- 1946 – Perls Galleries, New York
  1948 – Perls Galleries, New York
  1949 – Perls Galleries, New York
- 1950 – Gallery Vigeveno, Los Angeles
- 1954 – Exposition Publique Tableaux Moderners, Paris
- 1955 – Galerie Petrides, Paris
- 1956 – O'Hana Gallery, London
- 1959 – Hammer Galleries, New York
- 1959 – Findlay Galleries, New York
- 1959 – Findlay Galleries, Chicago
- 1959 – Findlay Galleries, Palm Beach
- 1961 – Adams Gallery, London
- 1962 – Galerie Abels, Cologne

== Literature ==
- "Juryfreie Kunstschau Berlin 1929". Malerei, Graphik, Plastik und Architektur; Landes-Ausstellungsgebäude am Lehrter Bahnhof; Verlag, Berlin 1929 (in German)
- "The Studio" Suzanne Eisendieck — Individualist. Vol. CXII – Nr. 522. September 1936
- "Art Digest" Dainty Femininity in Eisendieck Exhibit. 1 December 1937
- "Time" Suzannes. 13 December 1937
- "Allgemeines Lexicon der Bildenden Kunstler des XX. Jahrhundrerts", E. A. Seemann, Leipzig, 1953–62, vol. 2, p. 25 (in German)
- "Fritz Pfuhle". Eun Maler aus Danzig von Eberhard Lutze; Holzner Verlag, Würzburg 1966 (in German)
- "Suzanne Eisendieck" Peintures Récentes, Préface de Waldemar George 1967 (in French)
- "Emmanuel Bénézit, Dictionnaire des Peintres, Sculpteurs, Dessinateurs et Graveurs, Paris, 1976, vol. 4, p. 134 (in French)
- "Benezit Dictionary of Artists", Gründ 2006 Edition Paris, Vol. 5, p. 130
