= Leicester Galleries =

Art gallery in London

Coordinates: 51.5181°N 0.1232°W

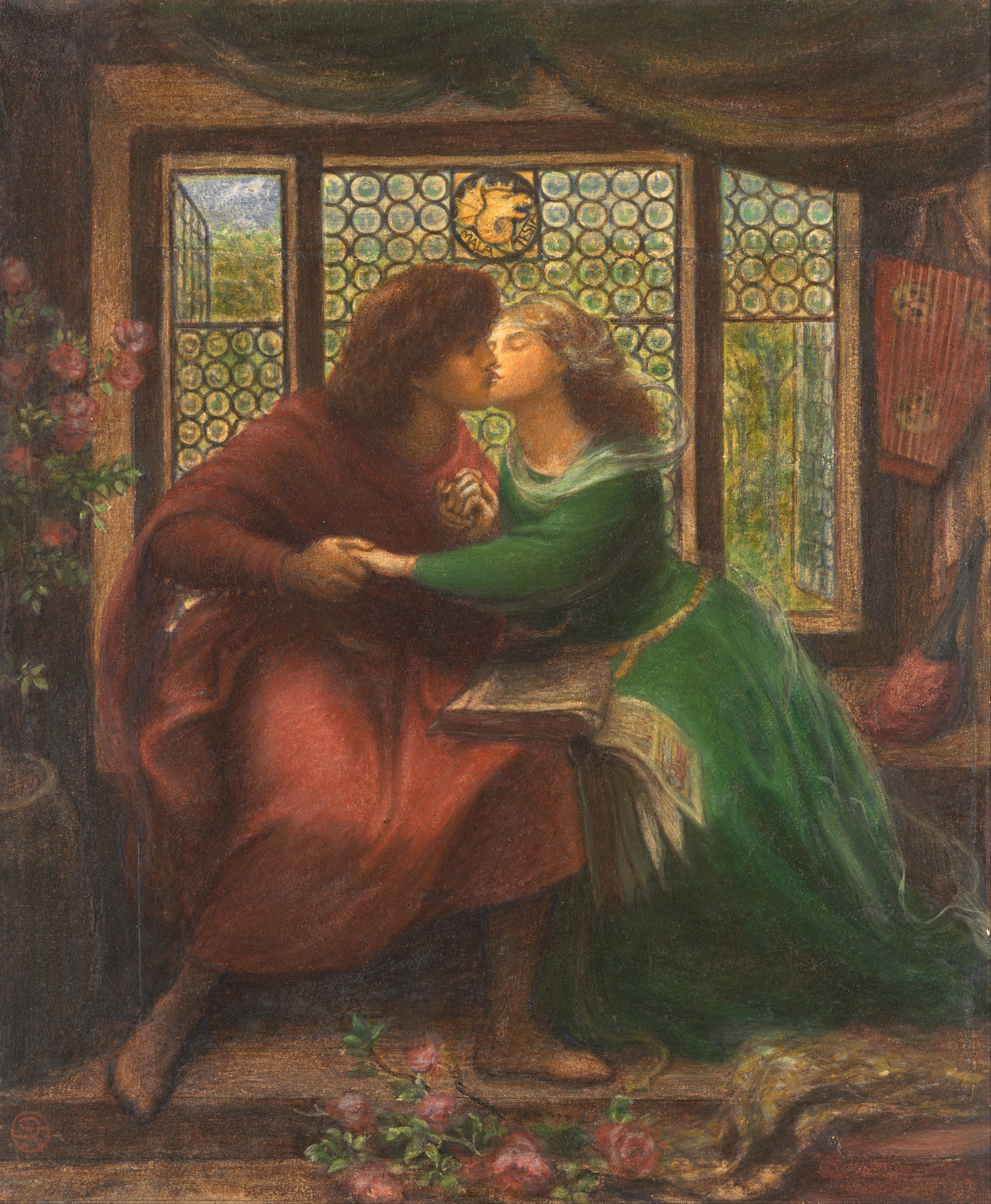
Dante Gabriel Rossetti's Paolo and Francesca da Rimini (1867) was shown at the original Leicester Galleries

Leicester Galleries was an art gallery located in London from 1902 to 1977 that held exhibitions of modern British, French and international artists' works. Its name was acquired in 1984 by Peter Nahum, who operates "Peter Nahum at the Leicester Galleries" in Mayfair.

== History ==
In July 1902, Cecil and Wilfred Phillips opened a gallery in Leicester Square. The following year Ernest Brown joined the organisation, and they became Ernest Brown and Phillips Ltd, operating the Leicester Galleries. (Note: The Ernest Brown and Phillips site states that the galleries were found in 1903. According to the London Galleries Project: "Although many sources date the founding of the Leicester Gallery to 1903, a list of exhibitions beginning in July 1902 was published in The Year’s Art 1903 (see "Selected exhibitions"). The Phillips brothers are identified as the proprietors, but by the following year Ernest Brown has joined the firm and they are identified as "Ernest Brown and Phillips" from then on.") The exhibited works of modern British and French painters, including John Lavery, Robert Medley, Mark Gertler and Henry Moore. Works exhibited included drawings, watercolours, paintings, prints and sculptures. Every one of the more than 1,400 exhibitions had a printed catalogue. Emerging artists - such as William Roberts, Christopher Nevinson, David Bomberg, and Jacob Epstein - were recognized in their annual "Artists of Fame and Promise" exhibition. Henri Matisse, Picasso, Camille Pissarro and Suzanne Eisendieck had their first solo exhibitions in England at Leicester Galleries. It was also known for showcasing and developing the careers of illustrators such as Arthur Rackham and Edmund Dulac.

The gallery experienced several moves, first to South Audley Street and then Cork Street in Mayfair. The last "Leicester Galleries" show was held in July 1975 and it traded until 1977.

In 1984 the gallery name was acquired by Peter Nahum, who operates the "Peter Nahum at the Leicester Galleries" in Mayfair.

== Exhibitions ==
- An index of 1422 catalogues of exhibitions of European Modern Art and 20th Century British Art, held between 1902 and 1977 at the Leicester Galleries, published by Ernest Brown & Phillips Ltd.

== Gallery ==
Selection of works shown at the galleries:

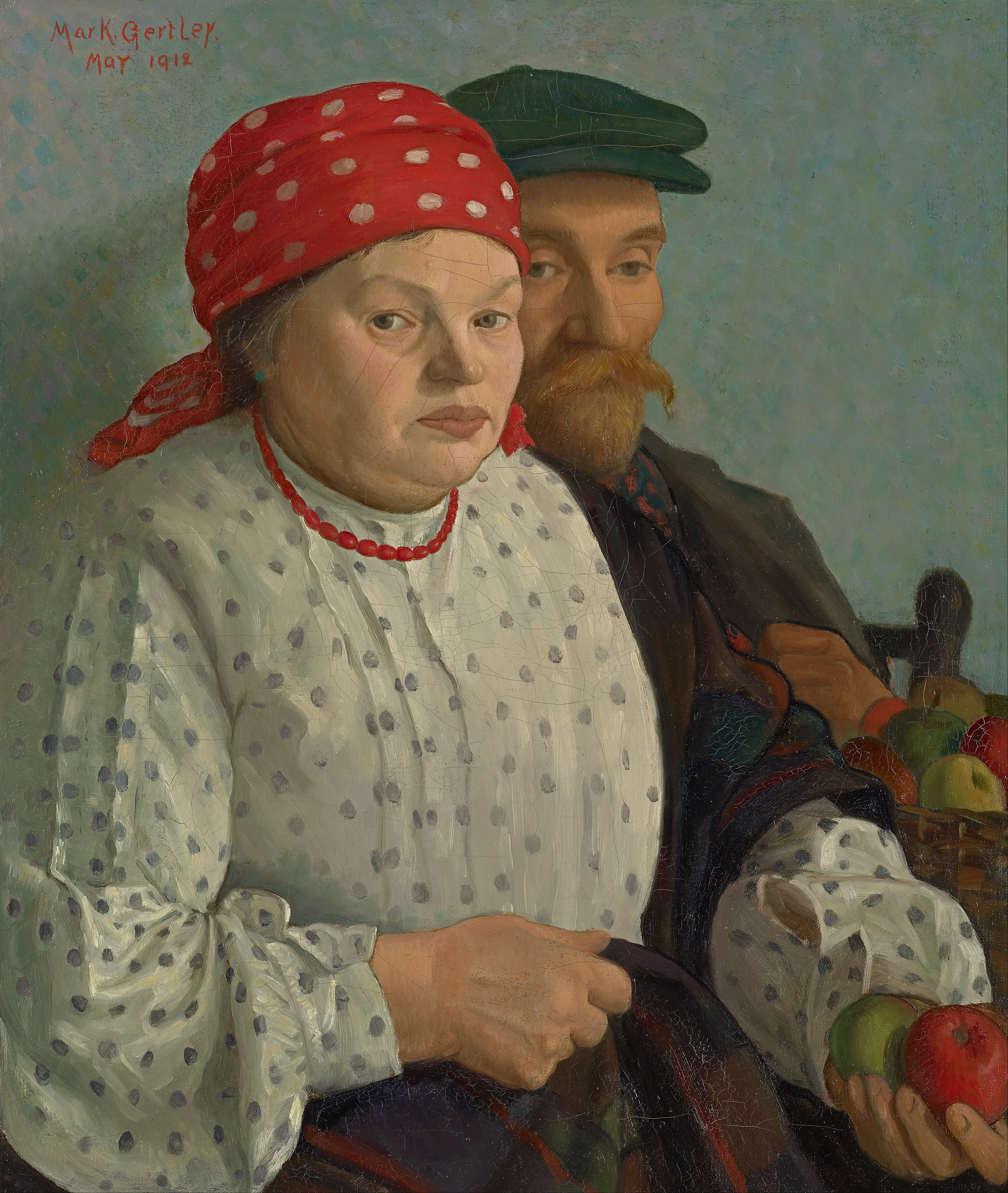
Mark Gertler, The apple woman and her husband, 1912

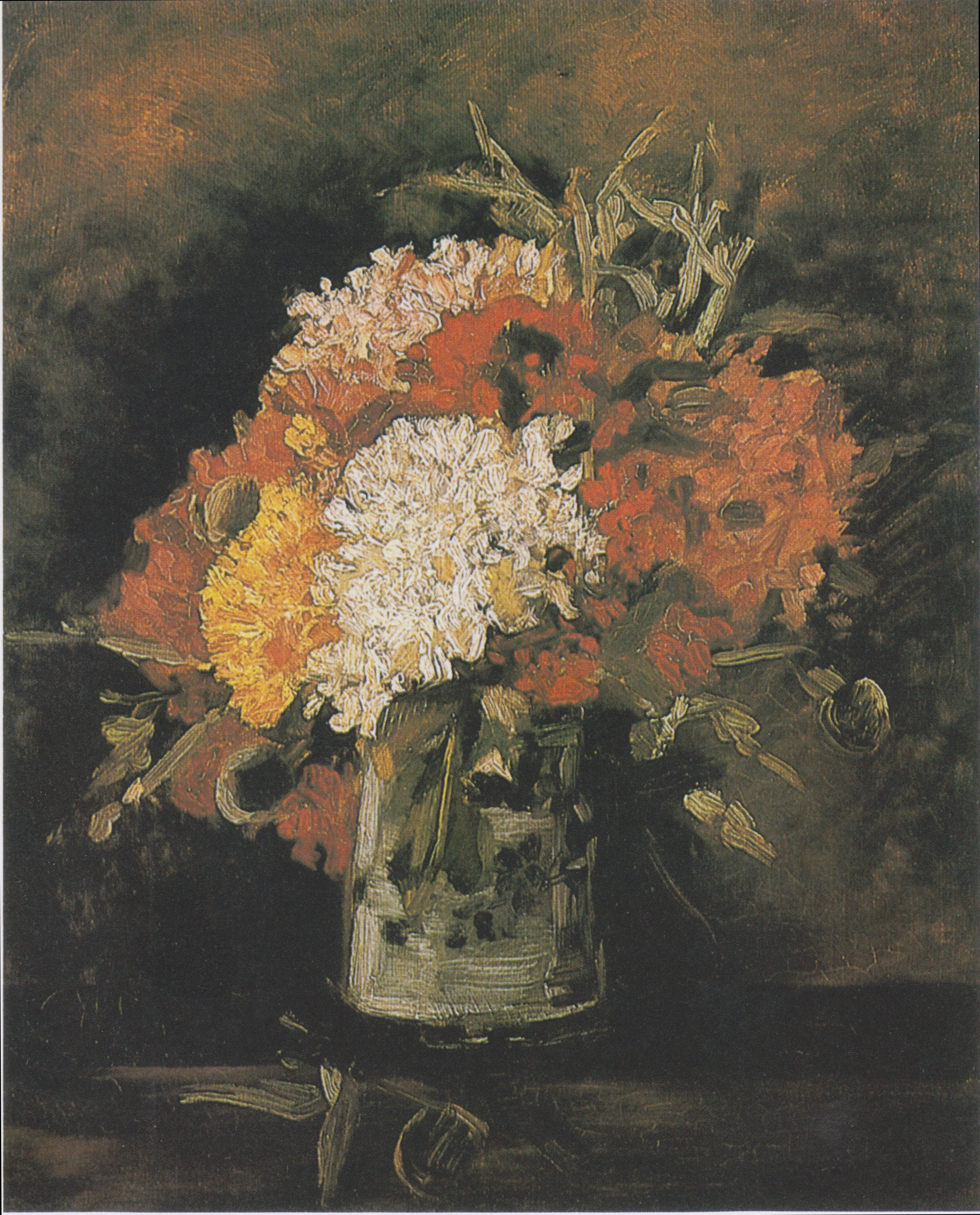
Vincent van Gogh, Vase with Carnation, Summer 1886

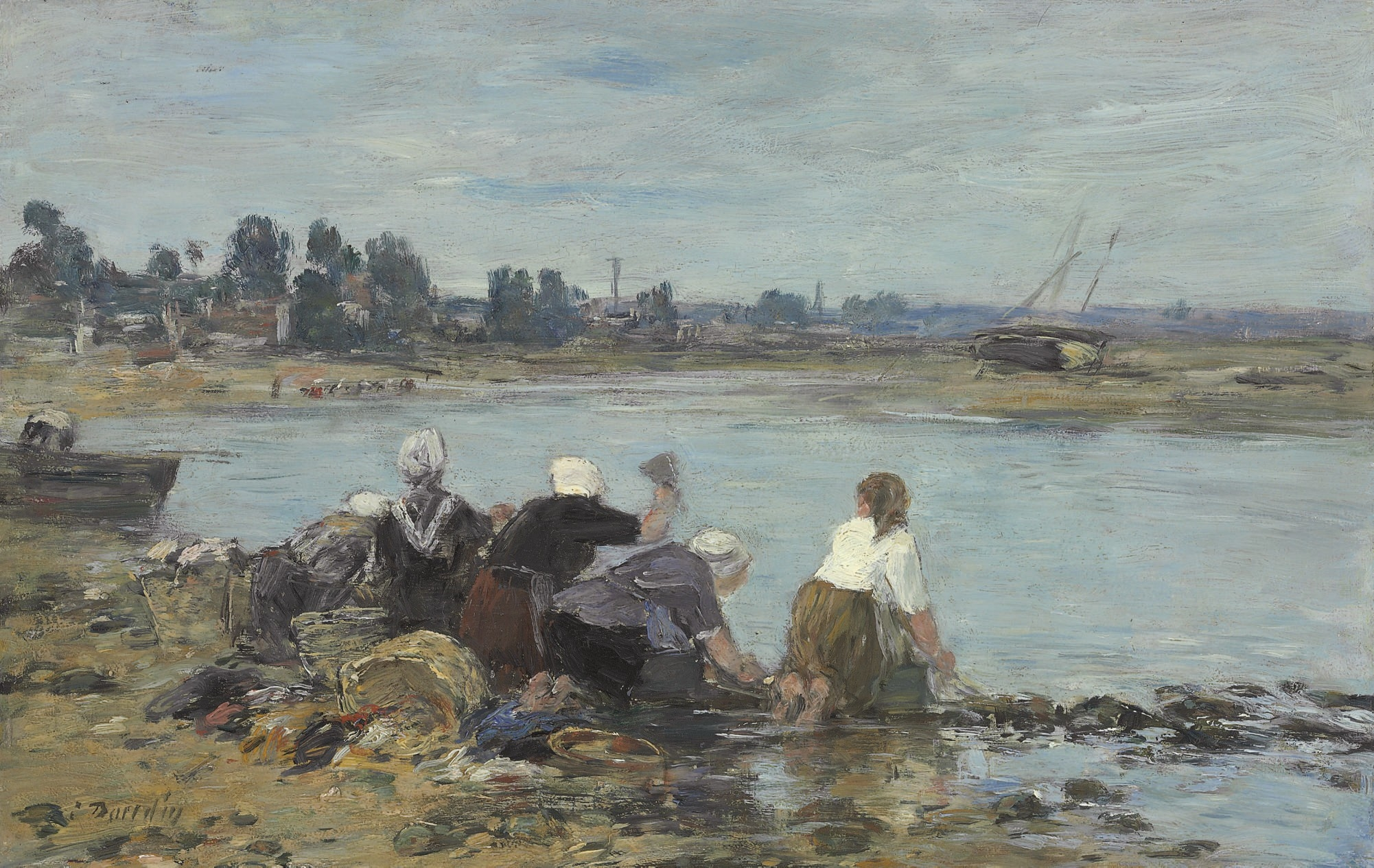
Eugène Boudin, Laveuses au bord de la Touques, between 1888 and 1895

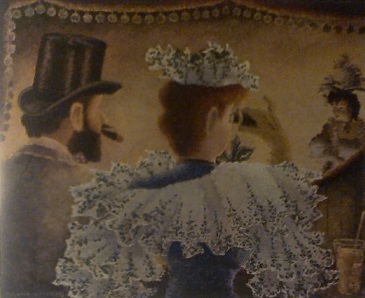
Suzanne Eisendieck, Au Theatre 1936
