= Jean-Nicolas Gannal =

French pharmacist and inventor

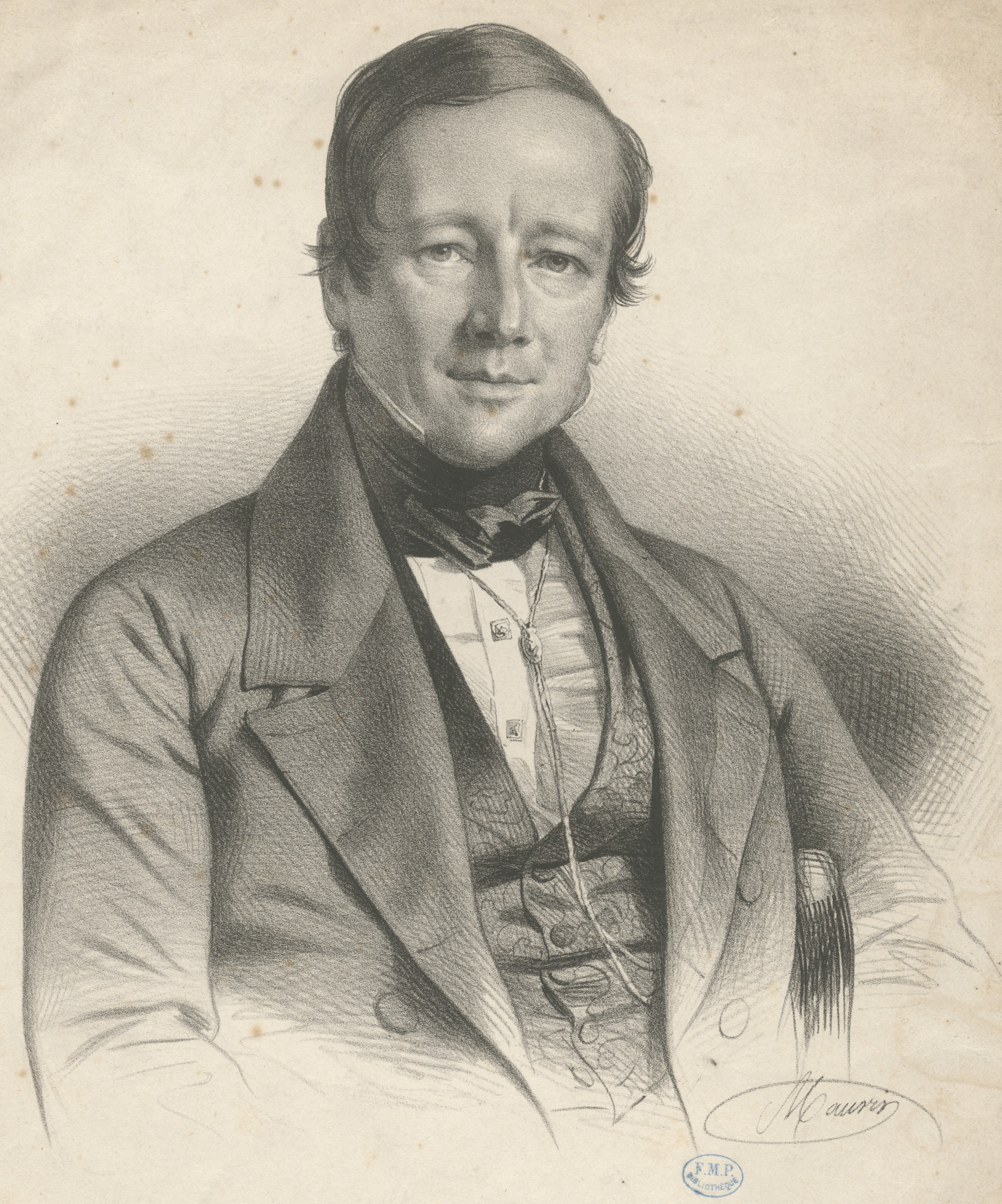
Jean-Nicolas Gannal

Jean-Nicolas Gannal, (Saarlouis, 27 July 1791 – Paris, 13 January 1852) was a French pharmacist, chemist, inventor and military doctor.

== Biography ==
Gannal began his career as a pharmacist's apprentice. He was in the medical corps of the French Army from 1808 to 1812, during the Napoleonic Wars. He was at Metz, Hannover, and Lübeck. In 1812, because he spoke fluent German, he was assigned to Marshal Davout's headquarters as an interpreter. Gannal was captured by the Russians on 10 December 1812 and interned at Vilnius. He escaped and returned to French headquarters in Dresden on 19 June 1813 and was then redeployed. Gannal claimed to have been captured seven times in 18 months, the last time by the Austrians. He returned from captivity to Paris on 5 October 1815. After demobilization, he jointed the chemical laboratory at the École polytechnique, where he remained until 1818. He was an assistant preparator (préparateur adjoint) to Gay-Lussac and Thénard. He worked for the chemical laboratory of the Académie des Sciences.

Gannal then developed methods for industry and went into business for himself.

His contributions to technical chemistry included a method of refining borax, the introduction of elastic rollers formed of gelatin and sugar for use in printing, and processes for manufacturing glue and gelatin, lint, white lead, &c. The Institute awarded him a Montyon prize in 1827 for his advocacy of chlorine as a remedy in pulmonary phthisis, and again in 1835 for his discovery of the efficacy of solutions of aluminium acetate and chloride for preserving anatomical preparations. In the latter part of his life he turned his attention to embalmment, his method depending on the injection of solutions of aluminium salts into the arteries.

He published his book Histoire des Embaumements in 1838. This work was translated into English in 1840 and was the basis for establishing the embalming method called in the U.S.A. the Gannal process ("procédé Gannal").

He married Theresia Demar; among their children were two physician-pharmacists. Jean-Nicolas Gannal was succeeded in his embalming business by a son and a grandson. In 1903, their company embalmed the body of Elie Faure, the famous historian of art. According to the company's records, the Gannal process was used to embalm the bodies of Hortense Schneider, Anna de Noailles, Paul Doumer, maréchal Joffre and many other celebrities.

Jean-Nicolas Gannal died in Paris on 13 January 1852, at his residence at 6 rue de Seine, and was buried at cimetière du Montparnasse.

== See also ==
- Alfredo Salafia

== Bibliography ==
- Jean-Nicolas Gannal, Histoire des Embaumements et de la préparation des pièces d'anatomie normale 1838 : l'édition de 1841 est librement consultable sur Googlebooks.
