= Anne Bignan =

French poet and translator

Anne Bignan (1795–1861) was a French poet and translator, known for his translations of Homer. His father, Jean-Louis-Dominique Bigna de Coyrol, raised Bignan in Paris. Bigna published his first translations of Homer in 1819 and won numerous prizes in France in the following years. He is buried in the Père Lachaise Cemetery in Paris.

== Selected works ==
- L'Épître à un jeune romantique sur la gloire littéraire de la France [Epistle to a young romantic on the literary glory of France] - recipient of the Académie française poetry prize in 1831.
