= Saraqusta Film Festival =

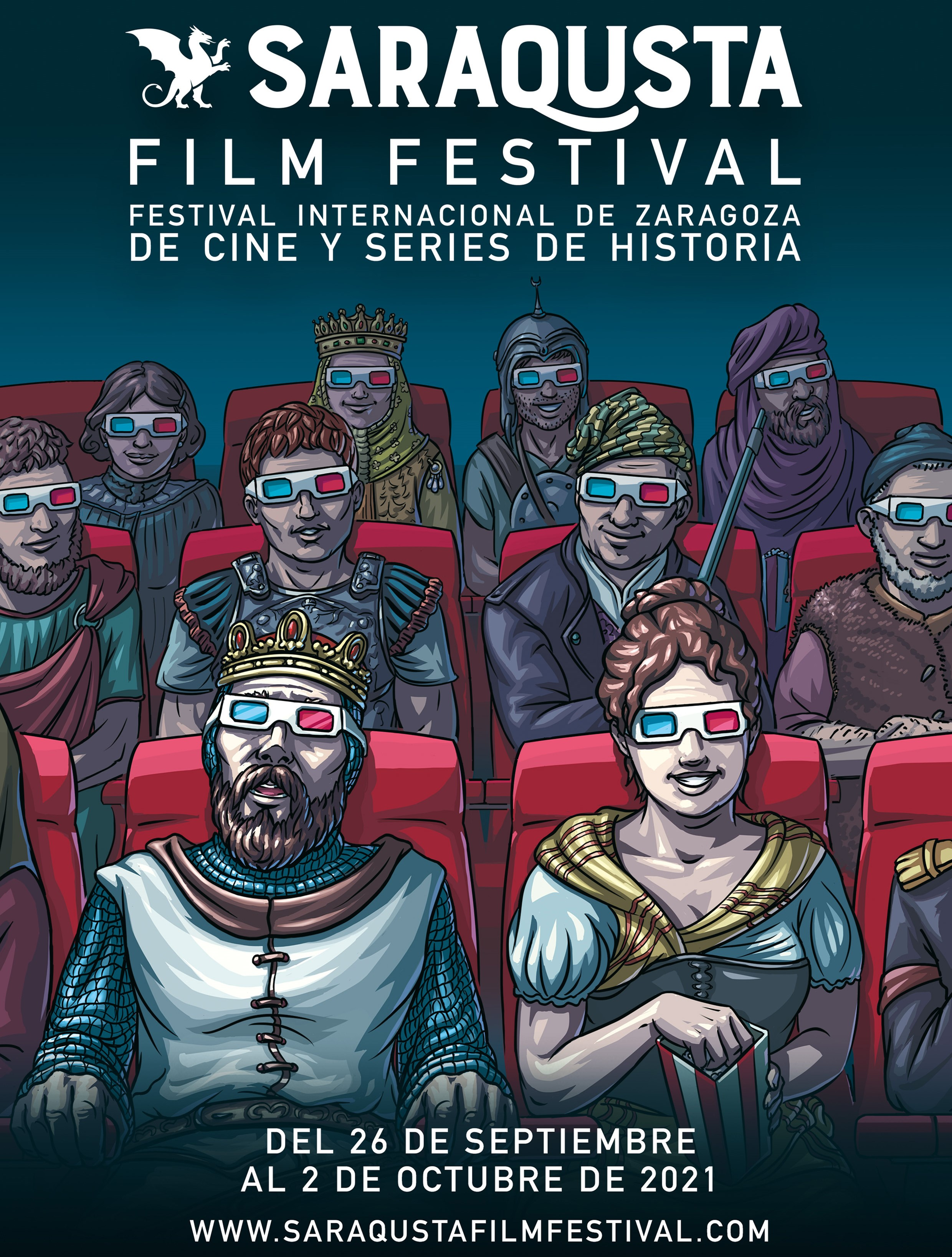
- I SFF poster by Marta Martínez
- Location: Zaragoza
- Founded: 2021
- Most recent: 2024
- Awards: Golden Dragon; Silver Dragon.
- Hosted by: City Council of Zaragoza
- Artistic director: José Ángel Delgado
- Website: saraqustafilmfestival.com

The Saraqusta Film Festival (SFF) is an annual film and television festival which has been organised by the City Council of Zaragoza since 2021 and that specialises in historical films. It is named after the denomination of the city of Zaragoza during the Arab rule. It is also known in a more descriptive way as the International Festival of Historical Films and Series of Zaragoza (Spanish:Festival Internacional de Zaragoza de Cine y Series de Historia). Its competitive section hands awards known as the ‘Golden Dragon’ (Dragón de Oro) and the ‘Silver Dragon’ (Dragón de Plata).

== History ==
The Festival was created in 2021 as a result of an idea by filmmaker José Ángel Delgado, who was its director, to create a film festival specialised in historical films. The proposal was accepted by the City Council of Zaragoza, who had the support of the Provincial Council of Zaragoza and the Government of Aragon. The first edition, held in 2021, was negatively affected by the COVID-19 pandemic. Despite that obstacle, the festival was held again the following year and it held its sixth edition in 2026, slowly gaining a foothold in the tight schedule of Spanish film festivals.

== Structure ==
=== Official section ===
The official section includes the films that compete for the different awards. The films are divided into two types: fiction feature films and documentaries. The first ones must be at least 60 minutes long. Documentaries must be at least 45 minutes long. In both cases, they must have been made over a year and a half before the beginning of the festival and either take place during a past era or deal with a historical subject.

Two main awards called the ‘Golden Dragon’ (Spanish: Dragón de Oro) are given — one to the best fiction feature film and another one to the best documentary. In the fourth edition, they included an economic endowment of €6,000. Moreover, other minor awards known as the ‘Silver Dragon’ (Dragón de Plata) are given to the best actor, actress, director and script. The jury that grants the trophies is multidisciplinary and consists of film industry professionals, critics and historians. Finally, a ‘Youth Award’ is granted by a jury formed by young people. The minor awards were endowed with €1,000 in the fourth edition.

=== Other sections ===
During the first editions, a non-competitive section dedicated to showing television series was organised. However, experience showed that the SFF could not compete against festivals explicitly focused on series, so the section was rearranged in the third edition as ‘Saraqusta Outlook’ (Spanish: Panorama Saraqusta), a non-competitive exhibition parallel to the official section.

An Aragonese Documentary section was added in the fourth edition, whose screening took place in the morning in the Caesaragusta Theatre Museum (Spanish: Museo del Teatro de Caesaraugusta). Its aim is to promote the work of regional professionals and it is not competitive either. Admission to the screenings is free until full capacity.

Lastly, special screenings outside the competition are done as part of the inauguration, the closing ceremony or as a homage to certain people receiving honorary awards. These screenings do not have to be of recently released films.

== Other activities ==
Besides the screenings of the different sections, they organise panel discussions of different topics related to audiovisual production, and there are daily press conferences to inform about the development of the festival. They also give what is known as the ‘Saraqusta Award’ (Spanish: Premio Saraqusta), an honorary award for audiovisual professionals whose trajectory has been related to historical themed films. Some of the honorees have been actors Rodolfo Sancho, Joaquim de Almeida and Fabio Testi, producer Andrés Vicente Gómez, and directors Agustí Villaronga and Antonio del Real.

== Evolution ==
In the course of its brief history, the Festival has slowly grown and become established. Whereas for the second edition they received 450 entries from 68 different countries —and more than 600 from 82 countries in the third one—, in the fourth edition the number of films that submitted an application to be included was 734. It was also in that same edition that 3,800 people attended the different screenings. The initial aim of the organisers is to turn the SFF into the most important film festival in Zaragoza and for it to gain a foothold in the tight schedule of film festivals held in Spain.

== Golden Dragons ==
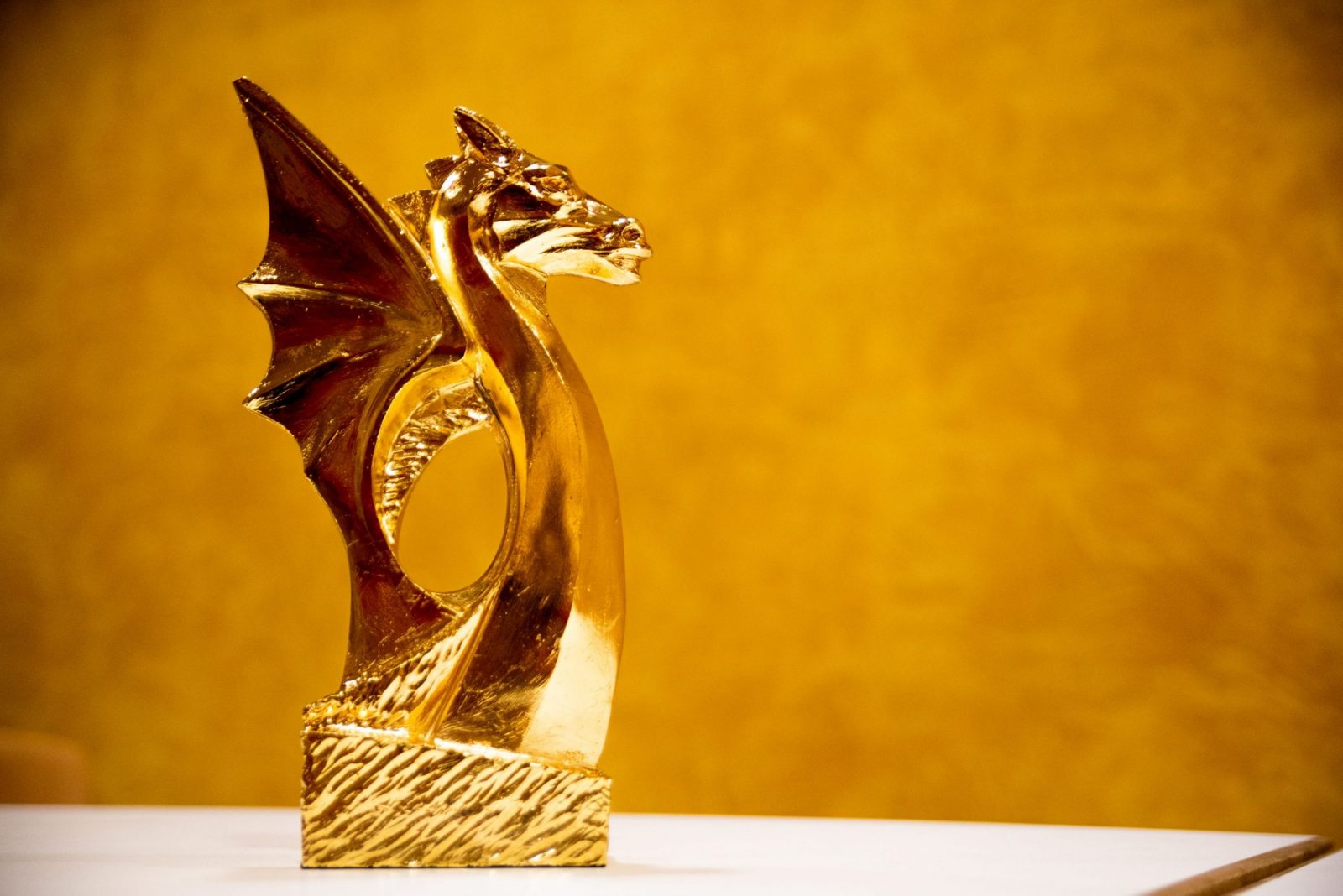
The Golden Dragon is the most important award. (Photo: Josian Pastor)

Year	Category	Film	Country	Ref.
2021	Fiction	Delicious	France	
2021	Documentary	The Spanish Flu	France	
2022	Fiction	The Electrical Life of Louis Wain	United Kingdom	
2022	Documentary	The Kaiser of Atlantis	Argentina Spain	
2023	Fiction	Il Boemo	Czech Republic	
2023	Documentary	Urraca, cazador de rojos	Spain	
2024	Fiction	Brothers	Czech Republic	
2024	Documentary	Marisol, llámame Pepa	Spain	
2025	Fiction	12.12: The Day	South Korea	
2025	Documentary	Portugal '74	France	
2026	Fiction	The Money Maker	France	
2026	Documentary	Fiume o morte!	Croatia	

== Bibliography ==
- "El Saraqusta Film Festival de Zaragoza, dedicado al cine histórico, inicia su camino" [The Saraqusta Film Festival of Zaragoza, dedicated to historical cinema, begins its journey]. Heraldo de Aragón (in Spanish). Zaragoza. September 16, 2021.
- "El primer Saraqusta Film Festival llena Zaragoza de cine y series históricas" [The first Saraqusta Film Festival fills Zaragoza with historical films and series]. Cinemanía (in Spanish). Madrid. September 22, 2021.
- "Palmarés del I Saraqusta Film Festival" [Winners of the I Saraqusta Film Festival]. Cinemanía (in Spanish). Madrid. October 2, 2021.
- "El Saraqusta Film Festival regresa en tiempo récord con una nueva edición" [The Saraqusta Film Festival returns in record time with a new edition]. Heraldo de Aragón (in Spanish). Zaragoza. April 1, 2022.
- D.M.B. (April 24, 2022). "El Saraqusta Film Festival inaugura su segunda edición" [The Saraqusta Film Festival inaugurates its second edition]. El Periódico de Aragón (in Spanish). Zaragoza.
- Laguna, Raquel (May 4, 2022). "Mr. Wain y El Káiser de la Atlántida triunfan en el II Saraqusta Film Festival de Zaragoza" [Mr. Wain and The Kaiser of Atlantis triumph at the II Saraqusta Film Festival in Zaragoza]. Cinemanía (in Spanish). Madrid.
- Ferrer, Pablo (March 21, 2023). "El III Saraqusta Film Festival se entrega al wéstern, el cine bélico y las vidas de artistas" [The III Saraqusta Film Festival is dedicated to westerns, war films and the lives of artists]. Heraldo de Aragón (in Spanish). Zaragoza.
- Laguna, Raquel (May 8, 2023). "Las joyas que nos ha dejado el III Saraqusta Film Festival de Zaragoza" [The gems left to us by the III Saraqusta Film Festival in Zaragoza]. Cinemanía (in Spanish). Madrid.
- H.A. (May 3, 2024). "Marisol, llámame Pepa y La leyenda del escanyapobres triunfan en el Saraqusta Film Festival" [‘Marisol, llámame Pepa’ and ‘La leyenda del escanyapobres’ triumph at the Saraqusta Film Festival]. Heraldo de Aragón (in Spanish). Zaragoza.
