= Assassin(s) =

1997 film

- Film poster
- Directed by: Mathieu Kassovitz
- Written by: Mathieu Kassovitz; Nicolas Boukhrief
- Produced by: Christophe Rossignon
- Starring: Michel Serrault; Mathieu Kassovitz
- Cinematography: Pierre Aïm
- Edited by: Mathieu Kassovitz; Yannick Kergoat
- Music by: Carter Burwell
- Distributed by: MKL Distribution
- Release date: 30 April 1997
- Running time: 128 minutes
- Country: France
- Language: French
- Budget: $7.5 million
- Box office: $3.3 million

Assassin(s) is a 1997 French drama film directed, co-written, and co-edited by Mathieu Kassovitz, who also stars as Max. It was entered into the 1997 Cannes Film Festival.

== Cast ==
- Michel Serrault as Mr. Wagner
- Mathieu Kassovitz as Max
- Hélène de Fougerolles as Hélène
- Danièle Lebrun as Max's Mother
- Léa Drucker as Léa
- Mehdi Benoufa as Mehdi
- Robert Gendreu as Mr. Vidal
- François Levantal as Inspector
