= Delicious (2021 film) =

2021 French/Belgian film

- Theatrical release poster
- Directed by: Éric Besnard
- Written by: Éric Besnard; Nicolas Boukhrief
- Produced by: Philip Boëffard; Christophe Rossignon
- Starring: Grégory Gadebois; Isabelle Carré; Benjamin Lavernhe; Guillaume de Tonquédec
- Cinematography: Jean-Marie Dreujou
- Edited by: Lydia Decobert
- Music by: Christophe Julien
- Release date: 8 September 2021
- Running time: 112 min
- Countries: France; Belgium
- Language: French
- Budget: $5.4 million
- Box office: $8.4 million

Delicious (French: Délicieux) is a 2021 French/Belgian comedy-drama film directed by Éric Besnard. The film was nominated for two categories at the 47th César Awards, Best Costume Design and Best Production Design.

== Plot ==
Set in 1789 before the French Revolution, the film begins with the main character Pierre Manceron (played by Grégory Gadebois) making a beautifully crafted dish, a tiny savory pastry filled with mushroom and potato. Manceron is the master cook of a French aristocrat, the Duke of Chamfort. Today is Manceron's chance to prove himself to the duke. If he serves a meal that pleases all of the duke's Parisian friends, he will be deemed ready to go to Paris and cook for the finest of French palates. Among a multitude of classic preordered dishes served, he serves one small creation of his own (the small pastry from the opening scene which he names 'the delicious'). The duke's friends at first praise his cooking but one of them notices the pastry has potatoes, which at the time is a foreign food to them. They consider it an insult to be served food grown below ground, and German no less. He is then humiliated by the nobles and fired by his duke for not apologizing. He is forced to retreat to his father's house, which has now been looted by starving citizens looking for food. His son Benjamin (Lorenzo Lefèbvre) and old friend Jacob (Christian Bouillette) join him.

A woman named Louise (Isabelle Carré) arrives at their doorstep asking to become Manceron's apprentice. Manceron claims he is done with cooking and rejects her. Even when she offers to pay him, he says cooking is a man's profession. She refuses to leave or take the shelter he offers. She sits in the rain all night refusing to come inside until he changes his mind.

Manceron grudgingly takes her on and finds that she is a talented cook. Manceron and Louise grow closer as they form a bond through their cooking. Soon he has an opportunity to win back his position with the Duke of Chamfort. They all work diligently to prepare, in spite of his son, Benjamin's insistence that they are better off running an inn and cooking for passing travelers. Benjamin is a bit of a bookworm and a revolutionary. He is proved right when the duke and his friends laugh and drive their carriage past the feast prepared for them, without even stopping. The duke has humiliated Manceron again. When Benjamin tries to eat one of 'the delicious' pastries, Louise throws them all on the ground. The chickens eat the pastries and immediately drop dead, revealing Louise's plot to poison the duke. She admits that she is actually an aristocrat's widow. In the past, the duke attempted to seduce her, in spite of her already being married. When she rejected his advances, he threatened to ruin her and her husband. He not only strips them of land and title, he also has her husband hanged outside her bedroom window. With no money and no home to return to, Louise has nothing to lose. She decided to work for Manceron so she might get the opportunity to cook for the duke and kill him with poison.

Manceron feels devastated by the Duke's rejection and by Louise's betrayal. He gets very drunk, falls off his horse, and gravely injures himself. Louise nurses him back to health. When he wakes up 3 days later, she has turned the inn into a thriving business. He walks outside and sees dozens of soldiers at tables eating and enjoying themselves. Louise has hired the young girls who steal bread from the inn as waitresses. The many soldiers are heard discussing being called to action to defend the king who anticipates an uprising.

Manceron is still angry that Louise lied to him, but they all agree to start a business where anyone can come and eat and pay for large portions of food or small portions. This is revolutionary at a time when delicious cooking is reserved for the aristocratic and the wealthy.

The business is thriving, but Louise cannot let go of her desire for revenge. She fears the duke will return and she will not be able to resist attempting to poison him again. Instead of risking her friend's reputation and life, she leaves in the dead of night. Manceron becomes increasingly depressed without Louise. Without her to help cook and serve, he and Benjamin cannot keep up with the demand of his newly established restaurant. He could find another apprentice or hire some of the thieves again, but without Louise his passion for cooking dwindles and soon people stop coming to eat.

Manceron realizes he doesn't want to continue without her and devises a plot to get her back. First he goes to the duke and convinces him to come to the inn to try his new recipes and give him another chance to redeem himself. Then he goes to the convent where Louise has sought shelter. He begs her to return and tells her he has a plan.

The duke and his lady arrive at the Inn and see many tables being placed outside. He is greeted by Manceron and seated at a small table inside. Unlike the last feast, no finery or decorations have been put up and all of the duke's servants have been dismissed. Manceron says he wants the duke to have the full experience of what he has created here and even serves him on tin plates. As the duke and his lady try the first course ('the delicious' pastry) other guests begin to arrive. The duke gets very angry, saying "This meal was supposed to just be for the two of us." He demands that Manceron kick the other guests out, but more and more arrive. The guests are people of all classes, some in fine clothes and some dressed very poorly. Louise reveals herself and the duke recognizes her. He spits out his food fearing it's poison. She laughs saying, "I could have poisoned you but I don't think I need to." They reveal a flier that reads "Come to the Inn and eat a free meal with the Duke of Chamfort." The duke is both humiliated and afraid. He threatens to have them hanged. He tries to slap Louise but Manceron grabs the Duke's hand and demands he apologize. The people around them also jump to action, shouting "down with the aristocracy!" The Duke is terrified and runs to his carriage, nearly leaving his lady behind in his haste. People continue to arrive at the restaurant. One of the duke's servants watches his master flee. The servant decides he is better off at the inn and takes off his wig and starts to seat the arriving guests at the tables, welcoming them warmly. Manceron and Louise smile at each other and share a kiss. The camera pulls back to reveal the French countryside and a text appears on screen: "two days later, the Bastille fell."

== Cast ==
- Grégory Gadebois as Pierre Manceron
- Isabelle Carré as Louise
- Benjamin Lavernhe as Duc de Chamfort
- Guillaume de Tonquédec as Hyacinthe
- Christian Bouillette as Jacob
- Lorenzo Lefèbvre as Benjamin Manceron
- Marie-Julie Baup as Marquise de Saint-Genet
- Laurent Bateau as Dumortier
- Manon Combes as Francine

== Production ==
Filming locations included Brezons (Cantal), Conques-en-Rouergue (Aveyron) and the Château de Champlâtreux in Épinay-Champlâtreux (Val-d'Oise).

== Release ==
=== Reception ===
On review aggregator Rotten Tomatoes, the film holds an approval rating of 100% based on eighteen critical reviews.

== Awards and nominations ==
Association	Year	Category	Work	Recipient
César Awards	2022	Best Costume Design	Madeline Fontaine	Nominated
César Awards	2022	Best Production Design	Bertrand Seitz	Nominated

Association	Year	Category	Recipient(s)	Award	Result	Ref.
Saraqusta Film Festival	2021	Best fiction film		Golden Dragon	Won	
Saraqusta Film Festival	2021	Best script	Eric Besnard; Nicolas Boukhrief	Silver Dragon	Won	
