= Roman Theater (Zaragoza) =

Ancient Roman theater in Zaragoza, Spain

Roman Theater of Zaragoza
- Teatro romano de Zaragoza (Spanish)
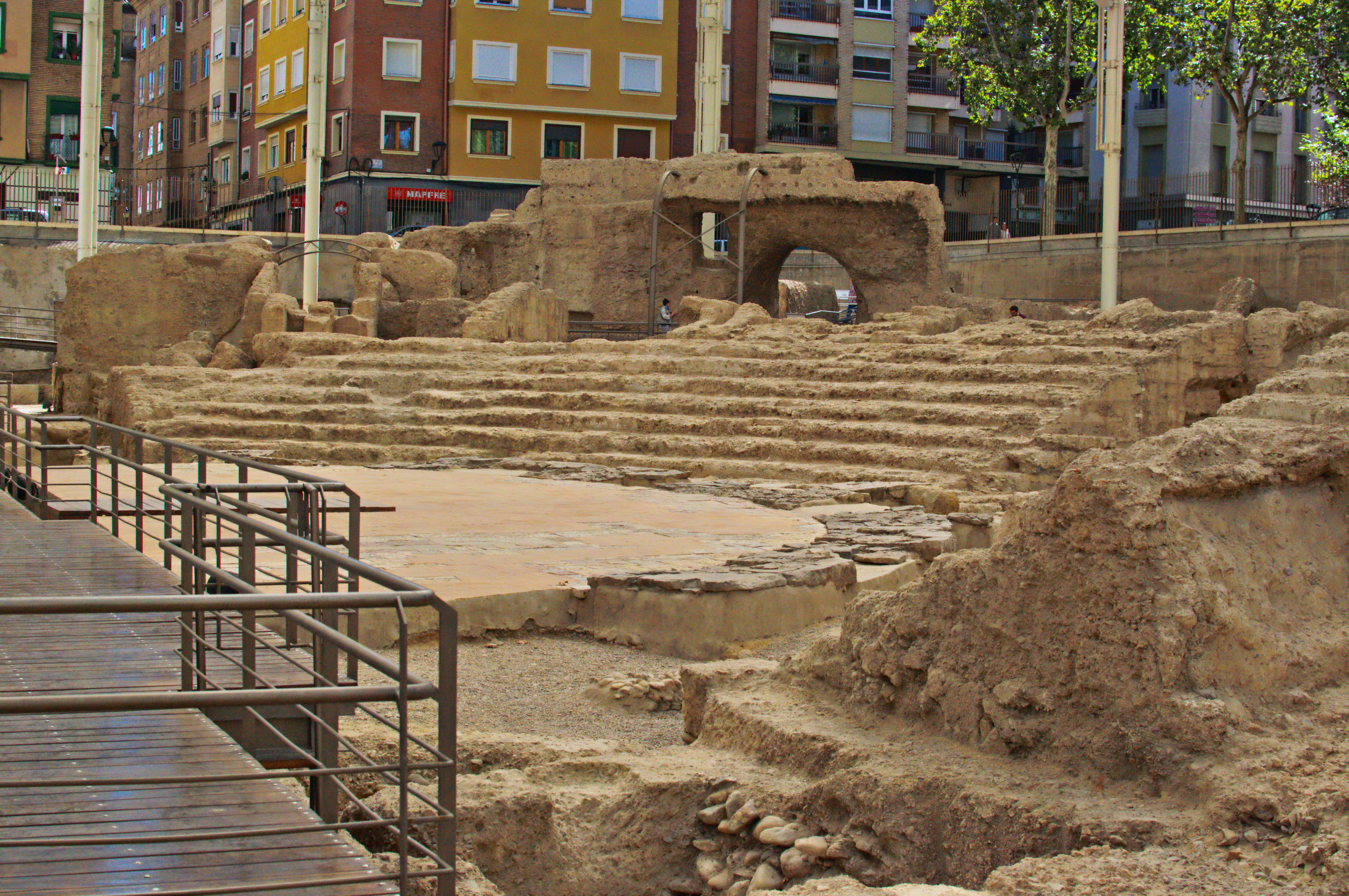

- Location in Spain
- 41.6522°N 0.8778°W
- Type: Roman theatre
- Location: Zaragoza, Spain

Spanish Cultural Heritage
- Official name: Teatro romano
- Type: Non-movable
- Criteria: Monument
- Reference no.: RI-51-0010689

The Roman Theater of Zaragoza is a Roman theatre in the Roman colonia of Caesaraugusta –present-day Zaragoza, Spain–, in the Roman province of Hispania Tarraconensis. It was built in the first half of the 1st century AD, in the Age of Tiberius and Claudius, following the model of the Theatre of Marcellus in Rome. It was used for Roman theatrical performances and had a capacity of 6,000 spectators in a city where only lived 18.000 people. Currently in ruins, it was active until the third century.

Its materials were used to build walls and other buildings. In 1973, archeological excavations uncovered it. It can currently be visited within the framework of the Cesaraugusta Theater Museum. It was declared Bien de Interés Cultural in 2001.

== History ==
The construction of the Roman theater of Caesaraugusta began in the early 1st century during the reign of the Roman Emperor Tiberius. It was completed under the rule of Emperor Claudius by the mid-1st century AD. Covering an area of 7,000 square meters (with a diameter of 106 meters), it ranks as one of the largest theaters in Roman Hispania. The theater could accommodate approximately 6,000 spectators in a city with a population of around 20,000 inhabitants.

== Technical features ==
Unlike other theaters that utilized the natural slopes of the land, this building was constructed on flat ground using 'opus caementicium'. It was modeled after the Theatre of Marcellus in Rome, featuring a design of concentric rings with radial walls between them. These walls formed the cavea, or seating tiers, which were then covered with marble slabs, as was the orchestra.

The facade was adorned with ashlar blocks in the 'opus quadratum' style, rising to an external height of three stories and twenty-two meters. The theater boasted a unique, independent entrance from the central door of the facade directly to the orchestra. This path ran perpendicular to the stage or scena and served as a central axis for the theater, exclusively for authorities to directly access their reserved seats in the orchestral semicircle. This special entrance can also be seen in theaters in Turin and Minturno. However, it stands out as unique among the theaters of Roman Hispania. This design choice might be attributed to the variety of performances, not just dramatic, that took place within.

== Transformation and rediscovery ==
The theater's decline began in the 3rd century when stones were repurposed to fortify the city walls and other constructions. As a result, only the Roman concrete structure remains visible today.

Over the years, the theater was buried beneath subsequent constructions. It remained obscured until the 1970s when excavations brought it back into the light. Following its rediscovery, it has been refurbished for public visits and now houses a museum that displays and interprets the archaeological finds uncovered.

Visitors can view the remnants of the seating tiers and stage via walkways. These remnants are protected under a large translucent polycarbonate cover. Adjacent to the archaeological remains, a building has been restored to house the Interpretation Center. This center acquaints visitors with the history of the theater, the dramatic genres, and the social and political life of the era.

== Gallery ==
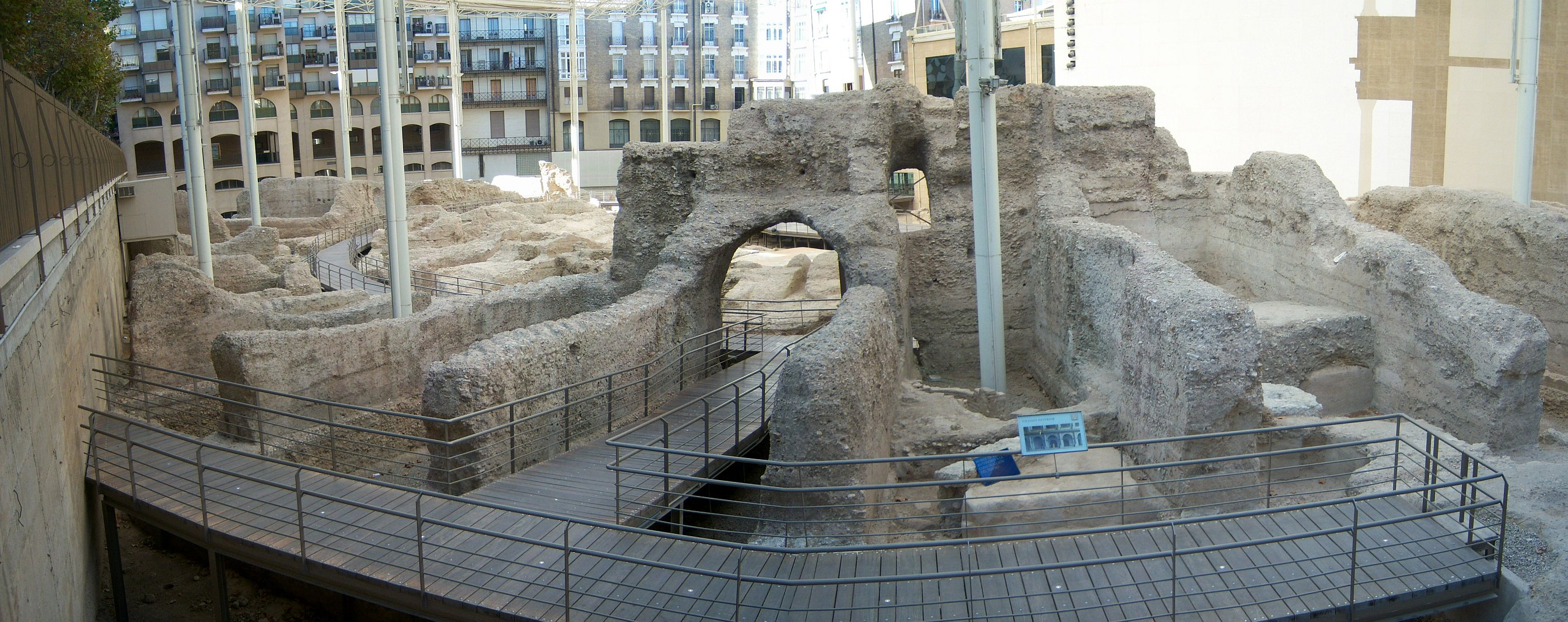
Remains of Caesaraugusta's Ancient Roman theatre, in the modern Zaragossa, in Spain. Constructed with opus caementicium, we can appreciate one of its vomitoria.

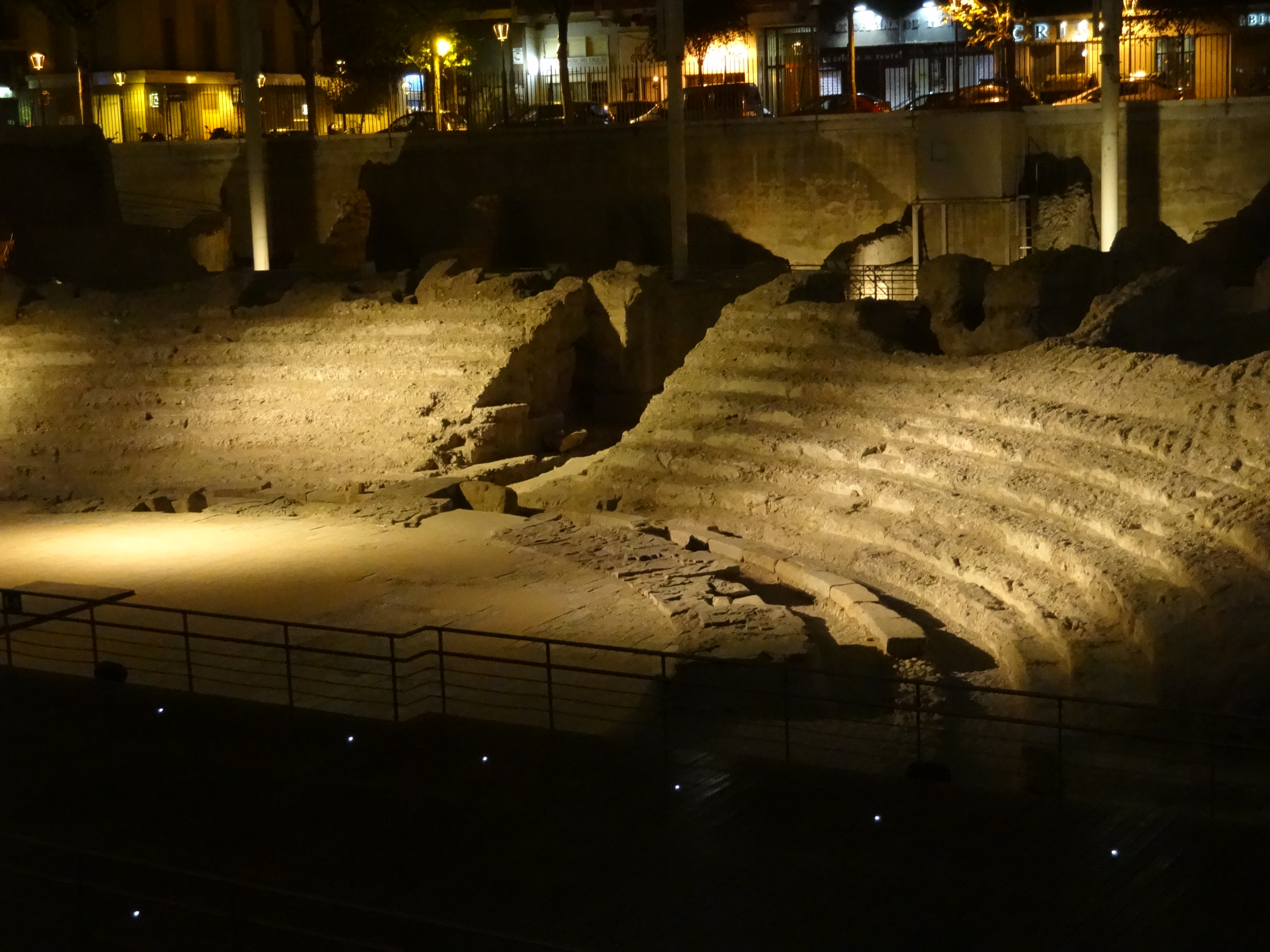
Ancient Roman theatre in Zaragoza, at night

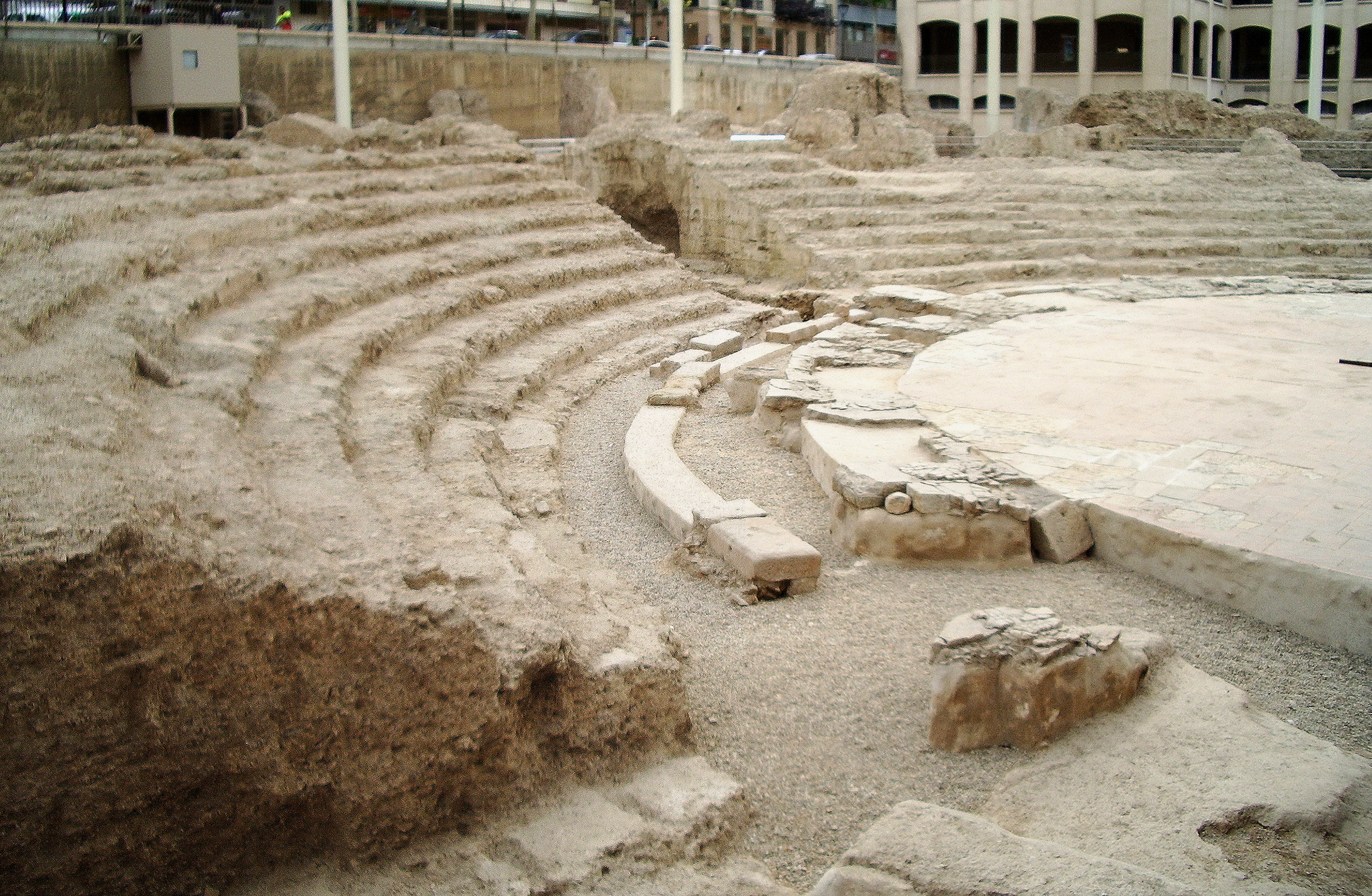
View of the theatre

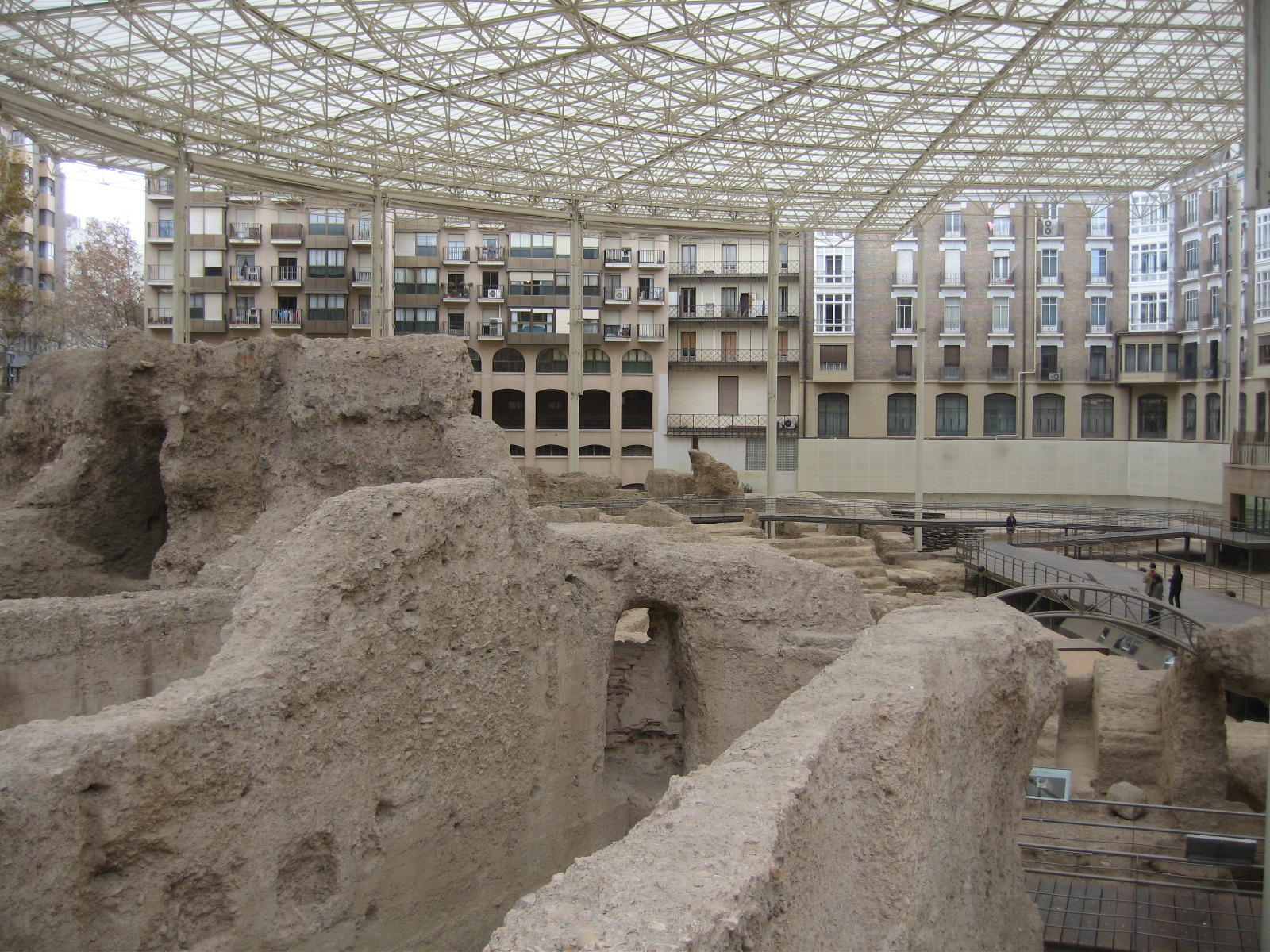
View of the theatre

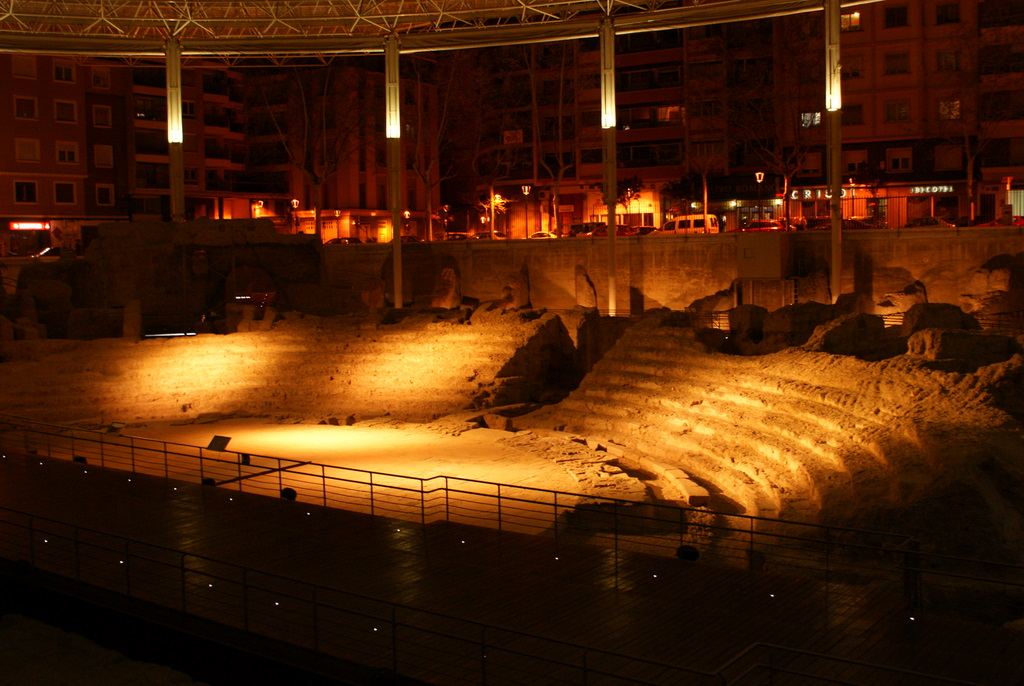
View of the theatre

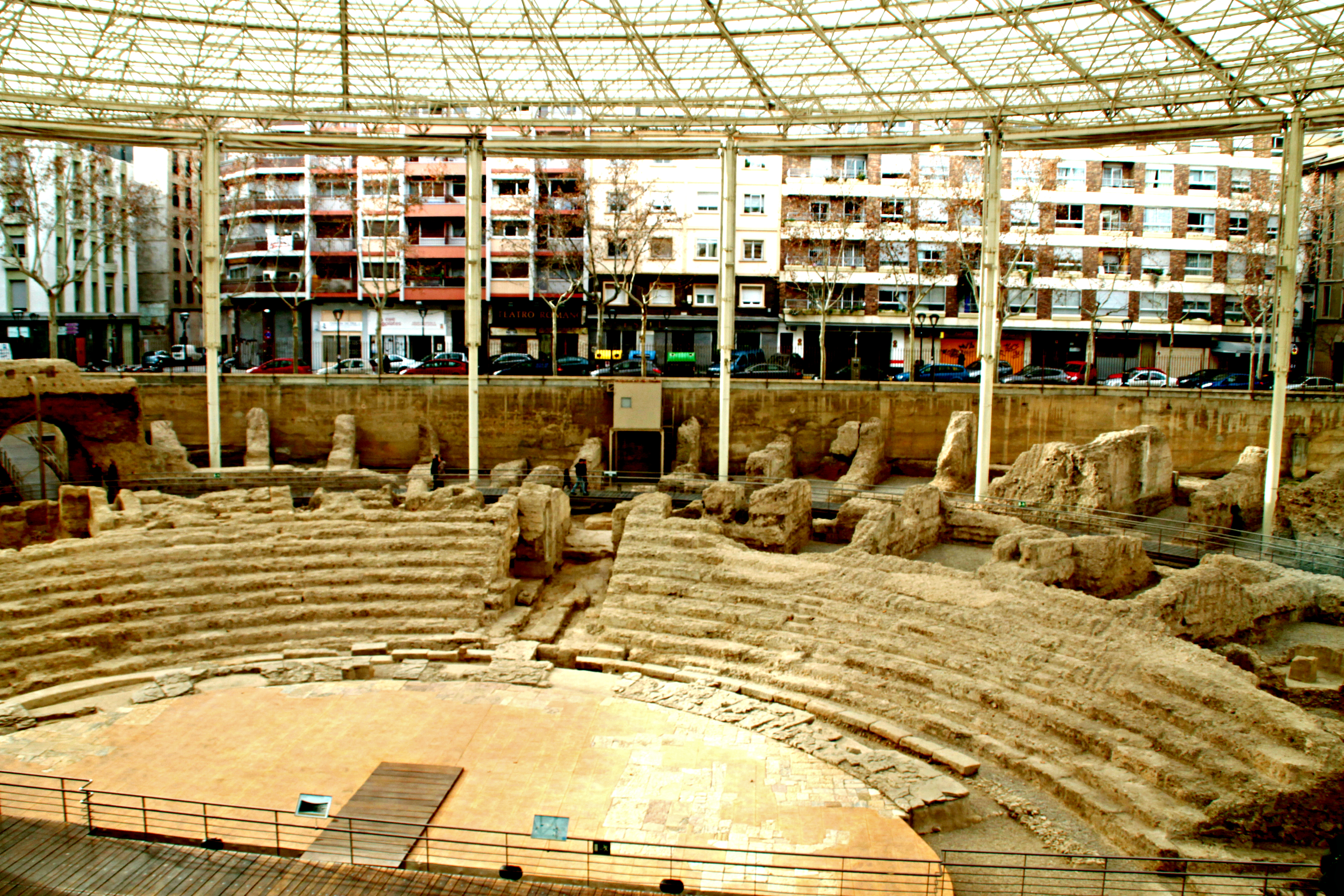
View of the theatre

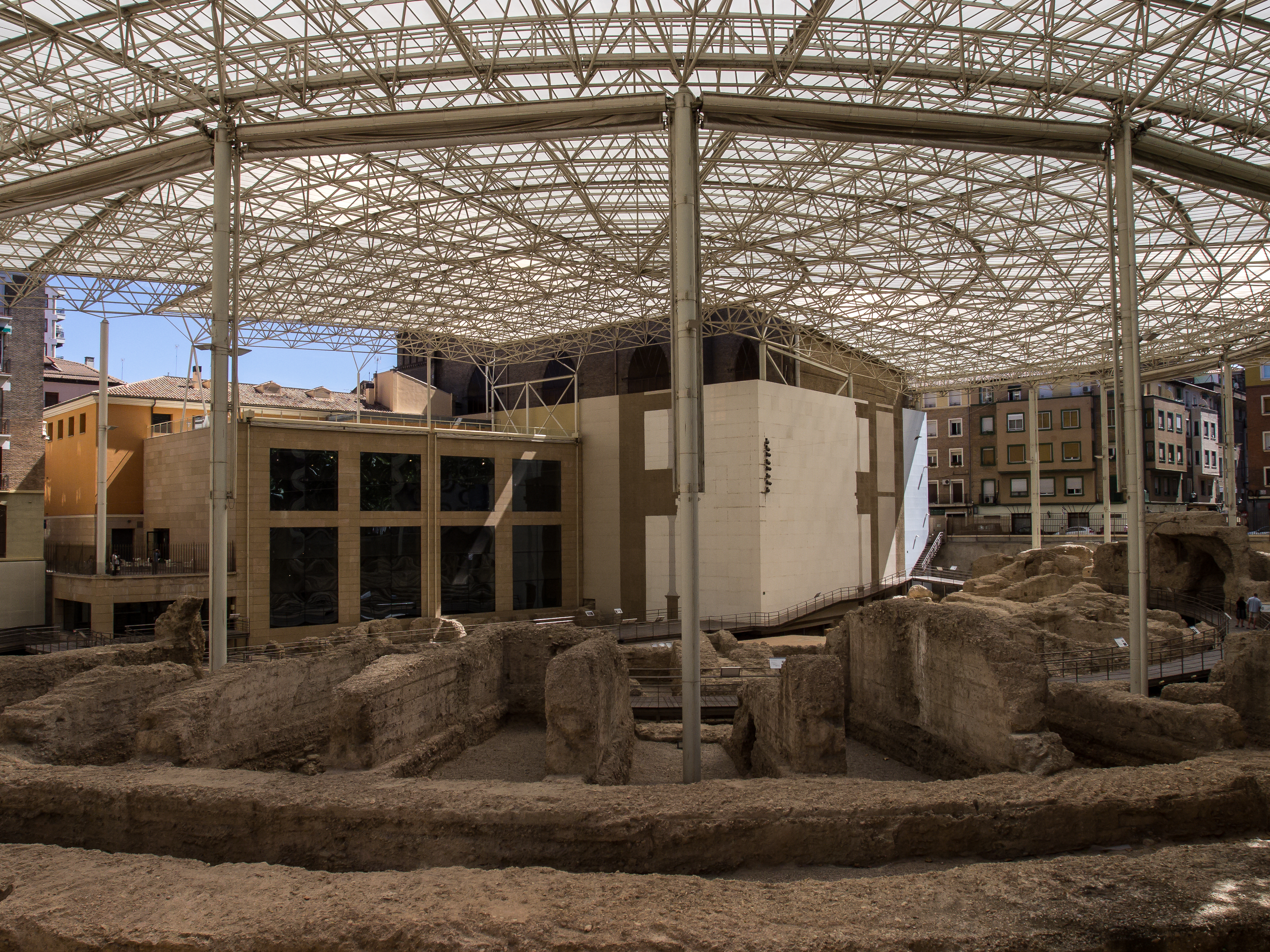
View of the theatre

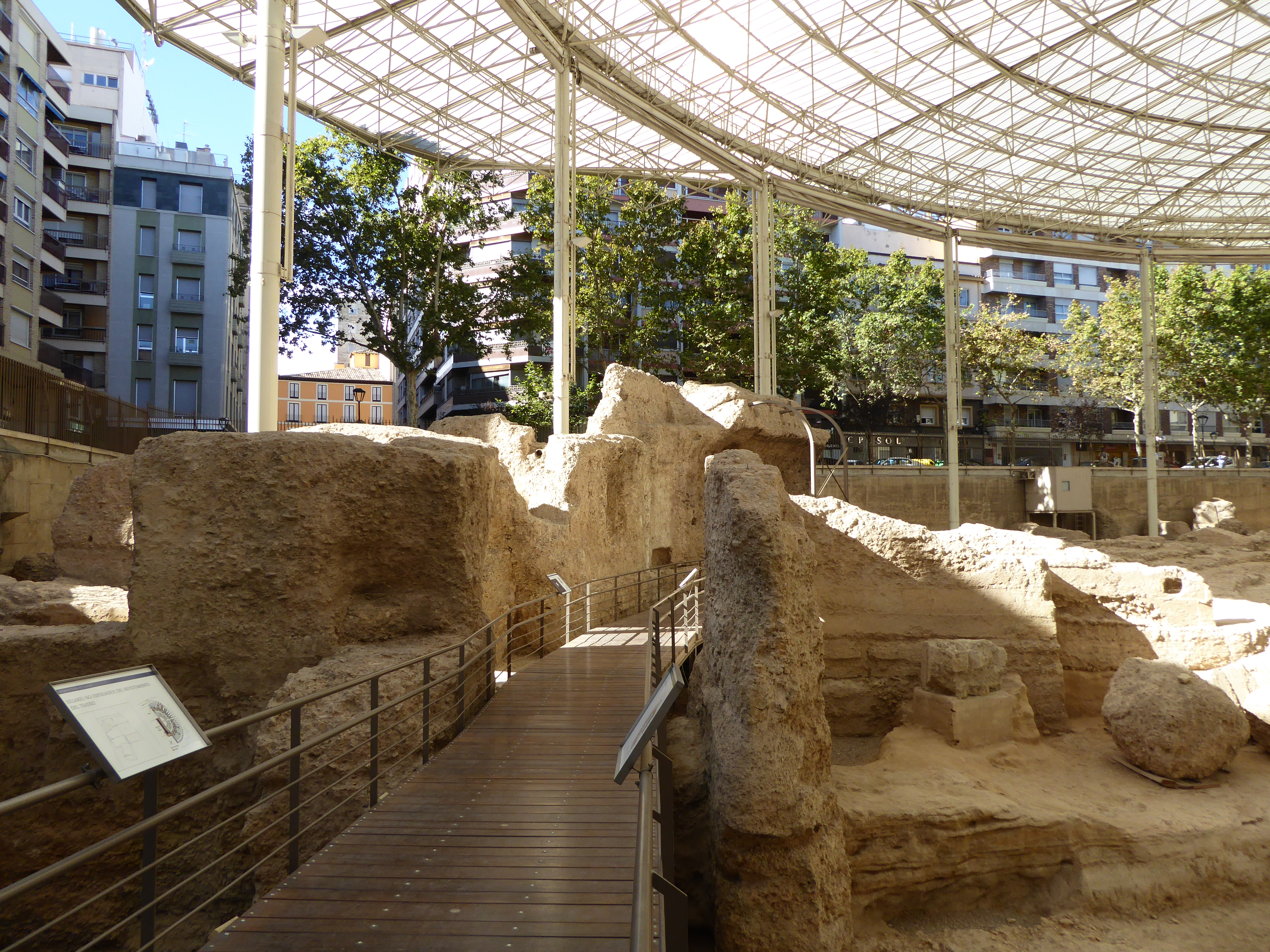
View of the theatre

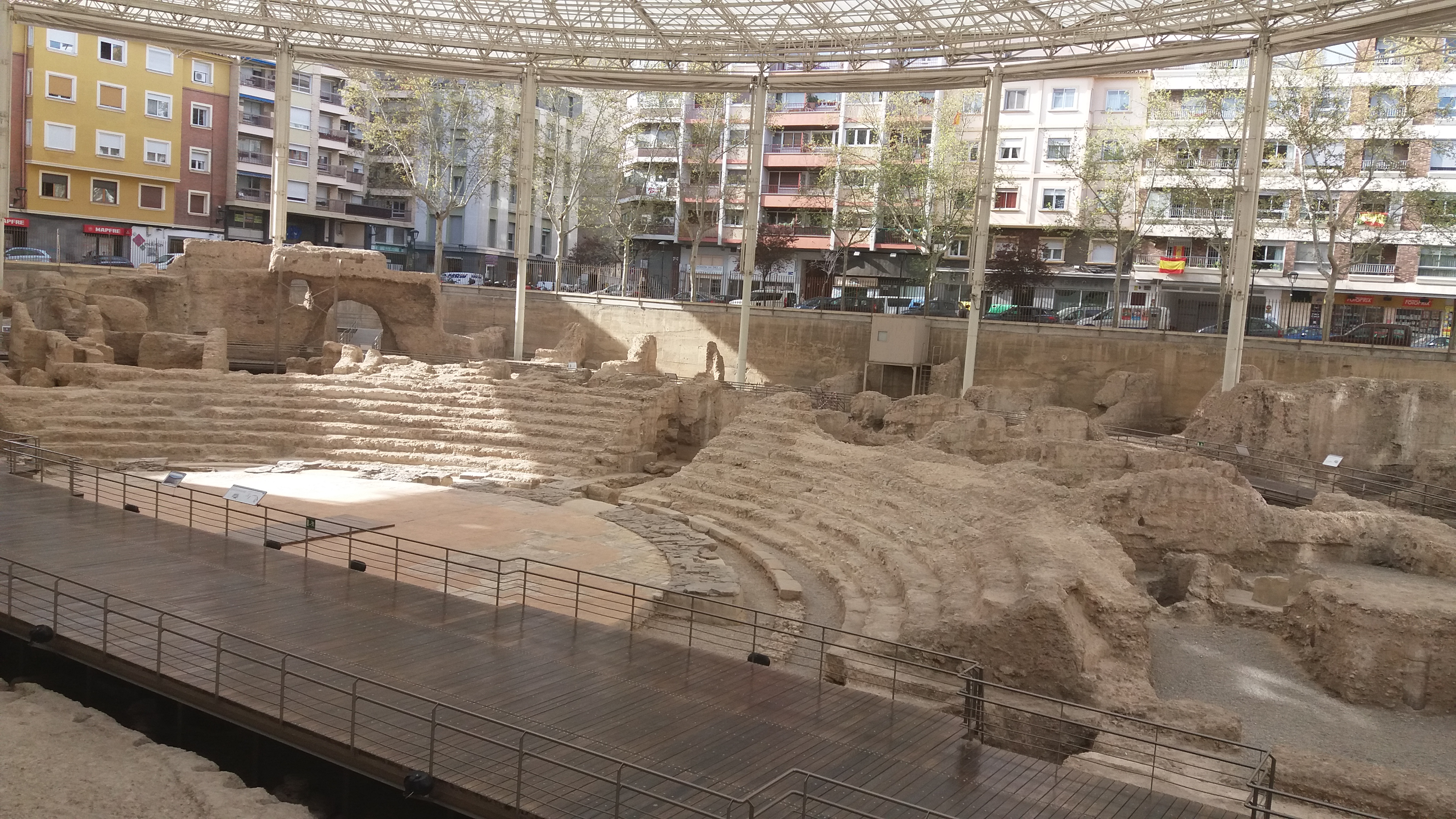
View of the theatre

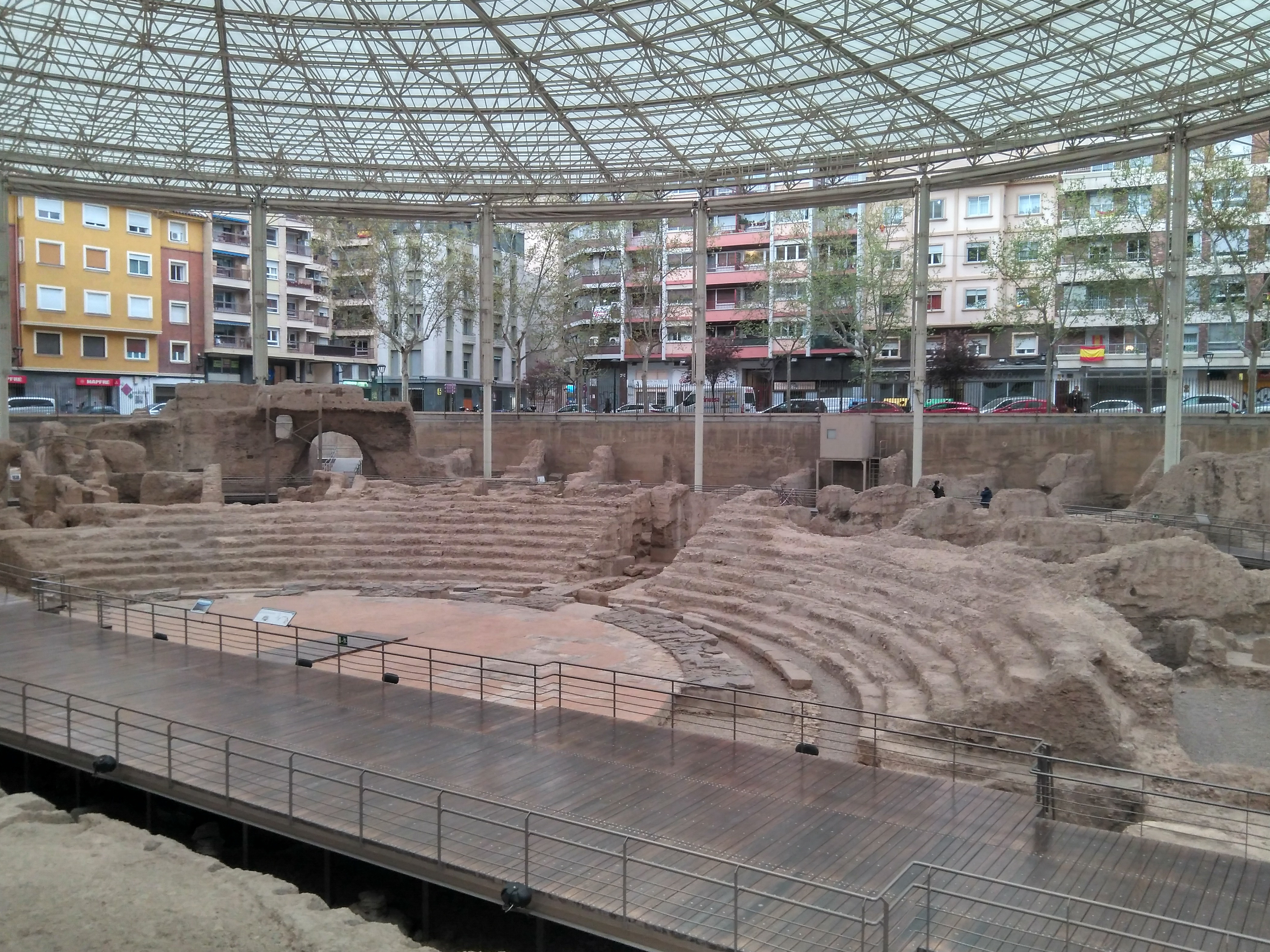
View of the theatre

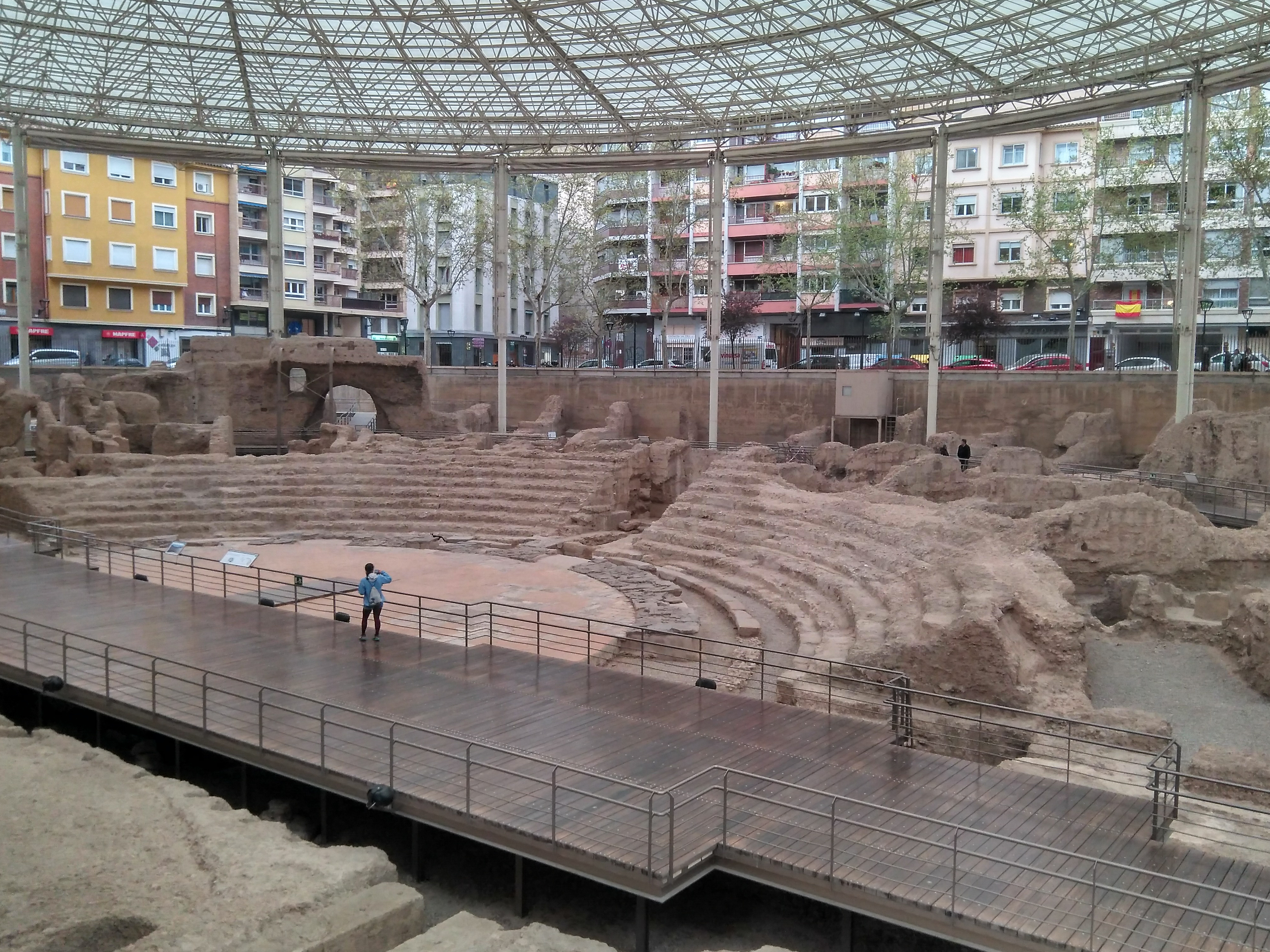
View of the theatre

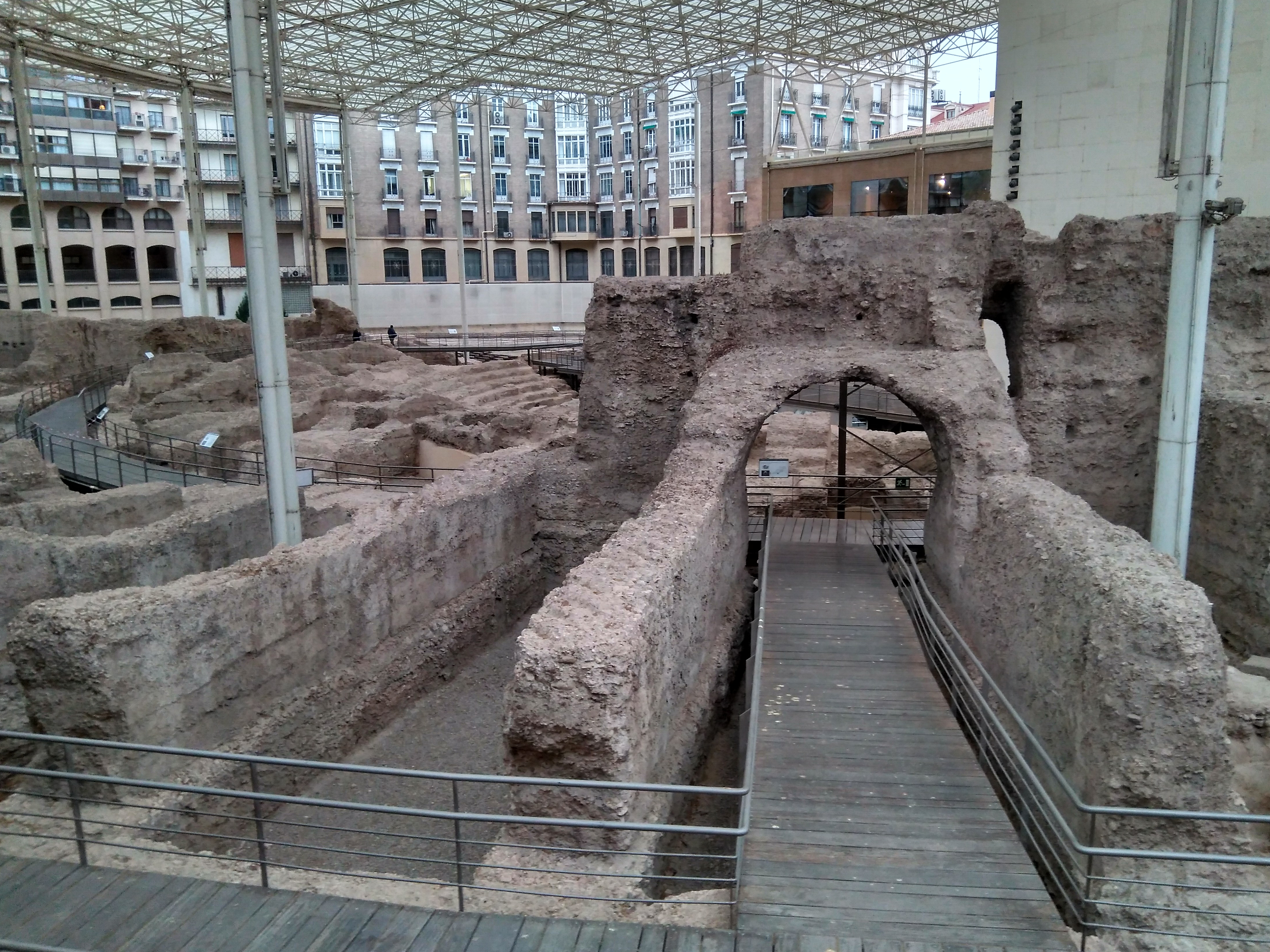
View of the theatre

View of the Roman theatre

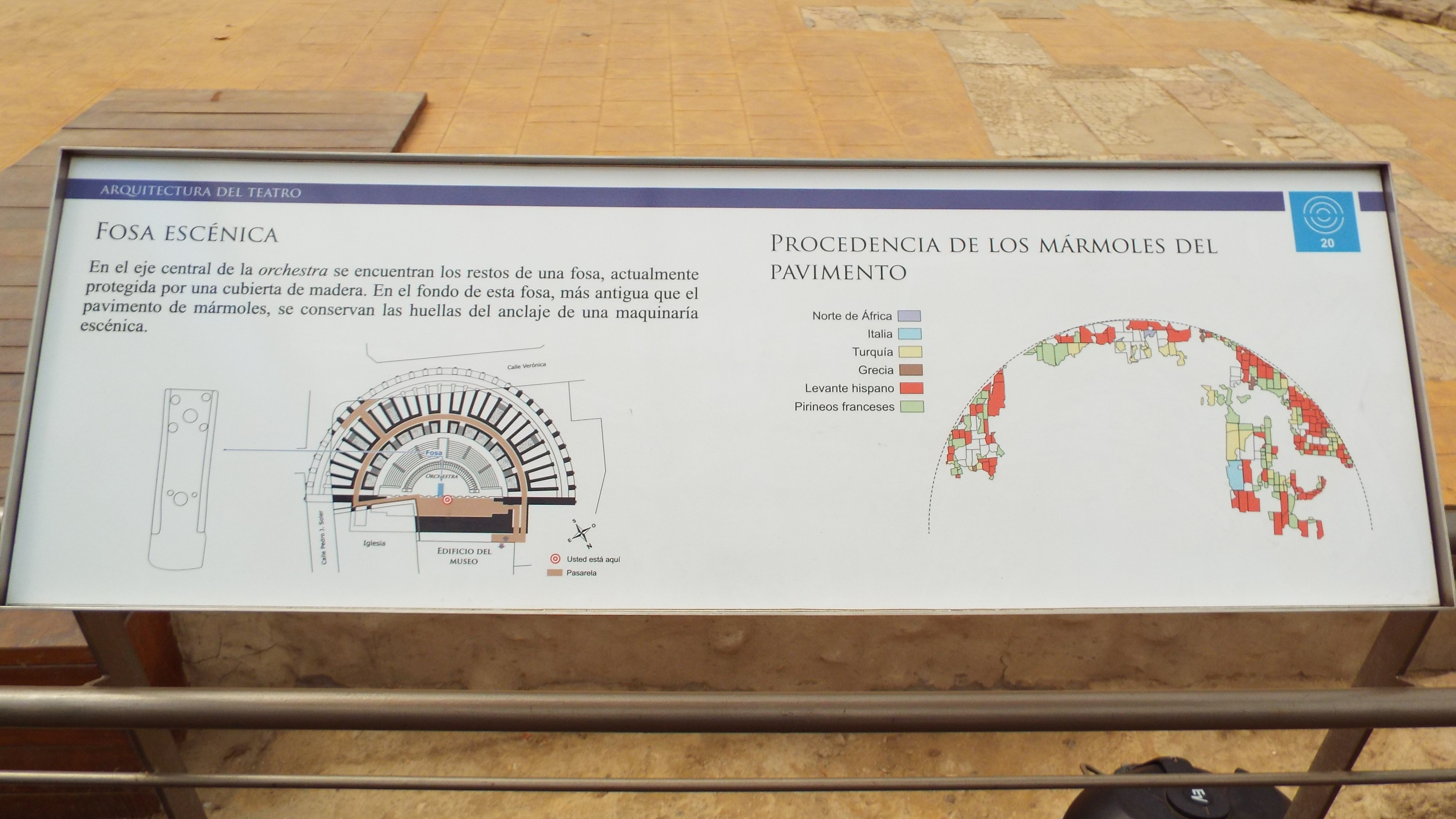
Roman Theatre Museum poster of a scenic pit

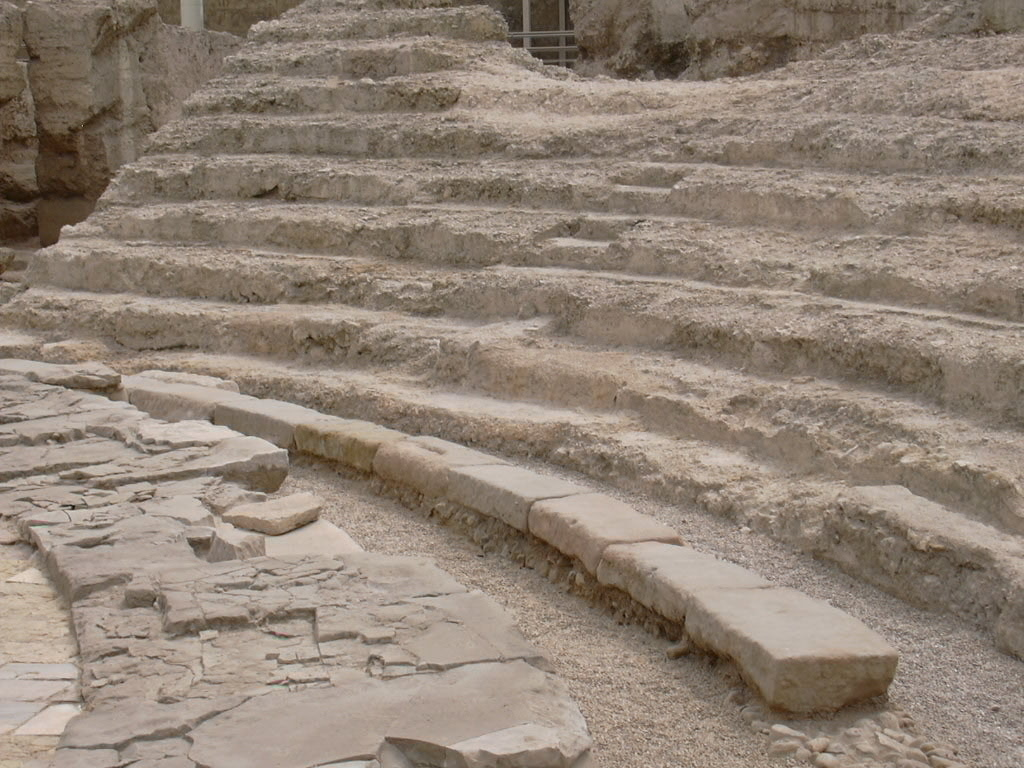
Stands of the Roman theater of Zarazoza

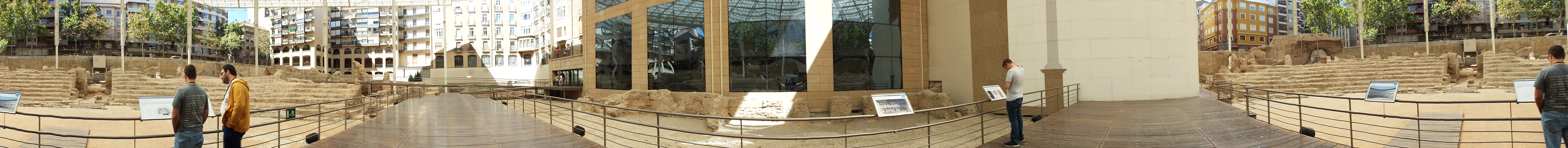
Panoramic view of the remains of the Roman theater of Caesaraugusta in present-day Zaragoza, Spain

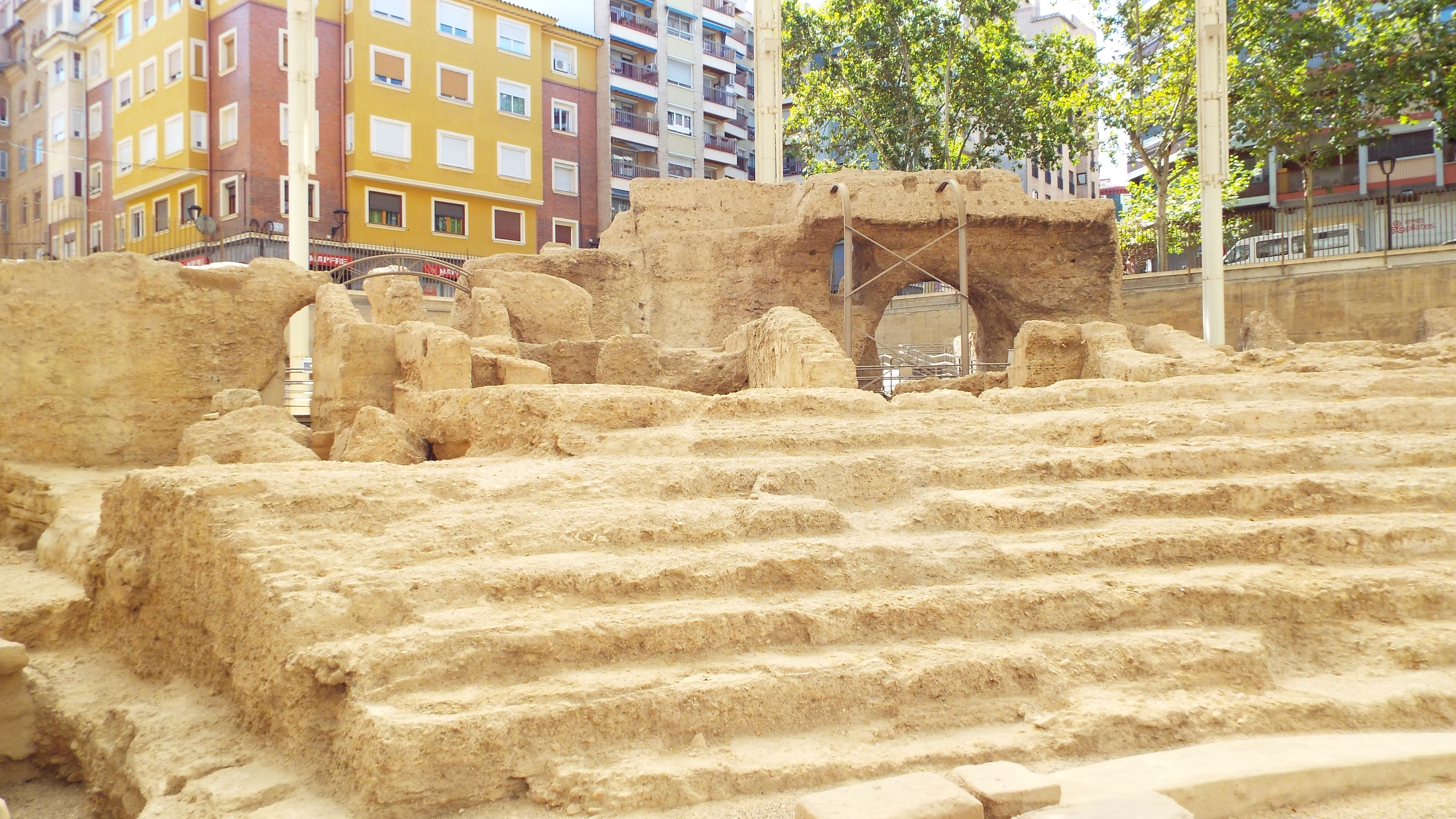
Stands of the Roman Theater Museum in Zaragoza

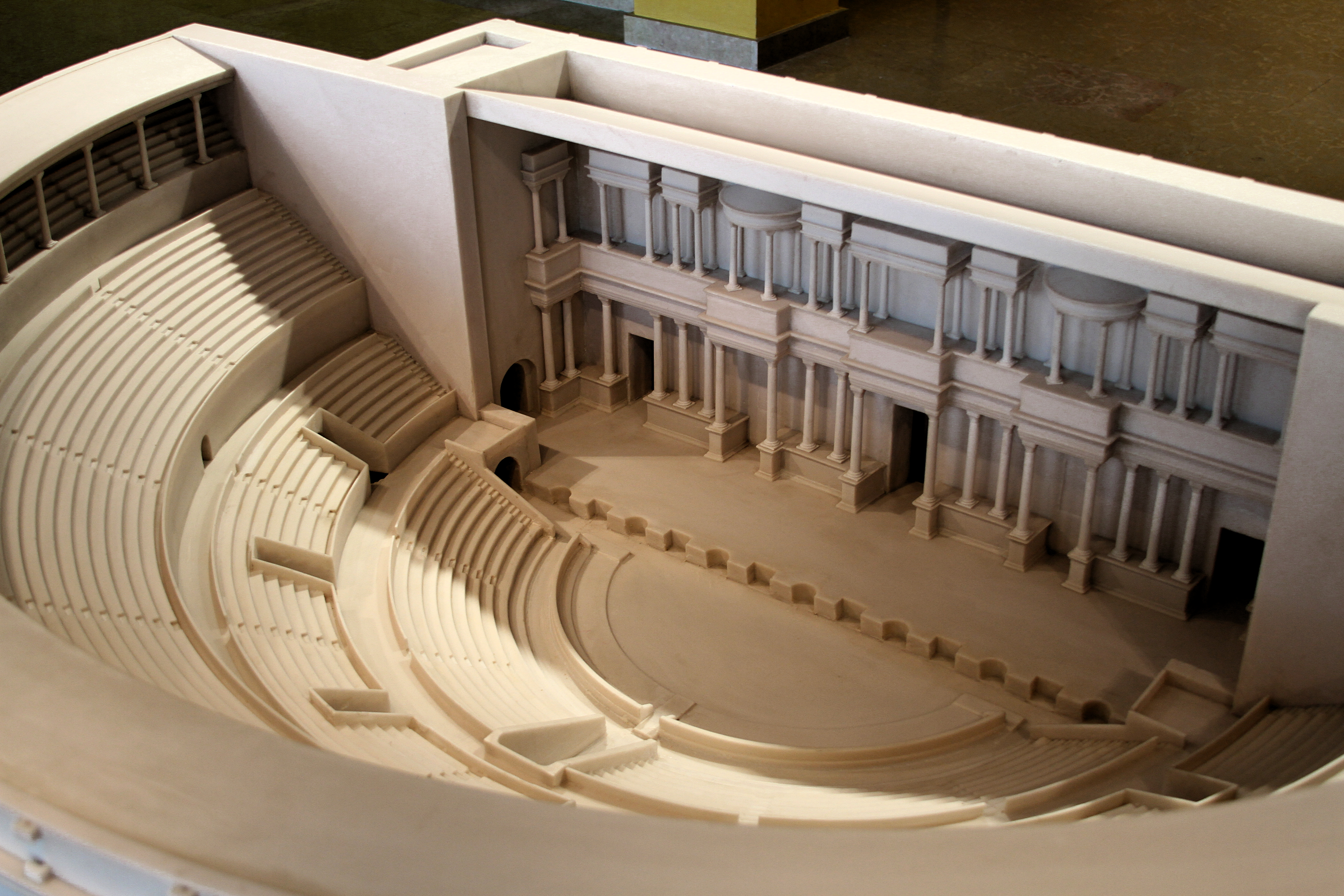
Model of the Roman Theater of Zaragoza (Caesaraugusta)

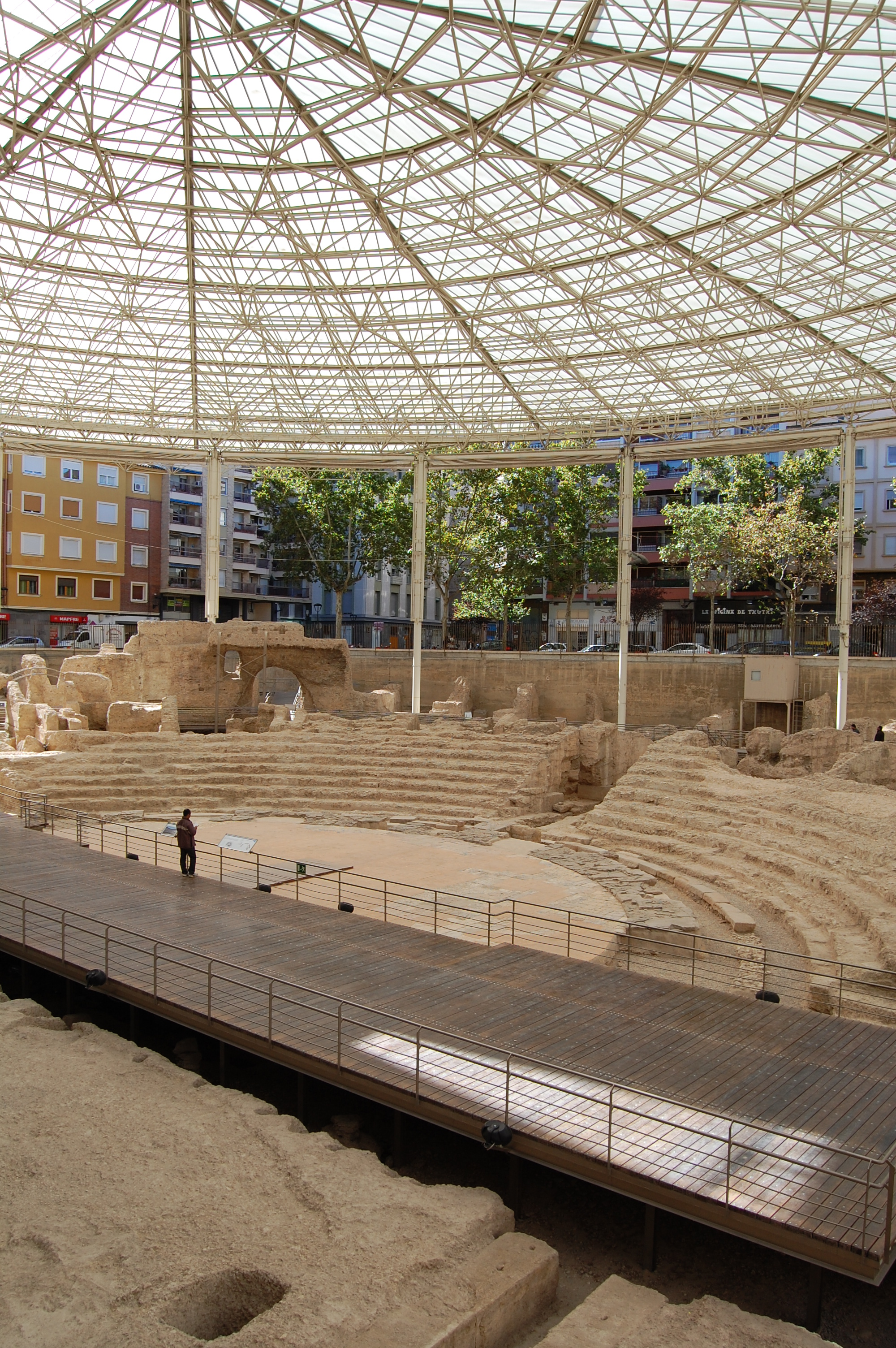
Frame roof structure at the Zaragoza's (Caesaraugusta) Roman Theater Museum

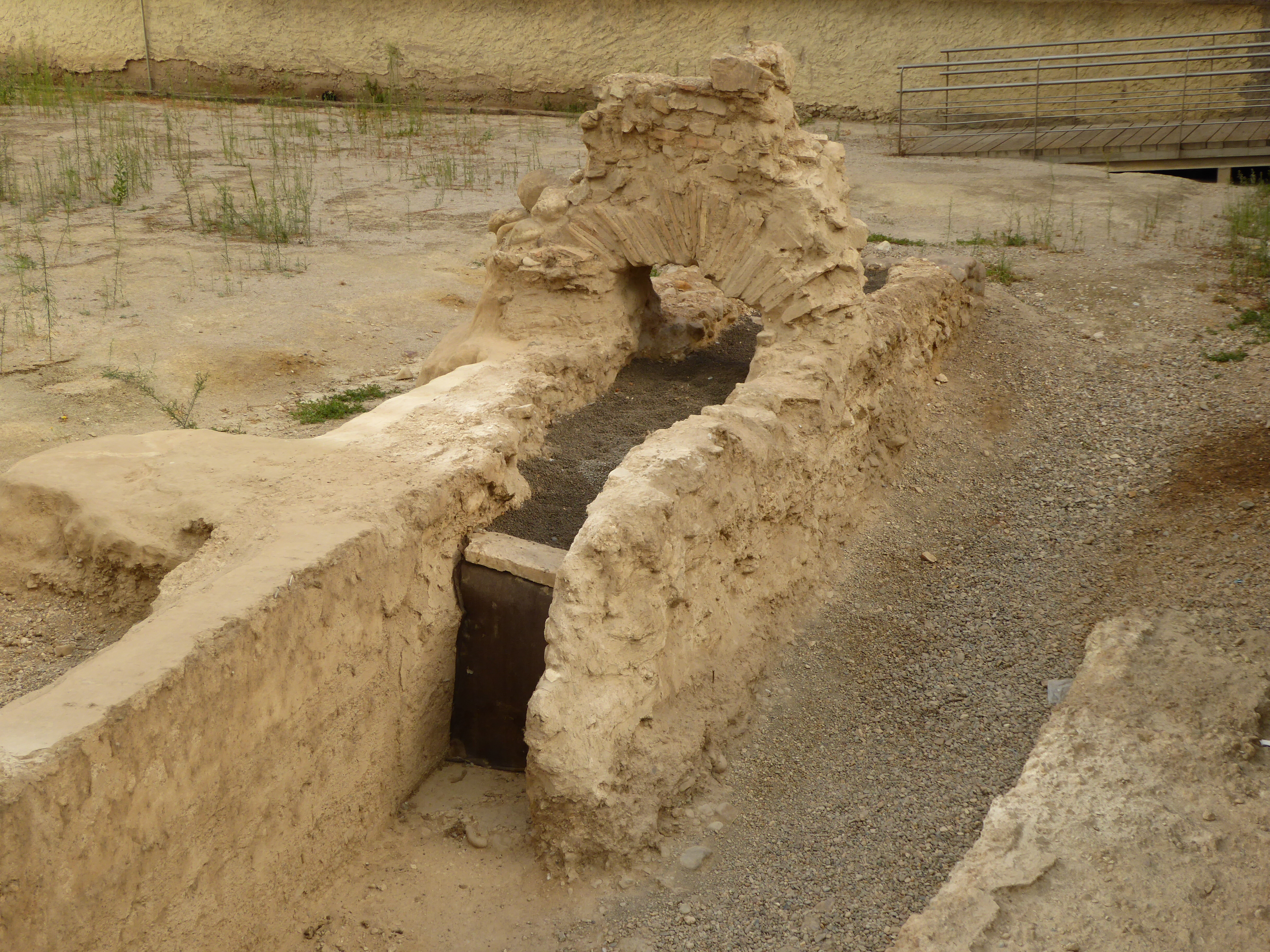
Drainage channel of the orchestra of the Roman Theater of Zaragoza (Caesaraugusta)

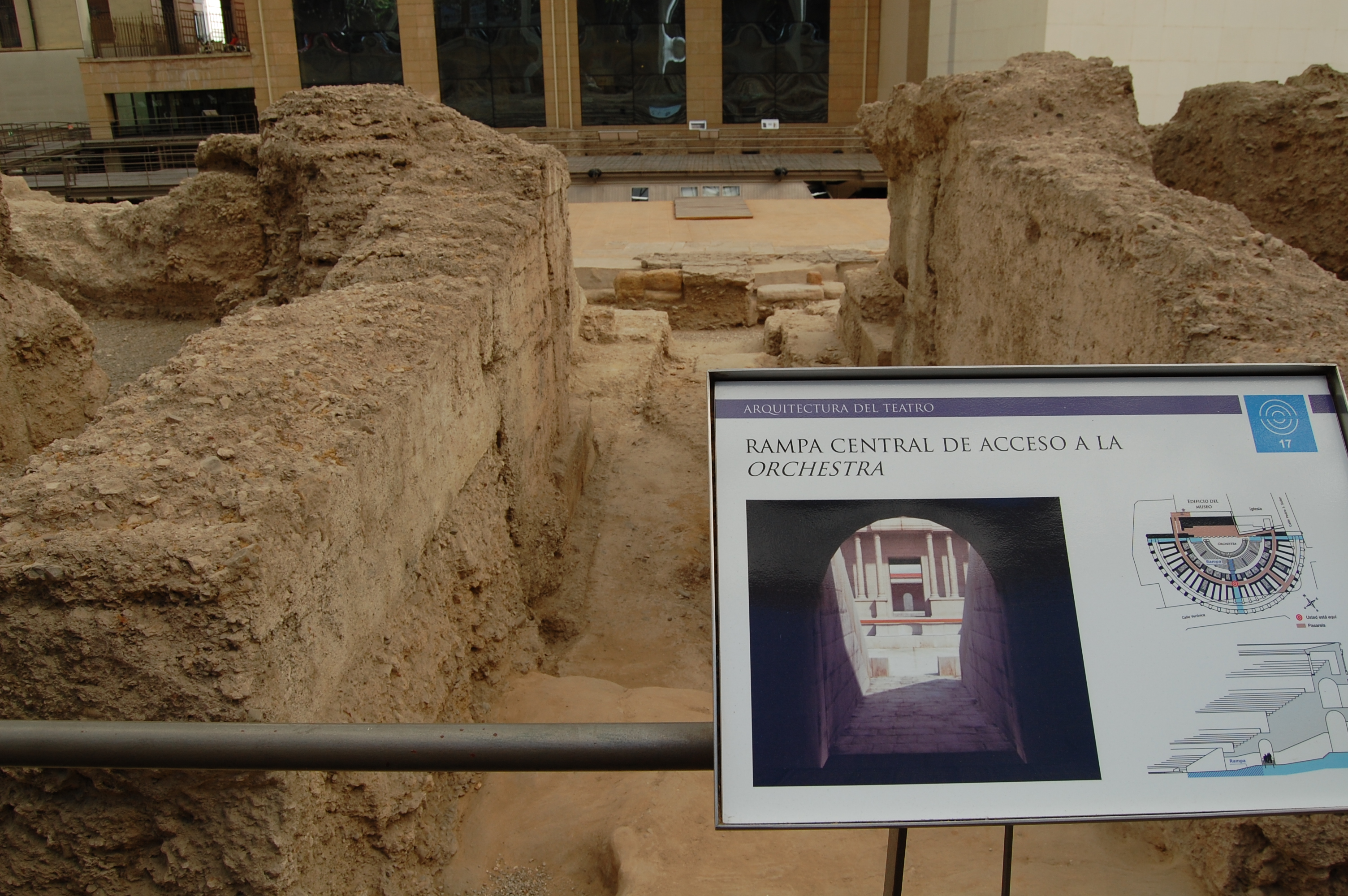
Central ramp for access to the orchestra

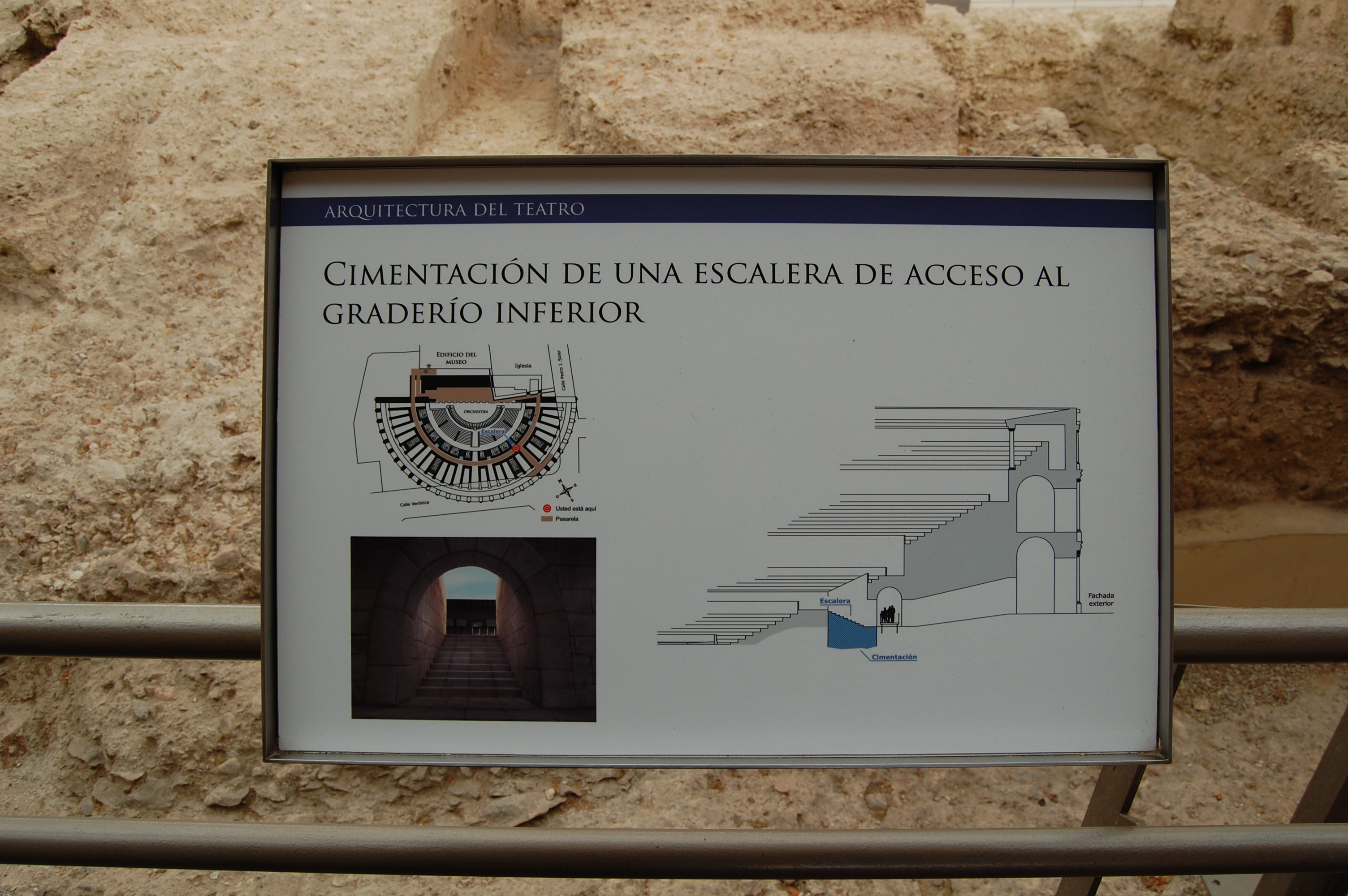

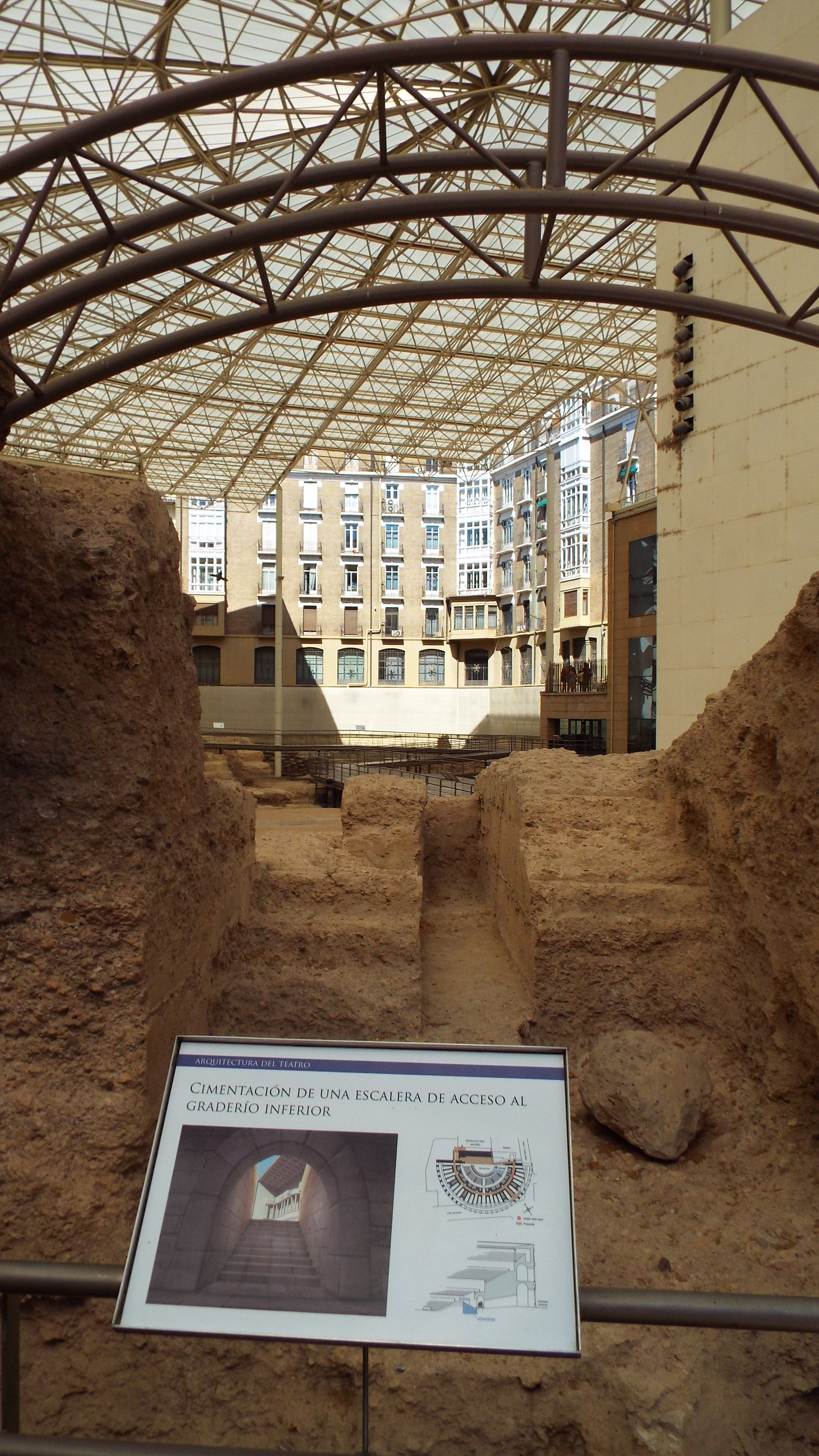
Foundation of a staircase for access to the lower stands of the theatre

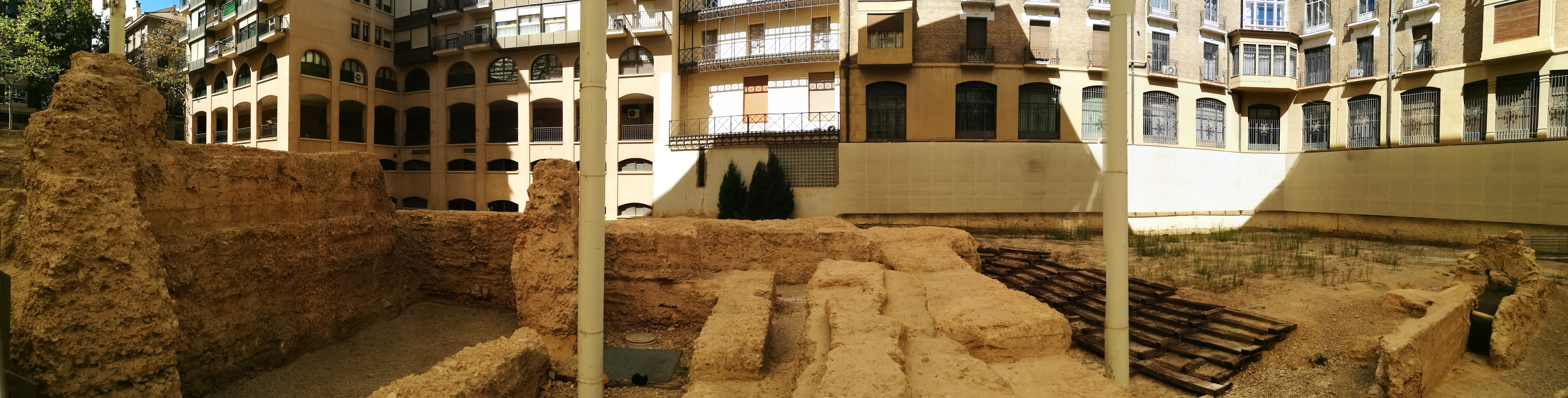
Overview of the Roman theater

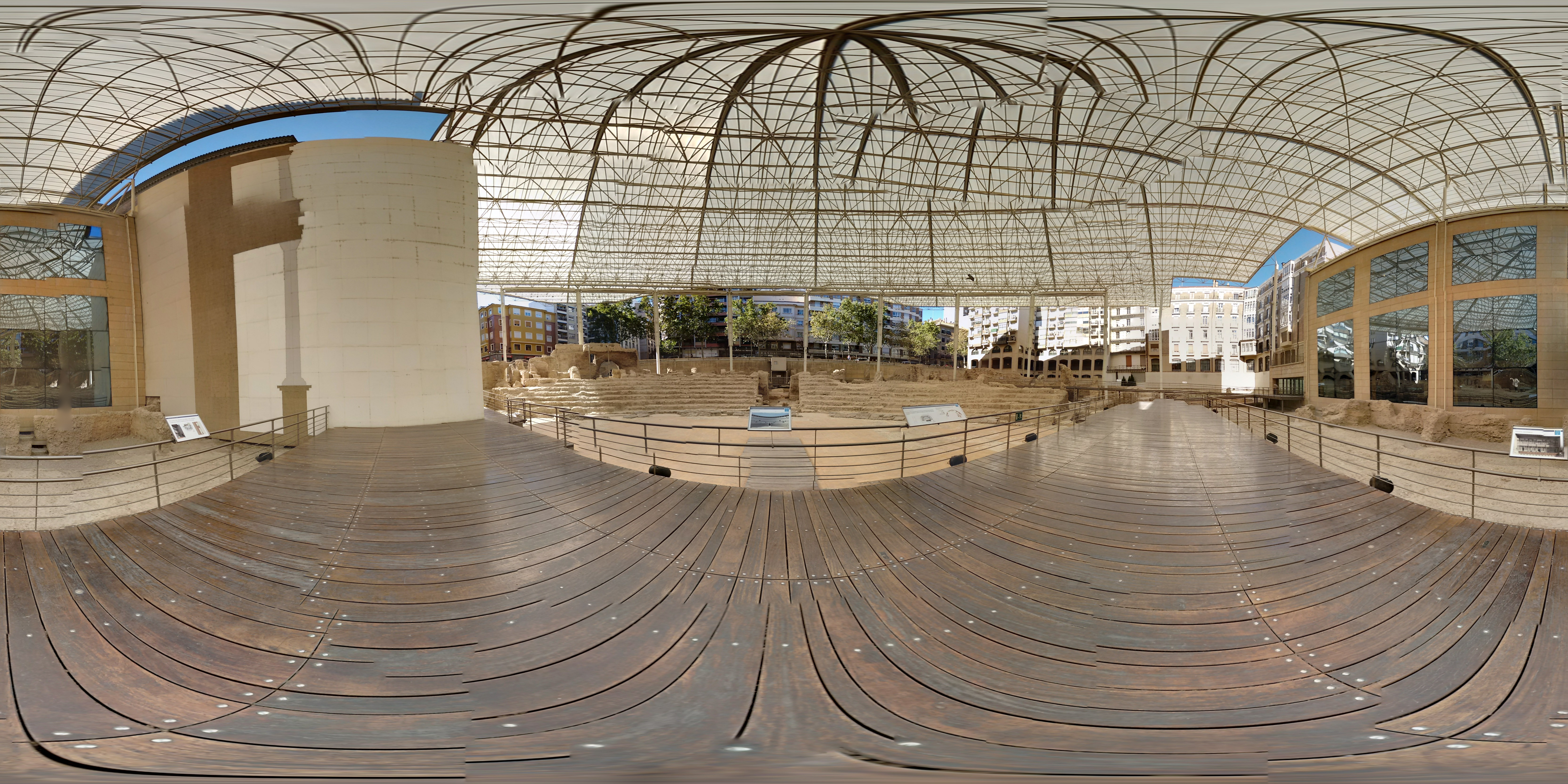
Spherical image of the Roman Theater of Zaragoza

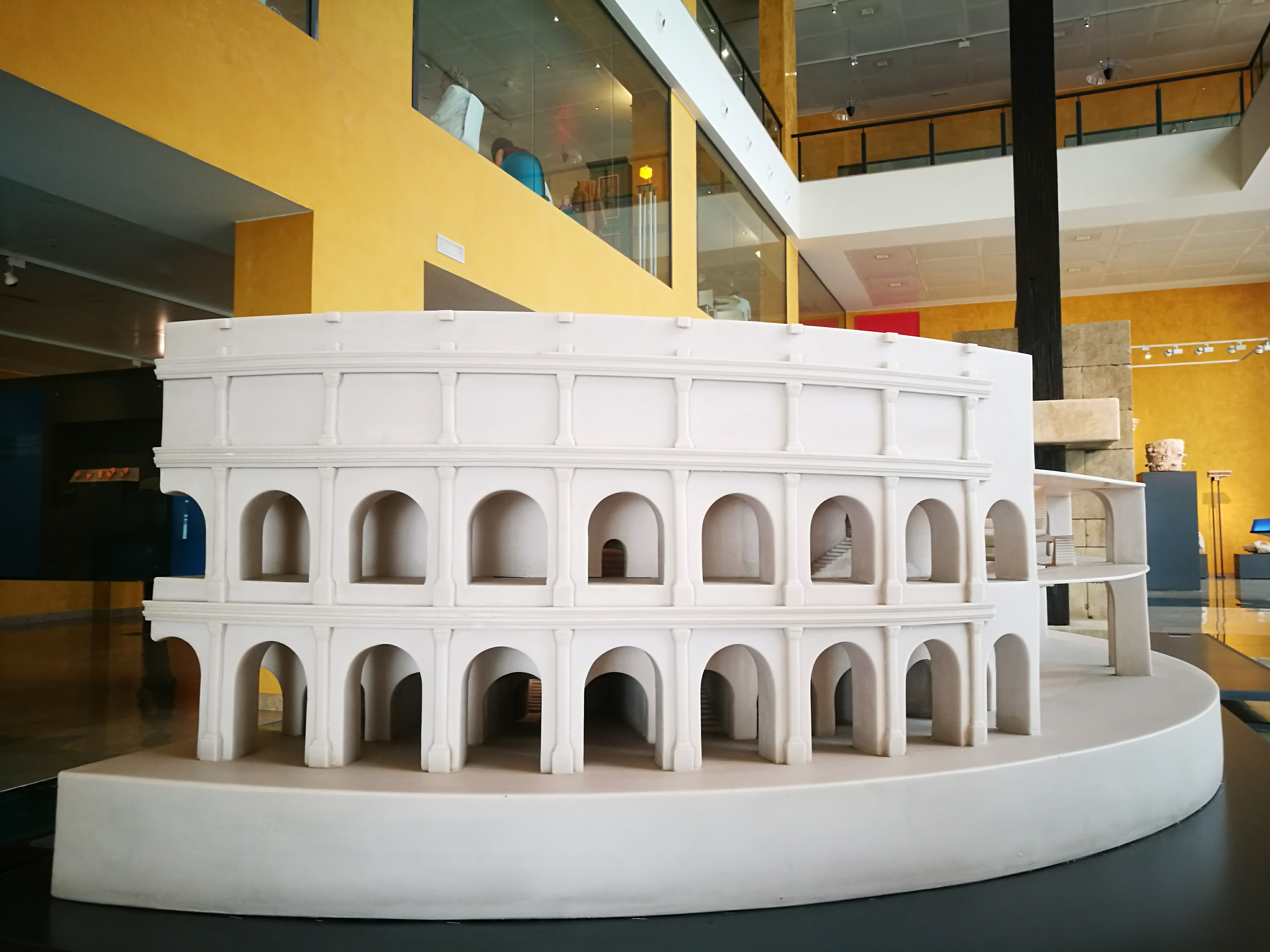

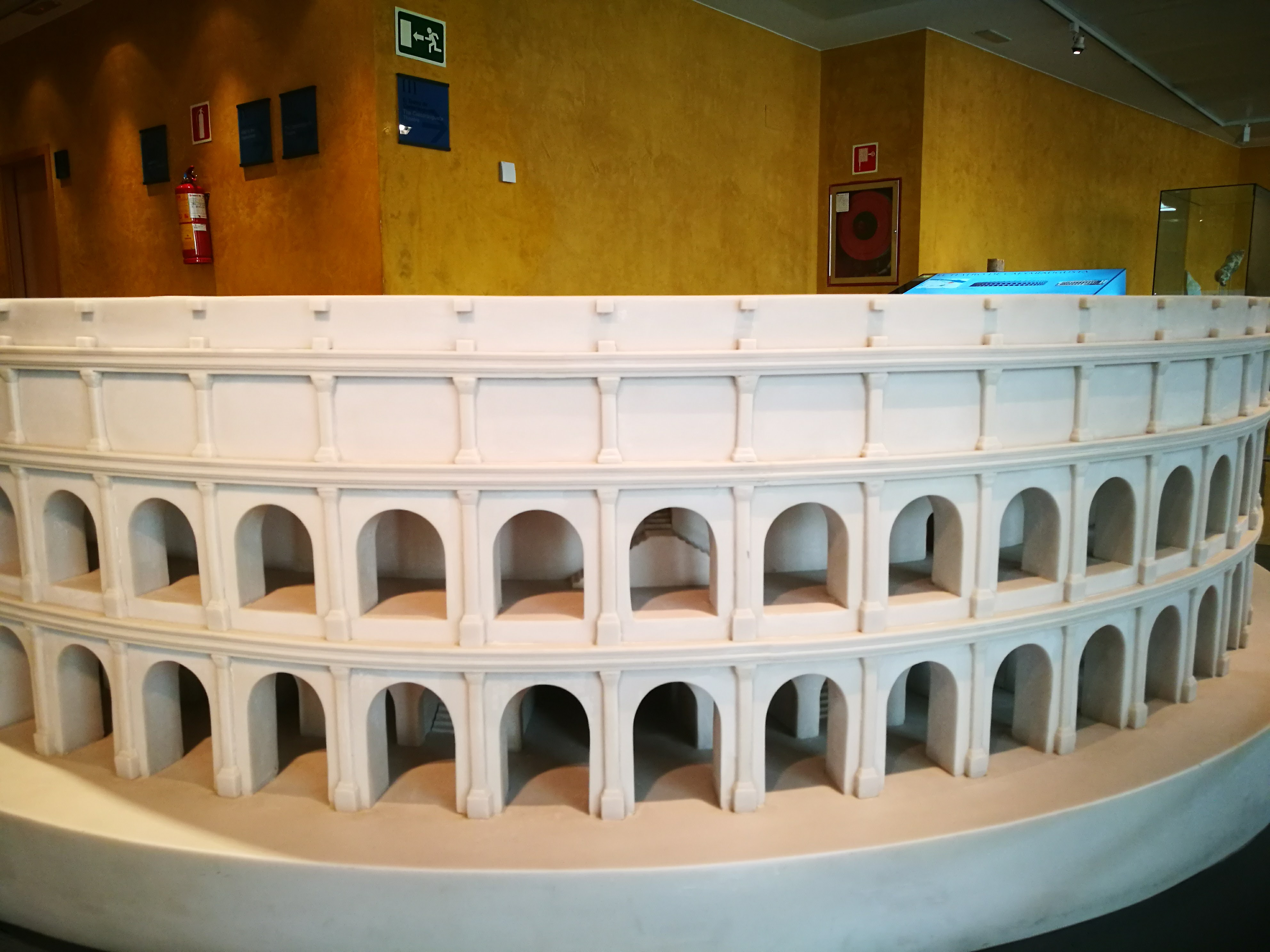
Hypothetical reconstruction of the interior circulation of the Roman theater of Zaragoza

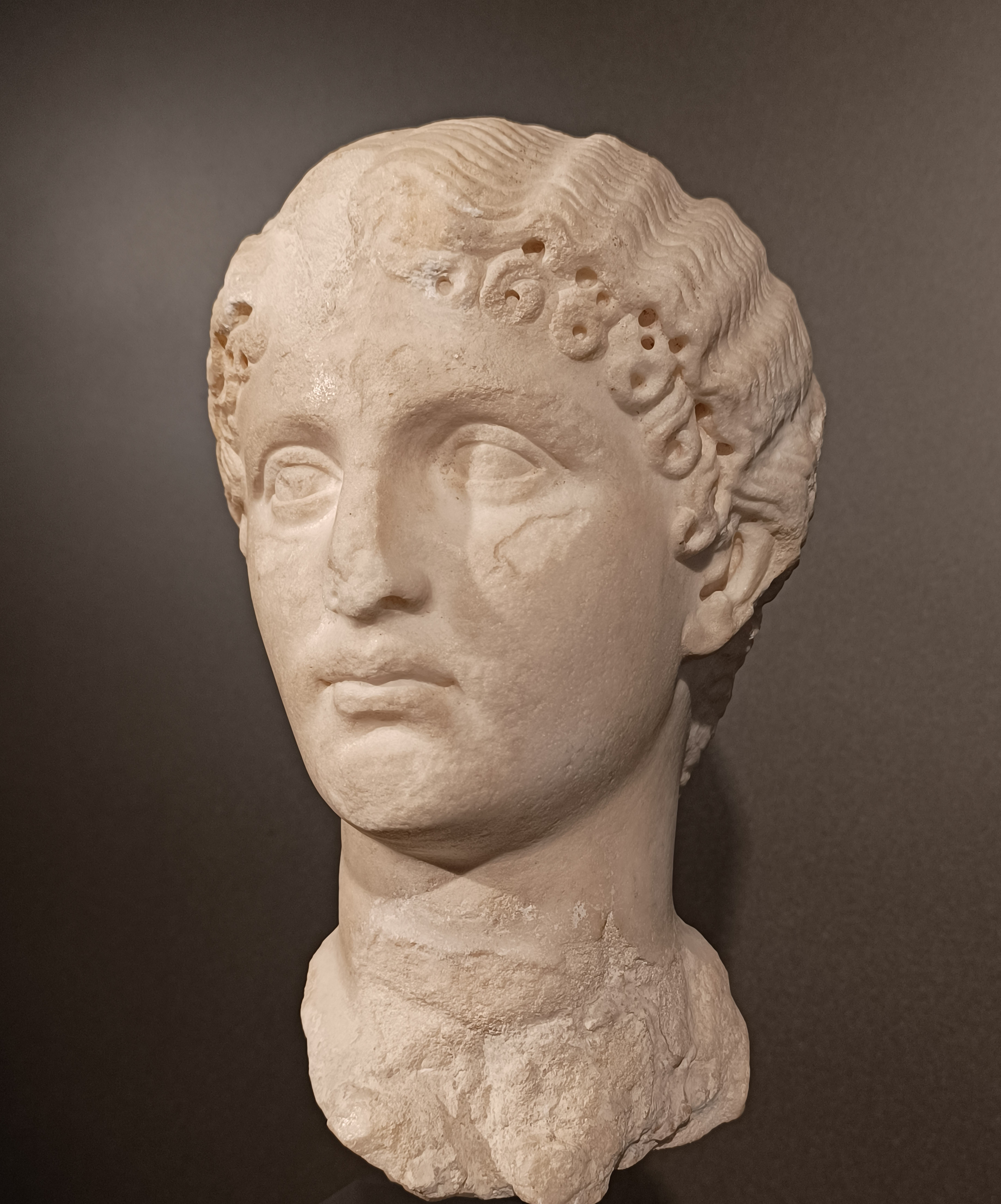
Roman theater of Zaragoza. Sculpture head of a young girl from the 1st century CE. Zaragoza, in Spain

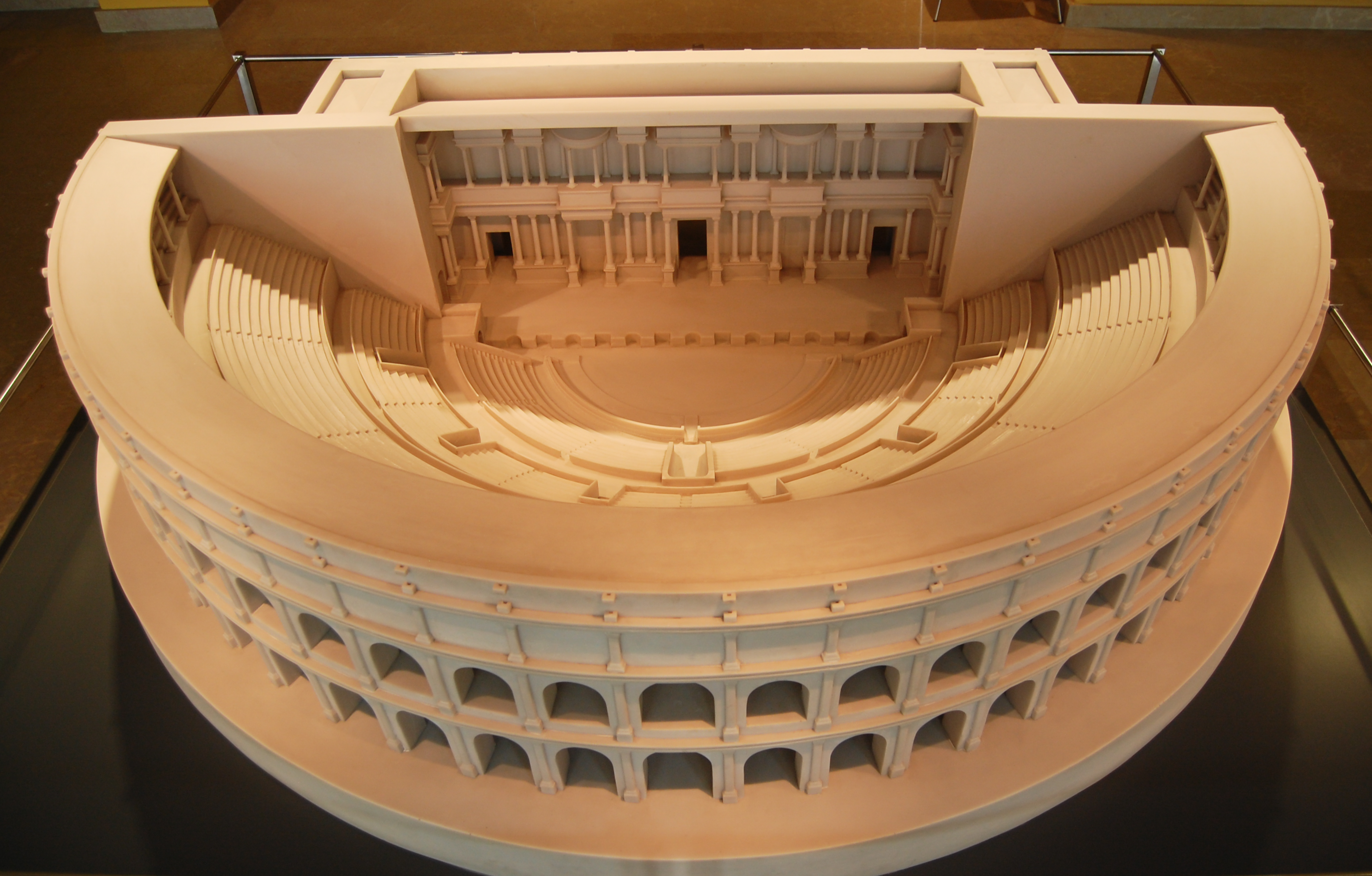
Model of the Roman theater of Zaragoza in the museum

== See also ==
- List of Roman theatres
- List of Bienes de Interés Cultural in the Province of Zaragoza
- Caesaraugusta
