= 46th César Awards =

Awards ceremony

- Official posters featuring stills from The Things of Life (1970), with Michel Piccoli and Romy Schneider
- Date: 12 March 2021
- Site: Olympia, Paris
- Hosted by: Marina Foïs

Highlights
- Best Film: Bye Bye Morons
- Best Actor: Sami Bouajila; A Son
- Best Actress: Laure Calamy; My Donkey, My Lover & I
- Most awards: Bye Bye Morons (7)
- Most nominations: Love Affair(s) (13)

Television coverage
- Network: Canal+

The 46th César Awards ceremony, presented by the Académie des Arts et Techniques du Cinéma, took place on 12 March 2021 to honour the best French films of 2020. Roschdy Zem presided, and Marina Foïs hosted the show for the first time.

== Winners and nominees ==
The nominees for the 46th César Awards were announced on 10 February 2021.

Best Film (presented by Roschdy Zem) Bye Bye Morons – Produced by Catherine Bozorgan; Directed by Albert Dupontel: Adolescents – Produced by Muriel Meynard; Sébastien Lifshitz; My Donkey, My Lover & I – Produced by Laetitia Galitzine and Aurélie Trouvé-Rouvière; Directed by Caroline Vignal; Love Affair(s) – Produced by Frédéric Niedermayer; Directed by Emmanuel Mouret; Summer of 85 – Produced by Eric Altmayer and Nicolas Altmayer; Directed by François Ozon	Best Director (presented by Charlotte Rampling) Albert Dupontel – Bye Bye Morons: Maïwenn – DNA; Sébastien Lifshitz – Adolescents; Emmanuel Mouret – Love Affair(s); François Ozon – Summer of 85
Best Actor (presented by Fanny Ardant) Sami Bouajila – A Son as Fares Ben Youssef: Jonathan Cohen – Enorme as Frédéric; Albert Dupontel – Bye Bye Morons as JB; Niels Schneider – Love Affair(s) as Maxime; Lambert Wilson – De Gaulle as Charles de Gaulle	Best Actress (presented by Valérie Lemercier) Laure Calamy – My Donkey, My Lover & I as Antoinette: Martine Chevallier – Two of Us as Madeleine; Virginie Efira – Bye Bye Morons as Suze Trappet; Camélia Jordana – Love Affair(s) as Daphné; Barbara Sukowa – Two of Us as Nina Dorn
Best Supporting Actor (presented by Nathalie Baye) Nicolas Marié – Bye Bye Morons as M. Blin: Edouard Baer – How to Be a Good Wife as André Grunvald; Louis Garrel – DNA as François; Benjamin Lavernhe – My Donkey, My Lover & I as Vladimir; Vincent Macaigne – Love Affair(s) as François	Best Supporting Actress (presented by Jeanne Balibar) Emilie Dequenne – Love Affair(s) as Louise: Fanny Ardant – DNA as Caroline; Valeria Bruni Tedeschi – Summer of 85 as Madame Gorman; Noémie Lvovsky – How to Be a Good Wife as Marie -Thérèse; Yolande Moreau – How to Be a Good Wife as Gilberte Van der Beck
Most Promising Actor (presented by Hafsia Herzi) Jean-Pascal Zadi – Tout Simplement Noir as JP: Guang Huo – La Nuit Venue as Jin; Félix Lefebvre – Summer of 85 as Alexis Robin; Benjamin Voisin – Summer of 85 as David Gorman; Alexandre Wetter – Miss as Alex	Most Promising Actress (presented by Isabelle Huppert) Fathia Youssouf – Cuties as Aminata: Mélissa Guers – The Girl with a Bracelet as Lise; India Hair – Poissonsexe as Lucle; Julia Piaton – Love Affair(s) as Victoire; Camille Rutherford – Felicità as Chloé
Best Original Screenplay (presented by Anny Duperey) Bye Bye Morons – Albert Dupontel: My Donkey, My Lover & I – Caroline Vignal; Love Affair(s) – Emmanuel Mouret; Two of Us – Filippo Meneghetti and Malysone Bovorashy; Delete History – Benoît Delépine and Gustave Kerven	Best Adaptation (presented by Pierre Lemaitre) The Girl with a Bracelet – Stéphane Demoustier based on the film The Accused by Gonzalo Tobal: Wasp Network – Olivier Assayas based on the book The Last Soldiers of the Cold War by Fernando Morais; Mama Weed – Hannelore Cayre and Jean-Paul Salomé based on the book La Daronne by Cayre; Summer of 85 – François Ozon based on the novel Dance on My Grave by Aidan Chambers; Small Country: An African Childhood – Éric Barbier based on the novel Small Country by Gaël Faye
Best First Film (presented by Virginie Efira) Two of Us – Filippo Meneghetti: My Best Part (Garçon chiffon) – Nicolas Maury; Cuties - Maïmouna Doucouré; Simply Black (Tout simplement noir) – Jean-Pascal Zadi; Arab Blues – Manele Labid	Best Cinematography (presented by Philippe Rousselot) Bye Bye Morons – Alexis Kavyrchine: Adolescents – Antoine Parouty and Paul Guilhaume; My Donkey, My Lover & I – Simon Beaufils; Love Affair(s) – Laurent Desmet; Summer of 85 – Hichame Alaouié
Best Editing (presented by Yann Dedet) Adolescents – Tina Baz: Bye Bye Morons – Christophe Pinel; My Donkey, My Lover & I – Annette Dutertre; Love Affair(s) – Marital Salomon; Summer of 85 – Laure Gardette	Best Sound (presented by Reda Kateb) Adolescents – Yolande Decarsin, Jeanne Delplancq, Fanny Martin and Olivier Goinard: Bye Bye Morons – Jean Minondo, Gurwal Coïc-Gallas and Cyril Holtz; My Donkey, My Lover & I – Guillaume Valex, Fred Demolder and Jean-Paul Hurier; Love Affair(s) – Maxime Gavaudan, François Mereu and Jean-Paul Hurier; Summer of 85 – Brigitte Taillandier, Julien Roig and Jean-Paul Hurier
Best Original Music (presented by Alain Souchon) La Nuit Venue – Rone: Bye Bye Morons – Christophe Julien; DNA – Stephen Warbeck; My Donkey, My Lover & I – Mateï Bratescot; Summer of 85 – Jean-Benoït Dunckel	Best Costume Design (presented by Corinne Masiero) How to Be a Good Wife – Madeline Fontaine: Bye Bye Morons – Mimi Lempicka; Love Affair(s) – Hélène Davoudian; De Gaulle – Anaïs Romand and Sergio Ballo; Summer of 85 – Pascaline Chavanne
Best Production Design (presented by Fary) Bye Bye Morons – Carlos Conti: How to Be a Good Wife – Thierry François; Love Affair(s) – David Faivre; De Gaulle – Nicolas De Boiscuillé; Summer of 85 – Benoît Barouh	Best Documentary Film (presented by Yolande Zauberman) Adolescents – Sébastien Lifshitz: La Cravate – Etienne Chaillou and Mathias Théry; Cyrille Agriculteur, 30 Ans, 20 Vaches, Du Lait, Du Beurre, Des Dettes – Rodolphe Marconi; Histoire D’Un Regard – Mariana Otero; Un Pays Qui Se Tient Sage – David Du Fresne
Best Animated Feature Film (presented by Chiara Mastroianni & Marjane Satrapi) Josep – Aurel: Calamity, a Childhood of Martha Jane Cannary – Rémi Chayé; Little Vampire – Joann Sfar	Best Animated Short Film (presented by Chiara Mastroianni & Marjane Satrapi) L'heure de l'Ours – Agnès Patron: Bach-Hông – Elsa Duhamel; L'Odysée de Choum – Julien Bisaro; La tête dans les orties – Paul Cabon
Best Short Film (presented by Olivier Nakache & Michel Hazanavicius) So What If the Goats Die – Sofia Alaoui: L'aventure atomique – Loïc Barché; Baltringue – Josza Anjembe; Je serais parmi les amandiers – Marie Le Floc'h; Un Adieu – Mathilde Profit	Best Foreign Film (presented by Vincent Dedienne) Another Round (Denmark) – Directed by Thomas Vinterberg: 1917 (United Kingdom, United States) – Directed by Sam Mendes; Corpus Christi (Poland, France) – Directed by Jan Komasa; Dark Waters (United States) – Directed by Todd Haynes; The August Virgin (Spain) – Directed by Jonás Trueba
Audience Award	Honorary César: Le Splendid - Josiane Balasko, Michel Blanc, Marie-Anne Chazel, Christian Clavier, Gérard Jugnot, Thierry Lhermitte & Bruno Moynot; Jean-Pierre Bacri

=== Films with multiple nominations ===
The following films received multiple nominations:

Nominations	Films
13	Love Affair(s)
12	Bye Bye Morons
12	Summer of 85
8	My Donkey, My Lover & I
6	Adolescents
5	How to Be a Good Wife
4	DNA
4	Two of Us
3	De Gaulle
2	The Girl with a Bracelet
2	Cuties
2	La Nuit Venue
2	Tout Simplement Noir

=== Performers ===
Name(s)	Song
Catherine Ringer	Je reviens te chercher
Alain Souchon	Quand je serai KO

== See also ==
- 33rd European Film Awards
