= Serge Merlin =

French actor (1932–2019)

- Born: Serge Merle; 29 December 1932; Sainte-Barbe-du-Tlélat, French Algeria
- Died: 16 February 2019 (aged 86); Paris, France
- Resting place: Père Lachaise Cemetery; Paris, France
- Occupation: Actor
- Years active: 1952–2018

Serge Merlin (born Serge Merle; 29 December 1932 – 16 February 2019) was a French actor. He became internationally known for his role in the film Amélie (2001), which received widespread critical acclaim.

On 9 July 2014, Merlin was made a Commander of the Order of the Arts and Letters.

== Filmography ==
=== Film ===
| Year | Title | Role | Director(s) |
|---|---|---|---|
| 1961 | Samson | Jakub Gold | Andrzej Wajda |
| 1968 | The Lone She Wolf | Silvio | Édouard Logereau |
| 1978 | The Song of Roland | Pair Marsile / Ganelon / Thierry | Frank Cassenti |
| 1980 | Tusk | Greyson | Alejandro Jodorowsky |
| 1980 | Penultimate Judgement | Detective | Ferenc Grunwalsky |
| 1981 | Cinématon | Himself | Gérard Courant |
| 1983 | Danton | Pierre Philippeaux | Andrzej Wajda |
| 1983 | A Love in Germany | Alker | Andrzej Wajda |
| 1987 | The Testament | Grossman | Frank Cassenti |
| 1991 | Le Brasier | Betaix | Éric Barbier |
| 1992 | The Two of Us | Napoléon | Henri Graziani |
| 1993 | Coma | Unknown | Denys Granier-Deferre |
| 1995 | The City of Lost Children | Gabriel Marie (Cyclops Leader) | Marc Caro; Jean-Pierre Jeunet |
| 1995 | Montana Blues | Macedonian | Jean-Pierre Bisson |
| 1996 | Diary of a Seducer | Robert (Gregoire's Neighbour) | Danièle Dubroux |
| 1997 | Marie from the Bay of Angels | Supervisor | Manuel Pradal 1998 Le comte de Monte Cristo Noirtier |
| 1999 | Simon, the Magician | Doctor | Ildikó Enyedi |
| 2000 | Ancient History | Mr. Bernstein | Orso Miret |
| 2001 | Amélie | Raymond Dufayel (The Glass Man) | Jean-Pierre Jeunet |
| 2003 | Memory Lane | Agostini | Fabio Carpi |
| 2004 | Strange Crime | Daniel's Father | Roberto Andò |
| 2010 | Spoken Suite | "Path to School" | Joël Brisse; Marie Vermillard |
| 2012 | The Man Who Laughs | Barkilphedro | Jean-Pierre Améris |
| 2014 | Pitchipoi | Albert | Charles Najman |
| 2015 | Me and Kaminski | Porter | Wolfgang Becker |
| 2018 | One Nation, One King | Louis XI | Pierre Schoeller |

== See also ==
- List of burials at Père Lachaise Cemetery
- List of French actors
- List of members of the Order of Arts and Letters
