= Dafroza Gauthier =

Franco-Rwandan activist (1954–2026)

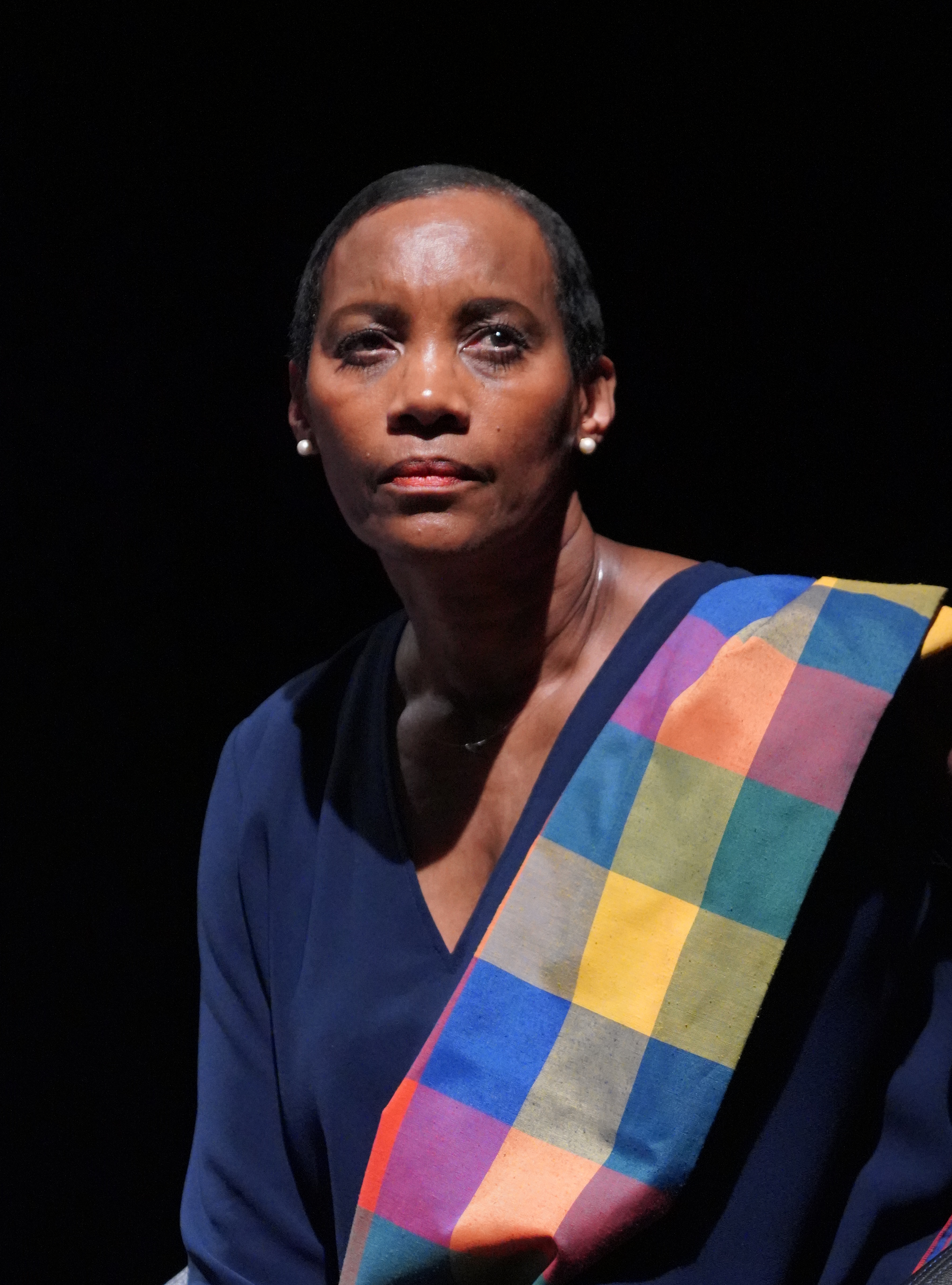
- Born: Dafroza Mukarumongi; 4 August 1954; Astrida, Kingdom of Rwanda, Ruanda-Urundi
- Died: 3 October 2026 (aged 72); Reims, France
- Education: Lycée de Kigali
- Occupations: Chemical engineer, activist
- Known for: Co-founding the Collectif des parties civiles pour le Rwanda
- Spouse: Alain Gauthier
- Awards: National Order of Exceptional Friendship (2017)

Dafroza Gauthier (née Mukarumongi; 4 August 1954 – 3 October 2026) was a Franco-Rwandan chemical engineer and activist, known for tracking down suspected perpetrators of the genocide against the Tutsi who had taken refuge in France and bringing them before the French courts.

Born into a Tutsi family in Astrida (now Butare), she lost her father in the anti-Tutsi massacres of 1963 and fled Rwanda after the 1973 coup. After a period in Burundi and Belgium, she married Alain Gauthier and settled with him in Reims. Her mother and some 80 members of her maternal family were killed during the 1994 genocide.

In 2001, she and her husband founded the Collectif des parties civiles pour le Rwanda (CPCR), which was behind almost all of the complaints lodged in France against Rwandan genocide suspects and contributed to the first genocide trials held in France from 2014 onwards. Often described as "the Klarsfelds of Rwanda", the couple were awarded Rwanda's National Order of Exceptional Friendship in 2017. She also spoke widely in schools and universities against forgetting and denial of the genocide. She died of cancer in Reims in 2026.

== Biography ==
=== Early life and education ===
Dafroza Mukarumongi was born on 4 August 1954, in Astrida, renamed Butare after independence. She came from a family of Tutsi pastoralists originally from southern Rwanda.

When she was nine, her father was killed during the massacres in Gikongoro in 1963. She took refuge in the Kibeho church to escape the massacres.

At the same time, in the early 1960s, Dafroza saw her house burnt down and her elementary school teacher beheaded. Following these tragic events, Dafroza and her mother left their home and took refuge with relatives. She therefore grew up in a predominantly female family environment.

She studied at secondary school in the Butare region before entering high school at the lycée de Kigali in Kigali, the capital of Rwanda.

=== Exile and settlement in France ===
Following the 1973 Rwandan coup d'état, Dafroza was forced into exile due to the massive pogroms suffered by the Tutsis. On her mother's advice, she left Rwanda in a hurry, fleeing with a dozen other Rwandans with the help of a priest.

With her sister, she found refuge in Burundi, first near the northern town of Kirundo, then in the former capital Bujumbura. In September 1973, she moved to Belgium, where she continued her studies with her older brother.

In 1975, she met Alain Gauthier, then a theology student teaching French at a Catholic mission in Butare. She married him in 1977 and obtained French nationality. Together, Alain, a French teacher and school principal, and Dafroza, a chemical engineer, settled in Reims, where they lived from the early 1980s. Until 1989, the Gauthier couple regularly travelled to Rwanda during the vacations with their three children to visit Dafroza's mother.

=== Personal life and death ===
Gauthier was married to Alain Gauthier, with whom she founded the Collectif des parties civiles pour le Rwanda (CPCR), and had as son-in-law the Franco-Rwandan singer and writer Gaël Faye.

Gauthier died of cancer in Reims on 3 October 2026 at the age of 72.

== Genocide against the Tutsi (1994) ==
At the end of February 1994, Dafroza made an annual trip to Kigali to see her family; while there, she witnessed the beginnings of the tutsi genocide and was forced to cut short her stay.

On 8 April 1994, her mother Suzana Mukamusoni was shot dead in front of the Charles Lwanga church in Nyamirambo, the day after the death of Rwandan president Juvénal Habyarimana. She heard the news from Father Henri Blanchard, the parish priest in Kigali.

From April to June 1994, Dafroza watched helplessly as the massacres progressed, and together with her husband, tried to alert the public through petitions, demonstrations and letters to the editor. During this period, she took in two of her cousins. In the space of a few months, almost her entire maternal family - some 80 people - was decimated.

== Pursuit of justice ==
=== First steps (1996–2001) ===
In 1996, Dafroza traveled to Rwanda with her husband Alain. She met up with a cousin who had survived the genocide, and whose husband and two children had lost their lives. During her stay, she listened in horror to the accounts of the survivors, deciding to pass on the victims' testimonies to a Parisian lawyer.

In 2001, she attended the hearings of the first post-genocide trial, known as the trial of the Butare Four. The trial was held in Brussels, where an Assize court was called upon to rule on charges brought against four Rwandans suspected of having taken part in the genocide. From that moment on, she became actively involved, alongside her husband, in the cause of justice.

On 26 April 2001, in an article published in the daily newspaper La Croix, she called on France to acknowledge "its responsibility in this troubled period of Rwanda's history."

=== Civil Parties Collective for Rwanda ===
In November 2001, together with her husband, Alain Gauthier founded the Collectif des parties civiles pour le Rwanda (CPCR). Since then, she worked to track down individuals who played an active role in the genocide and took refuge in France, and to bring them before the courts.

Because of the historical ties between Paris and the regime of Rwandan President Juvénal Habyarimana, many genocidaires found refuge in France after 1994, and for years enjoyed a complacent welcome that the Gauthiers have denounced.

The couple traveled to Rwanda three or four times a year in search of testimonies from survivors, ex-killers, and prisoners. They gathered information on the spot and compiled files which they passed on to the French justice system.

In 2007, one of the first complaints lodged by the couple concerned the doctor Eugène Rwamucyo. He was tried in October 2024 and sentenced on 30 October to 27 years' imprisonment for complicity in genocide and crimes against humanity.

Together, Alain and Dafroza Gauthier were behind almost all of the 30 or so complaints lodged in France against Rwandan nationals suspected of having taken part in the genocide of the Tutsis in Rwanda and living on French soil. They include senior civil servant Laurent Bucyibaruta, financier Félicien Kabuga, gendarme Philippe Hategekimana, colonel Aloys Ntiwiragabo, former First Lady of Rwanda Agathe Habyarimana, as well as a priest, Father Wenceslas Munyeshyaka, former parish priest of the Sainte-Famille Church in Kigali, and a doctor, gynecologist Sosthène Munyemana.

=== Trials in France ===
Dafroza Gauthier decried the slowness of the French justice system in taking up cases and carrying out investigations, which to her encourages impunity, and welcomed the creation, in January 2012, of a "genocide and crimes against humanity" unit within the Paris Tribunal de Grande Instance. The creation, in November 2013, of the Office central de lutte contre les crimes contre l'humanité, les génocides et les crimes de guerre (OCLCH) (Central Office for the Fight against Crimes against Humanity, Genocide and War Crimes) also sped up the legal proceedings.

February 2014 saw the opening of the first trial of one of the protagonists of the genocide, former Rwandan Presidential Guard officer Pascal Simbikangwa. On this occasion, Dafroza Gauthier testified before the Paris Assize Court. Pascal Simbikangwa was convicted of genocide and complicity in crimes against humanity.

In 2020, the couple, regularly dubbed "the Klarsfelds of Rwanda"–in reference to Nazi hunters Beate and Serge Klarsfeld–estimated that around a hundred genocidaires were living freely in France. While a number of genocide planners, masterminds and killers have been convicted in Rwanda, by the International Criminal Tribunal for Rwanda (ICTR), and abroad, many continue to evade justice. Kigali made some fifty extradition requests to France, but France's highest court, the Court of Cassation, consistently opposed extraditions of Rwandans suspected of involvement in the genocide, on the grounds that the law is non-retroactive.

In 2024, thirty years after the genocide and ten years after the opening of the first trials, a dozen men have been tried and sentenced in France for their participation in the genocide to sentences ranging from fourteen years' imprisonment to life imprisonment, but only three have been given final sentences, the others having appealed their convictions.

== Remembrance and recognition ==
Gauthier was a regular speaker at secondary schools and universities in order to help prevent people from forgetting and to pass on the memory of the genocide.

Through her actions, she also intended to actively combat revisionism.

We are witnesses to this memory, we are heirs to this history. In Rwanda, from 1959 to 1994, the Tutsis were killed without this being questioned. But justice helps to rehabilitate the victims, and is a weapon against forgetting and denial. Have you heard the suffering of the victims right here? It will no longer be possible to say that it didn't happen.

In November 2017, the couple were awarded the National Order of Exceptional Friendship by Rwandan President Paul Kagame in Kigali to honor their service to the Rwandan nation. She was regularly accused of being an agent of the Rwandan Patriotic Front (RPF), in the pay of President Kagame.

In 2021, she welcomed President Emmanuel Macron's recognition of France's role in the Tutsi genocide.

In 2023, a documentary film and a comic book, Rwanda, à la poursuite des génocidaires, retraced the Gauthier couple's struggle as the sixth Rwanda genocide trial opened in Paris on November 13 of that year.

In 2024, she took part in the commemoration of the thirtieth anniversary of the Tutsi genocide.

== See also ==
- Collectif des parties civiles pour le Rwanda (CPCR)
- Gacaca court
