= Maruschka Detmers =

Dutch actress (born 1962)

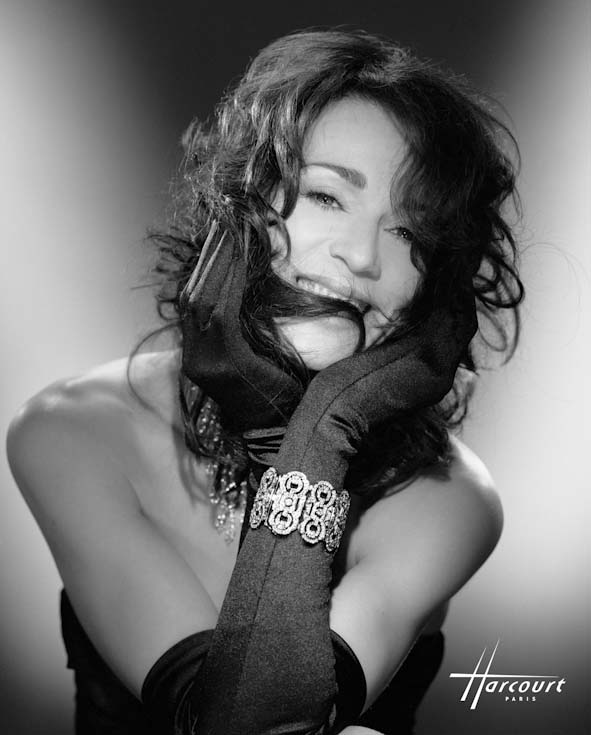
Maruschka Detmers in 2005

Maruschka Detmers (born 16 December 1962, Schoonebeek) is a Dutch actress. She moved to France as a teenager after finishing school, where she captured the attention of director Jean-Luc Godard. In 1983, she made her dramatic debut under Godard's direction in Prénom Carmen. Other noteworthy films include Hanna's War (1988) and The Mambo Kings (1992), but she is best known for her role in Devil in the Flesh (1986).

== Family ==
Detmers is the mother of actress Jade Fortineau (born 1991) by her relationship with French actor Thierry Fortineau.

== Filmography ==
- First Name: Carmen (1983)
- Le Faucon (1983)
- La Pirate (1984)
- La vengeance du serpent à plumes (1984)
- Via Mala (1985, mini TV series)
- Lime Street (1985, TV series)
- Il diavolo in corpo (1986)
- Come sono buoni i bianchi (1988)
- Hanna's War (1988)
- Deux (1989)
- Comédie d'été (1989)
- Le Brasier (1991)
- Armen and Bullik (1992, TV)
- The Mambo Kings (1992)
- Elles n'oublient jamais (1994)
- The Shooter (1995)
- Méfie-toi de l'eau qui dort (1996)
- Comme des rois (1997)
- Rewind (1998)
- Clarissa (1998, TV)
- St. Pauli Night (1999)
- Sommergewitter (1998, TV)
- Pour l'amour du ciel (2000)
- Te quiero (2001)
- Zugvögel der Liebe (2001, TV)
- Mère, fille: mode d'emploi (2002, TV)
- Jean Moulin, une affaire française (2003, TV)
- Capitaine Lawrence (2003, TV)
- Mata Hari, la vraie histoire (2003, TV)
- Mon fils cet inconnu (2004, TV)
- Le Père Goriot (2004, TV)
- Disparition (2005, TV)
- Nos 18 ans (2008)
- Robert Zimmermann wundert sich über die Liebe (2008)
- Ventoux (2015)
