= Thierry Fortineau =

French actor (1953–2006)

- Born: 9 February 1953; Nantes
- Died: 8 February 2006 (aged 52)
- Occupation: Actor
- Partner: Maruschka Detmers

Thierry Fortineau (9 February 1953 – 8 February 2006) was a French actor in television and fim.

Fortineau was born in Nantes. In the year of 1990, he was nominated for a César Award for Most Promising Actor at the 15th César Awards for his role in Comédie d'été. The award, however, went to Yvan Attal. In 1993, he starred in a television movie about Jules Ferry. In 1994, he was nominated for a Molière Award for Best Actor for his role in Le Visiteur.

Thierry Fortineau is the father of actress Jade Fortineau, born in 1991, from his relationship with Dutch actress Maruschka Detmers. He died from cancer in Paris one day before his 53rd birthday, and was interred at the Père Lachaise Cemetery.

== Selected filmography ==
- Le Brasier (1991)
- Un coeur qui bat (A Beating Heart, 1991)
- La Fille de l'air (1992)
- L'homme de ma vie (1992)
