= Little Vampire =

2020 French animated film

- Theatrical release poster
- French: Petit Vampire
- Directed by: Joann Sfar
- Written by: Sandrina Jardel; Joann Sfar
- Produced by: Joann Sfar; Antoine Delesvaux (executive)
- Starring: Louise Lacoste; Camille Cottin; Alex Lutz; Jean-Paul Rouve; Claire de La Rüe du Can; Quentin Faure; Joann Sfar
- Edited by: Benjamin Massoubre
- Music by: Olivier Daviaud
- Production companies: Autochenille Productions; StudioCanal; France 3 Cinéma; Panache Productions; Compagnie Cinématographique
- Distributed by: StudioCanal
- Release date: 21 October 2020
- Running time: 82 minutes
- Countries: France; Belgium
- Language: French
- Box office: $1.6 million

Little Vampire (French: Petit Vampire) is a French traditional animated fantasy comedy horror film written by Sandrina Jardel and Joann Sfar and directed by Sfar (who also acted as executive producer), based on Sfar's comic book series of the same name. Released on 21 October 2020, the film was nominated for Best Animated Film at the 46th César Awards.

== Plot ==
Pandora, a beautiful young woman and her son seek to escape from a prince, who is in love with Pandora; he is furious to see that she already had a child and seeks to deliver them to the God of Nothingness, a gigantic slimy monster. When all seems lost for Pandora and her son, a skeleton pirate, the Captain of the Dead flies to their rescue because Pandora promised to give her life to whoever would save her child. Once on board the Captain's boat, whose mermaid acts as a figurehead named Sleeping Belle and is populated by monsters of all kinds, Pandora and her son transform into vampires and become living dead who will never age, but the God of Nothingness, furious at not having had his fresh flesh to eat, devours the soldiers. Prince begs to spare him and the monster accepts; after having swallowed him, transforms him into a being with a head of moon baptized the Gibbous and allows him to seek revenge on Pandora and the Captain of the Dead.

Since Gibbous is capable of killing the undead, the Captain of the Dead has no choice but to flee with Pandora and her son who has taken the name of "Little Vampire" through the world and the different eras, during which they meet the monsters Marguerite (a creature inspired by Frankenstein's monster), Claude (a radioactive crocodile), Fantomate (a tomato-dog) and Ophtalmo (a monster inventor) who join them, before ending up hiding in a mansion on a small hill in town where the Captain creates a dome making them invisible to everyone.

300 years later, Little Vampire begins to get tired of the film club where he goes daily with the other monsters as well as their incessant arguments. He then decides to run away with Fantomate to go to school where he wants to meet children. Little Vampire meets Michel, an orphan who lives with his grandparents and believes in monsters, through a mathematics notebook. Little Vampire begins to do his homework for him without any fault and corresponds with him who ends up wanting to meet him. He then goes to Michel's without noticing that he has taken with him a kawai (humans turned into bugs by the Gibbous) stuck in the notebook. Once at Michel's, Little Vampire wakes him up and the two boys get to know each other, but on returning, Little Vampire and Fantomate come across the Gibbous (which Fantomate thought they had managed to get rid of) and manage to escape him. Little Vampire then confides in Pandora about the Gibbous, keeping the fact that he visited a human.

Taking advantage of a game with Marguerite, Claude and Ophtalmo, Little Vampire decides to go to Michel's to ensure his safety against the advice of Fantomate who no longer wants to go out because of the Gibbous. The dog then decides to go and confess everything to Pandora and the Captain of the Dead; the latter orders Fantomate and the monsters to bring Michel back in order to "ensure his silence". Michel and Little Vampire go outside, where they are joined by the other monsters that the vampire passes off as his cousins. Michel is then invited to meet the Captain of the Dead who, finding him sympathetic, makes him swear with a pirate oath to be a faithful friend to Little Vampire and never to reveal his existence to anyone.

At first, Michael and the monsters get along well, but Little Vampire is disappointed that Michael isn't a monster. Ophtalmo then proposes to transform Michel into a monster but the operation proves to be very dangerous, and Michel flees home. At night, he is surprised by the appearance of Gibbous who, knowing that Michel has been dating his prey for a long time, blackmails him: if he does not reveal to him where Little Vampire and Pandora are hiding, he will kill his grandparents.

While Little Vampire, Fantomate, Marguerite, Claude and Ophtalmo are arguing about Michel, they later see him on a surveillance camera in Little Vampire's room where he leaves a message from Gibbous. Fantomate accuses him of betraying his oath and tries to hurt him but Michel gives up protecting his grandparents and withdraws the message but he falls into a trap door which leads him to Little Vampire and the monsters. Little Vampire then decides to go and confront the Gibbous so that he can no longer terrorize them; after having awakened Sleeping Belle, he leaves with Michel, Marguerite, Claude and Ophtalmo on the Captain's boat in search of that of the Gibbous which is moored in Michel's garden. When they arrive at their destination, they are captured: Michel and the monsters are stuffed in a bag while Little Vampire is brought to the Gibbous.

Worried, Fantomate warns Pandora and the Captain of the Dead that the Gibbous have captured Little Vampire, Michel and the monsters. The latter, followed by the Captain's crew, come to their rescue, meeting Michel's grandparents on the way. Finding his boat, the Captain finds that the Gibbous has put Sleeping Belle to sleep. It is then that the latter arrives and kidnaps Pandora under the eyes of Fantomate and the Captain.

Transformed into a mouse, Little Vampire frees his friends with whom he faces the Gibbous kawais while the Captain and the Gibbous engage in a duel that Pandora, out of patience, ends up interrupting. The latter declares that it cannot go on like this but the Gibbous bursts into tears at the idea of having to stop wanting revenge and admits that he needs company, otherwise he becomes mean. Little Vampire explains to him that he was also bored until he met Michel and that in order to be loved by another person, he must agree and must not be forced. The kawaïs come to confirm it because they like the Gibbous even if he likes to crush them. Gibbous, convinced, recognizes that Pandora loves the Captain because he saved her but he does not know what to do because the sleeping princesses who must be awakened are rare. It is then that Little Vampire shows her Sleeping Belle and the Gibbous ends up waking her up; Sleeping Belle frees herself from the ship and takes the hand of the Gibbous who becomes the prince again. Under the moved gaze of Little Vampire, the prince and Sleeping Belle decide to flee death in turn with love while the kawais decide to build their democracy.

The next day, Michel reveals to his teacher and his class the trickery of Little Vampire and promises to get back to work, then he goes to the beach to find Little Vampire, Fantomate, Marguerite, Claude and Ophtalmo and they start playing under the eyes of Pandora and the Captain of the Dead who can now leave their mansion without fear.

== Voice cast ==
=== French dub ===
- Louise Lacoste as Little Vampire - a 10 year old boy who became a vampire and is best friends with Michel.
  - Lacoste also voices Sleeping Belle - the Captain's sentient figurehead who is jealous of Pandora.
- Claire de la Rüe du Can as Michel Douffon - an orphaned boy who lives with his grandparents and is best friends with Little Vampire.
- Quentin Faure as Fantomate - Little Vampire's red flying dog who protects his friend from danger.
- Joann Sfar as Marguerite - a Frankenstein-like monster who is very childish and loves playing with poo.
- Vincent Vermignon as Ophtalmo - a three-eyed creature that acts like a gentleman.
- Ricardo Lo Giudice as Claude - a mutated alligator who has a short temper.
- Camille Cottin as Pandora - Little Vampire's beautiful and caring mother who married the Captain of the Dead.
- Jean-Paul Rouve as The Captain of the Dead - a skeletal sea captain that rescued Little Vampire and his mother from death a long time ago, later marrying Pandora and acting as a fatherly figure to Little Vampire.
- Alex Lutz as The Gibbous - the Captain's immortal rival who became a crescent moon creature to eternity live so he'll have vengeance on the Captain and force Pandora to love him.
- Katia Tchenko as Daïna - Michel's classmate who he has a crush on.
- Sava Lolov as Grandma - Michel's grandmother.
- Mara Taquin as Grandpa - Michel's grandfather.

=== English dub ===
- Courtney Shaw as Little Vampire & Sleeping Belle
- Samantha Cooper as Pandora
- Mark Rivers as The Captain of the Dead
- Francesca Calo as Michael
- Gary Littman as Phantomato
- Danish Farooqui as Marguerite
- James Brown Jr. as Ophtamol
- Leo Wiggins as The Gibbous

== Release ==
Little Vampire was released in France on 21 October 2020 (created in 2019 according to IMDb), where it grossed $1,566,207 for a worldwide $1,678,270. Critically, it received positive reviews, and was nominated for Best Animated Film at the 46th César Awards.
