= Le Brasier =

1991 French film

- Theatrical release poster
- Directed by: Éric Barbier
- Written by: Éric Barbier; Jean-Pierre Barbier
- Starring: Jean-Marc Barr; Maruschka Detmers; Thierry Fortineau
- Cinematography: Thierry Arbogast
- Edited by: Jennifer Augé
- Music by: José Padilla; Frédéric Talgorn
- Production companies: Flach Film; Films A2; Sofica Lumière
- Distributed by: Warner Bros.
- Release date: 30 January 1991
- Running time: 124 minutes
- Country: France
- Language: French

Le Brasier is a French film directed by Éric Barbier, released in 1991. This was the first full-length feature film directed by Barbier. Based around the social struggles of a mining area in the 1930s, Le Brasier was the first French film to have a budget of more than 100 million francs, the highest budget in the history of French cinema at that point. The film was a commercial disaster, selling less than 40,000 tickets in the Paris region.

== Details ==
- Original title: Le Brasier
- Director: Éric Barbier
- Writers: Éric Barbier, Jean-Pierre Barbier
- Length: 122 minutes
- Format : Colour
- Photography : Thierry Arbogast
- Executive producer: Jean-François Lepetit
- Release date: France: 30 January 1991

== Starring ==
- Jean-Marc Barr as Victor
- Maruschka Detmers as Alice
- Thierry Fortineau as Emile
- François Hadji-Lazaro as Gros
- Serge Merlin as Betaix
- Tolsty as Piotr Pavlak
- Jean-Paul Roussillon as Dalmas

== Shooting ==
- The film was shot in three countries: Belgium (notably at Charleroi), Poland (Świętochłowice - Lipiny) and France (at Saint-Étienne mines)
