= Small Country =

2016 novel by Gaël Faye

- Author: Gaël Faye
- Audio read by: Dominic Hoffman
- Original title: Petit pays
- Translator: Sarah Ardizzone
- Language: French
- Genre: Literary fiction, coming of age
- Set in: 1990s Bujumbura
- Publisher: Éditions Grasset
- Publication date: August 2016
- Pages: 192

Small Country (French: Petit pays) is the debut novel by the Franco-Rwandan rapper, songwriter and novelist, Gaël Faye, set in the country of his birth, Burundi. It was first published in France in August 2016 by Grasset, and has since been translated into 36 languages. Translated into English in 2018 by Sarah Ardizzone, the English audiobook is narrated by Dominic Hoffman.

== Process ==
Small Country is Faye's debut novel. Faye, who writes music, said in an interview that he felt there were some limits to poetry that prose would better capture. His song, ‘L’ennui des après midi sans fin’ (transl. The boredom of never ending afternoons), is about childhood and the loss of innocence; Faye found himself wanting to expand on that idea with a novel. Although initially hesitant, he was encouraged to try writing more about his life by editor Catherine Nabokov. In order to help himself bridge the gap to novel writing, Faye included epistolary-style letters in Small Country.

Faye has said that he did not find it difficult to write about the Rwandan genocide, considering it is a part of everyday life in Rwanda, a country he visits frequently. According to Faye, he feels that Small Country actually minimizes the extent of the trauma inflicted from the genocide.

Events in contemporary France, such as the 2015 Charlie Hebdo shooting, reminded Faye of his tumultuous childhood in Burundi. The title, Small Country (French: Petit pays), refers to one of Faye's songs, Petit Pays.

== Summary ==
Small Country opens with the 33-year-old narrator, Gabriel, reflecting on his life in France. Unable to let go of his past, Gabriel makes the decision to return to Burundi, the country of his childhood, as the novel's main story begins.

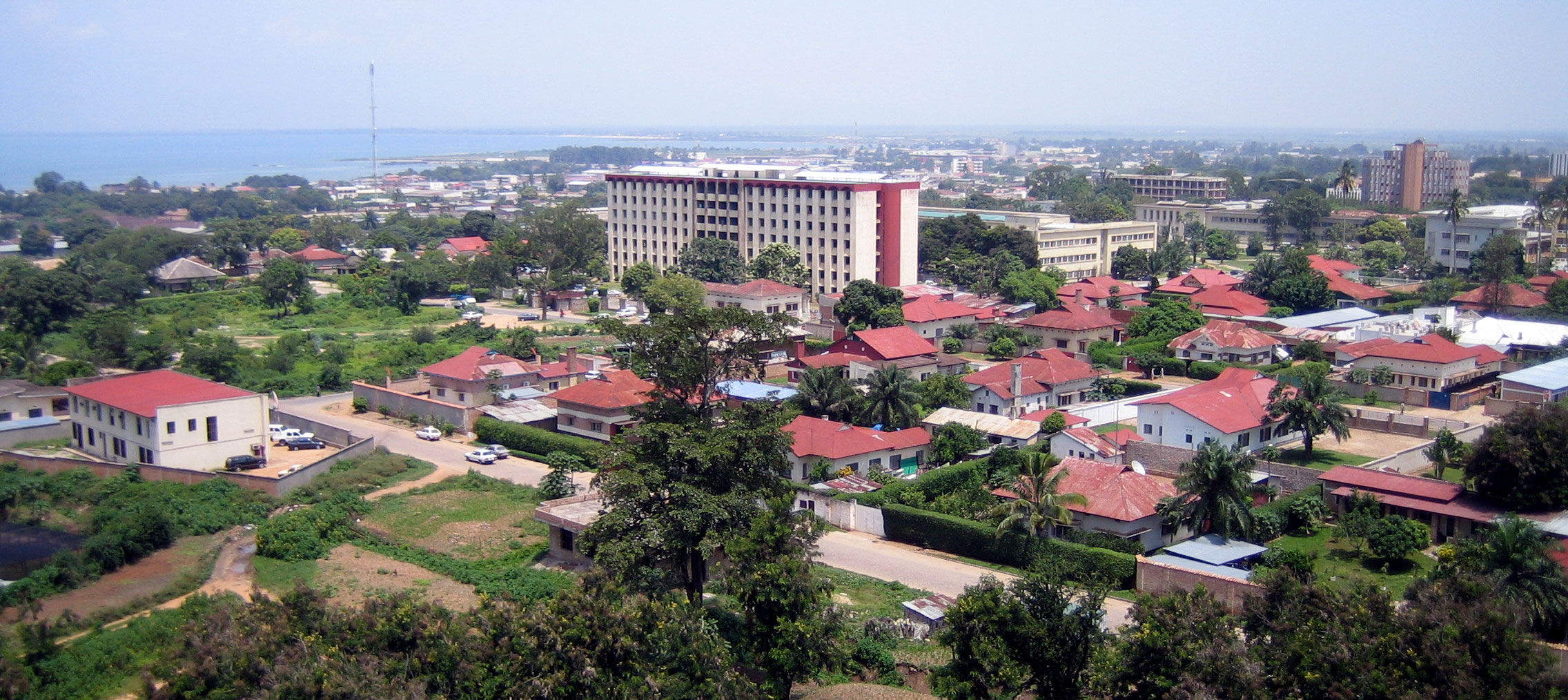
Bujumbura, the setting for the majority of the novel, in 2006, about 13 years later

Set in Burundi and Rwanda from 1993 onwards, the novel is subsequently narrated by ten-year-old Gaby, who lives with his French father and Rwandan mother in an impasse in a comfortable district of Bujumbura, Burundi. Gabriel's sheltered upbringing leaves him oblivious to the increasing tensions between the Hutu majority and the Tutsi minority (to which he, through his mother, belongs). As neighboring Rwanda faces the outbreak of civil war and genocide, which spill over into Burundi, the innocence of Gaby and his group of friends is brutally shattered.

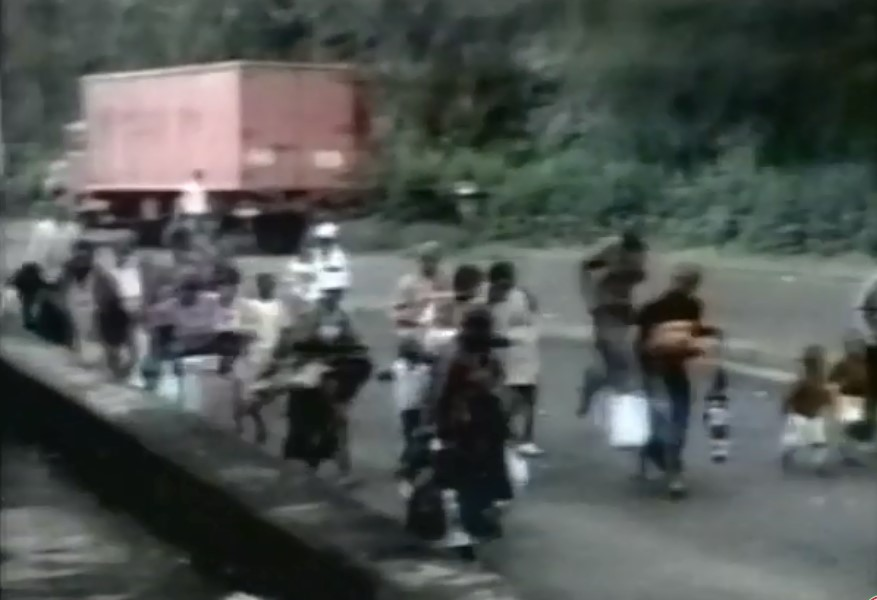
Internally displaced persons flee during the 1993 Burundian genocide, an event that is featured in the novel

== Literary devices ==
The novel is based on Gaël Faye's own experiences growing up in Burundi during this period; the author has, however, stressed that it is not strictly autobiographical. On the topic, Faye has said that "I think every novel is a form of autobiography." The similarities between Faye and the character of Gaby are purposeful, but also not identical. Faye used his advantage of adult perspective to write about a boy who went through a similar situation to him as a child.

=== Child's perspective ===
The novel has been praised on its use of a child's point of view. The narrator, Gaby, is between 10 and 11 for much of the story. Using the perspective of a child can introduce a sense of naivety. A review published in Words Without Borders praises Gaby's perspective as being able to simplify the conflict into its basic roots.

== Reception ==
The novel was very well-received upon its publication in France, selling 700,000 copies. It was shortlisted for the Prix Goncourt in 2016, as well as for awards by Fémina, Médicis, Interallié, the Académie française and Renaudot. In the same year, it won the Prix Goncourt des lycéens, chosen by lycée students (typically from 15-18 years of age).

An English translation, Small Country, was translated by Sarah Ardizzone and published in 2018 by Hogarth Press. The English translation also received favourable reviews and was longlisted for the 2019 Aspen Words Literary Prize and the 2019 Andrew Carnegie Medals for Excellence in Fiction and Non-Fiction. In April 2019 it was shortlisted for the 2019 Albertine Prize. Writing in The Guardian, Anthony Cummins called the work "a sharp shock of a novel"; he also, however, expressed disappointment at certain elements of Faye's use of characters, noting that "Faye seems to squander the dramatic potential that a child's point of view might bring."

The novel has also been translated into Irish, Italian, Serbian, Portuguese and into the official language of Burundi, Kirundi.

Small Country's English edition has been criticized for its awkward prose. In a review for Kirkus Books, the critic writes that the language is not strong throughout the book, and is unable to pinpoint this to Faye himself or the translator Ardizzone.

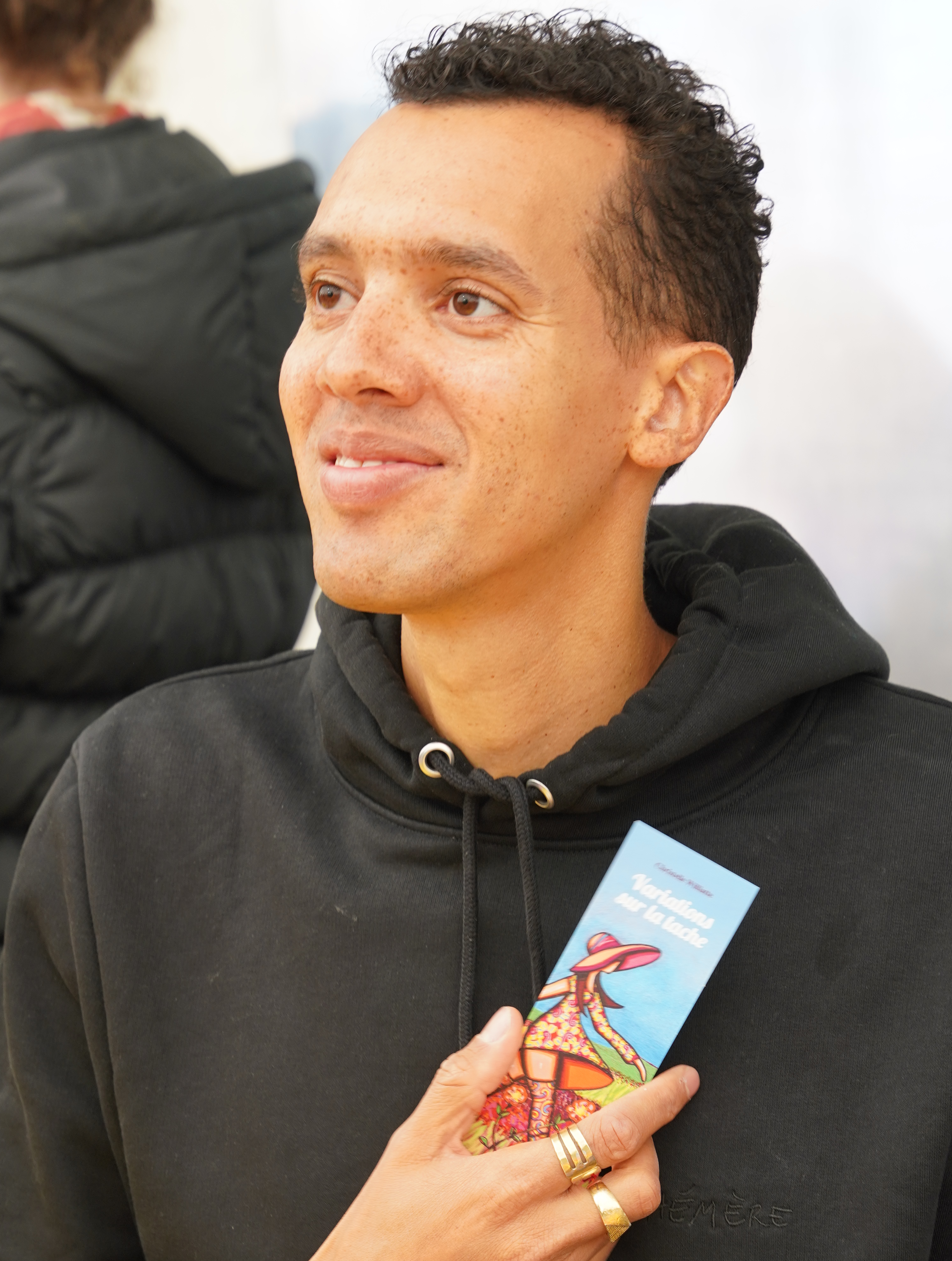
Gaël Faye, the author, in 2024

=== Awards and honors ===
- 2016 Prix du roman Fnac
- 2016 Prix du Premier Roman
- 2016 Prix Goncourt des Lycéens
- 2016 Prix France Culture/Télérama
- 2019 Aspen Words Literary Prize longlist (English translation)
- 2019 Andrew Carnegie Medals for Excellence in Fiction and Non-Fiction longlist (English translation)
- 2019 Albertine Prize shortlist (English translation)

== Film adaptation ==
In 2020, the novel was adapted into the film Small Country: An African Childhood, directed by Éric Barbier. Although Faye has, on multiple occasions, stressed that Small Country is not autobiographical, the film was marketed as a "true story." Djibril Vancoppenolle plays the main character, Gaby.

== See also ==
- 1993 ethnic violence in Burundi
- Rwandan genocide
