= Bye Bye Morons =

2020 comedy film

- Film poster
- French: Adieu les cons
- Directed by: Albert Dupontel
- Screenplay by: Albert Dupontel
- Produced by: Catherine Bozorgan
- Starring: Virginie Efira; Albert Dupontel; Nicolas Marié
- Cinematography: Alexis Kavyrchine
- Edited by: Christophe Pinel
- Music by: Christophe Julien
- Production companies: Stadenn Prod.; Manchester Films; Gaumont; France 2 Cinéma
- Release date: October 21, 2020 (France)
- Running time: 87 minutes
- Country: France
- Language: French
- Box office: $17 million

Bye Bye Morons (French: Adieu les cons) is a 2020 French comedy drama film written and directed by Albert Dupontel. The film stars Virginie Efira, Albert Dupontel and Nicolas Marié.

The film received twelve nominations at the 46th César Awards, winning in six categories, including Best Film, Best Director and Best Original Screenplay for Dupontel, and Best Supporting Actor for Marié.

== Plot ==
Salon owner Suze Trappet is diagnosed with a terminal autoimmune disease related to her job, and decides to find the child she was forced by her parents to abandon when she was 15 years old. She visits the local authorities to help, who say it must be referred internally. Coincidentally, while she is meeting with M Dupuis at the office, Jean-Baptiste Cuchas, the head of IT for internal affairs, attempts suicide after being dismissed in favour of a younger colleague, ending his video suicide note with the phrase “bye bye morons”. He accidentally fires his shotgun through the wall instead of at himself, hitting M Dupuis and prompting an evacuation of the building.

While JB is incapacitated, Suze, who remained in the building, realises that he works for internal affairs, watches his suicide note and steals the computer containing it. She promises to return it to him, clearing his name, if he will help her find her child. He accompanies her to the archives and meet the archivist Serge Blin, who was blinded by a police shooter in a case of mistaken identity and has a fear of the police as a result. With Serge's help they find an address, but police arrive and arrest JB, while Suze and Serge escape.

Serge guides Suze to the address in the file, where she sees a young man and is overcome with emotion. While she is distracted, a delivery driver hits her car and mistakes Serge for the driver. In fear of arrest, Serge drives off in the car, hitting many vehicles before colliding with the police car transporting JB. With all the passengers except JB incapacitated, he escapes and finds Suze. She returns his computer to him with the suicide note, but instead of turning himself in as intended, JB uses his knowledge of the system and computer skills to locate Dr Lint, the obstetrician who delivered her baby.

Dr Lint now has advanced Alzheimer's and cannot remember anything, but they find his diary, which is in indecipherable handwriting. They take the diary to his wife, who is able to tell them that Dr Lint had arranged for Suze's son to be spared child services and instead arranged for him to be adopted by another, infertile, patient of his. That patient is known in the diary only by a nickname, but Dr Lint has a moment of clarity and comes home, where he is able to remember the name.

JB realises the police are tracking him via his computer as he locates Suze's son, now identified as Adrien. He has a successful career, but JB spots inconsistencies in his lifestyle and realises he is in love with a colleague, Clara. They follow him to his workplace and JB hacks into the office to set up a situation where Adrien and Clara are trapped in a lift together. He broadcasts Suze's voice over the intercom into the lift, where she advises Adrien to disclose his feelings to Clara.

The police arrive on the scene, but Serge distracts them while Suze and JB get away. After arresting Serge, they follow JB and Suze to an empty car park. With armed police threatening JB, Suze takes his gun and walks out towards the police. After a moment, JB joins her and asks to “come with her”. They embrace and kiss, say “bye bye morons”, then Suze raises the gun, prompting the police to gun them down.

Stylised footage of a 15-year-old Suze dancing with the father of her child plays over the start of the credits.

== Cast ==
- Virginie Efira as Suze Trappet
- Albert Dupontel as Jean-Baptiste Cuchas
- Nicolas Marié as Serge Blin
- Jackie Berroyer as Dr. Lint
- Philippe Uchan as M. Kurtzman
- Bastien Ughetto as Adrien
- Marilou Aussilloux as Clara
- Michel Vuillermoz as The Psy
- Laurent Stocker as M. Tuttle
- Kyan Khojandi as Dr. Lint's doctor
- Bouli Lanners as Suze's doctor
- Terry Gilliam as The Hunter

== Release ==
The film was released on October 21, 2020 in France.

== Reception ==
Bye Bye Morons received positive reviews in France. However, Les Inrockuptibles found that, despite the irreverent title, the general message was too consensual and that filming bordered on kitsch. Abroad, The Guardian called it a "frantically misjudged French farce (that) doesn’t travel well'. while Mark Keizer in a review for Variety wrote, "There is another character in “Bye Bye Morons” whose name is a cheeky in-joke. A brief mention of a Francine Weber is a clear tip of the chapeau to French filmmaker Francis Veber (“Le Dîner de Cons,” “The Toy”). Both are beloved French farces, whereas Dupontel’s film, which doesn’t lack for ambition, only focus, fails to live up to the Veber touch or to the dystopian sci-fi classic that has served as its creator’s longtime inspiration."

== Awards and nominations ==
Year	Award	Category	Nominee(s)	Result	Ref.
2021	César Awards	Best Film		Won	
2021	César Awards	Best Director	Albert Dupontel	Won	
2021	César Awards	Best Actress	Virginie Efira	Nominated	
2021	César Awards	Best Actor	Albert Dupontel	Nominated	
2021	César Awards	Best Supporting Actor	Nicolas Mairé	Won	
2021	César Awards	Best Original Screenplay	Albert Dupontel	Won	
2021	César Awards	Best Cinematography	Alexis Kavyrchine	Won	
2021	César Awards	Best Editing	Christophe Pinel	Nominated	
2021	César Awards	Best Costume Design	Mimi Lempicka	Nominated	
2021	César Awards	Best Production Design	Carlos Conti	Won	
2021	César Awards	Best Original Music	Christophe Julien	Nominated	
2021	César Awards	Best Sound	Jean Minondo, Gurwal Coïc-Gallas, Cyril Holtz	Nominated	
2022	Goya Awards	Best European Film		Nominated	
2022	Magritte Awards	Best Actress	Virginie Efira	Nominated	
