= Farewell, Mr. Haffmann =

- Directed by: Fred Cavayé
- Written by: Fred Cavayé; Sarah Kaminsky
- Based on: play by Jean-Philippe Daguerre
- Produced by: Philippe Rousselet
- Starring: Daniel Auteuil; Gilles Lellouche; Sara Giraudeau
- Cinematography: Alain Duplantier
- Edited by: Benjamin Weill
- Music by: Christophe Julien
- Distributed by: Pathé
- Release date: 12 January 2022
- Running time: 116 minutes
- Country: France
- Language: French
- Budget: $12.2 million
- Box office: $6.4 million

Farewell, Mr. Haffmann is a 2022 French historical drama film set during the German occupation of France, in which a jeweller's assistant hides his Jewish boss in his house, causing a dilemma.

== Cast ==
- Daniel Auteuil as Joseph Haffmann
- Gilles Lellouche as François Mercier
- Sara Giraudeau as Blanche Mercier
- Nikolai Kinski as Commandant Jünger
- Mathilde Bisson as Suzanne
- Anne Coesens as Hannah Haffmann
- Claudette Walker as Madame Rosenberg
