= List of 2020 box office number-one films in France =

The following is a list of 2020 box office number-one films in France.

== Number-one films ==
| † | This implies the highest-grossing movie of the year. |

| # | Date | Film | Gross | Notes |
|---|---|---|---|---|
| 1 | January 5, 2020 | Star Wars: The Rise of Skywalker | US$6,638,242 | |
| 2 | January 12, 2020 | Star Wars: The Rise of Skywalker | US$2,209,090 | |
| 3 | January 19, 2020 | 1917 | US$4,142,252 | |
| 4 | January 26, 2020 | Bad Boys for Life | US$4,321,200 | |
| 5 | February 2, 2020 | Bad Boys for Life | US$2,727,259 | |
| 6 | February 9, 2020 | Birds of Prey | US$2,598,574 | |
| 7 | February 16, 2020 | Sonic the Hedgehog | US$4,314,412 | |
| 8 | February 23, 2020 | Sonic the Hedgehog | US$3,736,310 | |
| 9 | March 1, 2020 | The Call of the Wild | US$2,556,752 | |
| 10 | March 8, 2020 | Onward | US$3,854,463 | |
| 11 | March 15, 2020 | How to Be a Good Wife | US$1,329,409 | |
| 12 | March 22, 2020 | French cinemas closed and box office reporting suspended due to the COVID-19 pandemic | | |
| 13 | March 29, 2020 | French cinemas closed and box office reporting suspended due to the COVID-19 pandemic | | |
| 14 | April 5, 2020 | French cinemas closed and box office reporting suspended due to the COVID-19 pandemic | | |
| 15 | April 12, 2020 | French cinemas closed and box office reporting suspended due to the COVID-19 pandemic | | |
| 16 | April 19, 2020 | French cinemas closed and box office reporting suspended due to the COVID-19 pandemic | | |
| 17 | April 26, 2020 | French cinemas closed and box office reporting suspended due to the COVID-19 pandemic | | |
| 18 | May 3, 2020 | French cinemas closed and box office reporting suspended due to the COVID-19 pandemic | | |
| 19 | May 10, 2020 | French cinemas closed and box office reporting suspended due to the COVID-19 pandemic | | |
| 20 | May 17, 2020 | French cinemas closed and box office reporting suspended due to the COVID-19 pandemic | | |
| 21 | May 24, 2020 | French cinemas closed and box office reporting suspended due to the COVID-19 pandemic | | |
| 22 | May 31, 2020 | French cinemas closed and box office reporting suspended due to the COVID-19 pandemic | | |
| 23 | June 7, 2020 | French cinemas closed and box office reporting suspended due to the COVID-19 pandemic | | |
| 24 | June 14, 2020 | French cinemas closed and box office reporting suspended due to the COVID-19 pandemic | | |
| 25 | June 21, 2020 | French cinemas closed and box office reporting suspended due to the COVID-19 pandemic | | |
| 26 | June 28, 2020 | How to Be a Good Wife | US$983,306 | |
| 27 | July 5, 2020 | How to Be a Good Wife | US$781,061 | |
| 28 | July 12, 2020 | Tout simplement noir | US$1,457,218 | |
| 29 | July 19, 2020 | Divorce Club | US$1,632,219 | |
| 30 | July 26, 2020 | Divorce Club | US$783,055 | |
| 31 | August 2, 2020 | Scoob! | US$522,172 | |
| 32 | August 9, 2020 | Les blagues de Toto | US$1,145,459 | |
| 33 | August 16, 2020 | Les blagues de Toto | US$1,603,012 | |
| 34 | August 23, 2020 | Greenland | US$622,000 | |
| 35 | August 30, 2020 | Tenet † | US$6,746,675 | |
| 36 | September 6, 2020 | Tenet † | US$2,853,211 | |
| 37 | September 13, 2020 | Tenet † | US$1,758,151 | |
| 38 | September 20, 2020 | Tenet † | US$1,462,698 | |
| 39 | September 27, 2020 | Antebellum | US$331,904 | |
| 40 | October 4, 2020 | My Cousin | US$1,438,613 | |
| 41 | October 11, 2020 | Parents d'élèves | US$786,540 | |
| 42 | October 18, 2020 | 30 jours max | US$3,056,147 | |
| 43 | October 25, 2020 | Bye Bye Morons | US$3,945,464 | |
| 44 | November 1, 2020 | French cinemas closed and box office reporting suspended due to the COVID-19 pandemic | | |
| 45 | November 8, 2020 | French cinemas closed and box office reporting suspended due to the COVID-19 pandemic | | |
| 46 | November 15, 2020 | French cinemas closed and box office reporting suspended due to the COVID-19 pandemic | | |
| 47 | November 22, 2020 | French cinemas closed and box office reporting suspended due to the COVID-19 pandemic | | |
| 48 | November 29, 2020 | French cinemas closed and box office reporting suspended due to the COVID-19 pandemic | | |
| 49 | December 6, 2020 | French cinemas closed and box office reporting suspended due to the COVID-19 pandemic | | |
| 50 | December 13, 2020 | French cinemas closed and box office reporting suspended due to the COVID-19 pandemic | | |
| 51 | December 20, 2020 | French cinemas closed and box office reporting suspended due to the COVID-19 pandemic | | |
| 52 | December 27, 2020 | French cinemas closed and box office reporting suspended due to the COVID-19 pandemic | | |
