= Rwanda: Le silence des mots =

- Directed by: Gaël Faye
- Written by: Gaël Faye; Michael Sztanke
- Produced by: Babel Doc
- Cinematography: Sébastien Daguerressar
- Edited by: Alexandra Kogan
- Distributed by: Arte
- Release date: 2021
- Running time: 60 minutes
- Country: France
- Language: French

Rwanda: Le silence des mots is a documentary written by Michael Sztank and Gaël Faye directed by Gaël Faye and produced by Babel Doc, release in 2021.

== Synopsis ==
They provided testimonies before the French judiciary, appearing in both Kigali and Paris, initially in 2004 and subsequently in 2012. However, the probe overseen by the 'Genocide and Crimes Against Humanity' division of the Paris High Court has seen little progress since then. Concessa, Jeanne, and Prisca assert allegations of sexual assault perpetrated by French soldiers during Operation Turquoise amidst the 1994 genocide against the Tutsis. Presently, each is navigating their lives while contending with their harrowing past. They serve as advocates, not solely for themselves, but for all women who endured male brutality during that genocide, emblematic figures in the enduring fight against historical oblivion.

== Distinction ==
- 2023: The Grand Public Prize at Justice Documentary Festival Paris
