= Christophe Julien =

21st-century French film music composer

- Born: November 14, 1972 (age 53); Dijon Côte-d'Or, France
- Occupations: film and television music composer
- Years active: 2000s onward
- Era: 21st Century
- Known for: nominations for César Award for Best Original Music at 43rd César Awards (2018) and 46th César Awards (2021)

Christophe Julien is a French composer of film and television music, largely classical, twice-nominated for César Award for best original film music.

== Background ==
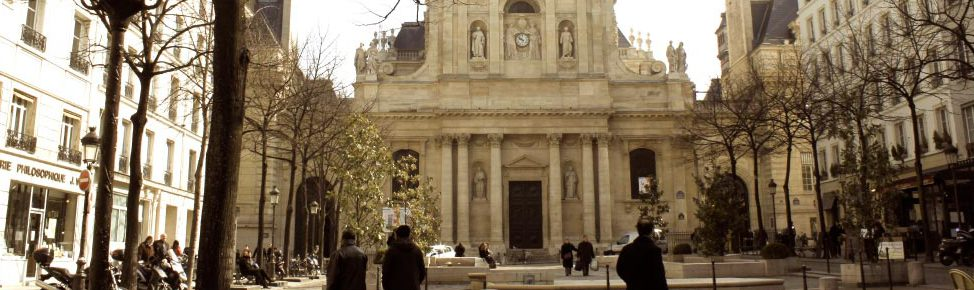
Place de la Sorbonne at the Sorbonne University (28 January 2012)

Christophe Julien was born on November 14, 1972, in Dijon Côte-d'Or, France. At the Conservatoire national supérieur de musique de Paris he studied under guitarist Alexandre Lagoya in harmony, counterpoint, 20th-century music, and chamber music. At the Sorbonne University 1, he studied Indian music and musicology.

== Career ==
Julien's first musical creations were for cinema: short films, documentaries, and commercials. The first commercial success came in 2008 with the comedic Vilaine (film), which began his collaboration with Albert Dupontel on Le Vilain, followed by 9 mois ferme (2013) and Au revoir là-haut (2017, with score nominated for the 43rd César Awards in 2018). He also composed music for Irena Salina's documentary Flow: For Love of Water, which showed at the 2008 Sundance Film Festival. In 2009, he began collaborating with film director Éric Bernard on the adventure film 600 kilos d'or pur. In 2011, he worked with director Emmanuelle Millet on the period piece La Brindille. In 2021, he was nominated twice, first for César Award for Best Original Music at the 46th César Awards for Adieu les cons (Bye Bye Morons) and then for the International Film Music Critics Association Award for Best Original Score for a Comedy Film for Delicieux.

== Work ==
Scores for Film

- 2007:
  - Si c'était lui...
  - J'veux pas que tu t'en ailles
  - Flow: For Love of Water
  - Fragments
  - Manon sur lee bitume
- 2008: Vilaine
- 2009:
  - Téhéran
  - Victor
- 2010: 600 kilograms of pure gold
- 2011:
  - Le Brindille
  - Une folle envie
- 2012: Mes héros
- 2013:
  - 9 Month Stretch
  - Demi-soeur
- 2015:
  - Étourdissement
  - The Sense of Wonder
  - Nos femmes
- 2017:
  - See You Up There
  - Grand Froid
- 2018: Nothing to Hide
- 2019:
  - Espirt de famille
  - Relai
- 2020:
  - Bye Bye Morons
  - Urabá
- 2021:
  - Le Sens de la famille
  - Delicious
- 2022:
  - Canailles
  - Farewell, Mr. Haffmann

Scores for Television

- 2012: Kaboul Kitchen (season 1)
- 2013: Kaboul Kitchen (season 2)
- 2015: Les Pieds dans le tapis
- 2017: Kaboul Kitchen (season 3)
- 2018: Noces rouges
- 2019: Noces d'or

Published Music

- 18 ans après. Concerto pour deux violons en ré maj by Vivaldi, Patrice Fontanarosa, Alexis Galpérine, Joël Pontet, Coline Serreau, and the chamber orchestra of the Conservatoire de Paris, original musics by Coline Serreau, AG and Christophe Julien etc. La bande son Universal 067 738-2
- Symphony N°1 "Au revoir Là haut" (2017)

== Awards ==
- 2016:
  - Luchon Festival: best original music for Les Pieds dans le tapis
  - Lauriers de la radio et de la télévision: best original music for Les Pieds dans le tapis
- 2018:
  - UCMF (French Film Music Association) Award: best original music for Au revoir là-haut
  - Jerry Goldsmith Award: best original music for Au revoir là-haut
  - 43rd César Awards music nominated for Au revoir là-haut
- 2019: Cannes Film Festival: Adami Talents selection for Relai
- 2021:
  - 46th César Awards music nominated for Adieu les cons
  - International Film Music Critics Association Award for Best Original Score for a Comedy Film for Delicieux

== External sources ==
- Official website of Christophe Julien
- Christophe Julien at IMDb
- Unifrance
- Discogs
- MusicBrainz
