= Small Country: An African Childhood =

- Theatrical release poster
- French: Petit Pays
- Directed by: Éric Barbier
- Screenplay by: Éric Barbier
- Based on: Small Country by Gaël Faye
- Produced by: Éric Jehelmann; Philippe Rousselet; Jérôme Salle
- Starring: Jean-Paul Rouve; Isabelle Kabano; Djibril Vancoppenolle; Delya De Medina; Veronika Varga
- Cinematography: Antoine Sanier
- Edited by: Jennifer Augé
- Music by: Renaud Barbier
- Production companies: Jerico Films; Super 8 Production; Pathé Films; France 2 Cinéma; Scope Pictures; Petit Pays Film
- Distributed by: Pathé Distribution
- Release dates: 3 February 2020 (Papeete); 28 August 2020 (France)
- Running time: 111 minutes
- Countries: France; Belgium
- Languages: French, Kirundi and Swahili
- Box office: $2.6 million

Small Country: An African Childhood (French: Petit Pays) is a 2020 film written and directed by Éric Barbier. It is a co-production between France and Belgium. It is an adaptation of Gaël Faye's 2016 novel Small Country. It was theatrically released in France on 28 August 2020.

== Plot ==
The film tells the story of Gabriel, a happy 10 year old living with his French entrepreneur father and Rwandan mother in an expatriate neighborhood in Burundi. As the 1993 tensions in Rwanda starts, his family and innocence is threatened.

== Cast ==
- Jean-Paul Rouve as Michel Chappaz
- Isabelle Kabano as Yvonne
- Djibril Vancoppenolle as Gaby Chappaz
- Delya De Medina as Ana Chappaz
- Veronika Varga as Madame Economopoulos
- Tao Monladja as Gino
- Ruben Ruhanamilindi as Armand
- Brian Gakwavu as Lucien
- Kenny Hubbawiwe as Paul
- Nelson Membe as Francis

== Awards ==
- César Awards 2021, Nominee: Best Adapted Screenplay
- Lumière Awards 2021, Nominee: Best Male Revelation
- Barcelona International Short Film Festival: Best movie and actress awards

== Festivals ==
- 25th Alliance Française French Film Festival
- Chicago International Film Festival
- Italian Contemporary Film Festival
- Fribourg International Film Festival 2020
