= Adolescents (film) =

2019 documentary film

- Theatrical release poster
- French: Adolescentes
- Directed by: Sébastien Lifshitz
- Produced by: Muriel Meynard
- Starring: Anaïs Chambaudie; Emma Jaubert
- Cinematography: Paul Guilhaume; Antoine Parouty
- Edited by: Tina Baz
- Music by: Tindersticks
- Production companies: Agat Films & Cie; Arte France Cinéma; Les Productions Chaocorp
- Distributed by: Ad Vitam
- Release dates: 9 August 2019 (Locarno); 9 September 2020 (France)
- Running time: 135 minutes
- Country: France
- Language: French
- Box office: $751,655

Adolescents (French: Adolescentes) is a 2019 French documentary directed by Sébastien Lifshitz. It was theatrically released in France by Ad Vitam on 9 September 2020. The film received the Louis Delluc Prize for 2020 and was awarded Best Documentary Film, Best Sound and Best Editing at the 46th César Awards.

== Synopsis ==
In Brive-la-Gaillarde, Emma and Anaïs, best friends from different social classes, struggle to stay connected as they become teenagers and it seems like the world is pulling them apart.

== Production ==
Adolescents was produced by Muriel Meynard at Agat Films & Cie in co-production with Arte France Cinéma and Les Productions Chaocorp.

== Release ==
Adolescents had its world premiere in the Critics' Week section at the 72nd Locarno Film Festival on 9 August 2019. The film was later screened on 16 October 2019 at the Festival International du Film Indépendant de Bordeaux. Postponed due to the COVID-19 pandemic, the film was theatrically released in France by Ad Vitam on 9 September 2020.

== Reception ==
=== Critical response ===
Adolescents received an average rating of 4.2 out of 5 stars on the French website AlloCiné, based on 32 reviews.

=== Accolades ===
Award	Date of ceremony	Category	Recipient(s)	Result	Ref.
César Awards	12 March 2021	Best Documentary Film	Adolescents	Won	
César Awards	12 March 2021	Best Sound	Yolande Decarsin, Jeanne Delplancq, Olivier Goinard, and Fanny Martin	Won	
César Awards	12 March 2021	Best Editing	Tina Baz	Won	
César Awards	12 March 2021	Best Film	Adolescents	Nominated	
César Awards	12 March 2021	Best Director	Sébastien Lifshitz	Nominated	
César Awards	12 March 2021	Best Cinematography	Antoine Parouty and Paul Guilhaume	Nominated	
Louis Delluc Prize	26 January 2021	Best Film	Adolescents	Won	
