= Shimon Finkel =

Israeli actor and director (1905–1999)

- שמעון פינקל
- Finkel (right) on stage with Miriam Zohar in 1953
- Born: 1 December 1905; Grodno, Russian Empire
- Died: 5 October 1999 (aged 93); Tel Aviv, Israel
- Known for: Actor; theatre director; theatre producer; author
- Awards: Israel Prize

Shimon Finkel (Hebrew: שמעון פינקל; 1 December 1905 – 5 October 1999) was an Israeli stage and film actor, theatre director, and one of the founding figures of modern Hebrew theatre. A leading member and later artistic director of the Habima Theatre, Finkel was known for his powerful performances, especially in classical and Hebrew-language roles. In 1969, he was awarded the Israel Prize for his contribution to theatre.

== Early life and education ==
Shimon Finkel was born in Grodno, then part of the Russian Empire (today in Belarus). He became interested in performing at a young age and began acting in Yiddish theater during his teenage years. After World War I, he was active in Jewish cultural movements and participated in amateur theater circles. In 1922 Finkel studied acting in Berlin under the director, Max Reinhardt. His first appearance in Hebrew was as Daniel in Menahem Gnessin's production of Belshazzar in Berlin in 1924.

In 1924, at the age of 19, he immigrated to Eretz Yisrael where he joined the Hebrew Stage Studio and became one of the early performers in the emerging Hebrew-language theater.

== Theatrical career ==
=== Habima Theatre ===
In 1927, Finkel joined the Habima Theatre, which was in the process of transitioning from Moscow to Tel Aviv. His first role was in its production of An-sky's The Dybbuk. Over the next several decades, he became one of its most distinguished actors, known for his versatility in both classical and modern roles. Often referred to as the first Hebrew-speaking “Hamlet”, his pioneering work helped establish Hebrew as a language of on stage. His long career at Habima helped define the aesthetic and cultural direction of Israeli theater during its formative decades.

He played leading roles in works by Shakespeare (King Lear, Othello), Sophocles, and Molière, as well as Peer Gynt, and The Diary of Anne Frank. He also acted in modern Hebrew plays by Nissim Aloni, Leah Goldberg, and Yehoshua Sobol.

Finkel was widely praised for his deep command of the Hebrew language and his theatrical presence. He is remembered through continued performances of plays he championed, scholarly work on Hebrew theater, and the many actors he influenced.

=== Broadway Theatre ===
Finkel played several roles in Broadway plays, including David's Crown (Broadway Theatre, 1948), The Golem (Broadway Theatre, 1948) and Oedipus Rex (Broadway Theatre, 1948) and Rabbi Azriel in the Dybbuk (Little Theatre, opened 1964).

=== Directorial work ===
Finkel served twice as artistic director of Habima, first in the early 1960s, and again from 1970 to 1975. He was instrumental in shaping the company's artistic vision and introducing new repertory to Israeli audiences. Among the plays he directed were Ghosts, In the Negev Plains, The Father, and many more.

== Film and other work ==
In addition to his stage work, Finkel appeared in several Israeli films and radio plays. Although primarily a stage actor, his contributions to Israeli cinema and public broadcasting left a lasting legacy.

He was known for mentoring younger actors and remained active in the theater community well into his eighties.

=== Best known films ===
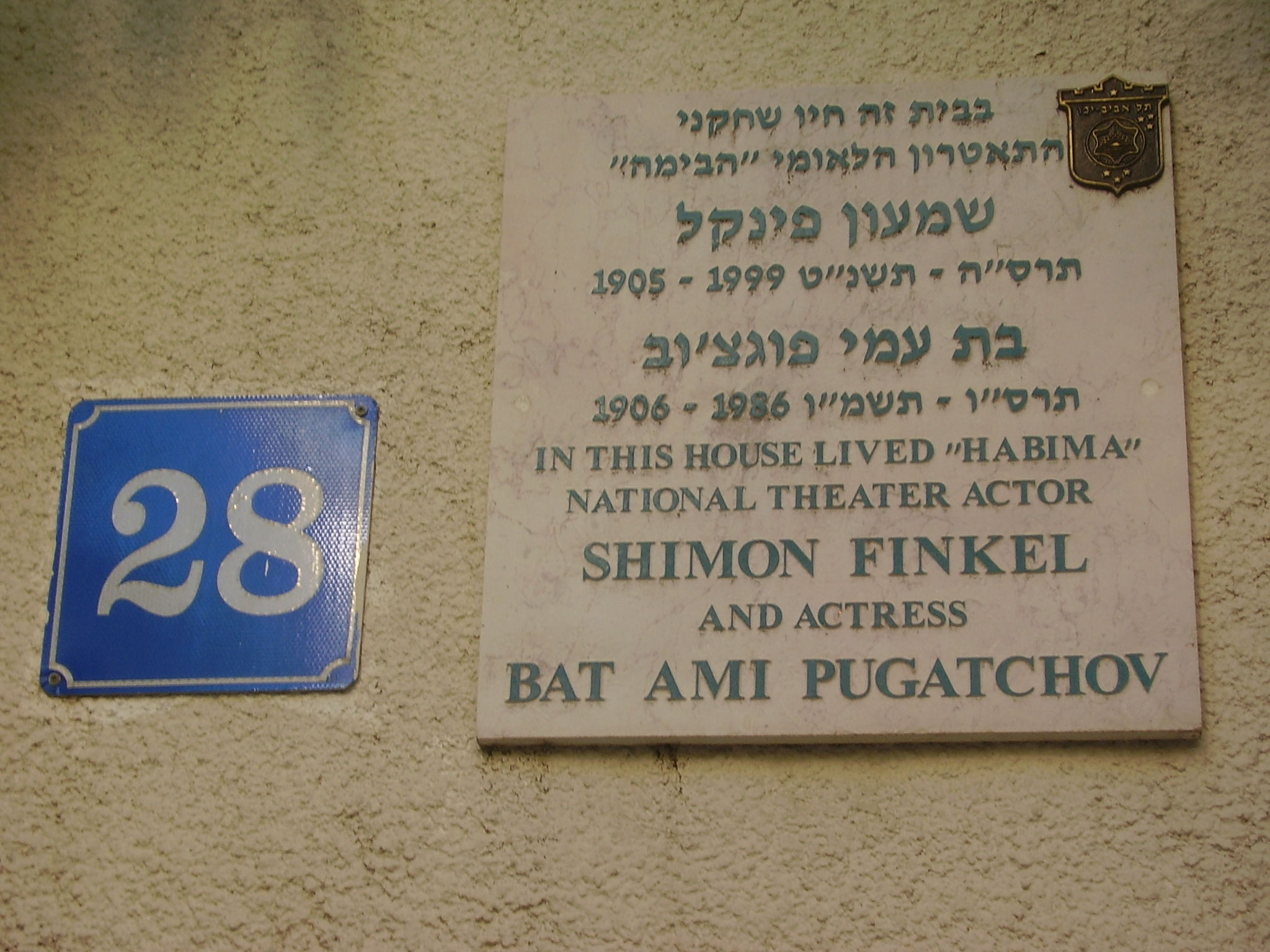
- Memorial plaque at Finkel-Pugatchov house in Tel Aviv
  Pioneers of Palestine (aka Sabra 1932)
- Oded Hanoded (‘Oded the wanderer’) (1932)
- El Dorado (1963)
- The Winchell Affair (1979)
- The Vulture (1981)
- Hanna's War (1988)

== Books ==
He wrote eleven books about the theatre in Hebrew. Among them:

- Bimah ve-Kela'im: Hayei Shahakan u-Me'avako Le-atzmuto/ On Stage and Backstage: autobiography of an actor.(1968)
- Bi-mevokh tafkidai: hav'ayot mi-sadnat ha-bamah/ In the Maze of my Theatrical Roles (1971)
- Gilgulim: leket mi-'Nof ha-kerashim'/ Metamorphosis: A View from the Boards (1977)
- Aharon Meskin v'eagadat Hagolem: Perakim Lezichro/ Aharon Meskin and Legends of the Golem (1980)
- Sofmischak/ End of Acting (1984)
- Nitzozot/ Sparks (1985)

== Awards and recognition ==
- Israel Prize for Theater (1969) – one of Israel's highest honors, awarded for lifetime achievement in the arts.
- Meir Margalit Life Achievement Award (1985)
- Honorary Doctorate from Hebrew University (1992)
- Lifetime achievement award by Israel Theatre (1996)

=== Shimon Finkel Prize ===
After his death Habima established the Shimon Finkel prize. Among the artists who have received the award are: Yoni Rechter for his work both on "King Solomon" and "The 16th Sheep" (2006), to Tamir Grinberg who wrote Hebron. (2010) to composer Ori Widislawski for his music to Velocity, Fatal Attraction and The Good Son (2015)

== Personal life and death ==
Finkel lived most of his life in Tel Aviv. He died on 5 October 1999, at the age of 93. He is buried at Kiryat Shaul Cemetery in Tel Aviv.

== See also ==
- Habima Theatre
- Theatre in Israel
- Israel Prize
