= International Film Music Critics Association Award for Best Original Score for a Comedy Film =

International fim music award

The International Film Music Critics Association Award for Best Original Score for a Comedy Film is an annual award given by the International Film Music Critics Association, or the IFMCA. The award is given to the composer of a film score for a comedy film deemed to be the best in a given year. The award was first given in 1998, before going a six-year hiatus. It has been awards every year since 2004.

== Winners and nominations ==
=== 1990s ===
Year	Film	Composer(s)
1998	A Bug's Life	Randy Newman
1998	Antz	Harry Gregson-Williams and John Powell
1998	The Parent Trap	Alan Silvestri
1998	Paulie	John Debney
1998	Six Days, Seven Nights	Randy Edelman

=== 2000s ===
Year	Film	Composer(s)
2004	The Terminal	John Williams
2004	Lemony Snicket's A Series of Unfortunate Events	Thomas Newman
2004	Shrek 2	Harry Gregson-Williams
2004	Sideways	Rolfe Kent
2004	Team America: World Police	Harry Gregson-Williams
2005	Wallace & Gromit: The Curse of the Were-Rabbit	Julian Nott
2005	Corpse Bride	Danny Elfman
2005	Mr. & Mrs. Smith	John Powell
2005	Racing Stripes	Mark Isham
2005	Robots	John Powell
2006	The Holiday	Hans Zimmer
2006	Little Miss Sunshine	Mychael Danna
2006	Miss Potter	Nigel Westlake and Rachel Portman
2006	The Pink Panther	Christophe Beck
2006	The Shaggy Dog	Alan Menken
2007	Enchanted	Alan Menken
2007	Evan Almighty	John Debney
2007	Hot Fuzz	David Arnold
2007	Reign Over Me	Rolfe Kent
2007	Tutte le donne della mia vita	Ennio Morricone
2008	Burn After Reading	Carter Burwell
2008	Fool's Gold	George Fenton
2008	Leatherheads	Randy Newman
2008	Tropic Thunder	Theodore Shapiro
2008	Welcome to the Sticks	Philippe Rombi
2009	The Informant!	Marvin Hamlisch
2009	Couples Retreat	A. R. Rahman
2009	Duplicity	James Newton Howard
2009	Julie & Julia	Alexandre Desplat
2009	Lesbian Vampire Killers	Debbie Wiseman

=== 2010s ===
Year	Film	Composer(s)
2010	The Lightkeepers	Pinar Toprak
2010	Lo	Scott Glasgow
2010	Nanny McPhee Returns	James Newton Howard
2010	Potiche	Philippe Rombi
2010	Vampires Suck	Christopher Lennertz
2011	The Rum Diary	Christopher Young
2011	Paul	David Arnold
2011	Torrente 4: Lethal Crisis	Roque Baños
2011	A Very Harold & Kumar 3D Christmas	William Ross
2011	Your Highness	Steve Jablonsky
2012	Ted	Walter Murphy
2012	Moonrise Kingdom	Alexandre Desplat
2012	Salmon Fishing in the Yemen	Dario Marianelli
2012	The Sessions	Marco Beltrami
2012	Silver Linings Playbook	Danny Elfman
2013	The Secret Life of Walter Mitty	Theodore Shapiro
2013	The French Minister	Philippe Sarde
2013	Instructions Not Included	Carlo Siliotto
2013	This Is the End	Henry Jackman
2013	Venus in Fur	Alexandre Desplat
2014	The Grand Budapest Hotel	Alexandre Desplat
2014	Cantinflas	Roque Baños
2014	A Million Ways to Die in the West	Joel McNeely
2014	Night at the Museum: Secret of the Tomb	Alan Silvestri
2014	Wishin' and Hopin'	Matthew Llewellyn
2015	Krampus	Douglas Pipes
2015	The Lady in the Van	George Fenton
2015	The Price of Fame	Michel Legrand
2015	The Second Best Exotic Marigold Hotel	Thomas Newman
2015	Spy	Theodore Shapiro
2016	La La Land	Justin Hurwitz
2016	Eddie the Eagle	Matthew Margeson
2016	Hail, Caesar!	Carter Burwell
2016	The Nice Guys	John Ottman and David Buckley
2016	Swiss Army Man	Andy Hull and Robert McDowell
2017	The Death of Stalin	Christopher Willis
2017	Downsizing	Rolfe Kent
2017	Knock	Cyrille Aufort
2017	Paddington 2	Dario Marianelli
2017	Their Finest	Rachel Portman
2018	Mary Poppins Returns	Marc Shaiman
2018	Christopher Robin	Geoff Zanelli and Jon Brion
2018	Crazy Rich Asians	Brian Tyler
2018	The Sisters Brothers	Alexandre Desplat
2018	Videoman	Robert Parker and Waveshaper
2019	Jojo Rabbit	Michael Giacchino
2019	Dolemite Is My Name	Scott Bomar
2019	The Mystery of Henri Pick	Laurent Perez Del Mar
2019	Swoon	Nathaniel Méchaly
2019	White As Snow	Bruno Coulais

=== 2020s ===
Year	Film	Composer(s)
2020	The Personal History of David Copperfield	Christopher Willis
2020	An American Pickle	Michael Giacchino and Nami Melumad
2020	Emma.	Isobel Waller-Bridge and David Schweitzer
2020	Godmothered	Rachel Portman
2020	Wild Mountain Thyme	Amelia Warner
2021	Cruella	Nicholas Britell
2021	Delicieux	Christophe Julien
2021	Don't Look Up	Nicholas Britell
2021	The French Dispatch	Alexandre Desplat
2021	Peruna	Panu Aaltio
