= Robert Zimmermann Is Tangled Up in Love =

- Directed by: Leander Haußmann
- Starring: Tom Schilling, Maruschka Detmers
- Release date: 28 August 2008
- Running time: 1h 42min
- Country: Germany
- Language: German

Robert Zimmermann Is Tangled Up in Love (German: Robert Zimmermann wundert sich über die Liebe) is a 2008 German romantic comedy film directed by Leander Haußmann.

The film stars Tom Schilling as a 26-year-old video game designer named Robert Zimmerman who shares Bob Dylan's birth name. Young Zimmerman falls in love with an older woman (Maruschka Detmers) – 20 years his senior – who works in a laundromat. James Garfunkel, son of Art Garfunkel, appears in the film.

The soundtrack was by the Berlin band Element of Crime, who were nominated for a German Film Award for best film music in 2009.

== Cast ==
- Tom Schilling - Robert Zimmermann
- Maruschka Detmers - Monika
- Christian Sengewald - Ole
- Julia Dietze - Lorna
- James Garfunkel - himself
- Kirstin Hesse - Anka
- Annika Kuhl - Pia Zimmermann
- Detlev Buck - Eberhard
- Peter Jordan - Karsten Darkness
- Leander Haußmann - Ronny
- Bernd. P. Schröder - Bartender
