= Hanna's War =

1988 film by Menahem Golan

- VHS cover
- Directed by: Menahem Golan
- Screenplay by: Menahem Golan; Stanley Mann
- Based on: The Diaries Of Hanna Senesh and A Great Wind Cometh by Yoel Palgi
- Produced by: Yoram Globus; Menahem Golan
- Starring: Ellen Burstyn; Maruschka Detmers; Anthony Andrews; Donald Pleasence; David Warner
- Cinematography: Elemér Ragályi
- Edited by: Alain Jakubowicz; Dory Lubliner
- Music by: Dov Seltzer
- Production company: Golan-Globus Productions
- Distributed by: Cannon Films
- Release date: 23 November 1988
- Running time: 148 minutes
- Country: United States
- Languages: English; Hungarian
- Budget: $7 million
- Box office: $139,796 (USA)

Hanna's War is a 1988 war film co-written and directed by Menahem Golan. The film is based on The Diaries of Hanna Senesh and the biographical novel A Great Wind Cometh by Yoel Palgi. It is a biopic detailing the true story of Hannah Szenes.

== Plot ==
Hannah Senesh was a Hungarian schoolgirl with poetic aspirations. In the face of rising anti-Semitic tensions in Budapest, Hanna leaves her mother Katalin and family behind to work on a kibbutz in British Mandated Palestine. There she is recruited by the Royal Air Force (RAF) for a dangerous mission: The RAF will train volunteers and parachute them over their native lands if they agree to help downed fliers escape from enemy territory. Realising it could be a suicide mission, Hanna accepts the assignment because she feels her family, still alive in Budapest, may soon be taken to the death camps by the Nazis. During her mission, Hanna is captured by the Nazis and ultimately undergoes a long, torturous interrogation process overseen by Captain Thomas Rosza. Her courage and indomitable will in the face of torture, fear and death will make her an inspiration to the Allies and the world.

== Principal cast ==
Actor	Role
Ellen Burstyn	Katalin
Maruschka Detmers	Hanna
Anthony Andrews	McCormack
Donald Pleasence	Captain Thomas Rosza
David Warner	Captain Julian Simon
Vincent Riotta	Yoel
Avi Korein	Eliyahu Golomb
Ingrid Pitt	Margit
John Stride	Dr. Komoly
Shimon Finkel	David Ben-Gurion

== Production ==
The film was shot on location in Israel and Hungary. Early in development, Helena Bonham Carter was cast as Hanna with Peter Weir signing on as director. Due to delays in filming, Carter and Weir dropped out.

== Critical reception ==
Hanna's War received mixed reviews.

The Los Angeles Times gave the film a negative review, criticising Ellen Burstyn's casting as she bore no resemblance to her on-screen daughter, rather than her performance. Another negative review came from Time Out who said, "The bad script is based on a stale polemic, which produces an expensive and self-righteous piece of propaganda."

Variety was more positive, saying, "Menahem Golan’s version, heroes and villains are easily distinguished, characters are respectfully observed and admired, or duly abhorred and discredited, and no time is spent dwelling on psychological niceties."

Walter Goodman of The New York Times praised the supporting performances of Donald Pleasence and David Warner but was critical of Anthony Andrews, "The villains provide what zest there is: Donald Pleasence, doing his nutty number as a sadist with a soft streak (I love a young girl's fingernails. Yours were so pretty.) and David Warner as the Uriah Heep of Hungarian Fascists (This will be the last time you will see one another - and I mean the last time). Anthony Andrews, playing a tough Scottish officer and gentleman, has the good luck to be eliminated fairly early.

== Availability on home media ==
Although the film has not been released on DVD, the VHS version is available for sale at sites such as Amazon.com.
