= Aloys Ntiwiragabo =

Head of Rwanda army intelligence

Aloys Ntiwiragabo (born 1948), was the head of Rwanda army intelligence from 1993 to 1994 during the Rwandan genocide. Ntiwiragabo was identified by the International Criminal Tribunal for Rwanda to be part of genocide and is one of two among the 11 cited by the tribunal who has not been arrested yet.

Following revelation of presence of Aloys Ntiwiragabo in France, French prosecutors have opened an investigation for crimes against humanity in 2020 against him and Rwanda emitted an international arrest warrant on December 21, 2021. Interpol opened a red notice against him for crime against humanity and genocide.

In January 2023, a complaint and file by Aloys Ntiwiragabo against journalist Maria Malagardis for "public insults"..

== See also ==
- Akazu
