= Pitchipoi =

Pitchipoi is a place where displaced Jews in France imagined they would be deported to while they were interned in the Drancy internment camp awaiting transport to Auschwitz.

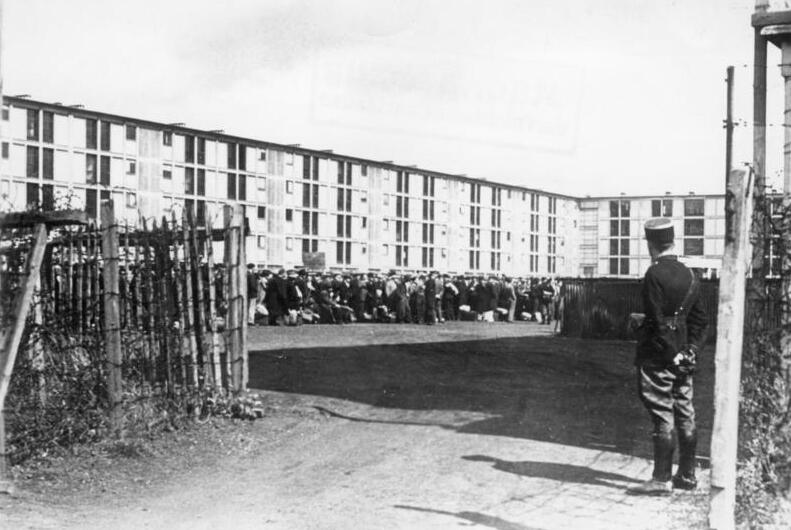
View of the accommodation block at Drancy internment camp with French gendarme on guard

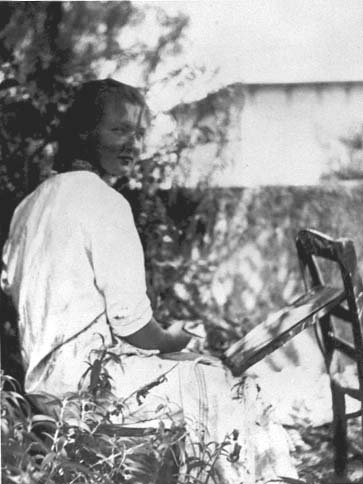
Charlotte Salomon painting in her garden about 1939

In her biography of the painter Charlotte Salomon, who was transported from Drancy to Auschwitz in September 1943, Mary Felstiner quotes from the testimony of Holocaust survivors the following points:

For some, Pitchipoi was the nonsense name of a Polish ghetto, a Yiddish name used by Polish Jews; for some, the word "resonated like an eternal curse"; for others, "Pitchipoi was a place of compulsory forced labor".

It was Nazi policy to keep Jewish prisoners in a state of ignorance about their final destination, so Pitchipoi was invented to fill this vacuum in their knowledge. Most prisoners were murdered on arrival at the death camps organised by the Germans.
