= How to Be a Good Wife =

2020 film by Martin Provost

- Film poster
- French: La bonne épouse
- Directed by: Martin Provost
- Written by: Martin Provost; Séverine Werba
- Produced by: François Kraus; Denis Pineau-Valencienne
- Starring: Juliette Binoche; Yolande Moreau; Noémie Lvovsky; Edouard Baer; François Berléand
- Cinematography: Guillaume Schiffman
- Edited by: Albertine Lastera
- Music by: Grégoire Hetzel
- Production company: Les Films du Kiosque
- Distributed by: Memento Films Distribution
- Release date: 11 March 2020
- Running time: 108 minutes
- Country: France
- Language: French
- Box office: $6 million

How to Be a Good Wife (French: La bonne épouse) is a French comedy-drama film directed by Martin Provost. The film begins in 1967 in Alsace, France at a school made for good housekeeping, and stars Juliette Binoche as Paulette Van der Beck, a housewife who unexpectedly has to take over leadership of the school after the death of her husband.

== Plot ==
Set on the historical background of the 1968 student riots in Paris, the plot is located in Van der Beck's School of Housekeeping and Good Manners in Alsace, in one of the many schools meant for young women in France of that time, to teach them housekeeping, good manners, and, generally, how to be a good wife to a man.

In the beginning of the school year, in late 1967, Paulette, the school headmistress and the other school staff, including her husband Robert, Robert's sister Gilberte and the school nun-teacher Marie-Therese check out the women coming to their school that year, and they notice that one of the women they will teach that year is red-headed, and they wonder if that will mean the year will be jinxed.

In one of the dinners, a rabbit dish cooked earlier that day by the girls is served. Robert chokes on a rabbit bone and dies. After Robert, who was in charge of the school finances, dies, his wife Paulette and the staff go through his belongings. Among these, they find letters which show that the place is on the brink of bankruptcy.

Paulette and Gilberte go to speak to the bank manager to ask for a loan to save the school. The bank manager, André Grunvald, tells them that Robert borrowed too much already; however, he suggests to Paulette that she transfer the school to her name, and get another loan. After the meeting, Gilberte leaves the meeting, and Paulette tries to leave too, when Grunvald grabs her by the hand, and asks to meet her. Paulette refuses and leaves the room.

Later, when she is back in school, Paulette receives a phone call from Grunvald, who tells her to meet him in 15 minutes. Paulette sneaks out of the school and meets Grunvald. Apparently, they were lovers before Grunvald went to the war. After the war, Paulette's mother died of heartache after hearing that her husband, Paulette's father, was sent to the camps and died there. Paulette left her home after the war and found a job in Van der Beck's School of Housekeeping and Good Manners, so Grunvald's letters never reached her. The school manager, Robert, fell in love with her and the two married. In the meantime, Grunvald had two kids but his wife has died. He ask Paulette to get back together with him again. Paulette hasn't decided yet.

Back in school, one of the young women receives news that she is to marry a man the age of her father. She attempts suicide, but is saved in the last minute by the other young women who discovers her hanging on a noose. After the suicide attempt, Paulette lies in bed, despairing that everything the school stands for is wrong as it subjugates women. She is meant to go with the young women to a housekeeping fair in Paris meant for young women. Initially Paulette considers cancelling the trip to Paris, but finally agrees to take the women to Paris.

Grunvald comes to the school and wants to be with her and climbs on the piping to her bedroom. Paulette only lets him off the pipe and into her bedroom after making him promise that he will do the cooking in their household, and making him give the details of an apple strudel before letting him into her room. They have sex in her room, and then Paulette joins the bus with the young women and the staff, for the trip to Paris.

During the bus trip, they hear on the radio that students riots shut down Paris. As they approach the outskirts of Paris, the roads are blocked in a huge traffic jam. Paulette refuses to go back to the school; instead, she and the young women get out of the bus, singing, marching towards Paris to join the women's liberation revolution taking place there.

== Cast ==
- Juliette Binoche : Paulette Van der Beck
- Yolande Moreau : Gilberte Van der Beck
- Noémie Lvovsky : Marie-Thérèse
- Edouard Baer : André Grunvald
- François Berléand : Robert Van der Beck
- Marie Zabukovec : Annie Fuchs
- Anamaria Vartolomei : Albane Des-deux-Ponts
- Lily Taieb : Yvette Ziegler
- Pauline Briand : Corinne Schwartz
- Armelle : Christiane Rougemont

== Release ==
How to Be a Good Wife opened in France on 11 March 2020. On its opening weekend in France, the film grossed a total of $1,329,409 making it the highest-grossing film in France that weekend.

== Reception ==
Jonathan Romney of Screen Daily referred to the film as "a breezy, well-intentioned but ultimately laborious comic vehicle for Juliette Binoche" and step away from the "such serious-minded female portraits as 2008’s César-garlanded artist biopic Séraphine and 2013’s sombre Violette concluding that the film "has its heart and mind in the right place when it comes to the 1960s archeology of patriarchy, French-style. But tonal unevenness – awkwardly balancing goofy farce, heavy-handed social satire, and earnest emotional directness – makes for a flimsy misfire."

== See also ==
- List of 2020 box office number-one films in France
