= Gaël Faye =

Rwandan–French singer, rapper, and writer (born 1982)

Faye at Politics and Prose bookstore in 2026

Gaël Faye (French pronunciation: [ɡaɛl faj]; born 6 August 1982) is a Rwandan–French singer, songwriter, rapper, and writer.

== Personal life ==
Faye was born in Bujumbura, Burundi, of a French father and Rwandan mother. He moved to France at the age of 13, escaping from the Burundian civil war. He studied commerce and later received a master's degree in finance.

He is married and has two daughters. His mother in law is Rwandan Dafroza Gauthier.

== Books ==
Faye wrote a novel inspired by his teenage-years' experience of the war in Burundi. Small Country (Petit Pays) was first published in France in August 2016 by Grasset. It won five literary prizes, including the Prix Goncourt des Lycéens. It has been translated into 36 languages and made into a movie, released in 2020. In August 2024, Faye's second novel, Jacaranda, published, also by Grasset, won the Prix Renaudot.

== Music ==
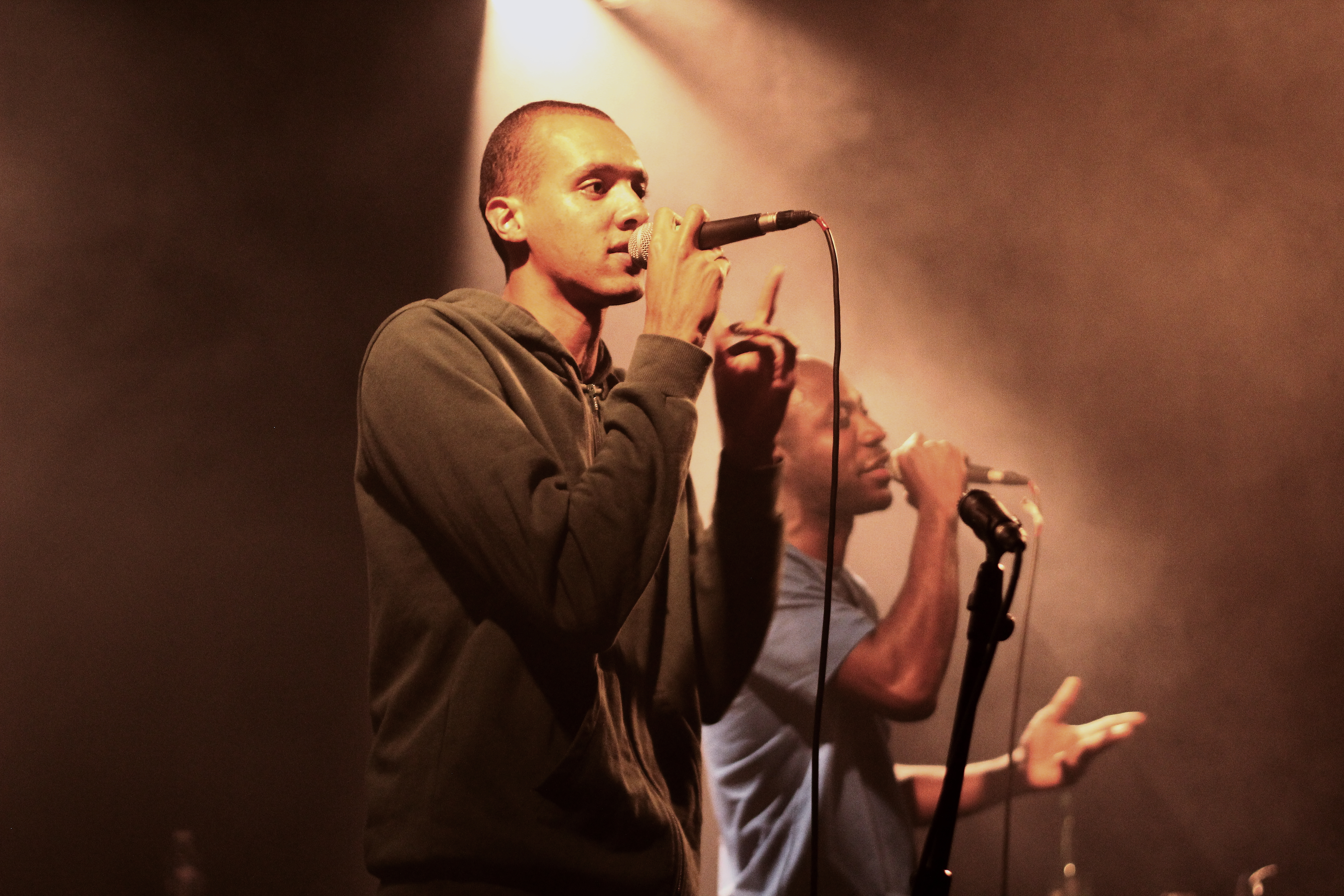
Gaël Faye (Milk Coffee and Sugar) in September 2014

In 2010, Faye and Edgar Sekloka released a rap and hip-hop album entitled Milk Coffee and Sugar (also the name of their group).

Faye then released three solo albums and one EP: Pili Pili sur un Croissant au Beurre (2013), Des fleurs EP (2014). Lundi Méchant (2020) and Mauve Jacaranda (2022). Lundi Méchant went gold in 2022.

== Bibliography ==
- Petit Pays, Grasset, 2016. ISBN 9782246857341
  - Small Country, Hogarth, 2016. ISBN 9782246857334
- Jacaranda, Grasset, 2024. ISBN 9782246831457
  - Jacaranda, Hogarth, 2026. ISBN 9780593979617

== Film ==
Year	Title	Role	Notes	Ref.
2022	Rwanda: Words of Silence		Wrote and directed	
2024	Savages	MC Orangutan	Voice role	

== Awards ==
- 2016: Prix du roman Fnac for Petit Pays
- 2016: Prix du Premier Roman for Petit Pays
- 2016: Prix Goncourt des Lycéens for Petit Pays
- 2016: Prix France Culture/Télérama for Petit Pays
- 2023: The Grand Public Prize at Justice Documentary Festival Paris
- 2024: Prix Renaudot for Jacaranda
