= Éric Barbier =

French film director and screenwriter

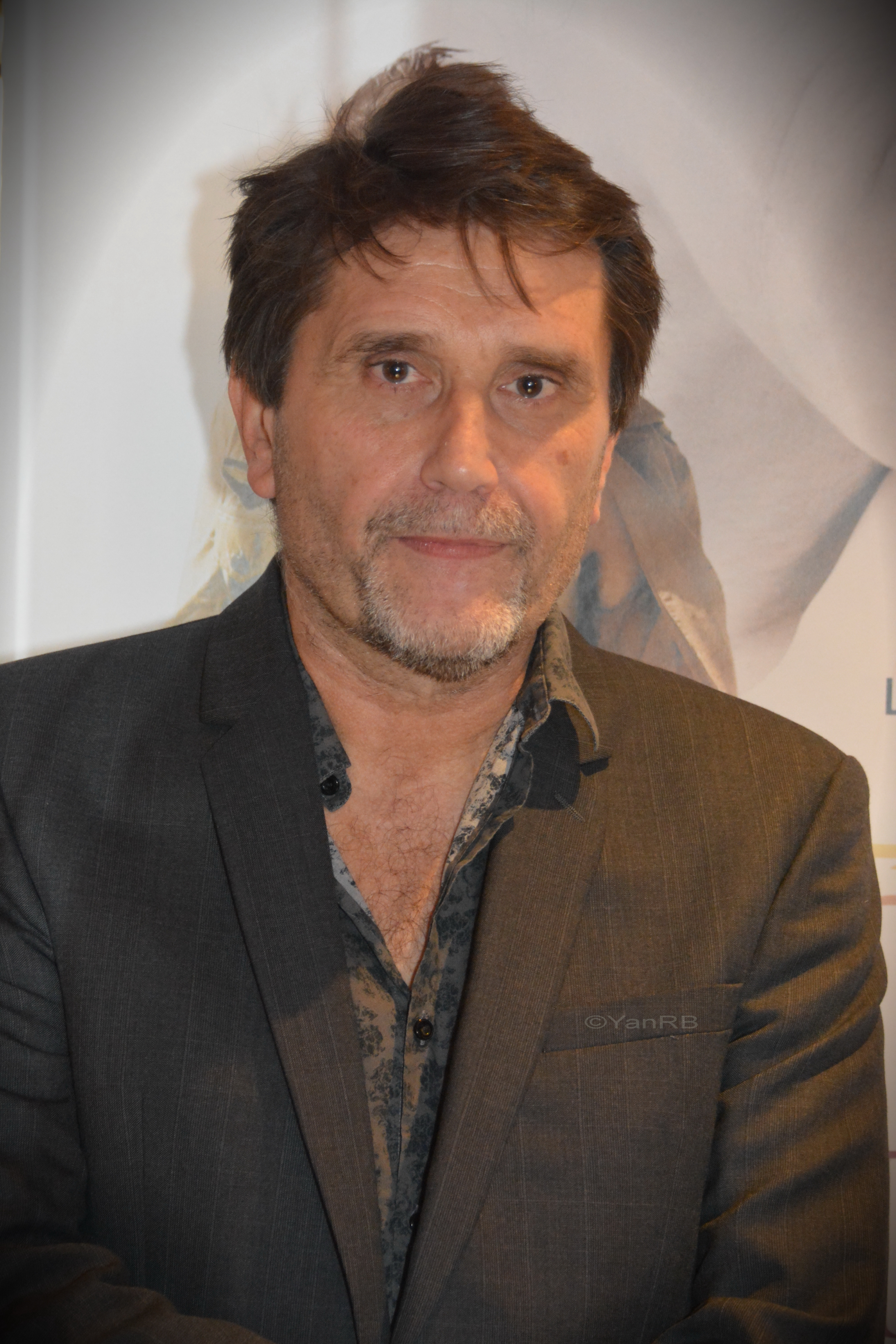
- Barbier in 2017
- Born: 29 June 1960 (age 64); Aix-en-Provence, France
- Occupations: Film director; screenwriter

Éric Barbier (born 29 June 1960 in Aix-en-Provence) is a French film director and screenwriter.

== Filmography ==
Year	Title	Director	Screenwriter	Notes
1991	Le Brasier	Yes	Yes	
1993	Un air de liberté	Yes	Yes	Television film
2000	Toreros	Yes	Yes	
2006	The Serpent	Yes	Yes	
2014	Le Dernier Diamant	Yes	Yes	
2017	Prise de court	No	Yes	
2017	Promise at Dawn	Yes	Yes	
2020	Small Country: An African Childhood	Yes	Yes	
2023	Zodi et Téhu, frères du désert	Yes	Yes	

=== Actor ===
- 1994: Le Péril jeune by Cédric Klapisch

== Awards and nominations ==
Year	Award	Category	Film	Result	Ref.
1991	Prix Jean Vigo		Le Brasier	Won	
2018	César Awards	Best Adaptation (Shared with Marie Eynard)	Promise at Dawn	Nominated	
2021	César Awards	Best Adaptation	Small Country: An African Childhood	Nominated	

== Bibliography ==
- Bastide, Bernard; Durand, Jacques-Olivier (1999). "Barbier, Éric". Dictionnaire du cinéma dans le Gard. Montpellier: Les Presses du Languedoc. pp. 24–25. ISBN 2-85998-215-9.
