= Pascal Judelewicz =

French film producer

Pascal Judelewicz is a French film producer, actor and President of Acajou Films.

== Filmography ==
=== As a film producer ===
- Monsieur (dir. Jean-Philippe Toussaint, 1990).
- La sévillane (dir. Jean-Philippe Toussaint, 1992).
- Mina Tannenbaum (executive producer, dir. Martine Dugowson, 1994).
- La partie d'échecs (dir. Yves Hanchar, 1994).
- The Liars (dir. Élie Chouraqui, 1996).
- Lucky Punch (dir. Dominique Ladoge, 1996).
- Mordbüro (dir. Lionel Kopp, 1997).
- Le secret de Polichinelle (co-producer, dir. Franck Landron, 1997).
- An Air So Pure (co-producer, dir. Yves Angelo, 1997).
- Marie Baie des Anges (executive producer, dir. Manuel Pradal, 1997).
- Place Vendôme (dir. Nicole Garcia, 1998).
- The Ice Rink (dir. Jean-Philippe Toussaint, 1998).
- Les menteurs (dir. Laurent Firode, 1999).
- Mon père, ma mère, mes frères et mes sœurs... (dir. Charlotte de Turckheim, 1999).
- Uppercut (short film, dir. Patrice Jourdan, Sören Prévost, 2000).
- Toreros (dir. Éric Barbier, 2000).
- Everybody's Famous! (co-producer, dir. Dominique Deruddere, 2000).
- En vacances (dir. Yves Hanchar, 2000).
- Happenstance (dir. Laurent Firode, 2000).
- Slogans (dir. Gjergj Xhuvani, 2001).
- Raisons économiques (shor film, dir. Patrice Jourdan, Sören Prévost, 2002).
- Ginostra (executive producer, dir. Manuel Pradal, 2002).
- I dashur armik (dir. Gjergj Xhuvani, 2004).
- La méthode Bourchnikov (short film, dir. Grégoire Sivan, 2004).
- Tideline (Littoral) (co-producer, dir. Wajdi Mouawad, 2004).
- Beyond the Ocean (dir. Éliane de Latour, 2006).
- Gravida (dir. Alain Robbe-Grillet, 2006).
- Saviors in the Night (co-producer, dir. Ludi Boeken, 2009).
- The Vintner's Luck (dir. Niki Caro, 2009).
- Q (dir. Laurent Bouhnik, 2011).
- Vanishing Waves (co-producer, dir. Kristina Buozyte, 2012).
- Jappeloup (dir. Christian Duguay, 2013).

=== As an actor ===
- The Ice Rink (dir. Jean-Philippe Toussaint, 1998).
- En vacances (dir. Yves Hanchar, 2000).
- Happenstance (dir. Laurent Firode, 2000).
- Les textiles (dir. Franck Landron, 2004).
- Gravida (dir. Alain Robbe-Grillet, 2006).
- The Vintner's Luck (dir. Niki Caro, 2009).
- Q (dir. Laurent Bouhnik, 2011).
