= Aurore Clément =

French actress

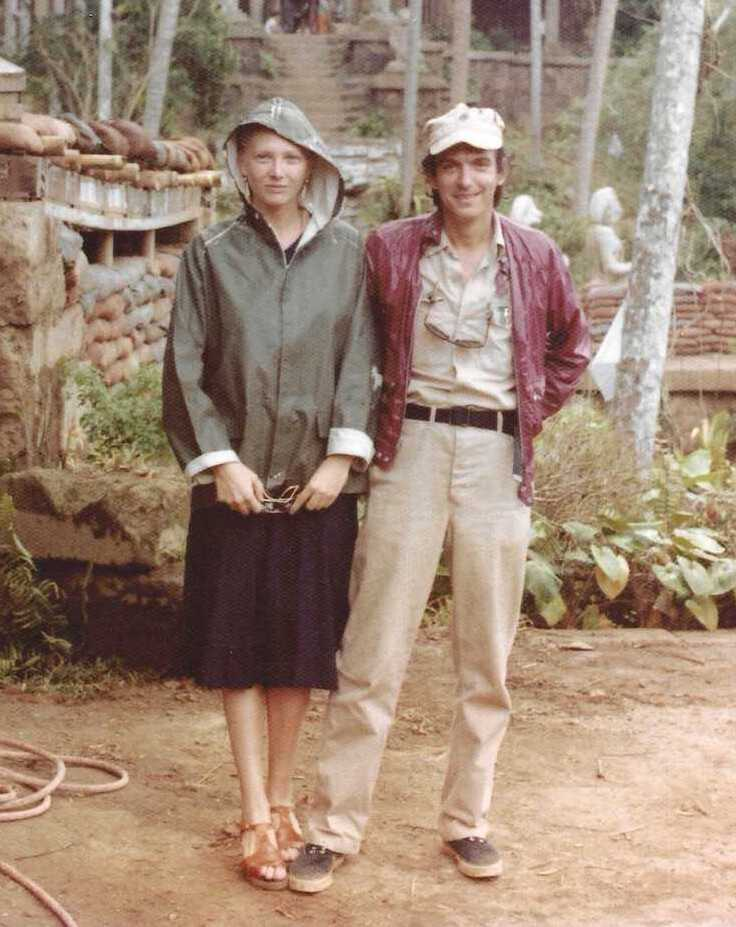
- Clément and Dean Tavoularis on the set of Apocalypse Now
- Born: Marie-Thérèse Aurore Louise Clément; 12 October 1945 (age 81); Soissons, Aisne, France
- Occupation: Actress
- Years active: 1974–present
- Spouse: Dean Tavoularis (m. 1986; died 2026)
- Children: 2

Aurore Clément (French pronunciation: [ɔʁɔʁ klemɑ̃]; born 12 October 1945) is a French actress who has appeared in French and English language movies and television productions.

== Early life ==
She was born Marie-Thérèse Aurore Louise Clément in Soissons. Following the death of her father while she was still a young girl, she worked to support her family. For a time, she modeled in Paris. Since her appearance in Louis Malle's 1974 film Lacombe Lucien, she has been cast in many roles in over five decades.

== Career ==
Clément has appeared in more than 80 films and is most often remembered as the character Anne in the film Paris, Texas (1984), which won the Palme d'Or at the Cannes Film Festival.

Her first appearance in a U.S. movie was in Francis Ford Coppola's Apocalypse Now (1979). Her scenes—a long sequence involving French former colonists—were cut from the film in its original release but restored in 2001 in the Redux version. When Coppola called her for the role she spoke no English. She has said that she did not know that her scenes were cut before she saw the finished film for the first time, more than two years after the filming.

In France, Clément made her stage debut in 1988 with The Singular Life of Albert Nobbs, adapted from George Moore's short story, and won an acting prize from The French Association of Theatre critics. She has been in several plays, including Les Eaux et Forêts and La Dame aux Camélias, for which she was nominated for the Molière Awards (the equivalent of the American Tonys).

== Personal life ==
Clément was married to Dean Tavoularis, a movie production designer, whom she had met on the set of Apocalypse Now, until his death in 2026.

== Filmography ==
| Year | Title | Role | Director | Notes |
|---|---|---|---|---|
| 1974 | Lacombe, Lucien | France Horn | Louis Malle | |
| 1975 | One Flew Over the Cuckoo's Nest | Woman on pier | Miloš Forman | |
| 1976 | Caro Michele | Angelica Vivanti | Mario Monicelli | |
| 1976 | And Agnes Chose to Die | Rina | Giuliano Montaldo | |
| 1977 | Le Juge Fayard dit Le Shériff | Michelle Louvier | Yves Boisset | |
| 1977 | Le Crabe-tambour | Aurore | Pierre Schoendoerffer | |
| 1978 | Les Rendez-vous d'Anna | Anna Silver | Chantal Akerman | |
| 1978 | Elle | The woman | Jean-François Jonvelle | short |
| 1978 | Closed Circuit | Gabriella | Giuliano Montaldo (2) | TV movie |
| 1978 | Alto tradimento | | Walter Licastro | TV movie |
| 1979 | Dear Father | Margot | Dino Risi | |
| 1979 | Lovers and Liars | Cora | Mario Monicelli (2) | |
| 1979 | Apocalypse Now | Roxanne Sarrault | Francis Ford Coppola | scenes deleted from final film, then added in the 2001 recut Apocalypse Now Redux |
| 1979 | Good News | Ada Milano | Elio Petri | |
| 1980 | 5% de risque | Laura | Jean Pourtalé | |
| 1980 | As Far as the Eye Sees | Anna Aurey | Erwin Keusch | |
| 1981 | Aimée | Aimée | Joël Farges | |
| 1982 | L'amour des femmes | Zoé | Michel Soutter | |
| 1982 | Invitation au voyage | The young woman | Peter Del Monte | |
| 1982 | The Hatter's Ghost | Berthe | Claude Chabrol | |
| 1982 | Toute une nuit | | Chantal Akerman (2) | |
| 1982 | La petite fille dans un paysage bleu | Mother | Bernard Gesbert | TV movie |
| 1982 | La quinta donna | Alexa Mehely | Alberto Negrin | TV miniseries |
| 1982 | Cinéma 16 | Jeanne | Paul Seban | TV series (1 episode) |
| 1983 | The South | Irene Ríos / Laura | Víctor Erice | |
| 1983 | Bel ami | Madeleine Forestier | Pierre Cardinal | TV miniseries |
| 1983 | Deux amies d'enfance | | Nina Companeez | TV miniseries |
| 1984 | Paris, Texas | Anne Henderson | Wim Wenders | |
| 1984 | Quidam | Wendy | Gérard Marx | TV movie |
| 1984 | Cinéma 16 | Sylvie | Bernard Dubois | TV series (1 episode) |
| 1985 | Festa di laurea | Gaia | Pupi Avati | |
| 1985 | El suizo – un amour en Espagne | | Richard Dindo | |
| 1985 | Le regard dans le miroir | Dora Stern | Jean Chapot | TV miniseries |
| 1985 | Une péniche nommée 'Réalité' | Jeanne | Paul Seban (2) | TV movie |
| 1986 | Le livre de Marie | The mother | Anne-Marie Miéville | short |
| 1987 | Farewell Moscow | Elena | Mauro Bolognini | |
| 1987 | Succubus | Francoise | Patrick Dromgoole | TV movie |
| 1987 | Bonjour maître | Geneviève Séréno | Denys de La Patellière | TV miniseries |
| 1988 | Gemini - The Twin Stars | Maria-Helena Buffington | Jacques Sandoz | |
| 1989 | Comédie d'amour | Marie D. | Jean-Pierre Rawson | |
| 1990 | Stan the Flasher | Aurore | Serge Gainsbourg | |
| 1990 | Flight from Paradise | Sarah | Ettore Pasculli | |
| 1990 | Non aprite all'uomo nero | Lori | Giulio Questi | TV movie |
| 1990 | Il piccolo popolo | Elena | Cinzia Th. Torrini | TV movie |
| 1990 | Blaues Blut | Laura Cellini | Sidney Hayers | TV miniseries |
| 1990 | Fleur bleue | | Magali Clément | TV miniseries |
| 1990 | Il giudice istruttore | Dottoressa Ciampini | Florestano Vancini | TV series (1 episode) |
| 1991 | Eline Vere | Aunt Elise | Harry Kümel | |
| 1991 | Der Einbruch | Esther | Bettina Woernle | TV movie |
| 1991 | La grande collection | Charlotte | Pierre Koralnik | TV series (1 episode) |
| 1992 | Fenêtre sur femmes | Geneviève d'Orlac | Don Kent | TV movie |
| 1992 | Solo per dirti addio | | Sergio Sollima | TV movie |
| 1992 | Maigret | Aline Calas | Serge Leroy | TV series (1 episode) |
| 1993 | Taxi de nuit | Aurore Beauvois | Serge Leroy (2) | |
| 1993 | Marie | Marie's mother | Marian Handwerker | |
| 1993 | Pas d'amour sans amour ! | Ariane | Evelyne Dress | |
| 1993 | Ici, là ou ailleurs | The woman | Vincent Loury | short |
| 1993 | La voyageuse du soir | Renée Vermorel | Igaal Niddam | TV movie |
| 1993 | Ferbac | Julie Hardouin | Roland Verhavert | TV series (1 episode) |
| 1994 | Joe & Marie | Joe's mother | Tania Stöcklin | |
| 1994 | Du poulet | The woman | Tatiana Vialle | short |
| 1994 | Passé sous silence | Maria Sandrelli | Igaal Niddam (2) | TV movie |
| 1995 | Facciamo paradiso | Claudia's mother | Mario Monicelli (3) | |
| 1996 | My Man | Woman of the World | Bertrand Blier | |
| 1996 | Les faux médicaments | Madame Oger | Alain-Michel Blanc | TV movie |
| 1996 | Les alsaciens - ou les deux Mathilde | Mathilde | Michel Favart | TV miniseries |
| 1997 | Nous sommes tous encore ici | Calliclès | Anne-Marie Miéville (2) | |
| 1997 | Un homme | Clothilde | Robert Mazoyer | TV movie |
| 1998 | For Sale | Alice | Laetitia Masson | |
| 1998 | Week-end ! | Sophie | Arnaud Sélignac | TV movie |
| 1998 | Papa est monté au ciel | Roseline | Jacques Renard | TV movie |
| 1999 | C'était là depuis l'après-midi | | Stéphane Metge | short |
| 1999 | Chasseurs d'écume | Liliane | Denys Granier-Deferre | TV miniseries |
| 2000 | La Captive | Léa | Chantal Akerman (3) | |
| 2000 | Jet Set | Nicole Chutz | Fabien Onteniente | |
| 2000 | Love me | Gabrielle's mother | Laetitia Masson (2) | |
| 2000 | Faites comme si je n'étais pas là | Hélène | Olivier Jahan | |
| 2000 | L'été des hannetons | Inge Galtat | Philippe Venault | TV movie |
| 2001 | Trouble Every Day | Jeanne | Claire Denis | |
| 2001 | Tanguy | Carole | Étienne Chatiliez | |
| 2001 | Les âmes câlines | Christine | Thomas Bardinet | |
| 2001 | Léonard de Vinci | Voice-over | Jean-Claude Lubtchansky | Documentary film |
| 2002 | A Private Affair | Madame Siprien | Guillaume Nicloux | |
| 2002 | The Repentant | Blonde woman | Laetitia Masson (3) | |
| 2003 | Bon Voyage | Jacqueline de Lusse | Jean-Paul Rappeneau | |
| 2003 | Adieu | Dora | Arnaud des Pallières | |
| 2003 | Commissaire Meyer | Madeleine Scutz | Michel Favart (2) | TV series (1 episode) |
| 2004 | Tomorrow We Move | Catherine | Chantal Akerman (4) | |
| 2004 | The Bridesmaid | Christine | Claude Chabrol (2) | |
| 2004 | Happily Ever After | The teacher's mother | Yvan Attal | |
| 2004 | Ce qu'ils imaginent | Juliette's mother | Anne Théron | |
| 2004 | Victoire | The mother-in-law | Stéphanie Murat | |
| 2004 | Pierre et Jean | Geneviève Rolland | Daniel Janneau | TV movie |
| 2004 | Zodiaque | Grâce Delaître | Claude-Michel Rome | TV miniseries |
| 2005 | Little Jerusalem | Woman at Mikva | Karin Albou | |
| 2006 | Marie Antoinette | Char Duchess | Sofia Coppola | |
| 2006 | Mon frère se marie | Claire | Jean-Stéphane Bron | |
| 2006 | Le maître du Zodiaque | Grâce Delaître | Claude-Michel Rome (2) | TV miniseries |
| 2006 | Louis la brocante | Clara Wagner | Patrick Marty | TV series (1 episode) |
| 2006 | Le président Ferrare | Anne Jacquier | Alain Nahum | TV series (3 episodes) |
| 2007 | Nuage | Marianne | Sébastien Betbeder | |
| 2007 | Chute libre | Jeanne Bienvenu | Olivier Dorigan | short |
| 2007 | Divine Émilie | Duchess of St Pierre | Arnaud Sélignac (2) | TV movie |
| 2008 | 48 heures par jour | Hélène Lecomte | Catherine Castel | |
| 2008 | On War | Bertrand's mother | Bertrand Bonello | |
| 2008 | Cortex | Marie | Nicolas Boukhrief | |
| 2008 | Sans Howard | Evelyne | Ricardo Muñoz | short |
| 2009 | L'insurgée | Christiane | Laurent Perreau | |
| 2009 | The Passenger | | Aurélien Vernhes-Lermusiaux | |
| 2009 | La vie lointaine | | Sébastien Betbeder (2) | |
| 2009 | Pina Colada | Sandrine Miller | Alice Winocour | short |
| 2010 | Pièce montée | Catherine | Denys Granier-Deferre (2) | |
| 2010 | Dans ta bouche | Rose Kennedy | Laetitia Masson (4) | |
| 2010 | Je suis un no man's land | Philippe's mother | Thierry Jousse | |
| 2010 | Petite fille | The mother | Laetitia Masson (5) | TV movie |
| 2010 | Double enquête | Hélène Costes | Pierre Boutron | TV movie |
| 2010 | La maison des Rocheville | Marie de Rocheville | Jacques Otmezguine | TV miniseries |
| 2011 | Let My People Go ! | Françoise | Mikael Buch | |
| 2011 | Des vents contraires | Madame Pierson | Jalil Lespert | |
| 2011 | L'hiver dernier | Madeleine | John Shank | |
| 2012 | Cornouaille | Odile's mother | Anne Le Ny | |
| 2012 | Rondo | Suzanne | Olivier van Malderghem | |
| 2012 | Miroir mon amour | Queen Aurore | Siegrid Alnoy | TV movie |
| 2014 | The New Girlfriend | Liz | François Ozon | |
| 2015 | A Bigger Splash | Mireille | Luca Guadagnino | |
| 2017 | Barbara | Esther | Mathieu Amalric | |
