= Anh Duong =

French-American artist, actress, and model (born 1960)

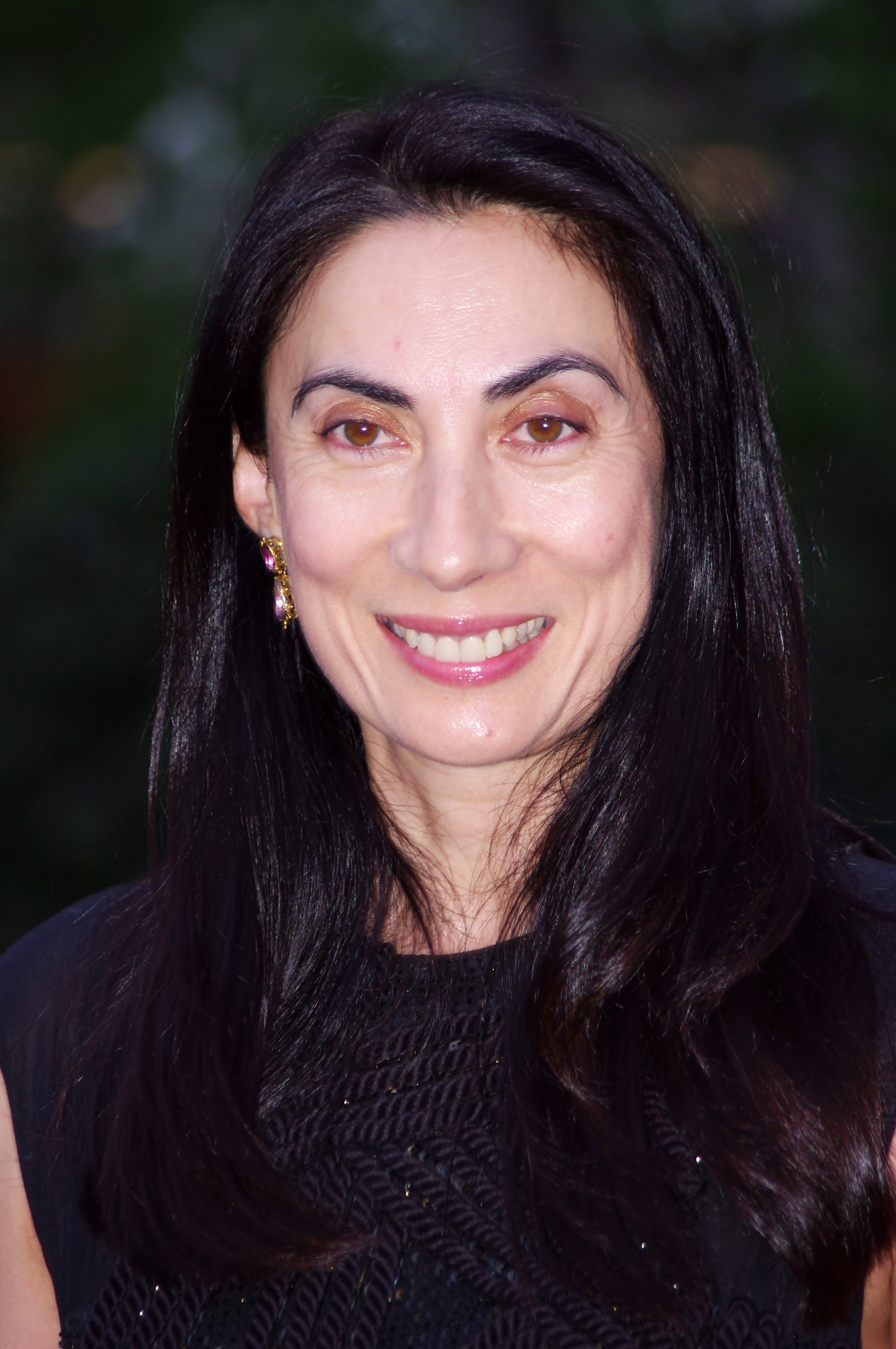
- Duong at the 2011 Tribeca Film Festival Vanity Fair party
- Born: 25 October 1960 (age 65); Bordeaux, Gironde, France
- Occupations: Artist, actress, model
- Years active: 1988–present
- Spouse: Barton Hubbard Quillen (m. 2006; div. 2008)

Anh Duong (born 25 October 1960) is a French-American artist, actress, and model. She is known for her self-portraits, which she has compared to a visual diary, as well as portraits of significant art collectors and influencers.

== Early life ==
Duong was born in Bordeaux, France, to a Spanish mother and a Vietnamese father. Duong studied architecture at the École des Beaux-Arts in Paris, France. Having aspired to be a ballerina from an early age, she decided to pursue classical dance. Duong studied with the Franchetti Academy of Classical Dance and Tessa Beaumont until she embarked on a modeling career—being photographed for Vogue, among other publications.

In 1988, Duong moved to New York City and began a career as an artist and an actress.

== Modeling career ==
While she was a ballet dancer in Paris, Duong was discovered by photographer David Seidner. He launched her career as a fashion model by featuring her with Tina Chow in the Yves Saint Laurent campaign for Vogue. During her first years as an international fashion model, she appeared in several fashion campaigns for designers such as Emanuel Ungaro and Sybilla, for which she was photographed by Deborah Turbeville and Javier Vallhonrat. She then was featured in numerous editorials including Vogue (Italian, American, French, German and British), Harper's Bazaar, and Elle.

Duong was introduced to Christian Lacroix, who was launching his couture house in Paris. She quickly became one of his favorite muses for his campaign and runway fashion shows. Around that time, Duong met Dolce & Gabbana in Milan, John Galliano in London, and Sybilla in Spain, and was in their first runway shows. She consistently walked for the world's top fashion designers for fashion weeks in New York, Milan, London, and Paris. They included Yohji Yamamoto, Moschino, Isaac Mizrahi, Christian Dior, Donna Karan, Karl Lagerfeld, and Geoffrey Beene.

In 1988, Duong began to re-focus her acting and art career. During this time, the fashion world was leaning towards using non-models in their magazines and campaigns, and so Duong embarked on a second phase of her modeling career, as an artist featured in various campaigns. She was featured in the famous first Gap Inc. campaign shot by Herb Ritts and featured other artists and actors, all in black and white. She has been shot by Steven Meisel, Michel Comte, and Peter Lindbergh for Donna Karan and has been featured in the J. Crew and Banana Republic campaigns.

In 2013, Duong was photographed by Patrick Demarchelier for Bottega Veneta.

Today she is represented by IMG Worldwide.

Anh Duong has graced many best dressed lists, most notably the International Best Dressed List by Eleanor Lambert.

== Acting career ==
In 1992, Duong was cast in The Mambo Kings as her debut feature film role. Her career also includes roles in such films as I Shot Andy Warhol and Lisa Cholodenko's High Art, which was presented in Cannes and also at the Sundance Film Festival. Duong also acted in two films by French director Laetitia Masson, For Sale and Love Me, the latter of which was screened at the Berlin Film Festival.

In 2013, Duong worked on Desiree Akhavan's first feature film, Appropriate Behavior, in which she played Nasrin, the lead character's mother. The film premiered at the Sundance Film Festival in 2014.

Duong also appeared in Laetitia Masson's French movie, GHB.

== Filmography ==
Year	Title	Role	Director	Notes
1992	The Mambo Kings	Ismelda Perez	Arne Glimcher	
1992	Scent of a Woman	Sofia	Martin Brest	
1996	I Shot Andy Warhol	Comtesse De Courcy	Mary Harron	
1997	My Best Friend's Wedding	Dining Guest	P. J. Hogan	
1998	High Art	Dominique	Lisa Cholodenko	
1998	For Sale	The American Painter	Laetitia Masson	
2000	Love Me	Gloria	Laetitia Masson	
2014	Appropriate Behavior	Nasrin	Desiree Akhavan	
2014	Welcome to New York	Livia	Abel Ferrara	
2014	GHB	La femme riche	Laetitia Masson	
2015	Creative Control	Fashion Director	Benjamin Dickinson	
2017	The Only Living Boy in New York	Barbara	Marc Webb	
2019	No Fault	Anne	Myna Joseph	Short
2019	Uncut Gems	Anne	Josh and Benny Safdie	

== Art career ==
Although Duong has always drawn and painted, it was after spending a summer painting at the Warhol Estate in Montauk in 1989 that she decided to focus on art. Soon after in 1991, she had her first solo exhibition at Sperone Westwater Gallery of 12 large portraits measuring 8 × 6 feet each.

In 1997, she had her first museum exhibition at P.M.M.K. – Provincial Museum of Modern Art, Ostende, Belgium which led to an exhibition at Galerie Jérôme de Noirmont in Paris in 1999 with more than 65 Self-portraits on display followed by a show at the Tony Shafrazi Gallery in New York in 2000.

A book about her work, Anh Duong (Self) Portraits, was published in 2001.

Duong has since become a recognized painter in New York City. Forgetting the subject to focus on the technical painting itself, she focuses on the portrait, and mostly the self-portrait she has painted on a daily basis as a diary. "(...) her paintings expose an unexpected, unglamorous, intimate relationship with her body (...) Duong's paintings should be viewed as contributions to a different genre – they belong alongside the work of women such as Dora Maar, Anaïs Nin, and Frida Kahlo, artists who compellingly exposed interior worlds whose beauty, intelligence, and character inspired creativity, both in themselves and in others."

Today, she is represented by Galerie Gmurzynska. For her exhibition at Robilant + Voena in 2014 a catalogue was published with an essay called True Selfie by Phoebe Hoban in which she writes: "Painter Anh Duong has created her own personal genre: call it the 'True Selfie.' Long before digital self-images—or 'selfies'—became virtually ubiquitous, Duong, like many figurative painters, decided to make herself the subject of an ongoing series of self-portraits. But unlike other painters, who rely on their own reflection in a mirror as a reference, Duong has exclusively focused on portraying what she calls her 'true' self."

Duong's latest series of paintings, done over the past two years, shows the artist in a variety of poses, from provocatively trapped in the kitchen in couture underwear, to nakedly framed in a bathtub. But they all share the same arresting sense of the artist seeing herself for the first time, thus catching herself in a moment of profound psychological vulnerability. Stripped of her familiar, everyday persona, the paintings powerfully project dormant layers of Duong's inner self. "I feel like painting is a place where I can both hide, and I can show the most."

The National Portrait Gallery (United States) acquired an 8 x 6-foot portrait Duong painted of Diane von Furstenberg, which was part of the touring exhibition Journey of a Dress.

== Commissioned portraits ==
Duong has also worked on a number of portraits commissioned by collectors such as Bruno Bischofberger, Aby Rosen, Princess Maria Theresia of Thurn and Taxis (daughter of Gloria, Princess of Thurn and Taxis), Simon de Pury and figures such as Natalia Vodianova, Domenico Dolce, and Diane von Furstenberg.

Duong created a 9-foot-tall sculpture of Diane von Furstenberg for Barry Diller, used as the figurehead of his yacht, Eos.

== Exhibitions ==
- 1990 – Anh Duong (solo exhibition) at Sperone Westwater Gallery, New York, New York.
- 1993 – Anh Duong (group exhibition) at Daniel Blau Gallery, Munich, Germany. (booklet)
- 1995 – Anh Duong (solo exhibition) at Fukuoka Akarenga Cultural Center, Fukuoka City, Japan. (catalogue)
- 1997 – Anh Duong (solo exhibition) at P.M.M.K. - Provincial Museum of Modern Art, Ostende, Belgium. (catalogue)
- 1998 – Anh Duong (group exhibition) at Guy McIntyre Gallery, New York, New York.
- 1999 – Anh Duong – Autoportraits (solo exhibition) at Galerie Jérôme de Noirmont, Paris, France.
- 2000 – Anh Duong (solo exhibition) at Tony Shafrazi Gallery, New York, New York. (catalogue)
- 2001 – Anh Duong – La mariée mise à nu par les célibataires (solo exhibition) at Galerie Jérôme de Noirmont, Paris, France.
- 2003 – FIAC (group exhibition) at Galerie Jérôme de Noirmont, Paris, France.
- 2005 – Anh Duong – Flowers (solo exhibition) at Galerie Jérôme de Noirmont, Paris, France.
- 2009 – The Female Gaze: Women Look at Women (group exhibition) at Cheim & Read, New York, New York.
- 2011 – Anh Duong – Self Portraits (solo exhibition) at Sonnabend Gallery, New York, New York.
- 2012 – Untitled (Giotto's O) (group exhibition) at Sperone Westwater Gallery, Lugano, Switzerland.
- 2012 – About Face (group exhibition) at ACME, Los Angeles, California. Curated by Daniel Weinberg.
- 2012 – The Haberdashery (group exhibition) at Eric Firestone Gallery, East Hampton, New York.
- 2012 – Portraits/Self-Portraits from the 16th to 21st Century (group exhibition) at Sperone Westwater Gallery, New York, New York
- 2012 – Other Exhibitions (group exhibition) at Sonnabend Gallery, New York, New York.
- 2014 – Anh Duong – Can You See Me (solo exhibition) at Robilant + Voena, London, England.
- 2021 – Anh Duong – La Tentation d'Exister. There Is Always Champagne in the Fridge (solo exhibition) at Galerie Gmurzynska, Zurich, Switzerland

== Publications ==
- Duong, Anh (1995). Anh Duong: Paintings. Fukuoka-City, Japan: Moritomo. OCLC 71793401.
- Duong, Anh; Van de Walle, Mark (2000). Anh Duong: June 29–September 16, 2000. New York: Tony Shafrazi Gallery. ISBN 978-1-891475-20-7.
- Duong, Anh; O'Brien, Glenn (2001). Anh Duong (Self) Portraits. New York, NY: Assouline. ISBN 978-2-84323-285-5.
- Duong, Anh (2014). Anh Duong. London: Robilant + Voena. OCLC 941636714.
- Duong, Anh; Dimitrova, Mira; Voena, Marco; Hoban, Phoebe (2014). Anh Duong: Can You See Me. Robilant + Voena. OCLC 876721757.

== Awards ==
- 2011 – Veuve Clicquot Tribute to Inspiring Women Award

== Personal life ==
Duong has been involved in relationships with artist Julian Schnabel and auction house owner Simon de Pury.

In June 2006, Duong married Barton Hubbard Quillen, an architect whose maternal grandmother was the third wife of financier Thomas Mellon Evans Jr., owner of 1981 Kentucky Derby winner Pleasant Colony. The couple divorced in 2008.

Duong lives and works between New York and East Hampton.
