= Jean-Philippe Toussaint =

Belgian writer and filmmaker

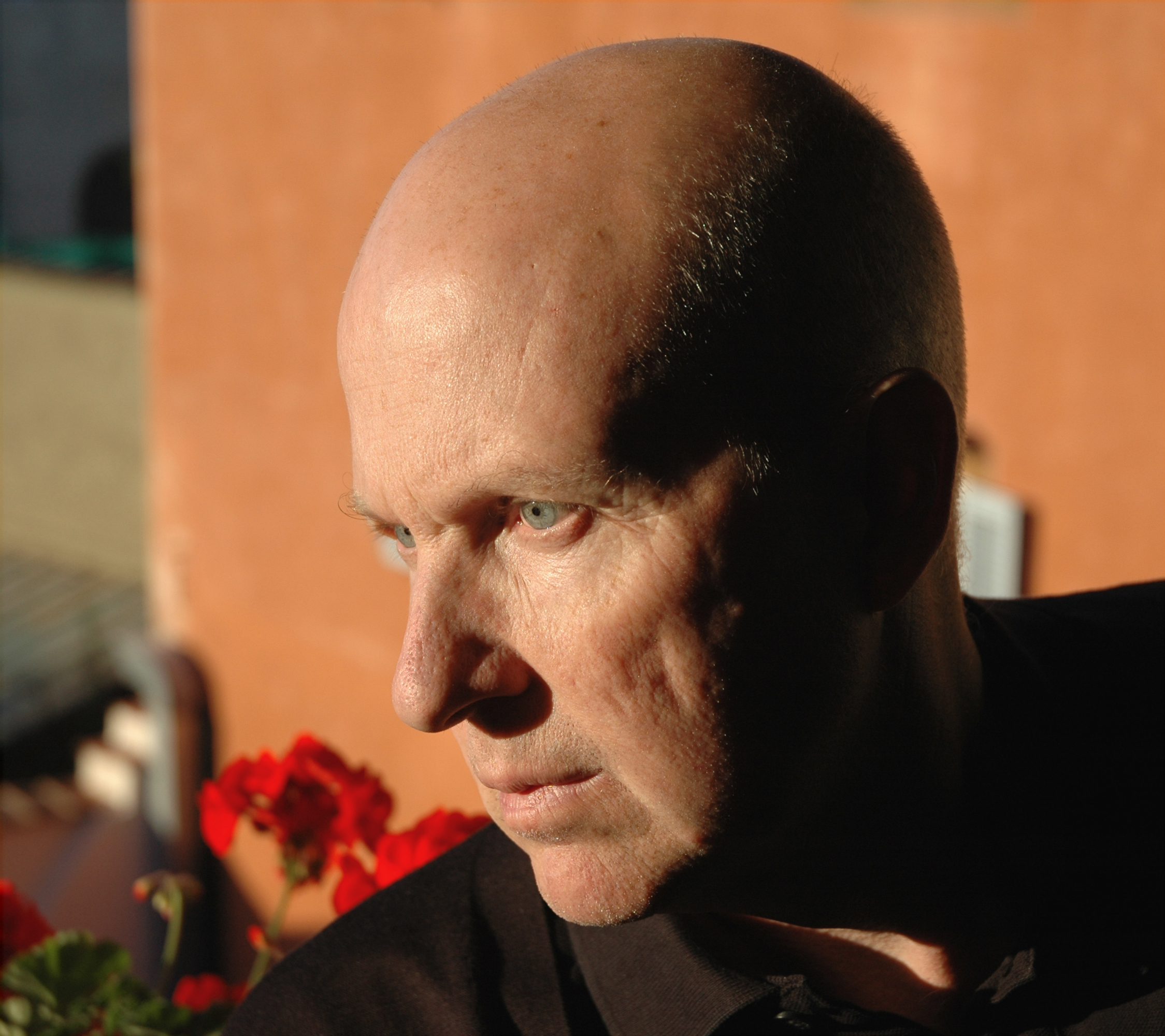
- Jean-Philippe Toussaint in 2013
- Born: 29 November 1957 (age 68); Brussels, Belgium
- Education: Sciences Po (1978)
- Occupations: Novelist; Screenwriter; Director
- Writing career
- Notable works: La Salle de bain; La Télévision; « Cycle of Marie »
- Notable awards: Prix Victor-Rossel; Prix Médicis; Prix Décembre; André Cavens Award
- Website: www.jptoussaint.com

Jean-Philippe Toussaint (29 November 1957, Brussels) is a Belgian novelist, photographer and filmmaker. His books have been translated into more than twenty languages and he has had his photographs displayed in Brussels and Japan. Toussaint won the Prix Médicis in 2005 for his novel Fuir (Running Away), the second volume of the « Cycle of Marie », a four-tome chronicle published over ten years and displaying the separation of Marie and her lover. His 2009 novel La Vérité sur Marie (The Truth about Marie), third volume of the cycle, won the Prix Décembre.

== Family ==
Jean-Philippe Toussaint was born in Brussels, son of the Belgian journalist and writer Yvon Toussaint (1933–2013) and a bookseller mother of Lithuanian descent Monique Toussaint (née Lanskoronskis), but mostly raised in Paris where his father was the correspondent in France of the Belgian newspaper Le Soir. He's the brother of the Belgian cinema producer Anne-Dominique Toussaint.

He lives in Brussels and Corsica. His wife and mother of his two children, Madeleine Santandrea, is from Bastia.

== Early life and education ==
Raised in flourishing cultural milieu in Brussels, then after 1970 in Paris where he attended high school, he graduated from the Institut d'études politiques de Paris (1979) and holds a master of Arts in contemporary history from the Sorbonne (1980). After his studies, he was engaged in teaching French for two years in Médéa, Algeria as an alternative to conscription; he henceforth decided to devote himself to literature, considering cinema to be technically and financially too demanding.

== Literary career ==
Jean-Philippe Toussaint's first two plays Rideau (1981) and Les Draps de lit (1982) and his short novel Échecs (1983) have never been published. He is strongly influenced by Samuel Beckett's style and generally by the Nouveau Roman. He wrote his first novel, La Salle de bain (The Bathroom) in 1985 and submitted it to Jérôme Lindon, the influential publisher of Les Éditions de Minuit in Paris, who accepted it and became his exclusive publisher. The novel and its style were critically acclaimed and established Jean-Philippe Toussaint as a young and promising author. Subsequently, he published Monsieur (a novel that earned a large following in Japan and Asia) and L'Appareil-photo in the late 1980s which confirmed his status as a writer and allowed him to start a parallel career as a filmmaker. He directed two movies soon after: Monsieur (1990)—distinguished by the André Cavens Award—and La Sévillane (1992).

During a writing residency in Berlin in 1997 he wrote his most ironic and "subtly comic" novel La Télévision which won the Prix Victor-Rossel in Belgium. After publishing an essay, Autoportrait (à l'étranger), based on his experiences living abroad, he then decided to embark on a series of novels (entitled « cycle of Marie Madeleine Marguerite de Montalte » but formally known as « cycle of Marie », named after Marie, the main protagonist) depicting the long and uncertain breakup of two lovers—Marie and the narrator—over four seasons during the course of a year. The books were written between 2000 and 2013 and constitute his Magnum opus. The « cycle of Marie » started in 2002 with Faire l'amour (Making Love, 2004), followed by Fuir in 2005 (Running Away, 2009)—awarded by the Prix Médicis in France—, La Vérité sur Marie in 2009 (The Truth about Marie, 2011)—Prix Décembre—and finally Nue in 2013 which closes the tetralogy.

His 2006 book La Mélancolie de Zidane (2006) is a lyrical essay on the French football player Zinedine Zidane's headbutting of the Italian player Marco Materazzi during the 2006 World Cup final in Berlin. Toussaint lived in Berlin at the time and was at the game. An English translation was published in 2007 in the British journal New Formations.

Along with Jean Echenoz, Laurent Mauvignier, Marie NDiaye or Éric Chevillard, Jean-Philippe Toussaint is associated with the so-called « Style [des éditions de] Minuit ».

== Works ==
- La Salle de bain (Paris, Minuit, 1985)
  - The Bathroom (Champaign, Dalkey Archive Press, 2008), translated by Nancy Amphoux and Paul De Angelis.
- Monsieur (Minuit, 1986)
  - Monsieur (Champaign, Dalkey Archive Press, 2008), translated by John Lambert.
- L'Appareil-photo (Minuit, 1989)
  - Camera (Champaign, Dalkey Archive Press, 2008), translated by Matthew B. Smith.
- La Réticence (Minuit, 1991)
  - Reticence (Champaign, Dalkey Archive Press, 2012), translated by John Lambert.
- La Télévision (Minuit, 1997); Prix Victor-Rossel
  - Television (Champaign, Dalkey Archive Press, 2007), translated by Jordan Stump.
- Autoportrait (à l'étranger) (Minuit, 2000)
  - Self-Portrait Abroad (Champaign, Dalkey Archive Press, 2010), translated by John Lambert.
- La Mélancolie de Zidane (Minuit, 2006), essay
  - "Zidane's Melancholy" within Best European Fiction (Champaign, Dalky Archive Press, 2009), translated by Thangam Ravindranathan and Timothy Bewes
- L'Urgence et la Patience (Minuit, 2012), essay
  - Urgency and Patience (Champaign, Dalkey Archive Press, 2015), translated by Edward Gauvin
- Football (Minuit, 2015)
  - Football (Fitzcarraldo Editions, 2016), translated by Shaun Whiteside.

« Cycle of Marie »

- Faire l'amour (Minuit, 2002)
  - Making Love (New York, The New Press, 2004), translated by Linda Coverdale
- Fuir (Minuit, 2005); Prix Médicis
  - Running Away (Champaign, Dalkey Archive Press, 2009), translated by Matthew B. Smith.
- La Vérité sur Marie (Minuit, 2009); Prix Décembre
  - The Truth about Marie (Champaign, Dalkey Archive Press, 2011), translated by Matthew B. Smith.
- Nue (Minuit, 2013)
  - Naked (Dalkey Archive Press, 2016), translated by Edward Gauvin.

== Films ==
- La Salle de bain (1989) by John Lvoff, Screenwriter. Starring Tom Novembre, Gunilla Karlzen.
- Monsieur (1990), Director / Screenwriter. Starring Dominic Gould, Wojciech Pszoniak.
- La Sévillane (1992), Director / Screenwriter. Starring Mireille Perrier, Jean-Claude Adelin, Jean Yanne.
- La Patinoire (1999), Director / Screenwriter. Starring Tom Novembre, Mireille Perrier, Dolorès Chaplin, Bruce Campbell, Marie-France Pisier, Jean-Pierre Cassel.
- Trois fragments de "Fuir" : Louvre/Chine/Elbe (short-films, 2011), Director. Starring Dolorès Chaplin.

== Exhibitions ==
As a photographer, he held his first major exhibition in 2001 in Osaka, Japan then later obtained a residency in 2006 in Toulouse, France where he extended his work to installations mixing neons, films, photos and books as supports. This work became also the basis of a more ambitious exhibition which took place in 2009 in Canton, China. In 2012, as invited artist, Toussaint curated an important exhibition entitled "Livre/Louvre" at the Musée du Louvre in Paris. In addition to photographs, original short films (entitled Trois fragments de "Fuir") and various installations, the show featured an excerpt from the original manuscript of En attendant Godot by Samuel Beckett and a copy of the eighth edition of Dante's Divina Commedia.

== Distinction ==
- Elected member (seat #9) of the Académie royale de langue et de littérature françaises de Belgique (2014)
