= Mireille Perrier =

French actress

- Born: 14 November 1959 (age 66); Blois, France
- Occupations: Actress, Stage director
- Spouse: 1983-present

Mireille Perrier (born 14 November 1959) is a French actress and stage director.

== Career ==
She debut in theater with the Compagnie du Hasard in 1977, where she remained a member for two years.

Her first starring role was in Leos Carax's Boy Meets Girl in 1984. Since then, Perrier has had major roles in other films such as Un monde sans pitié, Netchaïev est de retour, Toto le Héros, À vendre, Le Comptoir, Un dérangement considérable and L'entraînement du champion avant la course.

In 1991, Perrier received a Joseph Plateau Award in the "Best Belgian Actress" category for her work in the Belgian film Toto le Héros.

== Theater ==
Year	Title	Author	Director
1984	Les Burgraves	Victor Hugo	Mireille Perrier
1985	La Princesse blanche	Rainer Maria Rilke	Yannis Kokkos
1989	Les Parisiens ou l'été de la mémoire des abeilles	Pascal Rambert	Pascal Rambert
1991	L'Otage	Paul Claudel	Claude Stratz
1994	Summerfolk	Maxim Gorky	Lluis Pasqual
1995	Love's Labour's Lost	William Shakespeare	Laurent Pelly
1996	L'Heureux Stratagème	Pierre de Marivaux	Laurent Pelly
1998	Flip !	Tom Rooney	Roger Miremont
2000	Diotime et les lions	Henry Bauchau	Valérie Cordy
2000–2003	Une petite fille privilégiée	Francine Christophe	Philippe Ogouz
2003–2004	La Dispute	Pierre de Marivaux	Philip Forgeau
2004	Émerveilles	Patrick Chamoiseau	Mireille Perrier
2004	J'étais dans ma maison et j'attendais que la pluie vienne	Jean-Luc Lagarce	Joël Jouanneau
2006	Conversations après un enterrement	Yasmina Reza	Gabriel Garran
2007–2008	Sans tuer on ne peut pas	Roland Fichet	Gianni-Grégory Fornet & Régine Chopinot
2009–2010	Anna Politkovskaya : non rééducable	Stefano Massini	Mireille Perrier
2009–2010	La Guerre des fils de lumière contre les fils des ténèbres	Flavius Josephus	Amos Gitai
2010	La Joie	Laurent Roth	Laurent Roth
2010	La Chose	Laurent Roth	Laurent Roth
2012	J'habite une blessure sacrée	Mireille Perrier & Jean Ziegler	Mireille Perrier
2013	Play and Theory of the Duende	Federico García Lorca	Benjamin Barou-Crossman

== Filmography ==
Year	Title	Role	Director	Notes
1983	La bête noire	Sonia	Patrick Chaput	
1984	Boy Meets Girl	Mireille	Leos Carax	
1985	Elle a passé tant d'heures sous les sunlights...	Marie	Philippe Garrel	
1986	Jour et nuit	Anna	Jean-Bernard Menoud	
1986	High Speed	Edith	Monique Dartonne & Michel Kaptur	
1986	Mauvais Sang	The young mother	Leos Carax	
1986	Gardien de la nuit	The postwoman	Jean-Pierre Limosin	
1987	Où que tu sois	Judith	Alain Bergala	
1987	La vallée des anges	The director	Aline Issermann	
1988	Chocolat	France Dalens	Claire Denis	
1989	Love Without Pity	Nathalie	Éric Rochant	Nominated - César Award for Most Promising Actress
1990	L'autre		Juliette Frey	Short
1991	Toto the Hero	Adult Evelyne	Jaco Van Dormael	Joseph Plateau Award for Best Belgian Actress
1991	Netchaïev est de retour	Sylvie	Jacques Deray	
1991	J'entends plus la guitare	Lola	Philippe Garrel	
1991	L'entraînement du champion avant la course	Liliane	Bernard Favre	
1991	Vies mêlées		Martine Robert	Short
1991	Ne plus jamais dormir		Bernar Hébert	Short
1991	L'aventure d'une baigneuse		Philippe Donzelot	Short
1992	La sévillane	Pascale	Jean-Philippe Toussaint	
1992	Golem, the Spirit of the Exile	Ruth	Amos Gitai	
1993	Trahir	Laura Cocea	Radu Mihăileanu	
1993	Shadow of a Doubt	Mother	Aline Issermann	
1993	Jeux d'enfants	Melo	Michel Léviant	TV movie
1994	Três Irmãos	The teacher	Teresa Villaverde	
1995	Krim	Sabine	Ahmed Bouchaala	
1995	Un jour, ce soir là	Gabrielle	Laurent Boulanger	
1995	Dancing nuage	Madeleine	Irène Jouannet	TV movie
1996	Je suis venue te dire		Laetitia Masson	Short
1996	L'année du certif	Claire Fontanes	Jacques Renard	TV movie
1997	Quand le soleil meurt		Pascal Courty	Short
1998	For Sale	Primo's Ex-Wife	Laetitia Masson	
1998	Le comptoir	Marie	Sophie Tatischeff	
1998	The Ice Rink	Assistant	Jean-Philippe Toussaint	
1998	Fin de siècle	Rosalie de Constant	Claude Champion	
1999	Un dérangement considérable	Fabienne	Bernard Stora	
2000	Les diseurs de vérité		Karim Traïdia	
2000	De la bouche des enfants	Angela	Nicolas Plateau	
2000	Paris-Deauville	Anne-Marie	Isabelle Broué	TV movie
2001	Les petites mains	Andrée	Lou Jeunet	TV movie
2002	L'année des grandes filles	Claire	Jacques Renard	TV movie
2002	La kiné	Sandra Barelli	Aline Issermann	TV series (1 episode)
2003	Where Is Madame Catherine?	Sophie	Marc Recha	
2003	La petite prairie aux bouleaux	Woman in Auschwitz	Marceline Loridan-Ivens	
2004	Les parisiens	The woman on the docks	Claude Lelouch	
2004	La crim'	Béatrice Forrestier	Vincent Monnet	TV series (1 episode)
2005	Le courage d'aimer	The woman on the docks	Claude Lelouch	
2005	Moloch, les chairs vives	Judith	Nicolas Namur	Short
2006	Monógamo sucesivo		Pablo Basulto	
2006	Fragments sur la grâce	A reader	Vincent Dieutre	
2006	Le bal perdu	Nina	Alfredo Diaz Perez	Short
2007	L'homme qui marche	Liliane	Aurélia Georges	
2007	La surprise	Marion	Alain Tasma	TV movie
2008	À l'est de moi	Lionel's mother	Bojena Horackova	
2008	Des Indes à la planète Mars	Catherie-Élise Müller	Christian Merlhiot & Matthieu Orléan	
2008	Procuration	The mother	Vital Philippot	Short
2008	Les gueules noires	Roxy	Rodolphe Bertrand & Marianne Tardieu	Short
2009	Malban		Elodie Bouedec	Short
2009	Quand maman sera partie	The trainer	Christophe Monier	Short
2010	Orly	The mother	Angela Schanelec	
2010	Point Blank	Captain Catherine Fabre	Fred Cavayé	
2010	Toutes les filles pleurent	The teacher	Judith Godrèche	
2010	63 regards	Woman 1	Christophe Pellet	Short
2010	Fracture	Catherine Kagan	Alain Tasma	TV movie
2011	Looking for Simon	Captain	Jan Krüger	
2011	L'angle mort	Claire	Florence Benoist	Short
2011	La liberté ou l'amour	She	Geoffroi Heissler	Short
2012	Comme un homme	Nathalie Delcourt	Safy Nebbou	
2013	Anna et Otto		Louis-Julien Petit	
2013	Seul le feu	Mireille	Christophe Pellet	Short
2013	La maison vide	Muriel	Mathieu Hippeau	Short
2014	May Allah Bless France!	Miss Schaeffer	Abd al Malik	
2014	Exoplanète		Christophe Pellet	Short
2014	Sofia B. dormait mal	The grandmother	Lea Triboulet	Short
2015	Nos femmes	Karine	Richard Berry	
2015	Hôtel de la plage	Rose	Christian Merret-Palmair	TV series (5 episodes)
2016	Dans la forêt	The child psychiatrist	Gilles Marchand	
2016	En attendant les barbares		Gilles Sandoz	
2017	Pris de court	Madame Nollet	Emmanuelle Cuau	
2018	Tout ce qu'il me reste de la révolution	Diane Sorel	Judith Davis	
2018	Farandole	Police Officer	Matthieu Boulet	Short
2019	Camille	Camille's mother	Boris Lojkine	
2019	Osmosis	Boss	Mona Achache	TV series (1 episode)
