= Didier Daeninckx =

French author and left-wing politician (born 1949)

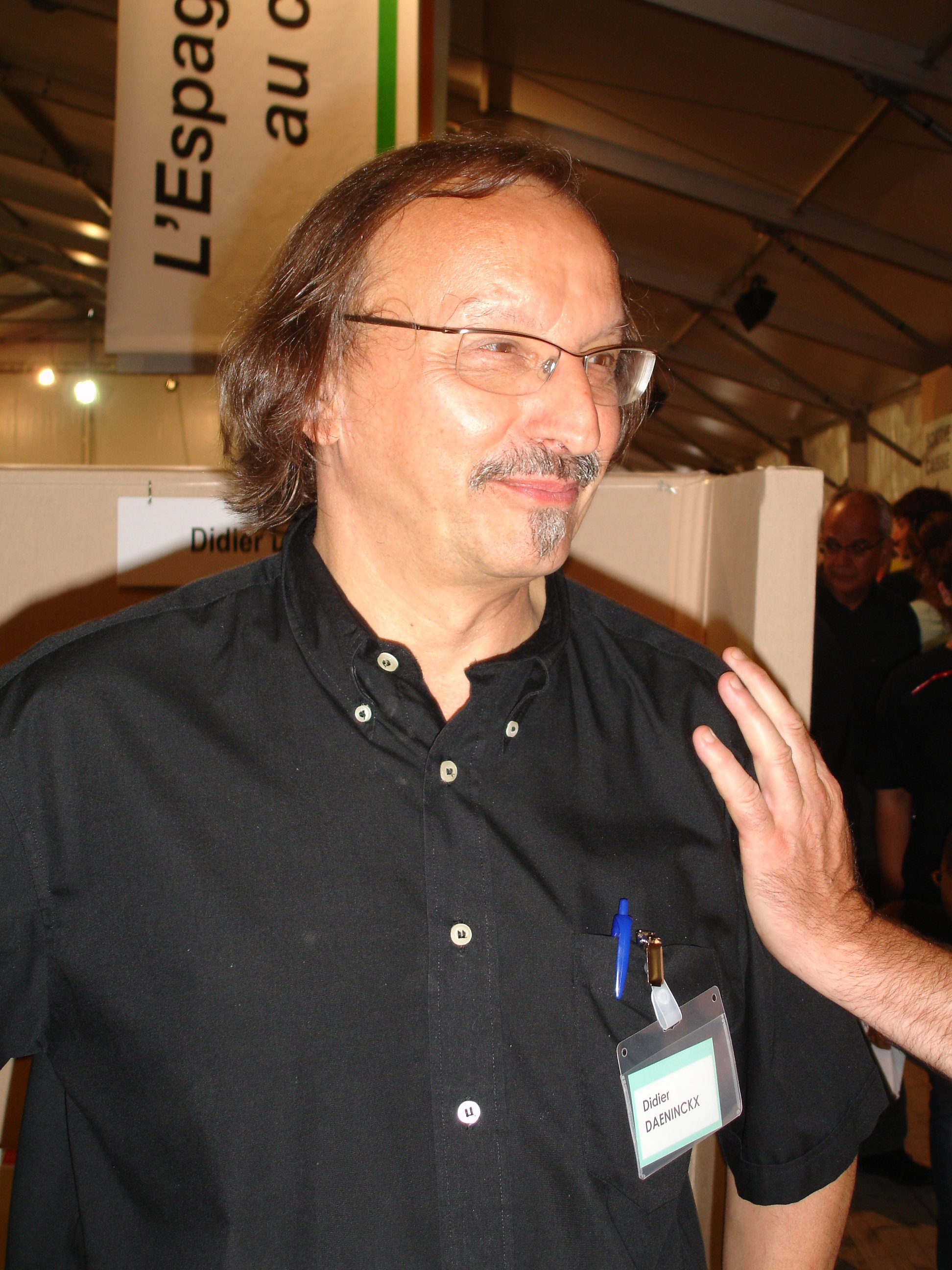
- Daeninckx at the Fête de l'Humanité in 2006
- Born: 29 April 1949 (age 77); Saint-Denis, Seine, French Fourth Republic
- Writing career
- Language: French
- Notable awards: Trophées 813 1984; Grand Prix de Littérature Policière 1985; Prix Mystère de la critique 1987; Prix Eugène-Dabit du roman populiste 1990; Prix Goncourt de la nouvelle 2012

Didier Daeninckx (born 27 April 1949 in Saint-Denis, Seine) is a French author and left-wing politician of Belgian descent, best known for his romans noirs.

== Works translated into English ==
- Daeninckx, Didier (2005). Murder in Memoriam [Meurtres pour mémoire]. Translated by Heron, Liz. Serpent's Tail. ISBN 1852427957.
- Daeninckx, Didier (2012). A Very Profitable War [Le Der des ders]. Translated by Martin, Sarah. Melville House Publishing. ISBN 1612191843.
- Daeninckx, Didier (2014). Nazis in the Metro [Nazis dans le métro]. Translated by Moschovakis, Anna. Melville House Publishing. ISBN 9781612192963.

== Screen adaptations ==
- Héroïnes, directed by Gérard Krawczyk, based on Play Back
- The Repentant, directed by Laetitia Masson, loosely based on the 1999 novella La Repentie
