= Dean Tavoularis =

American film production designer (1932–2026)

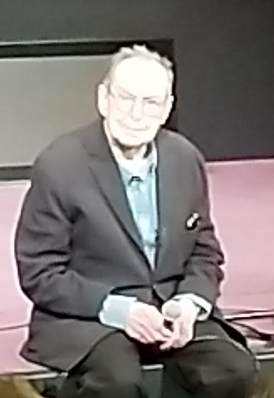
- Tavoularis in 2022
- Born: Constantine Tavoularis; May 18, 1932; Lowell, Massachusetts, U.S.
- Died: April 2026 (aged 93); Paris, France
- Occupation: Production designer
- Years active: 1967–2001
- Spouse: Aurore Clément (m. 1986)
- Children: 2

Dean Tavoularis (May 18, 1932 – April 22 or 23, 2026) was an American motion picture production designer whose work appeared in numerous box office hits such as The Godfather films, Apocalypse Now, The Brink's Job, One from the Heart, and Bonnie and Clyde. He worked with Francis Ford Coppola on thirteen features, and won the Academy Award for Best Art Direction for The Godfather Part II (1974) from five nominations.

== Life and career ==
Born Constantine Tavoularis in Lowell, Massachusetts, to Greek immigrant parents, he grew up in Los Angeles. His father ran a cafeteria in Los Angeles whose major clients included the 20th Century Fox studios, and as a boy Tavoularis helped deliver coffee there during the summer holidays. He studied architecture and painting at the Los Angeles County Art Institute (now Otis College of Art and Design) and landed a job at the Disney Studios first as an in-betweener in the animation department, and later as a storyboard artist. He afterwards worked as an assistant art director at Columbia, Universal, Warner Bros. and MGM, and his feature work began with Inside Daisy Clover (1965). In 1967, Arthur Penn called him to take charge of the artistic direction of Bonnie and Clyde, his first credit as an art director. Three years later, Penn called him once again to design Little Big Man. But it was working with Francis Ford Coppola in 1972 on The Godfather that set the creative tone of his career. The Godfather Part II and The Conversation, in 1974, consolidated their collaboration, and laid the way for what was to be their joint creative challenge: Apocalypse Now, the film for which Tavoularis created a nightmare jungle kingdom, inspired by Angkor Wat. It was also on the set of Apocalypse Now that he met his future wife, French actress Aurore Clément (Clément's role was eventually edited out of the final cut of the film, and only restored in the Apocalypse Now Redux version in 2001). He served as Coppola's production designer on thirteen features, from The Godfather in 1972 through to Jack in 1996.

From 1967 until 2001, he worked on over 30 films and landed five Academy Award nominations for Best Art Direction, one of which he won for The Godfather Part II. For the 1982 release One from the Heart he recreated both the Las Vegas Strip and McCarran International Airport on the sound stages of Zoetrope Studios. The list of directors with whom he worked includes: Michelangelo Antonioni (Zabriskie Point, 1970), Wim Wenders (Hammett, 1982), Warren Beatty (Bulworth, 1998), and Roman Polanski (The Ninth Gate, 1999).

Tavoularis died at a hospital in Paris in April 2026, at the age of 93. The date of his death is reported variously as April 22 or 23, 2026.
