= Frédéric Bouraly =

French actor (born 1960)

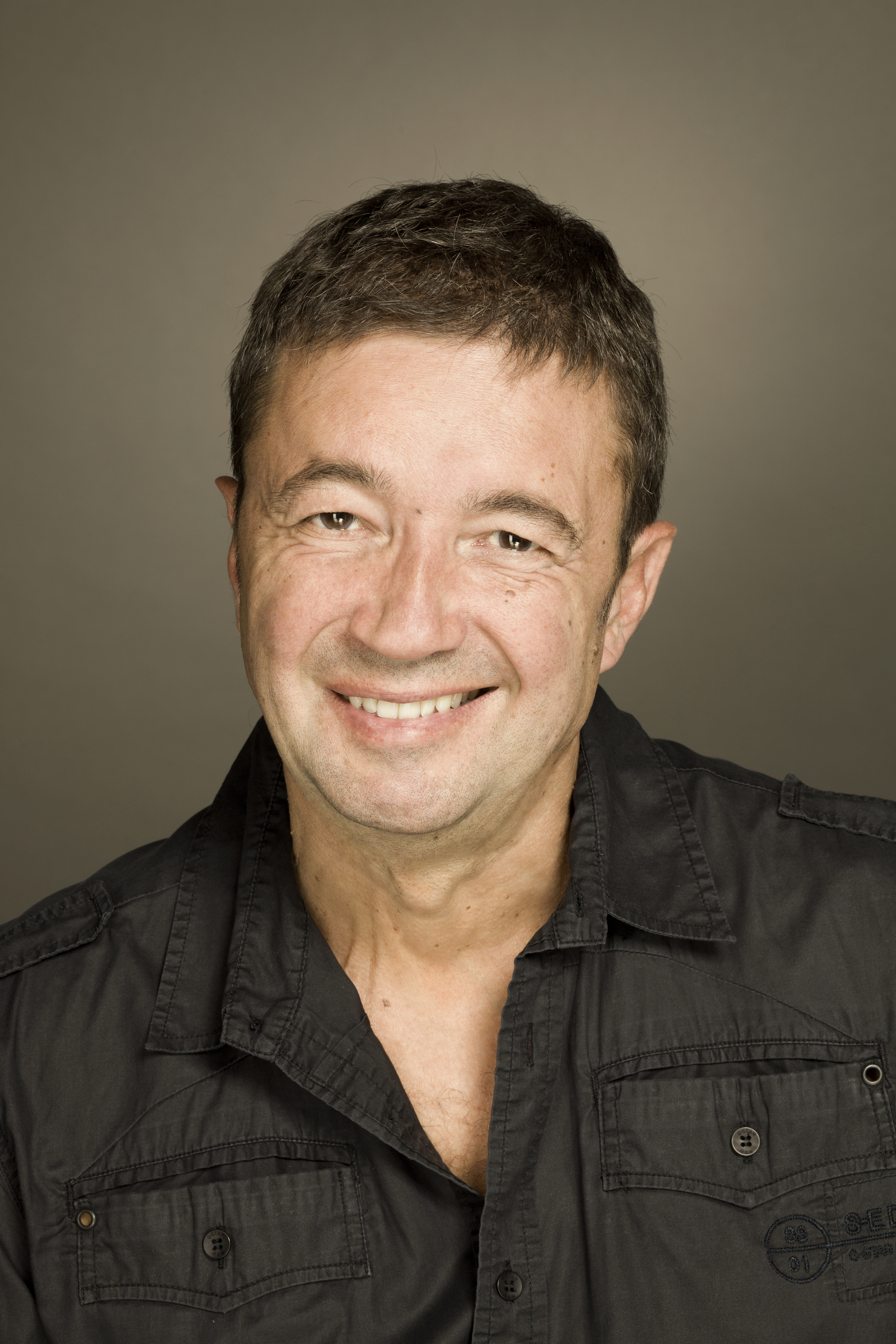
- Frédéric Bouraly in 2012
- Born: 3 May 1960 (age 65); Moulins, Allier, France
- Occupation: Actor
- Years active: 1980–present

Frédéric Bouraly (born 3 May 1960) is a French actor.

== Theater ==
Year	Title	Author	Director
1980	Deathwatch	Jean Genet	Guy Naigeon
1981	The Two Orphans	Adolphe d'Ennery & Eugène Cormon	Jean-Louis Martin-Barbaz
1982	Les Femmes Savantes	Molière	Jean-Louis Martin-Barbaz (2)
1983	Le Bourgeois gentilhomme	Molière	Jean Moign
1984	Les Deux Timides	Eugène Marin Labiche	Frédéric Bouraly
1984	Le beau beffroi	Richard Colinet	Richard Colinet
1985	Julius Caesar	William Shakespeare	Jean-Louis Martin-Barbaz (3)
1986	The Birds	Aristophanes	Robert Bensimon
1987	Julius Caesar	William Shakespeare	Robert Hossein
1988	The Moods of Marianne	Alfred de Musset	Dominique Ferrier
1990	Woyzeck	Georg Büchner	Daniel Amard
1991	L'Impromptu de Versailles	Molière	Nathalie Chemelny
1992	The Homecoming	Harold Pinter	Claude Lesko
1993	Le Carrosse du Saint-Sacrement	Prosper Mérimée	Nathalie Chemelny (2)
1994-95	L'art seine	Frédéric Bouraly	Frédéric Bouraly (2)
1999	Les voilà dans Le bouche à oreille	Frédéric Bouraly	Frédéric Bouraly (3)
2003-04	La vie de chantier	Dany Boon	Dany Boon
2005	Un jour mon prince viendra	Tatiana Gousseff	Christophe Bouisse
2015	Conseil de famille	Amanda Sthers	Éric Civanyan

== Filmography ==
Year	Title	Role	Director	Notes
1997	À fond la caisse	The cop	Vincent Rivier	Short
1997	Amour, travail, santé...	The journalist	Antoine Lepoivre	Short
1998	Folle d'elle	Alex	Jérôme Cornuau	
1999	Le schpountz	The cop	Gérard Oury	
2000	Happenstance	Bobby	Laurent Firode	
2000	Deuxième quinzaine de juillet	Jean-Jacques	Christophe Reichert	
2000	H		Jean-Luc Moreau	TV series (1 episode)
2002	If I Were a Rich Man	Elvis	Gérard Bitton & Michel Munz	
2002	Vertiges	Fred	Jérôme Cornuau	TV series (1 episode)
2003	Le juge est une femme	Cavazzi	Stéphane Kappes	TV series (2 episodes)
2004	Les parisiens		Claude Lelouch	
2004	Moitié-moitié	Cécé	Laurent Firode	TV movie
2005	Quartier V.I.P.	The waiter	Laurent Firode	
2005	La pomme de Newton	Rodolphe	Laurent Firode	TV movie
2006	La Maison du Bonheur	The doctor	Dany Boon	
2006	The Tiger Brigades	Caby	Jérôme Cornuau	
2006	Comment lui dire	The controller	Laurent Firode	TV movie
2007	Les cerfs-volants	The director	Jérôme Cornuau	TV movie
2008	Les oubliées	Bourgeux	Hervé Hadmar	TV mini-series
2009	Erreur de la banque en votre faveur	Morel	Gérard Bitton & Michel Munz	
2009	À la lune montante	Olivier	Annarita Zambrano	Short
2009	Ce jour là, tout a changé	Goguelat	Arnaud Sélignac	TV series (1 episode)
2009–present	Scènes de ménages	José	Francis Duquet, Varante Soudjian, ...	TV series (3 316 episodes)
2010	Le juge est une femme	Pierre Castro	François Velle	TV series (1 episode)
2011	Le marquis	The detainee	Dominique Farrugia	
2011	Midi et soir	Philippe	Laurent Firode	TV movie
2012	Par amour	Didier	Laurent Firode	
2012	Bonne année !	The cop	Didier Talmone	Short
2013	Blanche nuit	The inner man	Fabrice Sébille	
2013	Le maillot de bain	Jean-Louis	Mathilde Bayle	Short
2013	L'homme du passé	Jenifer's Father	Matt Beurois	Short
2014	A toi mon amour	Lieutenant Joinot	Florent Thomas	Short
2014	Witnesses	Philippe	Hervé Hadmar	TV mini-series
2015	Brigade Spéciale	Marc Dubrueil	Sébastien Kubiak	Short
2015	Ticket gagnant	The man	Elie Nicolas	Short
2015	Mystère à l'Opéra	Maurice Jourdeuil	Léa Fazer	TV movie
2015	Enfin en vacances, à la mer	José	Karim Adda & Francis Duquet	TV movie
2015	Camping paradis	Michel	Philippe Proteau	TV series (1 episode)
2016	Enfin en vacances, à la campagne	José	Karim Adda & Francis Duquet	TV movie
2019	Beaux-parents	Lopez	Héctor Cabello Reyes	

== Dubbing ==
Frédéric Bouraly was the French voice of several characters from animation Movies and TV Series.

Year	Title	Role	Notes
1987	Dragon Ball: Sleeping Princess in Devil's Castle	Lucifer	
1987	Saint Seiya: The Movie	Orpheus	
1989-96	Dragon Ball Z	Vegeta, Mr. Satan, Trunks, Paikuhan, C-16, Dabra	TV series (291 episodes)
1990	Dragon Ball Z: The Tree of Might	Tullece	
1991	Dragon Ball Z: Cooler's Revenge	Coola	
2007-11	SamSam	Marchel 1er, Les Pipiolis, Crapouille	TV series (91 episodes)
2009-15	Dragon Ball Z Kai	Mr. Satan	TV series (159 episodes)
2013	Dragon Ball Z: Battle of Gods	Mr. Satan	
