= L'entraînement du champion avant la course =

1991 film

- Directed by: Bernard Favre
- Written by: Michel Deutsch
- Produced by: Christian Ardan; Paul Giovanni
- Starring: Richard Berry
- Cinematography: Michel Amathieu
- Edited by: Emmanuelle Thibault
- Release date: 5 June 1991
- Running time: 80 minutes
- Country: France
- Language: French

L'entraînement du champion avant la course is a 1991 French drama film directed by Bernard Favre. It was screened in the Un Certain Regard section at the 1991 Cannes Film Festival.

== Cast ==
- Richard Berry - Fabrice
- Valérie Mairesse - Loren
- Mireille Perrier - Liliane
- Jef Odet Sarfaty - Mouloud
- Daniel Milgram - The clerk
- Yvon Back - The neighbor
- Daniel Schenmetzler - The boss
- Raymonde Heudeline - MRS Zablinsky
- Françoise Miquelis - The client
- Hélène Phillipe - The client
- Sylvie Jobert - The wise woman
- Olivier Caillabet
- Pierre-Alain de Garrigues
- Julia Maraval - The elder girl
- Marguerite Mousset - The youngest girl
