= An Air So Pure =

- Film poster
- Directed by: Yves Angelo
- Written by: Yves Angelo; Sandra & Tito Topin; Jean Cosmos
- Based on: Siste Kapitel by Knut Hamsun
- Produced by: Alain Sarde; Pascal Judelewicz; Anne-Dominique Toussaint; Lew Rywin; Christine Gozlan
- Starring: Fabrice Luchini; André Dussollier; Marie Gillain; Yolande Moreau. Andrzej Radziwiłowicz
- Cinematography: Edward Kłosiński; Denis Lenoir
- Edited by: Thierry Derocles
- Music by: Joanna Bruzdowicz
- Production company: France 2 Cinéma
- Distributed by: AMLF
- Release date: 3 September 1997
- Running time: 106 minutes
- Countries: France; Poland
- Language: French
- Budget: $8.1 million
- Box office: $205.000

An Air So Pure or Un air si pur... is a 1997 French comedy-drama film directed by Yves Angelo.

== Plot ==
During World War I, a doctor and a lawyer buy a huge house in a mountain to make both nursing home and resort home. Tenants flock, all of different nationalities, sick or healthy. All invent false identities, to appear to others what they are not, because all dream of a future in which their destiny, tragic or comic, does not allow accomplishment.

== Cast ==
- Fabrice Luchini as Magnus
- André Dussollier as Doctor Boyer
- Marie Gillain as Julie d'Espard
- Yolande Moreau as Laure Surville
- Jacques Boudet as Monsieur Elmer
- Jerzy Radziwiłowicz as Daniel
- Jean-Pierre Lorit as Florent
- Édith Scob as Mademoiselle Sophie
- Krystyna Janda as Madame Leduroy
- Laura Betti as Madame Ruben
- Emmanuelle Laborit as Mathilde
- Grażyna Wolszczak as Milady
- Nicolas Vaude as Simon
- Redjep Mitrovitsa as Moss
- Roberto Della Casa as Monsieur Ruben
- Andrzej Szenajch as Schnitzer

== Accolades ==
Award	Category	Recipient	Result
Montreal World Film Festival	Grand Prix des Amériques	Yves Angelo	Nominated
