= Monsieur (1990 film) =

- Directed by: Jean-Philippe Toussaint
- Screenplay by: Jean-Philippe Toussaint
- Based on: Monsieur by Jean-Philippe Toussaint
- Produced by: Pascal Judelewicz; Anne-Dominique Toussaint
- Starring: Dominic Gould; Wojciech Pszoniak; Eva Ionesco
- Cinematography: Jean-Francois Robin
- Edited by: Sylvie Pontoizeau
- Music by: Olivier Lartigue
- Distributed by: BAC Films
- Release date: 17 January 1990
- Running time: 90 minutes
- Countries: Belgium; France
- Language: French

Monsieur is a 1990 comedy film based on the 1986 novel of the same name by Jean-Philippe Toussaint. It was directed by the novel's author and produced by Pascal Judelewicz and Anne-Dominique Toussaint. The film starred Dominic Gould, Wojciech Pszoniak, and Eva Ionesco. Monsieur was screened at the 1990 Toronto International Film Festival. It received the André Cavens Award for Best Film given by the Belgian Film Critics Association (UCC).

== Cast ==
- Dominic Gould as Monsieur
- Wojciech Pszoniak as Kaltz
- Eva Ionesco as Mrs. Pons-Romanov
- Aziliz Juhel as Anne Bruckhardt
- Jacques Lippe as Parrain
- Jany de Stoppani as Mrs. Parrain
- Alexandra Stewart as Mrs. Dubois-Lacour
- Alexandre von Sivers as Leguen
- Aurelle Doazan as Laurence
