= Héroïnes =

Héroïnes [Can be said Heroin]
- Theatrical release poster
- Directed by: Gérard Krawczyk
- Screenplay by: Gérard Krawczyk; Alain Layrac
- Based on: Play Back by Didier Daeninckx
- Produced by: Alain Terzian
- Starring: Virginie Ledoyen
- Cinematography: Laurent Dailland
- Edited by: Luc Barnier
- Music by: Laurent Alvarez; Maïdi Roth
- Production company: Gaumont
- Distributed by: Gaumont Buena Vista International
- Release date: 27 August 1997
- Running time: 115 minutes
- Country: France
- Language: French
- Box office: $449.000

Héroïnes is a 1997 French drama film directed by Gérard Krawczyk and starring Virginie Ledoyen.

== Plot ==
Two best friends, Johanna and Jeanne, live in the small town of Decazeville, a mining town in France. One year at the Miners' Ball, the music group The Sirens perform, of which Johanna and Jeanne are members.

In a spontaneous moment, a new friend of Johanna's (named Luc) discovers Johanna and Jeanne's incredible musical talent and singing ability when they sing a duet together without musical accompaniment.

The two girls begin practicing and recording in a studio together with the help of Luc and an arranger, Jasper, and finally manage to record a tape with a few songs.

A co-worker of Jeanne's joins their team as Jasper's assistant. Just after Luc leaves for Paris to take the tape around to various record companies, the others spot posters for a music contest, but only single artists may enter, and Johanna is chosen by the group to enter.

She appears on live TV and is an instant hit, but with only one problem: as she begins to perform before the cameras, Jasper cuts out her mike and inserts a recording of Jeanne's voice instead.

Many people except the small group of insiders believe it's Johanna singing, and their lives change from that.

== Cast ==
- Virginie Ledoyen as Johanna
- Maïdi Roth as Jeanne
- Marc Duret as Luc
- Saïd Taghmaoui as JP
- Dominic Gould as Jasper
- Marie Laforêt as Sylvie
- Charlotte de Turckheim as Catherine
- Edouard Baer as Francis
- Serge Reggiani as Montgolfier
- Dominique Besnehard as Eddy
- Marie-Laure Denoyel as Mme Bayol
- Dominique Lagier as Mme Campergue
- François Fehner as Michel
- Neige Dolsky as Mme Laubier
- Gérard Pollet as Philippe
