= Dominic Gould =

French and American actor (born 1964)

- Born: September 19, 1964 (age 61); Los Angeles, California, U.S.
- Occupation: Actor

Dominic Gould (born September 19, 1964) is a French-American actor. He was born in Los Angeles, United States.

== Filmography ==
=== Film ===
- Jeux d'artifices (1987) – Stan
- Hôtel de France (1987) – Manu's Friend
- Monsieur (1990) – Monsieur
- The Man Who Lost His Shadow (L'Homme qui a perdu son ombre) (1991) – Paul
- Un homme et deux femmes (1991) – L'Américan
- Near Mrs. (1992) – Finch, Paris CIA Chief
- Wadeck's Mother's Friend's Son (1992) – Guy
- Iron Horsemen (1994) – Bad Trip
- Beaumarchais the Scoundrel (1996) – Arthur Lee
- The Eighth Day (1996) – le collègue de Harry
- Double Team (1997) – Delta Five
- Héroïnes (1997) – Jasper
- Alissa (1998) – Bodyguard
- A Soldier's Daughter Never Cries (1998) – Poker Player in Paris
- L.A. Without a Map (1998) – Music Store Clerk 1
- The Ice Rink (1998) – Head Key Grip
- The Deep (1999, Short) – Mahoney
- History Is Made at Night (1999) – CIA Agent
- Chili con carne (1999) – Burgerman Steve
- Les Cendres du paradis (2000) – Ivan
- Novo (2002) – Gilles
- Monique (2002) – Paul
- Embrassez qui vous voudrez (2002) – Parasol Man
- The Butterfly (2002) – Le hacker
- The Statement (2003) – Captain Durand
- Immortal (2004) – John (narration)
- L'Antidote (2005) – Andrew
- Marie-Antoinette (2006) – Count
- The Beautiful Person (2008) – Le prof d'Anglais
- Queen to Play (2009) – L'Américain
- Glen:The Flying Robot (2010) – Henry, Egotistical Pianist
- Paris Connections (2010) – Detective Morin
- The Prodigies (2011) – Kilian
- Capital (2012) – Oliver
- The Connection (2014) – John Cusack
- Beyond Metal (2016) – Henry
- Some Like It Veiled (2017) – Masseur aéroport
- À tout à l'heure (2017) – Troisième homme du rêve
- Chacun pour tous (2018) – Owen Gordon

=== Television ===
- L'Amoureuse (1987) – Dick
- The Great Escape II: The Untold Story (1988, TV Movie) – Jules
- The Maid (1990, TV Movie) – Pierre Meyer
- Charlemagne (1993, TV Mini-Series) – Oger
- Rêveuse jeunesse (1994, TV Movie) – British Pilot
- Souhaitez-moi bonne chance (1997, TV Movie) – François
- It's Not About Love (1998, TV Movie) – Bernard
- Jalousie (2001, TV Movie) – Bob
- Commissariat Bastille (2002) – Leroy
- Largo Winch (2002) – Nick
- Close to Leo (2002, TV Movie) – Father
- Le Secret de la belle de Mai, Le (2002, TV Movie) – Klein
- Les Cordier, juge et flic (2002) – Maxime Modier
- La Faux (2003, TV Movie) – Jenkins
- Les Enfants du miracle (2003, TV Movie) – Robert
- Petits mythes urbains (2004) – The Taxi Passenger
- Le Grand Charles (2006, TV Movie) – Roosevelt's interpreter
- Le Bureau des Légendes (2015 - 2017) - Chehlahoui

== Video games ==
- Beyond: Two Souls (2013) – Paul / Earl / Mike
- Detroit: Become Human (2018) – Todd Williams
- Farming Simulator 22 (2022) - As the Farmer and Father in the cinematic trailer.
