= Appropriate Behavior =

2014 film by Desiree Akhavan

- Theatrical release poster
- Directed by: Desiree Akhavan
- Written by: Desiree Akhavan
- Produced by: Cecilia Frugiuele
- Starring: Desiree Akhavan; Rebecca Henderson; Halley Feiffer; Scott Adsit; Arian Moayed; Anh Duong; Hooman Majd; Aimee Mullins; Chris Baker; Robin Rikoon; Kelly McAndrew
- Cinematography: Christopher Teague
- Edited by: Sara Shaw
- Music by: Josephine Wiggs
- Production company: Parkville Pictures
- Distributed by: Gravitas Ventures (United States); Peccadillo Pictures (United Kingdom)
- Release dates: January 18, 2014 (Sundance); January 16, 2015 (United States); March 6, 2015 (United Kingdom)
- Running time: 90 minutes
- Countries: United States; United Kingdom
- Language: English
- Box office: $123,699

Appropriate Behavior is a 2014 romantic comedy-drama film written and directed by Desiree Akhavan in her feature directorial debut. A co-production between the United States and the United Kingdom, the film stars Akhavan as Shirin, a bisexual Persian American woman in Brooklyn struggling to rebuild her life after breaking up with her girlfriend Maxine (Rebecca Henderson). The cast also includes Scott Adsit, Halley Feiffer, Anh Duong, Hooman Majd, Arian Moayed and Aimee Mullins.

The film premiered at the Sundance Film Festival on January 18, 2014. It was released in the United States on January 16, 2015, by Gravitas Ventures and in the United Kingdom on March 6, 2015, by Peccadillo Pictures.

== Plot ==
Shirin, a young bisexual woman and the daughter of wealthy Persian immigrants, moves out of the Park Slope apartment she shared with her girlfriend Maxine after they break up. Flashbacks reveal that Maxine, who is a lesbian and estranged from her family, resented Shirin's reluctance to come out to her traditional parents, while Shirin felt pressured to live up to Maxine's expectations. After a birthday party for Maxine, the two women broke up following a heated argument over their contrasting worldviews, with Maxine accusing Shirin of having a codependent relationship with her parents, calling her a "closet case", and dismissing her bisexuality as a phase.

Shortly after the breakup, Shirin confesses to her best friend Crystal that she wants Maxine back, and Crystal encourages Shirin to move on. Shirin's parents are confused as to why Shirin moved out of her old apartment as they are unaware that Shirin is bisexual and was in a relationship with a woman. Determined to get her life back on track, Shirin moves into an apartment with odd roommates, takes a job teaching filmmaking to five-year-old children at a Park Slope school, and unsuccessfully attempts to restart her dating life.

One day, Shirin follows Maxine to a feminist discussion group. After Maxine rebuffs Shirin's attempts to talk, Shirin impulsively invites the group leader, Sasha, out on a date. Shirin and Sasha go out for drinks at a bar, and after Sasha leaves, Shirin meets a couple, Ted and Marie, who invite her into their apartment for a threesome. Shirin struggles to connect with Ted but instantly bonds with Marie, making Ted feel left out. Marie expresses a desire to see Shirin again, but Shirin, feeling unconfortable, leaves.

While attending a party with a tattooed man, Shirin encounters Maxine and is upset to learn that she is dating Tibet, a fellow teacher at the school where Shirin works. In the restroom, Maxine assures a forlorn Shirin that she is not trying to replace her with Tibet and advises her to take a cab home. Shirin devotes herself to her job and finally comes out to her older brother, who is mostly supportive, and her mother, who is in denial.

On the subway, Shirin tells Crystal that she again plans to bring up the issue of her sexuality with her mother in a month. She spots Maxine outside the subway car on the platform and the two women wave to one another.

== Cast ==
- Desiree Akhavan as Shirin
- Rebecca Henderson as Maxine
- Halley Feiffer as Crystal
- Ryan Fitzsimmons as Brendan
- Anh Duong as Nasrin
- Hooman Majd as Mehrdad
- Arian Moayed as Ali
- Justine Cotsonas as Layli
- Scott Adsit as Ken
- Aimee Mullins as Sasha
- Rosalie Lowe as Tibet
- Chris Baker as Ted
- Robyn Rikoon as Marie

== Reception ==
On the review aggregator website Rotten Tomatoes, the film holds an approval rating of 97% based on 62 reviews, with an average rating of 7.2/10. The website's critics consensus reads, "Warm, funny, and quietly profound, Appropriate Behavior serves as a thoroughly compelling calling card for writer, director, and star Desiree Akhavan." Metacritic, which uses a weighted average, assigned the film a score of 73 out of 100, based on 19 critics, indicating "generally favorable" reviews.

David Rooney in his review for The Hollywood Reporter praised the film by saying, "The promise of fresh cultural perspectives gives way to a more amorphous slice of contemporary romantic angst comedy." Ryan Gilbey wrote in the New Statesman that Akhavan is "a whiz [sic] at writing characters whose life seems to extend beyond their brief screentime." Katie Walsh of IndieWire gave the film a grade of B+, saying, "Funny, unique, and entirely inappropriate, Appropriate Behavior is a supremely satisfying and irreverent take on the New York rom-com."

=== Accolades ===
Year	Group/Award	Category	Recipient	Result	Ref.
2014	30th Independent Spirit Awards	Best First Screenplay	Desiree Akhavan	Nominated	
2014	San Diego Asian Film Festival	Grand Jury Prize	Desiree Akhavan	Won	
