= Golem, the Spirit of the Exile =

- Directed by: Amos Gitai
- Cinematography: Henri Alekan
- Music by: Simon Stockhausen; Markus Stockhausen
- Release date: 1992
- Countries: Italy; France; Germany; United Kingdom; Netherlands

Golem, the Spirit of the Exile (French: Golem, l'esprit de l'exil, Italian: Golem, Lo spirito dell'esilio, also known as Golem, the Ghost of Exile) is a 1992 drama film directed by Amos Gitai. It is a European co-production between Germany, Netherlands, United Kingdom, France and Italy.

Following Esther and Berlin - Jerusalem, the film is the third chapter in the Gitai's "Exile" trilogy; it is also the middle chapter in the director's Golem trilogy, between Birth of a Golem and Golem, le jardin pétrifié.

== Cast ==
- Hanna Schygulla as the Spirit of the Exile
- Vittorio Mezzogiorno as the Maharal
- Ophrah Shemesh as Naomi
- Samuel Fuller as Elimelek
- Mireille Perrier as Ruth
- Sotigui Kouyaté as Boaz
- Fabienne Babe as Orpa
- Bakary Sangaré as the first marine
- Alain Maratrat as the second marine
- Marceline Loridan Ivens as the Mother of Opra
- Bernardo Bertolucci as the master of the court
- Philippe Garrel as Opra's fiancé
- Marisa Paredes as the Mistress of Ceremony
