= The Repentant (2002 film) =

2002 film by Laetitia Masson

- Theatrical release poster
- French: La Repentie
- Directed by: Laetitia Masson
- Screenplay by: Laetitia Masson
- Based on: La Repentie by Didier Daeninckx
- Produced by: Michèle Pétin; Laurent Pétin
- Starring: Isabelle Adjani; Sami Frey; Samy Naceri
- Cinematography: Antoine Héberlé; Georges Diane
- Edited by: Dominique Faysse
- Music by: Jocelyn Pook
- Production companies: ARP Sélection; France 3 Cinéma
- Distributed by: ARP Sélection
- Release date: 17 April 2002 (France)
- Running time: 125 minutes
- Country: France
- Language: French
- Budget: $8.5 million
- Box office: $655,465

The Repentant (French: La Repentie) is a 2002 French romantic thriller film written and directed by Laetitia Masson, and loosely based on the 1999 novella La Repentie by Didier Daeninckx. It stars Isabelle Adjani and marked her return to the screen after four years. With supporting roles by Sami Frey and Samy Naceri, Adjani portrays a woman who tries to escape her criminal past. It was released by ARP Sélection on 17 April 2002.

== Plot ==
A young woman retrieves a suitcase from the station depot, enters a bathroom, and emerges wearing an elegant dress and black sunglasses. She purchases a ticket for the first train to the sea, which is bound for Nice. A young man named Karim follows her and inquires about the train's direction from the conductor. The story then poses the question: Can a woman truly start a new life with another man, Paul Viard, when her past continues to haunt her?

== Cast ==
- Isabelle Adjani as Charlotte / Leïla
- Sami Frey as Paul Viard
- Samy Naceri as Karim
- Aurore Clément as Blonde woman
- Catherine Mouchet as Alice, the chambermaid
- Maria Schneider as Charlotte's sister
- Jacques Bonnaffé as Joseph
- Jean-François Stévenin as Man at party
- Isild Le Besco as Young prostitute
- José Giovanni as Charlotte's father
- Christian Aaron Boulogne as Man at wedding
- Thierry Rode as Hotel Negresco manager
- Claudine Mavros as Paul's mother
- Georges Mavros as Paul's father
- Farida Amrouche as Charlotte's mother

== Production ==
Laetitia Masson was approached by producers looking for a vehicle to mark Isabelle Adjani's return to the screen. Adjani had established herself as a leading star of French cinema in the 1980s. However, her last appearance was a minor role in Paparazzi (1998), in which she played herself. Her last leading role was starring opposite Sharon Stone in Diabolique (1996), a remake of Les Diaboliques. In The Repentant, Masson uses Adjani as her femme fatale and incorporates themes of mystery and impulsiveness to illustrate the feeling of starting anew.

Principal photography began on 21 May 2001, with filming taking place in Paris, the Île-de-France region, Nice and Morocco. It lasted 10 weeks.

== Reception ==
=== Box office ===
The film was a modest box-office success in France, selling 85,238 admissions from 138 screens in its first week. At the end of its theatrical run, it sold a total of 137,127 admissions.

=== Critical response ===
The Repentant received an average rating of 2.7 out of 5 stars on the French website AlloCiné, based on 21 reviews.

Olivier De Bruyn, writing for Première, assessed it as a "hybrid film: absolutely fascinating but a bit frustrating". Gérard Lefort of Libération deemed it a film of "imperceptibility" whose best scenes were those of insignificance. Michel Guilloux of L'Humanité wrote that the film accumulated clichés and the plot quickly revealed itself empty, to the point of boring the audience. Les Echos's Annie Coppermann concurred, saying it rendered the audience vaguely bored but admiring the landscapes and faces of Adjani and Frey, and ultimately hoping for a proper return to film for Adjani. François Gorin of Télérama similarly called it a mess filled with emptiness, but also "impossible to hate".

Screen International's Patrick Frater criticized the lack of a deeper examination into the film's themes of "starting over and inventing a past". Frater, however, praised both the "sumptuous" cinematography and Jocelyn Pook's score for lifting the film "above the mean".
