= Boy Meets Girl (1984 film) =

- Theatrical release poster
- Directed by: Leos Carax
- Written by: Leos Carax
- Produced by: Patricia Moraz
- Starring: Denis Lavant; Mireille Perrier
- Cinematography: Jean-Yves Escoffier
- Edited by: Nelly Meunier
- Music by: Jacques Pinault
- Production company: Abilèneh
- Distributed by: Cinecom Pictures
- Release dates: May 1984 (Critics' Week); 21 November 1984
- Running time: 104 minutes
- Country: France
- Language: French
- Box office: 131,042 admissions

Boy Meets Girl is a 1984 French romantic drama film written and directed by Leos Carax in his feature directorial debut. The plot follows the relationship between an aspiring filmmaker (Denis Lavant), who has just been left by his lover, and a suicidal young woman (Mireille Perrier), also reeling from a failed romance.

== Plot ==
Alex, a jaded young man in Paris, has been abandoned by his girlfriend Florence for his friend Thomas. He now lives alone in a small room with few possessions. He is soon to enter military service (as revealed in an outrageous telephone conversation with his father). A springtime heat wave exacerbates his restlessness.

Mireille and Bernard are a second young couple with a dysfunctional relationship. When Bernard leaves their apartment one night, and then uses the intercom to ask Mireille a favor, they end up having an intimate conversation which is audible to Alex, who happened to be passing in the street. Alex follows Bernard to a bar, and later retrieves a piece of paper that Bernard drops. This proves to be a party invitation. Back at the apartment, Mireille appears to be on the verge of committing suicide. Defeating the urge, she practices a tap-dancing routine, intercut with Alex wandering the streets, listening to his portable tape deck.

Alex writes a farewell letter to Florence, and shoplifts some records as a gift. Delivering these to her new address, he is almost caught in the hallway by Florence, who is in the middle of having sex with Thomas. Leaving the building undetected, he proceeds to the party to which Bernard and Mireille were invited. Bernard is observed leaving early, but Mireille remains, and Alex attempts to strike up a conversation with her (after lying to the hostess that he is a friend of Bernard's, and being introduced to the other guests accordingly).

Alex borrows the telephone to ascertain Florence's receipt of his note, and then stumbles across Mireille in a bathroom holding a scissors blade to her wrist. He quickly retreats to the kitchen, where the hostess explains to him that the party is to commemorate the death of her brother, with whom she shared a telepathic bond. Mireille enters quietly, having cut her hair short, to the shock of the hostess. Alex and Mireille, left alone, discuss their histories and ambitions; Alex claims to be an aspiring filmmaker, though he has gone no further than come up with titles, whereas Mireille was lured to the city in hopes of acting or modeling, but never caught a break. Alex makes a rambling profession of love, but Mireille does not encourage him, beyond accompanying him partway to the train station where he will embark on his military career.

Alex leaves the train on the pretense of finding a restroom, but winds up playing pinball at the bar, and the train leaves without him. He phones Mireille from a telephone booth, having gleaned her number from the hostess' address book, but she does not answer. He hurries to her apartment, finds the door unlocked, sees her seated in the living room, and embraces her from behind. To his shock, she collapses, bleeding at the mouth. A flashback reveals that she had once again been holding a pair of scissors to her wrist. When Alex entered, she assumed it was Bernard, and hastily concealed the scissors beneath her clothes. When Alex embraced her, the blades inflicted a presumably fatal wound.

== Cast ==
- Denis Lavant as Alex
- Mireille Perrier as Mireille
- Carroll Brooks as Helen
- Maïté Nahyr as Maïte
- Anna Baldaccini as Florence
- Dominique Reymond as The neighbor

== Release ==
Boy Meets Girl premiered via International Critics' Week, an independent parallel section to the Cannes Film Festival.

The film was released in France on 21 November 1984, where it amassed a total of 131,042 admissions.

== Reception ==
On Rotten Tomatoes, it has a 100% score based on 11 reviews, with an average rating of 8.1/10. Vincent Canby of The New York Times said: "Mr. Carax is 24, but Boy Meets Girl looks like the work of a talented 18-year-old, someone who still spends more time inside the Cinematheque Francaise than outside it. ... In Boy Meets Girl, one recognizes a bit of Jean-Luc Godard here, something of Francois Truffaut there, and every now and then one hears what may be the faint, original voice of Mr. Carax trying to make himself heard around and through the images of others." Canby added however that "Boy Meets Girl has been handsomely photographed (by Jean-Yves Escoffier) in black-and-white images that look as velvety smooth as fudge sauce atop vanilla ice cream. The performances are perfectly decent -Miss Perrier is especially good in a long Godardian monologue. What's still missing is the film maker's own idiosyncratic personality, which, if it exists, could surface in Mr. Carax's next film."
