= Happenstance (film) =

- Theatrical release poster
- Directed by: Laurent Firode
- Written by: Laurent Firode
- Produced by: Franck Landron; Anne-Dominique Toussaint; Pascal Judelewicz
- Starring: Audrey Tautou
- Cinematography: Jean-René Duveau
- Edited by: Didier Rantz
- Music by: Peter Chase
- Distributed by: Les Films des Tournelles
- Release date: 21 June 2000
- Running time: 97 min.
- Country: France
- Language: French

Happenstance is a 2000 French film directed by Laurent Firode and starring Audrey Tautou and Faudel. The film is also known as The Beating of the Butterfly's Wings, a literal translation of its original French title, Le battement d'ailes du papillon. The title references the butterfly effect from chaos theory which is quoted at greater length by one of the characters in the film.

== Synopsis ==
Audrey Tautou plays shop assistant Irène, who on the way to work takes a seat on the Paris metro opposite an older woman who tries to interview her for a marketing survey. On hearing that Irène's birthdate is 11 March 1977, the woman reads her horoscope: today she'll meet her true love, but she must be patient. After she leaves the metro, a young man sitting alongside (Faudel) tells the older woman he was born on the same day and asks her to read the rest of the horoscope.

The film then traces a range of characters of diverse ages, ethnicities and social status whose daily lives intersect with Irène and Faudel's in a variety of ways and come together at the end of the day. Seemingly trivial events—such as the throwing of stones or a shoe, the theft of a coffeemaker, a pigeon's consumption of a macaroon—determine the decisions and lives of the many characters.

== Cast ==
- Audrey Tautou : Irène
- Faudel : Younès
- Éric Savin : Richard
- Frédéric Bouraly : Bobby
- Françoise Bertin : Luc's Grandmother
- Pierre Bellemare : Taxi Driver

== Commentary ==
The film relies heavily on the notion of chance and happenstance interacting in unpredictable ways on people's lives. It is a film whose action/plot appears heavily driven by the underlying chaos theory that gives the French film its title.
