= Quartier V.I.P. =

- Directed by: Laurent Firode
- Written by: Jean-Marie Chevret; Laurent Firode
- Produced by: Martine de Clermont-Tonnerre
- Starring: Johnny Hallyday; Pascal Légitimus; Valeria Bruni Tedeschi; François Berléand; Catherine Jacob
- Cinematography: Bruno Romiguière
- Edited by: Didier Ranz
- Music by: Yvan Cassar
- Production companies: StudioCanal; TF1 Films Production
- Distributed by: Quinta Communications
- Release date: 25 May 2005
- Running time: 99 minutes
- Country: France
- Language: French
- Budget: $4.5 million
- Box office: $400.000

Quartier V.I.P. is a 2005 French comedy film directed by Laurent Firode.

== Plot ==
Guardian of Health, Alex leads a quiet life with his wife Louisette and his colleague and friend René. Transferred to the district "VIP", he was offered by one of the detainees, Bertrand, a businessman convicted of fraudulent business, a strange deal: Claire, Bertrand's wife who decided to separate a husband become cumbersome while enjoying his fortune, Alex will be responsible to approach it.

Alex will offer him a tempting but phony financial deal that enables Bertrand to get his money. Eager to put a little spice in his life, Alex agrees to play the game and behave during his evenings and discreet Swiss businessman! Claire is seduced and even more: she falls in love.

Bertrand quickly realizes that Alex is really interested in his wife, Claire discovers the deception and financial Louisette spousal betrayal. But Bertrand shows good sport, Louisette consoles himself with René. Claire, tired of artificial life, a new life with Alex ...

== Cast ==
- Johnny Hallyday as Alex
- Pascal Légitimus as René
- Valeria Bruni Tedeschi as Claire
- François Berléand as Bertrand Fussac
- Catherine Jacob as Louisette
- Jean-Claude Brialy as Ferdinand
- Bruno Lochet as Michaud
- Philippe Duquesne as Prison's director
- Jacky Nercessian as Émile
- Bernard Blancan as A Prisoner
- Eric Savin as Tony
- Lysiane Meis as Joyce
- Husky Kihal as Michel
- Michaël Moyon as Toufik
- Thierry Desroses as Dieuleveut
- Frédéric Bouraly as The waiter
