= Boston Society of Film Critics Awards 2001 =

Annual US film awards ceremony

22nd BSFC Awards

December 16, 2001

Best Film:
Mulholland Drive

The 22nd Boston Society of Film Critics Awards, honoring the best in film in 2001, were given on 16 December 2001.

== Winners ==
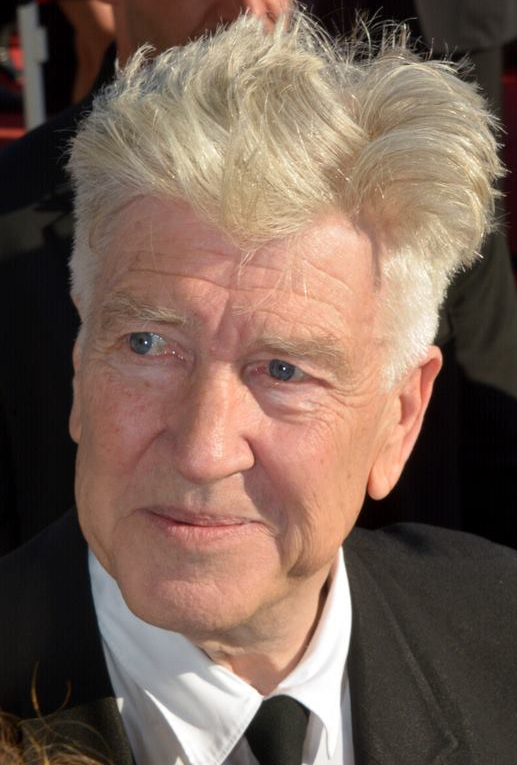
David Lynch, Best Director winner

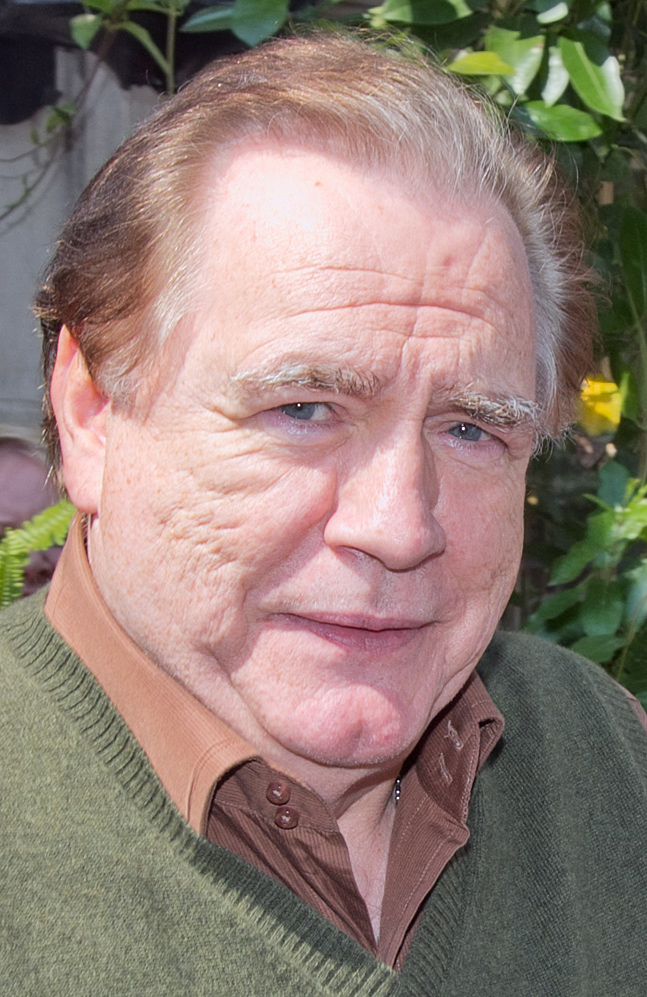
Brian Cox, Best Actor co-winner

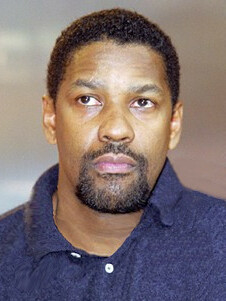
Denzel Washington, Best Actor co-winner

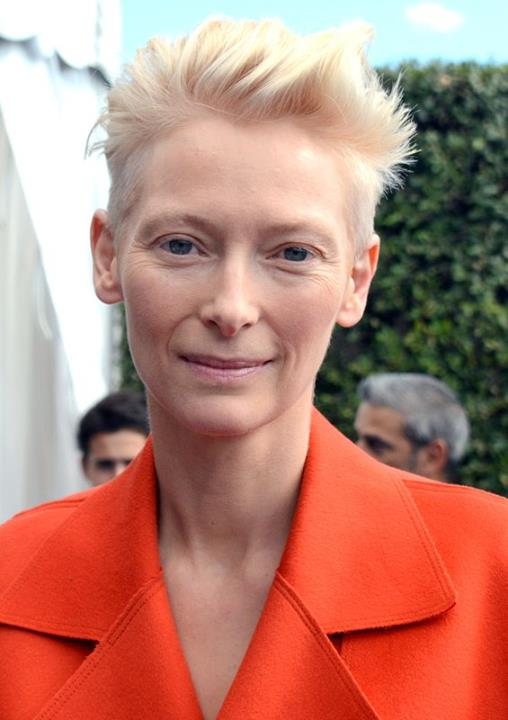
Tilda Swinton, Best Actress winner

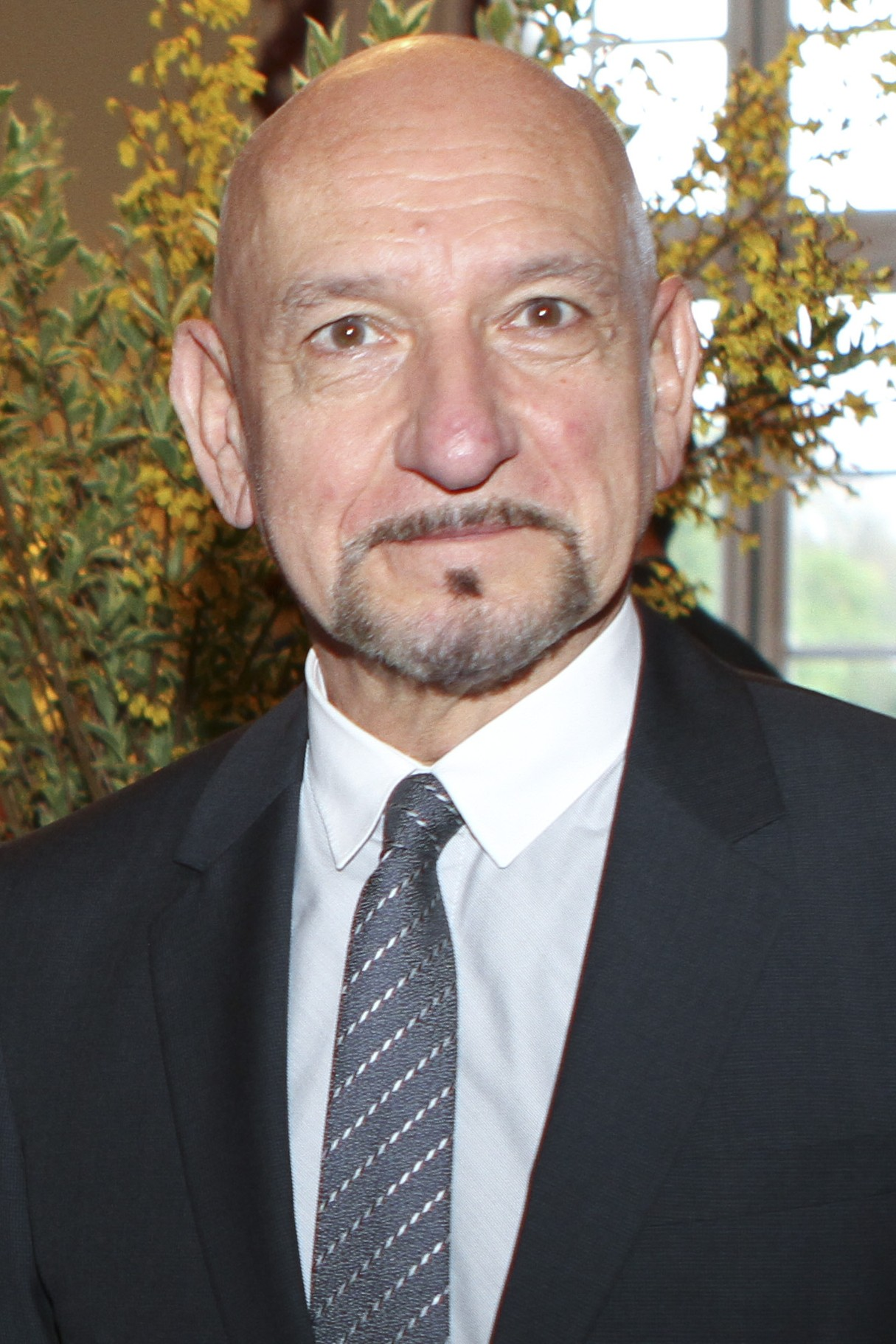
Ben Kingsley, Best Supporting Actor winner

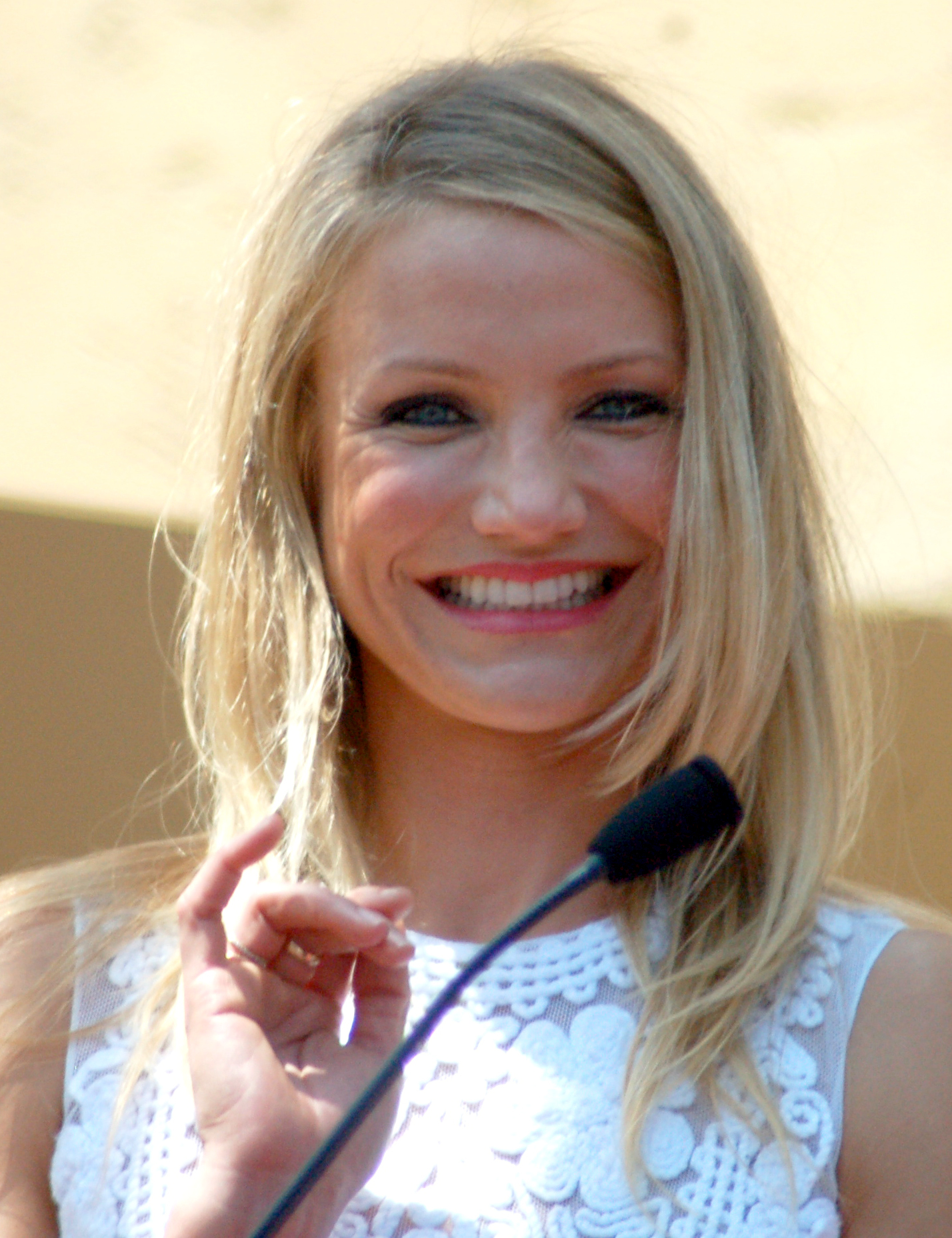
Cameron Diaz, Best Supporting Actress winner

- Best Film:
  - Mulholland Drive
  - Runner-up: Apocalypse Now Redux
- Best Actor (TIE):
  - Brian Cox – L.I.E.
  - Denzel Washington – Training Day
  - Runner-up (TIE): Guy Pearce – Memento and Gene Hackman – The Royal Tenenbaums
- Best Actress:
  - Tilda Swinton – The Deep End
  - Runner-up: Naomi Watts – Mulholland Drive
- Best Supporting Actor:
  - Ben Kingsley – Sexy Beast
  - Runner-up: Steve Buscemi – Ghost World
- Best Supporting Actress:
  - Cameron Diaz – Vanilla Sky
  - Runner-up: Scarlett Johansson – Ghost World
- Best Director:
  - David Lynch – Mulholland Drive
  - Runner-up: Peter Jackson – The Lord of the Rings: The Fellowship of the Ring
- Best Screenplay:
  - Christopher Nolan – Memento
  - Runner-up: Terry Zwigoff and Daniel Clowes – Ghost World
- Best Cinematography:
  - Roger Deakins – The Man Who Wasn't There
  - Runner-up: Christopher Doyle and Mark Lee Ping-bing – In the Mood for Love (Fa yeung nin wa)
- Best Documentary:
  - The Gleaners and I (Les glaneurs et la glaneuse)
- Best Foreign-Language Film:
  - Amores perros • Mexico
  - Runner-up: In the Mood for Love (Fa yeung nin wa) • Hong Kong/France
- Best New Filmmaker:
  - Michael Cuesta – L.I.E.
  - Runner-up: Alejandro González Iñárritu – Amores perros
