= Apocalypse Now Redux =

2001 extended version of Apocalypse Now directed by Francis Ford Coppola

- Theatrical release poster
- Directed by: Francis Ford Coppola
- Written by: John Milius; Francis Ford Coppola
- Narration by: Michael Herr
- Produced by: Francis Ford Coppola; Kim Aubry
- Starring: Marlon Brando; Robert Duvall; Martin Sheen; Frederic Forrest; Albert Hall; Sam Bottoms; Laurence Fishburne; Christian Marquand; Aurore Clément; Harrison Ford; Dennis Hopper
- Cinematography: Vittorio Storaro
- Edited by: Richard Marks; Walter Murch; Gerald B. Greenberg; Lisa Fruchtman
- Music by: Carmine Coppola; Francis Ford Coppola
- Production company: American Zoetrope
- Distributed by: Miramax Films (North and Latin America, United Kingdom and Italy); StudioCanal (International)
- Release dates: May 11, 2001 (Cannes); August 3, 2001 (United States)
- Running time: 202 minutes
- Country: United States
- Languages: English; French; Vietnamese; Khmer; Spanish
- Box office: $12.5 million

Apocalypse Now Redux is a 2001 American extended version of Francis Ford Coppola's 1979 film Apocalypse Now. Coppola, along with editor and longtime collaborator Walter Murch, added 49 minutes of material that had been removed from the initial theatrical release. It is a significant re-edit of the original version. The cut premiered at the 2001 Cannes Film Festival on May 11, 2001 and was released on August 3, 2001 by Miramax Films.

== Production ==
Francis Ford Coppola began production on the new cut with working-partner Kim Aubry. Coppola then tried to get Murch, who was reluctant at first. He thought it would be extremely difficult recutting a film that had taken two years to edit originally. He later changed his mind (after working on the reconstruction of Orson Welles' Touch of Evil). Coppola and Murch then examined several of the rough prints and dailies for the film. It was decided early on that the editing of the film would be like editing a new film altogether. One such example was the new French plantation sequence. The scenes were greatly edited to fit into the movie originally, only to be cut out in the end. When working again on the film, instead of using the heavily edited version, Murch decided to work the scene all over again, editing it as if for the first time.

Much work needed to be done to the new scenes. Due to the off-screen noises during the shoot, most of the dialogue was impossible to hear. During post-production of the film the actors were brought back to re-record their lines (known as A.D.R. or dubbing). This was done for the scenes that made it into the original cut, but not for the deleted scenes. For the Redux version, Martin Sheen, Robert Duvall, Sam Bottoms, Albert Hall, Frederic Forrest, and Aurore Clément were brought back to record ADR for the new scenes.

=== Music ===
New music was recreated and recorded for the remade film by San Francisco Bay Area-based composer Ed Goldfarb, specifically the added tracks "Clean's Funeral" and "Love Theme". For example, it was thought no music had been composed for Willard and Roxanne's romantic interlude in the French Plantation scene. To make matters worse, composer Carmine Coppola had died in 1991. However, the old recording and musical scores were checked and a track titled "Love Theme" was found. During scoring, Francis Coppola had told Carmine, his father, to write a theme for the scene before it was ultimately deleted. For the remake, the track was recorded by a group of synthesists.

=== Cinematography ===
Vittorio Storaro also returned from Italy to head the development of a new color balance of the film and new scenes. When Redux was being released, Storaro learned that a Technicolor dye-transfer process was being brought back. The dye-transfer is a three-strip process that makes the color highly saturated and has consistent black tone. Storaro wished to use this on Redux, but in order to do it, he needed to cut the original negative of Apocalypse Now, leaving Apocalypse Now Redux the only version available. Storaro decided to do it, when convinced by Coppola that this version would be the one that would be remembered.

== New scenes and alterations ==
The film contains several alterations and entire scenes that were cut from the original version. The longest section of added footage in the Redux version is a "French Plantation" sequence, in which the Americans encounter an extended French family operating a rubber plantation, holdovers from French colonization. The scene also includes Coppola's two sons Gian-Carlo and Roman, appearing as children of the family. Around the dinner table, the French family patriarchs argue about the positive side of colonialism in Indochina and the failures at the Battle of Điện Biên Phủ. A young French child recites a poem by Charles Baudelaire entitled L'albatros. The father, Hubert de Marais, played by Christian Marquand, tells Willard that the US created the Viet Cong, to fend off Japanese invaders. A notable line in the dialog is when Hubert describes why they are still here, saying: "When you ask me why we want to stay here, Captain… we want to stay here because it’s ours. It belongs to us. It keeps our family together. I mean, we fight for that. While you Americans… you are fighting for the biggest nothing in history."

Willard and a young woman of the family who has been widowed, played by Aurore Clément, are attracted to each other. Later she fixes him a pipe of opium and shares her bed with him - the only sex scene in what was previously a war movie.

Other added material includes extra combat footage before Willard meets Kilgore, a scene in which Willard's team steals Kilgore's surfboard (which sheds some light on the hunt for the mangoes), a follow-up scene to the dance of the Playboy Playmates, in which Willard's team finds the Playmates stranded after their helicopter has run out of fuel (trading two barrels of fuel for two hours with the Bunnies), and a scene of Kurtz reading from a Time magazine article about the war, surrounded by Cambodian children.

A deleted scene titled "Monkey Sampan" shows Willard and the PBR crew suspiciously eyeing an approaching sampan juxtaposed to Montagnard villagers joyfully singing "Light My Fire" by The Doors. As the sampan gets closer, Willard realizes there are monkeys on it and no helmsman. Finally, just as the two boats pass, the wind turns the sail and exposes a naked dead Viet Cong nailed to the sail boom. His body is mutilated and looks as though the man had been flogged and castrated. The singing stops. As they pass on by, Chief notes out loud, "That's comin' from where we goin', Captain." The boat then slowly passes the giant tail of a shot down B-52 bomber as the noise of engines high in the sky is heard. Coppola said that he made up for cutting this scene by having the PBR pass under an aircraft tail in the final release.

== Cast ==
- Christian Marquand as Hubert de Marais
- Aurore Clément as Roxanne Sarrault
- Roman Coppola as Francis de Marais
- Gian-Carlo Coppola as Gilles de Marais
- Michel Pitton as Philippe de Marais
- Franck Villard as Gaston de Marais
- David Olivier as Christian de Marais
- Chrystel Le Pelletier as Claudine
- Robert Julian as The Tutor
- Yvon Le Saux as Sgt. Le Fevre
- Henri Sadardiel as French soldier #1
- Gilbert Renkens as French soldier #2

== Reception ==
Apocalypse Now Redux originally premiered at the 2001 Cannes Film Festival. The screening marked the anniversary of the original Apocalypse Now screening as a work in progress, where it won the Palme d'Or. Coppola went to the festival, accompanied by Murch, Storaro, production designer Dean Tavoularis, producer Kim Aubry and actors Bottoms and Clément.

=== Box office ===
The film was given a limited release in the United States on August 3, 2001, and was also released theatrically around the world in some countries, grossing $4.6 million in the United States and Canada, and $7.9 million in other territories, for a worldwide total of $12.5 million.

=== Critical response ===
On review aggregator Rotten Tomatoes, the film holds a 93% rating based on 98 reviews, with an average rating of 7.80/10. The website's critics consensus reads, "The additional footage slows down the movie somewhat (some say the new cut is inferior to the original), but Apocalypse Now Redux is still a great piece of cinema." Metacritic, which uses a weighted average, assigned the film a score of 92 out of 100 based on 39 critics. Some critics thought highly of the additions, such as A. O. Scott of The New York Times, who wrote that it "grows richer and stranger with each viewing, and the restoration of scenes left in the cutting room two decades ago has only added to its sublimity."

Some critics, however, thought the new scenes slowed the pacing and were too lengthy (notably the French plantation sequence) and added nothing overall to the film's impact. Owen Gleiberman wrote "Apocalypse Now Redux is the meandering, indulgent art project that [Francis Ford Coppola] was still enough of a craftsman, in 1979, to avoid." Despite this, other critics still gave it high ratings. Roger Ebert wrote: "Longer or shorter, redux or not, Apocalypse Now is one of the central events of my life as a filmgoer." Anthony Lane wrote, "if you have never watched Apocalypse Now in any form; if you know it well and wish to bend your Jesuitical attention to the latest addenda; if you have grown to love it on scrumbled videotape but failed to catch it on the big screen; if you were out of your head during a pre-dawn college screening, duly noted the movie as a trip, and find yourself unable to remember whether the trip in question was Coppola's, America's, or yours; in short, however relevant or rocky your relations with this film—see it now."

=== Accolades ===
Award	Year	Nominated work	Category	Result	Ref.
Boston Society of Film Critics Awards	2001	Apocalypse Now Redux	Best Film	Runner-up	
Taurus World Stunt Awards	2002	Kerry Rossall, Steve Boyum	Best Water Work	Nominated	
Taurus World Stunt Awards	2002	Terry Leonard, Chuck Waters	Best High Work	Nominated	
Taurus World Stunt Awards	2002	Dick White, J. David Jones	Best Aerial Work	Nominated	
Taurus World Stunt Awards	2002	Kerry Rossall, Joe Finnegan, Terry Leonard, Steve Boyum	Best Work With a Vehicle	Nominated	
Taurus World Stunt Awards	2002	Terry Leonard, Kerry Rossall, Steve Boyum, Joe Finnegan	Best Fire Stunt	Nominated	
Taurus World Stunt Awards	2002	Terry Leonard	Best Stunt Coordinator and/or 2nd Unit Director: Sequence	Nominated	
Taurus World Stunt Awards	2002	Terry Leonard	Best Stunt Coordinator and/or 2nd Unit Director: Feature Film	Nominated	

== Soundtrack ==
A soundtrack was released on July 31, 2001, by Nonesuch. The soundtrack contains most of the original tracks (remastered), as well as some for the new scenes ("Clean's Funeral", "Love Theme"). The score was composed by Carmine and Francis Ford Coppola (with some tracks co-composed by Mickey Hart and Richard Hansen). The first track is an abridged version of The Doors' "The End".
