= For Sale (1998 film) =

1998 film

- Film poster
- Directed by: Laetitia Masson
- Written by: Laetitia Masson
- Produced by: Nicolas Daguet
- Starring: Sandrine Kiberlain
- Cinematography: Antoine Héberlé
- Edited by: Aïlo Auguste-Judith
- Release date: 26 August 1998
- Running time: 100 minutes
- Country: France
- Language: French
- Budget: $2.7 million
- Box office: $2.8 million

For Sale (French: À vendre) is a 1998 French drama film directed by Laetitia Masson. It was screened in the Un Certain Regard section at the 1998 Cannes Film Festival.

== Cast ==
- Sandrine Kiberlain - France Robert
- Sergio Castellitto - Luigi Primo
- Jean-François Stévenin - Pierre Lindien
- Aurore Clément - Alice
- Chiara Mastroianni - Mireille
- Mireille Perrier - Primo's Ex-Wife
- Samuel Le Bihan - Eric Pacard
- Caroline Baehr - Marie-Pierre Chénu
- Roschdy Zem - The Banker
- Frédéric Pierrot - Man in the couple
- Didier Flamand
- Louis-Do de Lencquesaing
