= The Ice Rink =

- Theatrical release poster
- Directed by: Jean-Philippe Toussaint
- Screenplay by: Jean-Philippe Toussaint
- Produced by: Anne-Dominique Toussaint
- Starring: Tom Novembre; Mireille Perrier; Dolores Chaplin; Marie-France Pisier; Jean-Pierre Cassel; Gilbert Melki; Bruce Campbell
- Production companies: Les Films des Tournelles; StudioCanal+ Les Films de l'Etang; RTL TVI; Fandango
- Release date: 1998
- Running time: 87 minutes
- Countries: France; Italy; Belgium
- Language: French

The Ice Rink (French: La Patinoire) is a 1998 comedy film written and directed by Jean-Philippe Toussaint. It stars Tom Novembre, Mireille Perrier, Dolores Chaplin, Marie-France Pisier, Jean-Pierre Cassel, Gilbert Melki, and Bruce Campbell.

== Cast ==
- Tom Novembre as Director
- Mireille Perrier as Assistant
- Marie-France Pisier as Producer
- Bruce Campbell as Actor
- Dolores Chaplin as Actress
- Jean-Pierre Cassel as Ice Rink's Manager
- Gilbert Melki as Stand-in for Actress

== Production ==
The film was shot in Franconville, a suburb of Paris, France.

== Reception ==
Stephen Holden of The New York Times wrote of the film: "If its pieces don't completely fit, The Ice Rink has sophisticated comic performances by a cast who know their characters well enough to make us like them in spite of their self-absorption."

== See also ==
- List of films about ice hockey
