= Jean-François Jonvelle =

French photographer (1943–2002)

Jean-François Jonvelle (French pronunciation: [ʒɑ̃ fʁɑ̃swa ʒɔ̃vɛl]; 3 October 1943 – 16 January 2002) was a French photographer of fashion, glamour, and portraiture.

Jonvelle was born on 3 October 1943, in Cavaillon. He apprenticed under Richard Avedon at age 18. As a photographer, he primarily photographed actresses, as well as nude women. In spring 1981, he photographed for an advertiser, which popularized the works of Jonvelle. He received a Clio Award. Besides photography, he scored the television show Dim Dam Dom. He died on 16 January 2002, aged 58, in a hospital in Paris, of cancer.
