= Wojciech Pszoniak =

Polish actor (1942–2020)

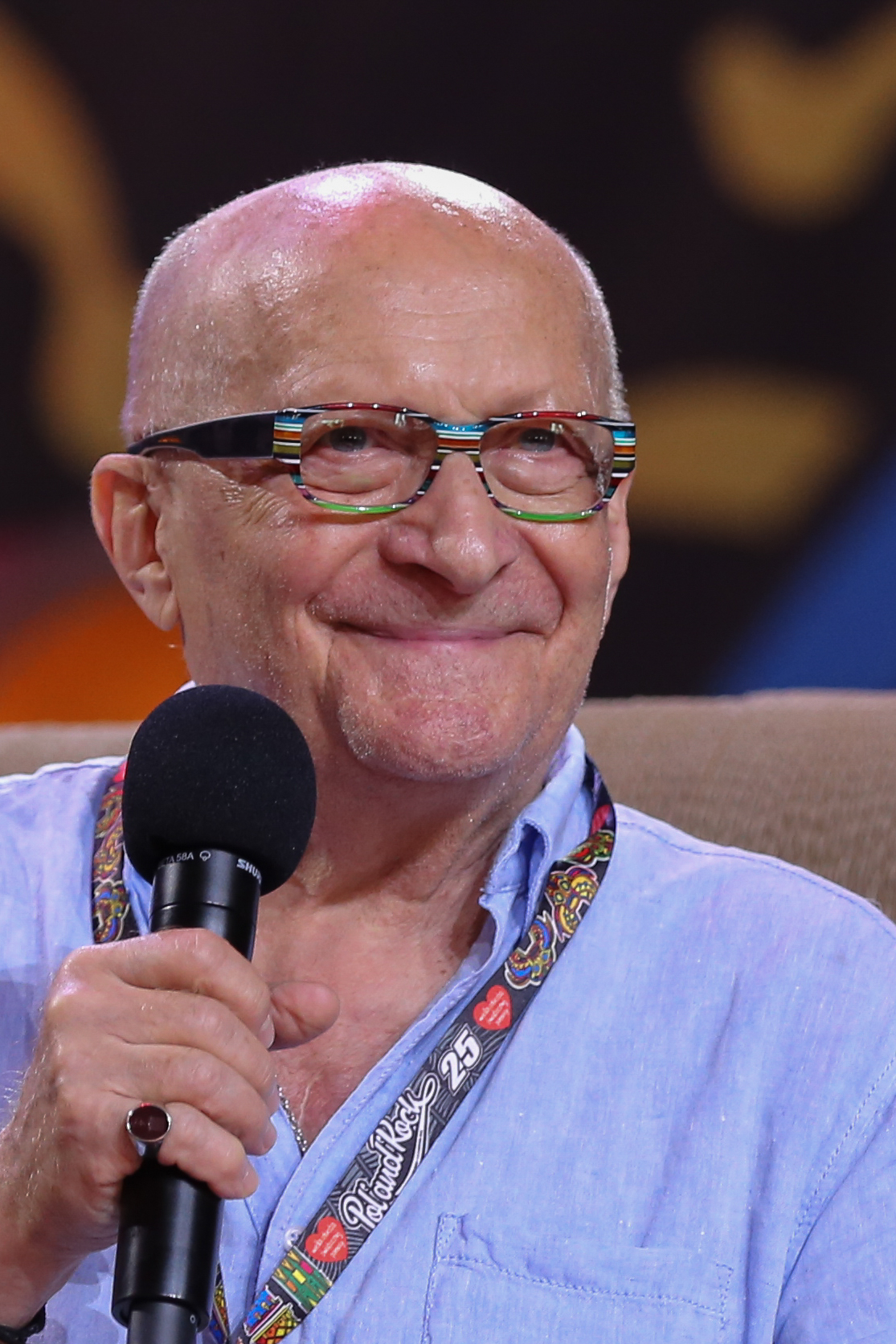
- Pszoniak at the 2019 Pol'and'Rock Festival
- Born: 2 May 1942; Lwów, German-occupied Poland (present-day Ukraine)
- Died: 19 October 2020 (aged 78); Warsaw, Poland
- Education: AST National Academy of Theatre Arts in Kraków (BA)
- Occupations: film and theatre actor, pedagogue
- Years active: 1965–2019

Wojciech Zygmunt Pszoniak (Polish: [ˈvɔjt͡ɕɛx ˈpʂɔɲak]; 2 May 1942 – 19 October 2020) was a Polish film and theatre actor as well as theatre director and pedagogue. He received international recognition for portraying Moritz Welt in Andrzej Wajda's drama film The Promised Land. In 2016, he won the Polish Academy Award for Best Supporting Actor.

== Life and career ==
Pszoniak was born in Lwów, Nazi occupied Poland, now in Ukraine. He gained international visibility following Andrzej Wajda's 1975 film The Promised Land, in which he played Moritz, one of the three main characters.

The actor left Poland during the period of political unrest in 1980–81, when the Solidarity trade union began and was ended by the imposition of martial law on 13 December 1981. Pszoniak found roles in France, where he was living and working. After the fall of communism in Eastern Europe in 1989, Pszoniak appeared in Polish movies and plays.

Internationally, he simplified his first name into Wojtek, which is the standard diminutive of the relatively formal Wojciech in the Polish language.

Pszoniak often played Jewish characters, although he was not of Jewish descent. In France, this was partially attributable to his role in The Promised Land, as well as his foreign accent.

Pszoniak did not speak French when he emigrated to France, so he learned his theatrical lines phonetically; in movies like Danton, where he played Robespierre, his voice was dubbed. An anecdote about his language skills relates that when he started speaking French, one director told him that he preferred his old accent.

In 1990, Gustaw Holoubek ranked Pszoniak among the three greatest Polish dramatic actors post-1965 alongside Andrzej Seweryn and Piotr Fronczewski.

He died in Warsaw, aged 78.

== Selected filmography ==
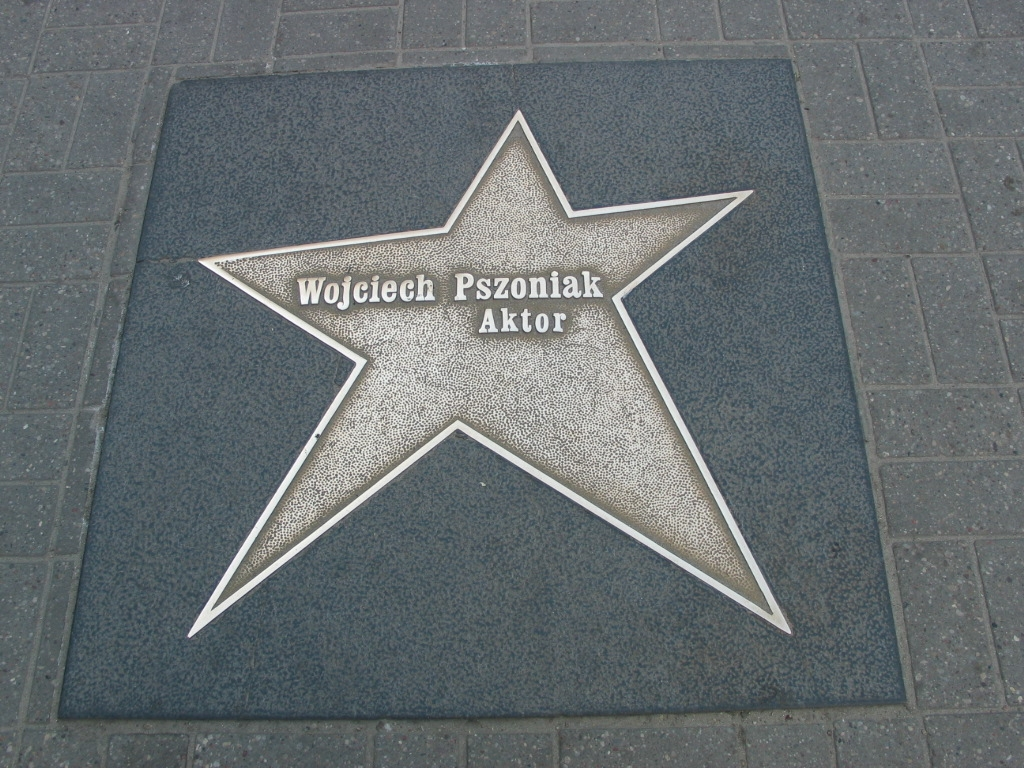
Wojciech Pszoniak's star on the Łódź Walk of Fame

- Twarz aniola (1971) – Ojciec Tadka
- The Devil (1972) – Diabel / Wybawca Jakuba-Jakub's savior
- The Wedding (1973) – Journalist / Stanczyk
- Gniazdo (1974) – Mieszko I
- The Promised Land (1975) – Moryc Welt
- Skazany (1976) – Ryszard Bielczyk
- Obrazki z zycia (1976) – Jerzy Wojciechowski
- Smuga cienia (1976)
- Motylem jestem, czyli romans czterdziestolatka (1976) – Redactor Oswald
- Sprawa Gorgonowej (1977) – Professor
- Rekolekcje (1978) – Marek
- Szpital Przemienienia (1979) – Dr. Marglewski
- The Tin Drum (1979) – Fajngold
- Aria dla atlety (1979) – Siedelmayer, dyrektor cyrku
- Golem (1980) – Prisoner
- Olympics 40 (1980) – Schulz
- Spokojne lata (1982)
- Limuzyna Daimler-Benz (1982) – Bogdanski
- Austeria (1982) – Josele
- Przeprowadzka (1982) – Andrzej Nowicki
- Danton (1983) – Robespierre
- Okno (1983) – Waiter
- Dangerous Moves (1984) – Le grand maître Felton – l'équipe de Fromm
- Angry Harvest (1985) – Cybulkowski
- The Summer of the Samurai (1986) – Gerhard Krall
- Je hais les acteurs (1986) – Hercule Potnik
- Mit meinen heißen Tränen (1986, TV Mini-Series) – Kajetan
- Le testament d'un poète juif assassiné (1988) – Judge
- Les Années sandwiches (1988) – Max
- To Kill a Priest (1988) – Bridge Player
- Deux (1989) – Walkowicz
- Coupe-franche (1989) – Gyuri
- Rosso veneziano (1989) – Antonio Vivaldi
- Monsieur (1990) – Kaltz
- Korczak (1990) – Janusz Korczak
- Gawin (1991) – Pierre / Xerkes
- Coupable d'innocence ou Quand la raison dort (1992) – Karl Ottenhagen
- Le bal des casse-pieds (1992) – Groboniek
- Vent d'est (1993) – Colonel Tcheko
- Ulysses' Gaze (1995) – (uncredited)
- Holy Week (1995) – Zamojski
- Our God's Brother (1997) – The Stranger
- L'amour fou (1997)
- Deuxième vie (2000) – Vincent's father
- Bajland (2000) – Jan Rydel
- Chaos (2001) – Pali
- Le pacte du silence (2003) – L'archevêque
- Là-haut, un roi au-dessus des nuages (2003) – Le producteur
- Vipère au poing (2004) – Le père Volitza
- Strike (2006) – Kaminski
- Hope (2007) – Benedykt Weber
- The Lesser of Two Evils (2009) – Patient
- Mistification (2010) – Pinno
- Robert Mitchum est mort (2010) – Le recteur de l'école
- Mala matura 1947 (2010) – Major Trzaska
- Nie ten czlowiek (2010) – Baron
- Black Thursday (2011) – Władysław Gomułka
- Wygrany (2011) – Karloff
- Le chat du rabbin (2011) – Vastenov (voice)
- Battle of Warsaw 1920 (2011) – Maxime Weygand
- Kret (2011) – Stefan Grabek
- Cassos (2012) – Monsieur Lotz
- Rosemary's Baby (2014, TV Mini-Series) – Mr. Wees
- À la vie (2014) – L'imprimeur
- Carte Blanche (2015) – Professor
- Excentrycy, czyli po słonecznej stronie ulicy (2015) – Felicjan Zuppe
- Gdybyś mu zajrzał w serce (2017) – Le Polonais
- Conservative jester insults society (2019)
- Conservative jester yells at the result of elections (2019)

== Selected honours and distinctions ==
- Eagle Award for his role in Excentrycy, czyli po słonecznej stronie ulicy, (2016)
- Best Supporting Actor Award at the Gdynia Film Festival for his role in Excentrycy, czyli po słonecznej stronie ulicy, (2015)
- Commander's Cross of the Order of Polonia Restituta, (2011)
- National Order of Merit, for his contributions to strengthening Polish-French relations in the field of culture, France (2008)
- Golden Medal of the Medal for Merit to Culture – Gloria Artis, (2007)
- Golden Cross of Merit, (1975)
- Award of the Minister of Foreign Affairs of Poland, (1975)

== See also ==
- Cinema of Poland
- List of Poles
