= Tom Novembre =

French actor and singer (born 1959)

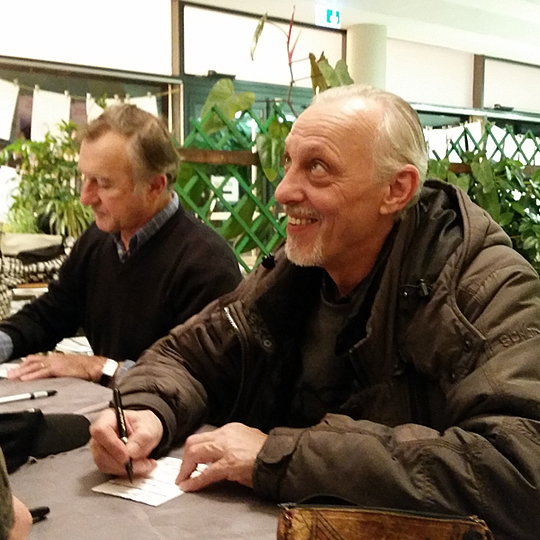
- Tom Novembre - 7 décembre 2018
- Born: 8 November 1959 (age 66); Nancy, France
- Occupation: Actor
- Years active: 1985-present

Tom Novembre (born Jean Thomas Couture; 8 November 1959) is a French actor and singer. He appeared in more than seventy films since 1985.

== Selected filmography ==
| Year | Title | Role | Notes |
|---|---|---|---|
| 2005 | Love Is in the Air | | |
| 2000 | Denti | Micco | |
| 1990 | The Sheltering Sky | | |
| 1987 | Agent trouble | | |
