= Laurent Firode =

French film director and screenwriter

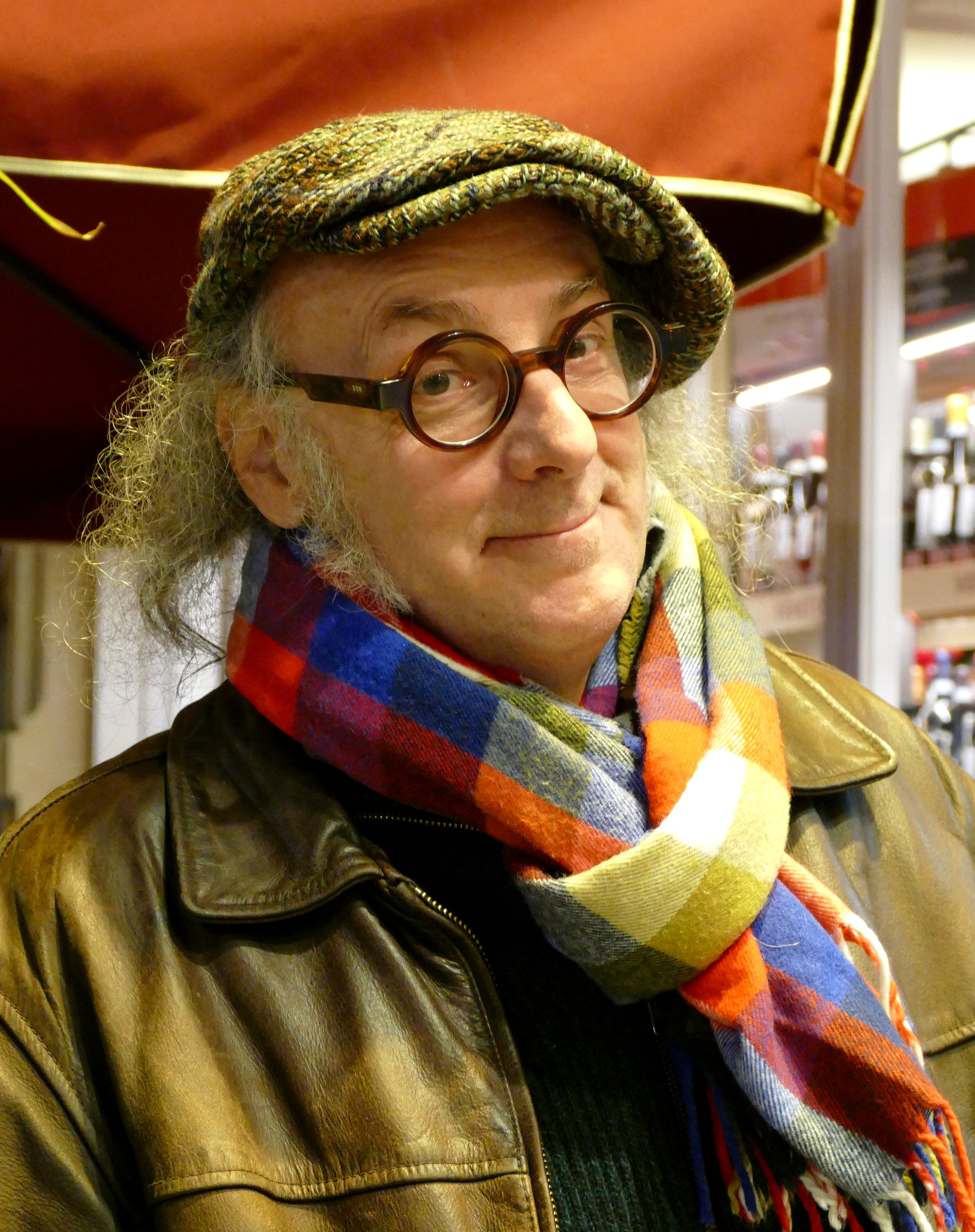
- Born: 11 March 1963 (age 63); Paris, France
- Occupations: Director, screenwriter
- Years active: 1996–present

Laurent Firode (born 11 March 1963) is a French film director and screenwriter.

== Biography ==
=== Directing career ===
After studying Chinese and Arabic, Laurent Firode directed his first short film, La Mort du chanteur de Mexico, in 1993.

The film was a success at festivals and allowed him to make his first feature film, Happenstance (Le Battement d'ailes du papillon), starring Audrey Tautou. After working in Canada on an English-language film, My First Wedding, he returned to France to direct Johnny Hallyday in Quartier VIP. He then wrote and directed several television films, including La Pomme de Newton for Arte, which won the award for Best Screenplay at the Saint-Tropez TV Fiction Festival. In 2012, Firode released the feature film Par amour, before dedicating ten years to directing short films.

In 2022, the director returned to cinemas with Le Monde d'après, a satirical sketch comedy addressing various social phenomena (reactions during the health crisis, neo-feminism, transhumanism, identity extremism, etc.). The film, produced outside the traditional institutions and funding of French cinema, was shown during special screenings in a single theater, where it attracted a few hundred viewers.

In 2026, Laurent Firode is involved in both the writing and directing of a French series in the duanju format, produced by Guillaume Sanjorge, extending a Parisian aesthetic already present in his film work, notably in Le Battement d’ailes du papillon with Audrey Tautou/.

=== YouTube channel ===
Laurent Firode is the producer of the YouTube channel "Les films à l'arrache," which publishes satirical short films. According to an article published in La Lettre, the channel received financial support from the conservative Catholic billionaire Pierre-Édouard Stérin as part of his "Périclès" plan. The channel, described as far-right by Charlie Hebdo, caricatures anti-racist discourse, support for transgender identity, environmentalism, and immigration.

== Filmography ==
Year	Title	Role	Box office	Notes
1996	La mort du chanteur du Mexico	Director, writer, Actor, Editor & Producer		Short; Torino Film Festival - Jury Special Prize; Torino Film Festival - Special Mention; Nominated - Torino Film Festival - Prize of the City of Torino
1996	Super bon prix	Director & writer		Short
1997	La nuit est belle	Director, writer, Actor & Cinematographer		Short; Festival du Film Policier de Cognac - Best Short
1997	Le cri	Director, writer & Actor		Short
1998	Les astres	Director, writer & Cinematographer		Short
1998	La cité Raymond Queneau	Director, Cinematographer & Composer		Short
1999	Les menteurs	Director & writer		Short
1999	Le rendez-vous	Cinematographer		Short directed by Husky Kihal
2000	Happenstance	Director & writer	$727,431	Festival International du Film Francophone de Namur - Best Film; Festival International du Film Francophone de Namur - Best First Screenplay
2004	Moitié-moitié	Director		TV movie
2005	Quartier V.I.P.	Director & writer	$451,530	
2005	La pomme de Newton	Director & writer		TV movie
2006	My First Wedding	Director	$666,154	
2006	Comment lui dire	Director & writer		TV movie
2011	Midi et soir	Director & writer		TV movie
2012	Par amour	Director, writer & Editor		
2012	Télé gaucho	Actor	$758,347	
