= Laetitia Masson =

French film director

Lætitia Masson
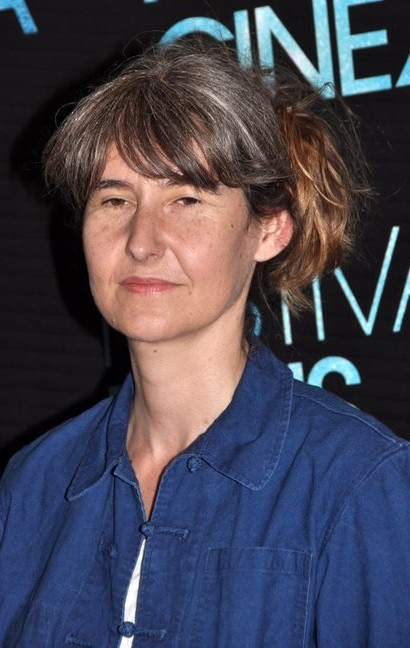
- Laetitia Masson in 2012
- Born: 18 August 1966 (age 60); Épinal, France
- Occupations: Film director, screenwriter
- Years active: 1991–present

Lætitia Masson (born 18 August 1966) is a French film director and screenwriter. She has directed twelve films since 1991. Her film For Sale was screened in the Un Certain Regard section at the 1998 Cannes Film Festival.

== Early life and education ==
Laetitia Masson spent her early years in Nancy, France. Her parents, both teachers, appreciated film. Masson saw her first film by Jean-Luc Godard at the age of seven. Her father was an amateur filmmaker inspired by New Wave cinema, and exposure to this love of film may have contributed to her study of literature and cinema in Paris, before studying as La Fémis film school. There, Masson graduated from the "Département Image," in 1991.

== Career ==
Laetitia Masson has had a prolific film career, directing and writing several short and feature-length films. She has also worked in education and holds a position at La Fémis film school in Paris, France, where she currently directs a 3rd-year workshop. In 2014, Masson was the president of the jury for general and international admissions.

=== Feature films ===
==== To Have (or Not) ====
Written and Directed by Laetitia Masson, To Have (or Not) (1996), her first feature film, was very successful. The film, a production of CLP-Dacia Films and produced by Francois Cuel and Georges Benayoun, follows the story of Alice, a young woman from Boulogne that has just lost her job at the cannery, and Bruno, another lonely heart from Lyon working in construction.

==== For Sale ====
Masson's second feature film, For Sale (1998) is about a woman, France Robert that has disappeared the day of her wedding and the detective that investigates her whereabouts while tracing her life through interviews.

==== Love Me ====
In this film, Love Me (2000), a young woman that escapes her present and past realities in the safety of dreams chases after a singer in search of love. The film is produced by Ciné Valse and stars Sandrine Kiberlain.

==== The Repentant ====
In Masson's 2002 feature film, The Repentant (La Repentie), a woman looking to rebuild her life arrives in a new city, but a stranger man follows her. Masson uses Isabelle Adjani as her femme fatale and incorporates themes of mystery and impulsiveness to illustrate the feeling of starting anew.

==== Pourquoi (pas) le Brésil ====
An adaptation of the book Pourqoui le Brésil by Christine Angot.

==== Coupable ====
A story of unfolding desire, temptation and passion, the maid and the widow are both investigated for the death of Mr. Kaplan.

==== G.H.B. (Être ou pas être) ====
The story of love told from the story of everything, the "story of all stories."

== Filmography ==
=== Director ===
==== Short films ====
- Les Petits Bateaux (1988)
- Un Souvenir de soleil (1990)
- Chante de guerre parisien (1991)
- Nulle Part (1993)
- Veritage de l'amour (1994)
- Je suis venue te dire (1997)

==== Feature Length ====
- To Have (or Not) (1995)
- For Sale (1998)
- Love Me (2000)
- The Repentant (2002)
- Pourquoi (pas) le Brésil (2004)
- Coupable (2007)
- G.H.B. (Être ou pas être) (2013)
- Un hiver en été (2023)
- Suzanne la pleureuse (TBA)

==== Television ====
- 3000 scénarios contre un virus (1994–1995), 1 episode
- Vertige de l'amour (1995)
- L'erotisme ve par… (2001) 1 episode
- Quelle importance (2001)
- X Femmes (2008- ), 1 episode
- Enculées (2008) Season 1, Episode 4
- Petite Fille (2011)
- Aurore (2017), 3 Episodes
  - Requiem (2017)
  - Les fantômes (2017)
  - L'enfance (2017)
- Chevrotine (2022)

=== Writer ===
- Bar des rails (1991), credited as "script girl"
- Chant de guerre parisien (1991)
- Nulle part (1993)
- En avoir (ou pas) (1996)
- Je suis venue te dire (1997)
- For Sale (1998)
- Love Me (2000)
- The Repentant (2002)
- Pourquoi (pas) le Brésil (2004)
- Coupable (2007)
- X Femmes (2008- ), 1 episode
- Enculées (2008) Season 1, Episode 4
- Petite Fille (2011)
- G.H.B. (Être ou pas être) (2013)
- Aurore (2017), 3 Episodes
- Requiem (2017)
- Les fantômes (2017)
- L'enfance (2017)

=== Actress ===
- Les dernières heures du millénaire (1990)
- Normal People Are Nothing Exceptional (1993)
- Souvenir (1996) – Cigarette Girl
- Elie annonce Semoun (2000) - Various characters
- Un grain de beauté (2003) - La sixième comedienne
- Pourquoi (pas) le Brésil 2004) - Elle-même
- X Femmes (2008) Episode: Enculées - La réalisatrice / The director
- Number One (2017) - Femme Club Olympe

=== Cinematographer ===
- Les surprises du ver à soie (1991)
- Lents que nous sommes (1992)
- La table d'émeraude (1992)
- Dans ta bouche (2010)

=== Camera and Electrical Department ===
- La Belle Noiseuse (1990), Assistant Camera

== Awards ==
2018 Winner – Best Director Prize – French Association of Series Critics: Aurore (2017)
