= Amira Casar =

British-born actress

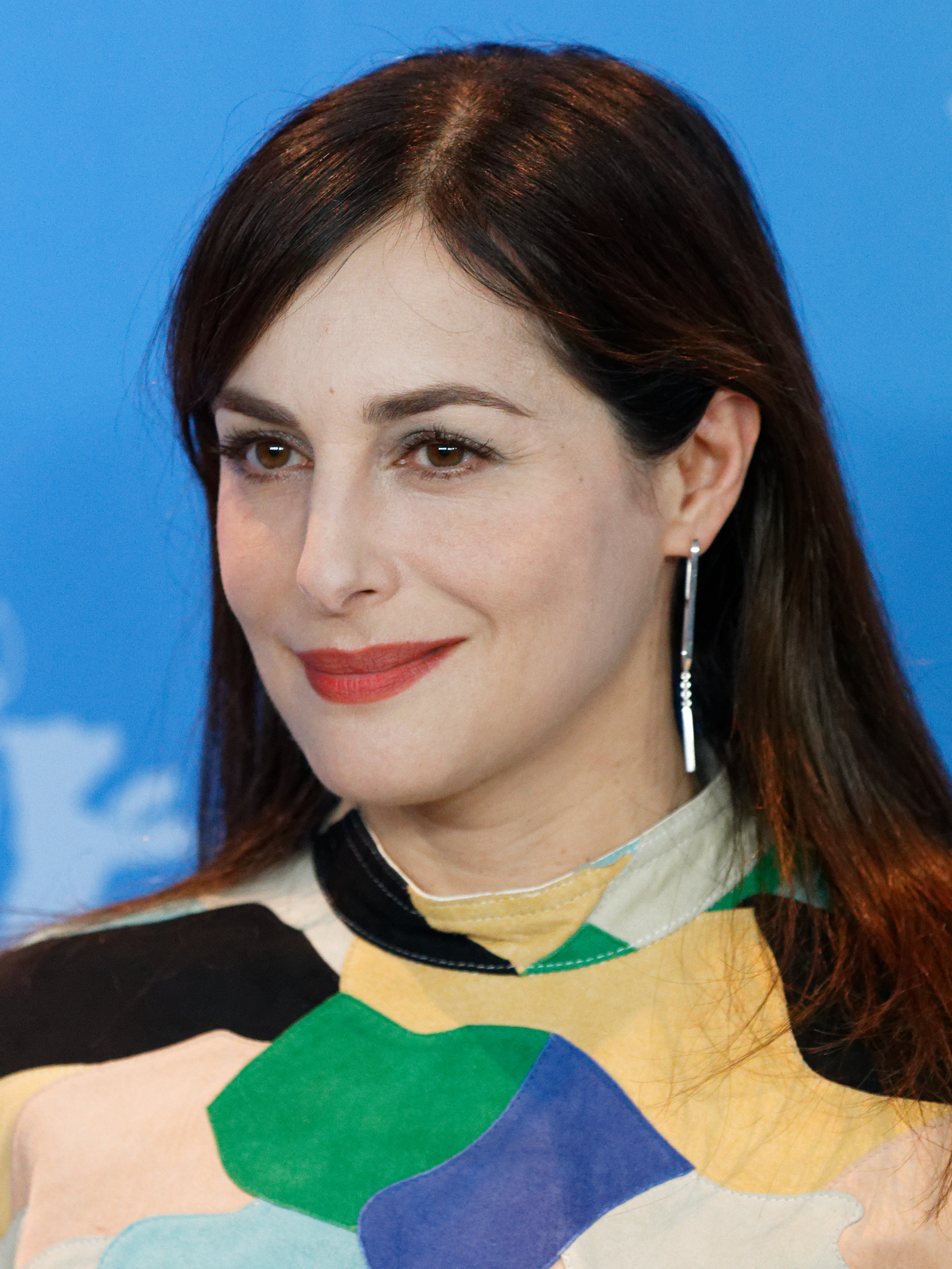
- Casar in 2017
- Born: London, England
- Occupation: Actress
- Years active: 1989–present

Amira Casar is a British-French film actress. She was nominated for a César Award for Most Promising Actress for the 1997 film La Vérité si je mens! and also for the Palme d'Or at the 2005 Cannes Film Festival for the film To Paint or Make Love. In 2010, she won the Best Actress award at La Rochelle Television Film Festival in 2010 for her turn in La femme qui pleure au chapeau rouge.

== Early life ==
Amira Casar was born in London and raised in England, Ireland, and France. Her father is Kurdish and her mother is Russian. She studied drama at the Conservatoire National d'Art Dramatique de Paris between 1991 and 1994. She is fluent in English, Kurdish, and French and has also worked in German, Italian, and Spanish.

== Career ==
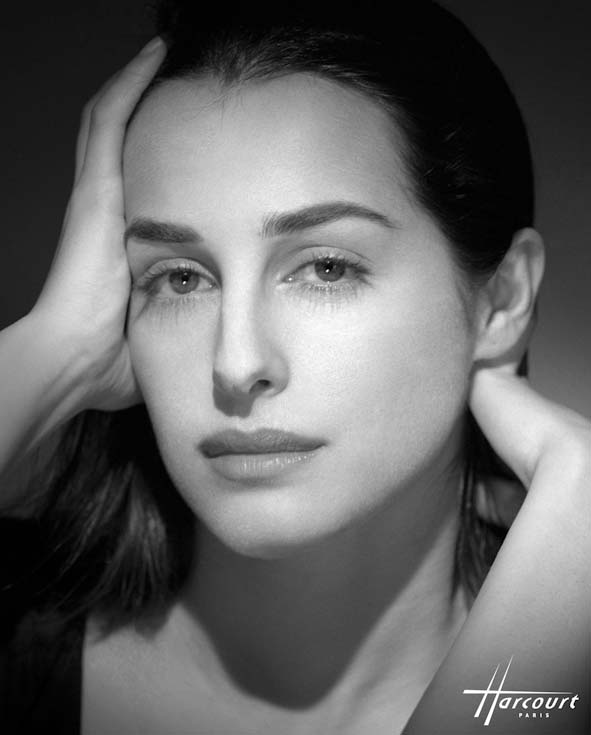
Casar in 1998

Casar's first role was in the 1989 film Erreur de jeunesse (Error of Youth) by Radovan Tadic. She played Sandra Benzakhem in the 1997 film La Vérité si je mens !, for which she was nominated for a César Award for Most Promising Actress. She later appeared in the film's two sequels, in 2001 and 2012.

Casar portrayed Myriem in How I Killed My Father (2001) by Anne Fontaine; Assia Wevill in Sylvia (2003) by Christine Jeffs; the lead role of The Woman in the Catherine Breillat erotic film Anatomy of Hell (2004); and Eva in To Paint or Make Love (2005) by Arnaud and Jean-Marie Larrieu, which was nominated for the Palme d'Or at the 2005 Cannes Film Festival.

Other roles include Marianne in Hypnotized and Hysterical (2002), a film by Claude Duty which won the Grand Golden Rail at the 2002 Cannes Film Festival; Malvina van Stille in The Piano Tuner of Earthquakes by the Brothers Quay (2005); and Marie in Tony Gatlif's Transylvania in 2006.

In 2007, Casar appeared in installation artist Sophie Calle's Venice Biennale piece Prenez soin de vous (Take Care of Yourself).

In 2008, she played Dolorès in Laetitia Masson's Coupable, and portrayed Irene in Werner Schroeter's last film, Nuit de chien. Casar played the lead role of Anna Di Baggio in the Éléonore Faucher film Gamines in 2009.

She won the Best Actress award at La Rochelle Television Film Festival for her portrayal of Dora Maar in La femme qui pleure au chapeau rouge in 2010. In 2011, Casar played Irène in Let My People Go !, and Deniz in Playoff. In 2013, she appeared in the Arnaud des Pallières film Michael Kohlhaas, and portrayed Anne-Marie Munoz in Bertrand Bonello's Saint Laurent in 2014.

In 2015, Casar appeared in The Forbidden Room by Canadian director Guy Maddin. and portrayed Béatrice, Madame de Clermont, in the TV series Versailles. In 2017, she played Annella Perlman in the film Call Me by Your Name. She also appeared in the 2019 Caroline Fourest film Sisters in Arms, about a team of female Kurdish soldiers and volunteers.

In 2022, Casar appeared in the film The Contractor. She portrayed Edith Frank, the mother of Anne Frank, in the 2023 Disney+ series A Small Light.

On stage, Casar's work includes the Almeida Theatre production of Aunt Dan and Lemon, the title role in Hedda Gabler at Le Petit Théâtre de Paris, and Olivier Py's 2009 production of Les Enfants de Saturne at the Theatre National de L'Odéon, Paris. In 2011, she appeared in the title role of Petra in The Bitter Tears of Petra von Kant, and received critical acclaim in Arthur Honegger's Jeanne d'Arc au bûcher at the Barbican Centre with the London Symphony Orchestra.

Casar also appeared in the 1995 Bryan Adams music video for "Have You Ever Really Loved a Woman?".

== Filmography ==
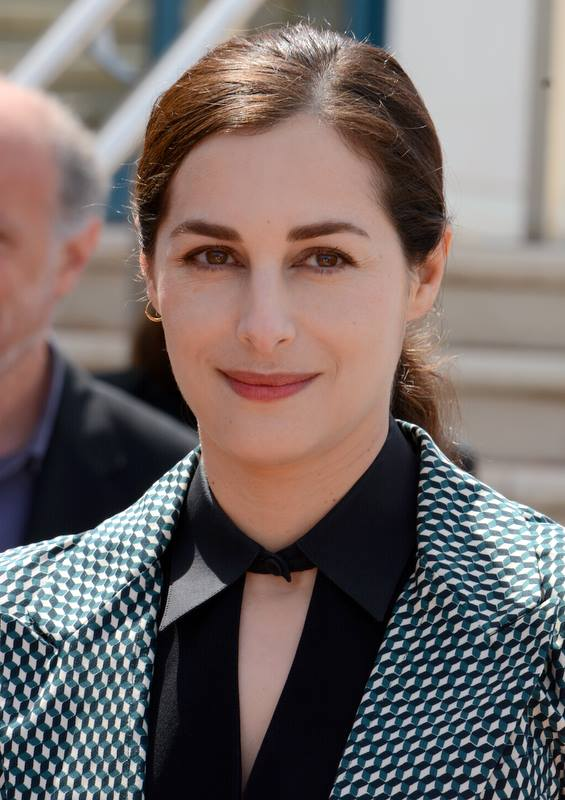
Casar in 2013

Film
Year	Title	Role	Director
1989	Erreur de jeunesse	Girl on the train	Radovan Tadic
1994	Le Temps du bonheur (short)		Caroline Champetier
1995	Départ immediat (short)	Woman	Thomas Briat
1995	Ainsi soient-elles	Alice	Patrick Alessandrin
1996	Tiré à part	Farida	Bernard Rapp
1996	Mirada liquida	Ana	Rafael Monleon
1997	Marie from the Bay of Angels	Young woman at the villa	Manuel Pradal
1997	La Vérité si je mens !	Sandra Benzakhem	Thomas Gilou
1999	Why Not Me?	Camille	Stéphane Giusti
1999	Le Derrière	Anne-Laure	Valérie Lemercier
2000	Tôt ou tard	Catherine	Anne-Marie Etienne
2000	Le coeur à l'ouvrage	Noëlle	Laurent Dussaux
2001	Quand on sera grand	Claire	Renaud Cohen
2001	La Vérité si je mens ! 2	Sandra Benzakhem	Thomas Gilou
2001	How I Killed My Father	Myriem	Anne Fontaine
2001	Buñuel y la mesa del rey Salomón	Fatima / Carmen	Carlos Saura
2002	Hypnotized and Hysterical (Hairstylist Wanted)	Marianne	Claude Duty
2003	Un autre homme	Marie	Catherine Klein
2003	Sylvia	Assia Wevill	Christine Jeffs
2003	The Very Merry Widows	Claudia	Catherine Corsini
2003	Under Another Sky (Les Chemins de l'oued)	Nadia	Gaël Morel
2004	Toi, vieux (short)	Ghost	Pierre Coré
2004	Rien, voilà l'ordre	Zelda Mitchell	Jacques Baratier
2004	Anatomy of Hell	The Woman	Catherine Breillat
2005	The Piano Tuner of Earthquakes	Malvina van Stille	Brothers Quay
2005	To Paint or Make Love	Ava	Arnaud Larrieu
2005	La cloche a sonné	Vera	Bruno Herbulot
2006	Transylvania	Marie	Tony Gatlif
2007	The Last Mistress	Mademoiselle Divine des Airelles	Catherine Breillat
2007	Kandisha	Nyla Jayde	Jérôme Cohen-Olivar
2007	Intrusions	Muriel	Emmanuel Bourdieu
2008	Quelques nouvelles du continent	Alice	Max Jourdan
2008	Nuit de chien	Irene	Werner Schroeter
2008	Made in Italy	Isabella	Stéphane Giusti
2008	Le Voyage aux Pyrénées	Socialite journalist	Arnaud et Jean-Marie Larrieu
2008	Coupable	Dolorès	Laetitia Masson
2009	Oscar et la dame rose	Mme Gommette	Éric-Emmanuel Schmitt
2009	Gamines	Anna Di Biaggio	Éléonore Faucher
2009	Park Benches	Customer	Bruno Podalydès
2010	Districted Leporello (short)	Woman	Julião Sarmento
2011	Playoff	Deniz	Eran Riklis
2011	Let My People Go !	Irène	Mikael Buch
2012	Michael Kohlhaas	Abbess	Arnaud des Pallières
2012	La vérité si je mens ! 3	Sandra Benzakhem	Thomas Gilou
2013	Spiritismes		Guy Maddin
2014	Saint Laurent	Anne-Marie Munoz	Bertrand Bonello
2014	Not My Type	Marie	Lucas Belvaux
2015	The Last Summer of the Rich	Hanna von Stezewitz	Peter Kern
2015	The Forbidden Room	Mrs. M____	Guy Maddin
2015	Me and Kaminski	Miriam Kaminski	Wolfgang Becker
2016	Night of 1000 Hours	Renate Bode	Virgil Widrich
2017	Call Me by Your Name	Annella Perlman	Luca Guadagnino
2018	At Eternity's Gate	Johanna van Gogh-Bonger	Julian Schnabel
2019	Sisters in Arms	Commander	Caroline Fourest
2019	Curiosa	Madame de Heredia	Lou Jeunet
2020	Honey Cigar	Selma's mother	Kamir Aïnouz
2022	The Contractor	Sophie Mohsin	Tarik Saleh
2023	Visions	Johana Van Damaker	Yann Gozlan
2025	Honeyjoon	Lela	Lilian T. Mehrel

Television
Year	Title	Role	Notes
1996	Sharpe's Siege	Catherine	TV series, S04E02
1997	Opération Bugs Bunny	Marie-Noëlle	TV movie
2000	Arabian Nights	Morgiana	TV miniseries
2001	Murder on the Orient Express	Helena von Strauss	TV movie
2003	40	Kristina	TV miniseries
2003	The Thibaults	Rachel	TV miniseries
2008	Les Héritières	Antonia	TV movie
2010	La femme qui pleure au chapeau rouge	Dora Maar	TV movie
2015	Versailles	Béatrice, Madame de Clermont	TV series
2017	Tensions sur le Cap Corse	Gabrielle Monti	TV movie
2019	Savages (Les Sauvages)	Daria	TV series
2021	Voltaire High (Mixte_(série_télévisée))	Irène	TV Series, S1E5
2023	A Small Light	Edith Frank	TV miniseries
2024	La Maison	Perle Foster	TV series

== Accolades ==
- 1998 – Nomination: César Award for Most Promising Actress for La Vérité si je mens !
- 2016 – Chevalier of the Order of Arts and Letters
