= Caren Pistorius =

New Zealand actress

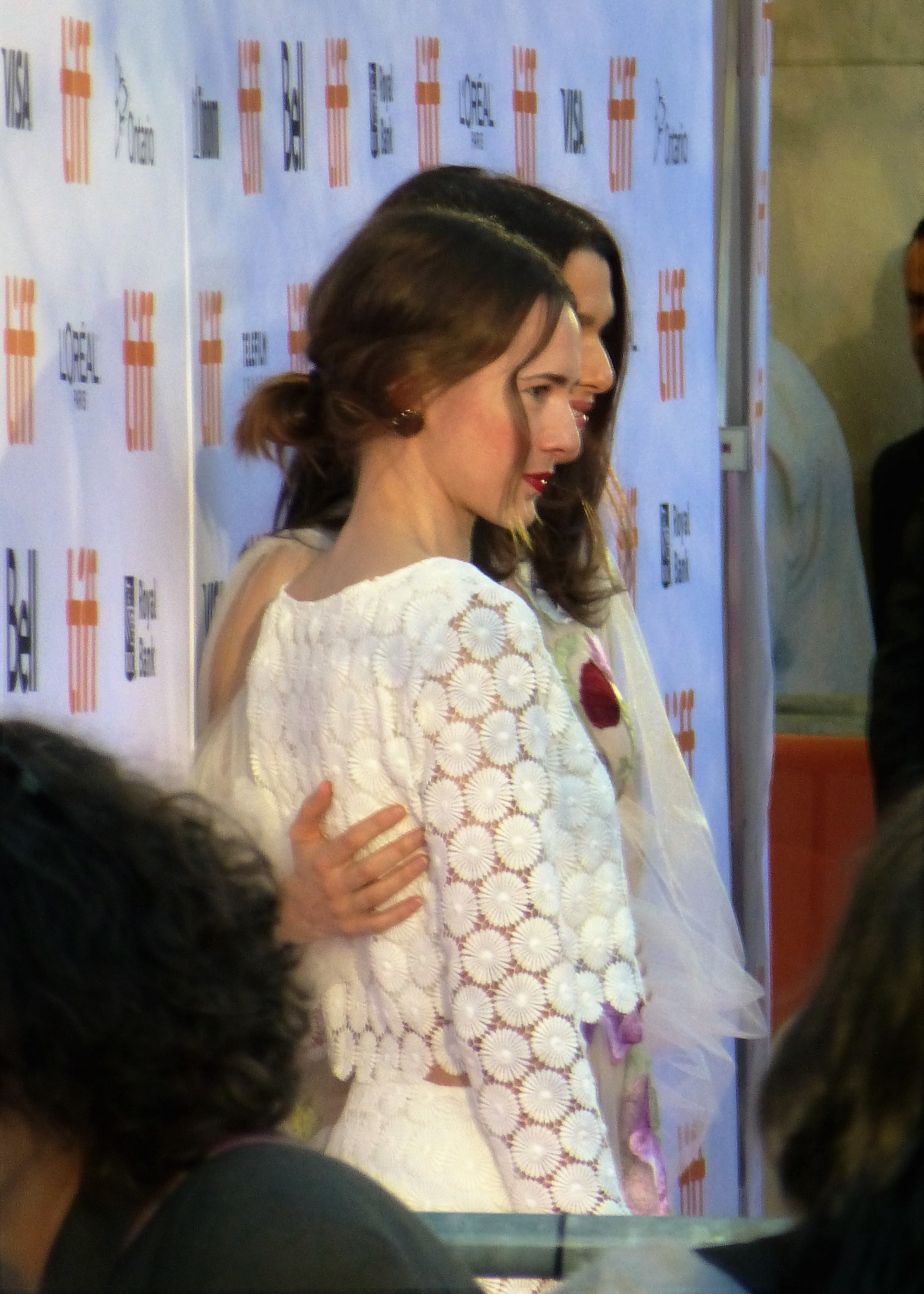
- Pistorius in 2016
- Born: 30 September 1990 (age 35); Rustenburg, Transvaal, South Africa
- Occupation: Actress
- Years active: 2009–present

Caren Pistorius (born 30 September 1990) is a New Zealand actress. She is known for her performance in the 2015 film Slow West.

== Early life ==
Pistorius was born in Rustenburg, South Africa. Her family moved to Auckland, New Zealand, when she was 12. She took drama classes at school. She studied at the Auckland University of Technology.

== Acting career ==
Pistorius began her professional acting career at the age of 19, when she made her television debut in the American television series Legend of the Seeker in the episode "Confession”, playing Luna. Pistorius played the role of Chloe in the romantic drama film The Most Fun You Can Have Dying, directed by Kirstin Marcon, which was released on 26 April 2012. The same year, Pistorius appeared as Amy in the comedy series Hounds.

In 2013, Pistorius appeared as Rose Harper in the crime drama series The Blue Rose. The same year, she was cast in the miniseries Paper Giants: Magazine Wars, playing Beth Ridgeway, as well as the comedy-drama series Offspring, where she played the supporting role of Eloise Ward.

In 2015, Pistorius co-starred with Kodi Smit-McPhee, Michael Fassbender and Ben Mendelsohn in the Revisionist Western film Slow West, where she played the role of Rose Ross. It premiered at the 2015 Sundance Film Festival on 24 January 2015 and was first released on 15 May 2015 in the United States, with a simultaneous release on video on demand.

In 2016, Pistorius was cast in the romantic drama film The Light Between Oceans, in which she played the character Lucy Grace Rutherford / Adult Lucy Grace. The same year, Pistorius played the role of Laura Tyler in the biographical film Denial.

Pistorius then played Lorraine Cassidy in the 2017 Australian post-apocalyptic horror drama film Cargo. The same year, she was cast in the miniseries Wake in Fright, as Janette Hynes.

In 2018, Pistorius was cast to play the role of Anne in the comedy-drama film Gloria Bell, also starring Julianne Moore. The same year, she appeared in the post-apocalyptic steampunk film Mortal Engines.

In early 2020, Pistorius was cast to play the role of Claire in the film High Ground, which premiered at the 70th Berlin International Film Festival on 23 February 2020, with the Australian premiere at the Brisbane International Film Festival later that year, and theatrical release in Australia on 28 January 2021. Also that year, Pistorius starred with Russell Crowe, Gabriel Bateman, Jimmi Simpson and Austin P. McKenzie in the action thriller film Unhinged, where she played the role of Rachel Flynn.

Pistorius was cast in the psychological thriller film The Marsh King's Daughter, where she played the role of Beth, the mother of Helena Pelletier, which was released in the United States on November 3, 2023, by Lionsgate and Roadside Attractions.

== Filmography ==
=== Film ===
Year	Title	Role	Notes
2012	The Most Fun You Can Have Dying	Chloe	
2015	Slow West	Rose Ross	
2016	The Light Between Oceans	Adult Lucy-Grace	
2016	Denial	Laura Tyler	
2017	Cargo	Lorraine	
2018	Gloria Bell	Anne	
2018	Mortal Engines	Pandora Shaw	
2020	High Ground	Claire	
2020	Unhinged	Rachel Flynn	
2023	The Marsh King's Daughter	Beth	

=== Television ===
Year	Title	Role	Notes
2009	Legend of the Seeker	Luna	Episode: "Confession”
2012	Hounds	Amy	6 episodes
2013	The Blue Rose	Rose Harper	8 episodes
2013	Paper Giants: Magazine Wars	Beth Ridgeway	2 episodes
2013	Offspring	Eloise Ward	13 episodes
2013	Redfern Now	Janine Myles	Episode: “Babe in Arms"
2017	Wake in Fright	Janette Hynes	2 episodes

== Awards and nominations ==
Year	Award	Category	Work	Result
2014	Equity Ensemble Awards	Outstanding Performance by an Ensemble in a Mini-series or Telemovie	Paper Giants: Magazine Wars	Nominated
2014	Equity Ensemble Awards	Outstanding Performance by an Ensemble Series in a Drama Series	Offspring	Nominated
2014	Equity Ensemble Awards	Outstanding Performance by an Ensemble Series in a Drama Series	Redfern Now	Won
2014	Logie Awards	Most Popular New Talent	Offspring	Nominated
2014	Logie Awards	Most Outstanding New Talent	Paper Giants: Magazine Wars	Nominated
2017	Best Actress	Best Actress	Slow West	Nominated
