= Gilles Guillain =

Colombian-born French actor (born 1982)

- Born: May 11, 1982 (age 44); Bogotá, Colombia

Gilles Guillain (born 11 May 1982) is a Colombian-born French actor.

His breakthrough role was in the film, Brief Crossing in 2001.

== Filmography ==
Year	Movie	Role	Director
2001	Brève traversée (Brief Crossing)	Thomas	Catherine Breillat
2003	Far West	Mika	Pascal-Alex Vincent
2005	Yeux ouverts, Les	Fred	Julie Gousty
2006	Le Prestige de la mort	Edward	Luc Moullet
2006	Dans la chambre	Julien	Nicolas Dier
2008	Tout est écrit	Man	Maël Buathier
2012	Le Prolongement de moi	Gabriel	Steve Catieau
2014	Alices	Man 2	Ariane Boukerche
2015	L'homme nodosité	Hük	Hande Sigman
