= Play or Die =

- Directed by: Jacques Kluger
- Written by: Jacques Kluger; Amiel Bartana
- Based on: Puzzle by Franck Thilliez
- Starring: Charley Palmer Rothwell; Roxane Mesquida
- Cinematography: Danny Elsen
- Release date: 18 April 2019 (United States)
- Country: Belgium
- Language: English

Play or Die is a 2019 Belgian horror film directed by Jacques Kluger. The film is based on the bestseller novel titled Puzzle by Franck Thilliez. The plot revolves around Lucas (Charley Palmer Rothwell), a young man who participates in a game called Paranoia, which is used as a means to make several atrocities.

The film premiered on 18 April 2019 in the United States, and 10 July 2019 in VOD format.

== Plot ==
Lucas and Chloé are a former dysfunctional couple who, after having spent a year apart, meet again when Chloé decides to invite him to play a game called Paranoia, which offers a million euros to the two players who finish the game. After gathering the clues and solving puzzles, the two are accepted into the game and arrive at an abandoned hospital where it will take place. Upon entering, they find a handful of other players that have also qualified in the same manner. A mysterious voice suddenly announces the rules of the game as well as how to play but does not tell them two hidden rules: nothing is real, and one of them will die.

Upon starting, Lucas begins to notice oddities in how the game is set up. He assumes the game's organisers are trying to kill every player, but Chloé refuses to believe that anyone wants to kill them all. Shortly after passing the game's first test, they run into the corpse of one of the players. Frightened, Chloé and Lucas try to finish the game to save their lives. In another room, they discover another dead player and some papers with information about Naomi, who was admitted to the hospital years ago and noted as a dangerous patient. Chloé deduces that Naomi must have been committing the murders.

The couple reach the final test, which tasks them with going to the abandoned hospital church. Chloé discovers that Lucas is really the murderer and that he is a psychopath who suffers from memory loss. Chloé makes him believe that they are about to reach the end of the game, finds a ladder to go up to the second floor of the church, then pushes him off and flees. However, he manages to find her and kill her.

Lucas, unaware of what he is doing, "confronts" the murderer and overpowers him in a fight. When he orders the killer to take his mask off, he discovers he shares his face and realizes he is responsible for murdering his mother and organizing the game. He tells police that the murderer has escaped.

== Cast ==
- Charley Palmer Rothwell as Lucas
  - Koah Edwards as Child Lucas
  - Igor van Dessel as Teenager Lucas
- Roxane Mesquida as Chloé
- Marie Zabukovec as Naomi
- Thomas Mustin as Jablowski
- Daphné Huynh as Maxine
- Hippolyte de Poucques as Ray
- Caroline Donnelly as Lucas' mother
- Helena Chambon as Nurse
- Laetitia Chambon as Nurse
