= Bewitched (disambiguation) =

Bewitched is an American television sitcom.

Bewitched may also refer to:

== Film and video games ==
- Bewitched (1945 film), a film noir by Arch Oboler
- Bewitched (2005 film), comedy based on remaking the sitcom
- Bewitched (video game), a game for the VIC-20 by Imagine Software

== Literature ==
- The Bewitched, an 1852 novel by Jules Barbey d'Aurevilly

== Music ==
=== Artists ===
- Bewitched (American band), a band led by former Sonic Youth drummer Bob Bert
- Bewitched (Swedish band)
- B*Witched, an Irish girl group

=== Albums ===
- B*Witched (album), a 1998 album by the group
- Bewitched (Laufey album), 2023
- Bewitched (Luna album), 1994
- Bewitched (Andy Summers and Robert Fripp album), 1984
- Bewitched (Jack Jones album), 1964
- Bewitched (EP), 1985
- Bewitched – Music from the Motion Picture by George Fenton (2005)
- Bewitched, a 1993 album by Laura Fygi

=== Songs ===
- "Bewitched, Bothered and Bewildered", also "Bewitched", a 1941 song by Rodgers and Hart
- "Bewitched", a song by Candlemass from Nightfall
- "Bewitched", a song by White Town from Socialism, Sexism & Sexuality

== See also ==
- I Married a Witch (1942), a comedy film starring Veronica Lake and Fredric March
