= Fu'ad Aït Aattou =

French actor and model

- Born: 2 November 1980 (age 46)
- Occupations: Actor, model
- Years active: 2007–present

Fu'ad Aït Aattou (born 2 November 1980) is a French actor and model of Moroccan and French descent.

== Biography ==
Fu'ad Aït Aattou was born on 2 November 1980. Aït Aattou's father is Moroccan Berber origin, while his mother is of French origin. He spent his childhood in the North of France, then moved to Paris to attend a school of dramatic art for three years. He worked as a model and went to acting auditions. In 2007, he played the lead in The Last Mistress opposite Asia Argento and Roxane Mesquida after he was discovered by director Catherine Breillat in a Paris café.

== Filmography ==
| Year | Film | Role | Notes |
|---|---|---|---|
| 2007 | The Last Mistress (Une vieille maîtresse) | Ryno de Marigny | |
| 2012 | What the Day Owes the Night | Younes | |
