= The Sleeping Beauty (2010 film) =

2010 French film

- Directed by: Catherine Breillat
- Written by: Catherine Breillat
- Starring: Carla Besnaïnou
- Cinematography: Denis Lenoir
- Edited by: Pascal Chavance
- Release date: 2010
- Country: France
- Language: French

The Sleeping Beauty (French: La Belle Endormie) is a 2010 French fantasy drama film written and directed by Catherine Breillat. It is a composite adaptation of Charles Perrault’s fairy tale of the same name and Hans Christian Andersen’s The Snow Queen, taking its title and primary narrative from the former while incorporating the latter’s story into its dream internal narrative.

The film premiered at the 68th edition of the Venice Film Festival, in the Horizons competition.

== Cast ==
- Carla Besnaïnou as Anastasia at 10
- Julia Artamonov as Anastasia at 16
- Kerian Mayan as Peter
- David Chausse as Johan
- Diana Rudychenko as Véroutchka
- Jean-Philippe Tessé as the Father
- Dominique Hulin as the Prince

== Production ==
The film is the second Charles Perrault's fairy tale adapted by Breillat, following 2009's Bluebeard. It was shot in March 2010.

== Release ==
The film premiered at the 67th edition of the Venice Film Festival, in which it served as the opening film of the Orizzonti sidebar. It was also screened at the 35th Toronto International Film Festival and at the 54th San Francisco International Film Festival.

== Reception ==
On the review aggregator website Rotten Tomatoes, 75% of 28 critics' reviews are positive. Metacritic, which uses a weighted average, assigned the film a score of 69 out of 100 based on 12 critics, indicating "generally favorable" reception.

Manohla Dargis from The New York Times described the film as "wily and witty" and as "driven by concepts rather than sumptuous illusionism". Kristy Puchko from The Film Stage wrote: "The Sleeping Beauty is a poetic and haunting coming-of-age tale full of playfully strange visual elements that tease the viewer and set off sparks in forgotten realms of the imagination. It’s an intoxicating trip". Los Angeles Times' Sheri Linden referred to the film as "sly and playful, [...] a beauty". Gabe Toro from IndieWire claimed that the film "plum[s] depths not seen in this genre since Neil Jordan's soulful The Company of Wolves".
