= Mercury in Retrograde =

2017 film, directed by Michael Glover Smith

- theatrical release poster
- Directed by: Michael Glover Smith
- Written by: Michael Glover Smith
- Produced by: Shane Simmons; Kevin Wright
- Starring: Roxane Mesquida; Najarra Townsend
- Cinematography: Jason Chiu
- Edited by: Frank V. Ross
- Distributed by: Emphasis Entertainment
- Release date: September 16, 2017 (Full Bloom Film Festival)
- Running time: 105 minutes
- Country: United States
- Language: English

Mercury in Retrograde is a 2017 American drama film written and directed by Michael Glover Smith, and starring French actress Roxane Mesquida. The film follows three couples from Chicago as they navigate personal challenges while vacationing together for a weekend in southwestern Michigan. The film premiered at the 2017 Full Bloom Film Festival in Statesville, North Carolina where it won the Best Narrative Feature award.

== Plot ==
Three couples from Chicago vacation together for a weekend at a lakeside cabin in Michigan: Isabelle and Richard have been together for five years and are deeply unhappy; Jack and Golda have been happily married for 10 years; and Peggy and Wyatt just started dating and don't yet know each other well. Over the course of three days in this relationship drama, hidden tensions and secrets slowly come to the surface.

== Background and production ==
In an interview at RogerEbert.com, Smith discussed the notion of vacations being "anything but an escape" as the impetus for the film: "The fact that the characters are away from their daily routine serves as a catalyst to examine their lives and relationships. These couples are interacting with each other [in this new setting] and it forces them to see their own relationships in a new light". He also mentioned German director F. W. Murnau as an influence, noting how the films Sunrise: A Song of Two Humans and City Girl are "about couples moving from either the city to the country or vice versa, and about the kind of psychological shift that occurs to accompany the geographical shift".

Production of the film took place over two weeks in Chicago and Fennville, Michigan in August 2016.

== Cast ==
- Roxane Mesquida as Isabelle
- Najarra Townsend as Peggy
- Alana Arenas as Golda
- Jack C. Newell as Jack
- Shane Simmons as Wyatt
- Kevin Wehby as Richard

== Release ==
Among the film's theatrical screenings: Spectacle Theater in Brooklyn, Rooftop Cinema Club NeueHouse in Los Angeles, and the Gene Siskel Film Center and the Music Box Theatre's "Virtual Cinema" (after the COVID-19 pandemic) in Chicago, as well as the Tallahassee Film Festival (where it won the award for Best Narrative Feature).

=== Home Video ===
Emphasis Entertainment Group released a special edition Blu-ray of the film on September 6, 2019. It was announced in 2021 that Music Box Films had acquired VOD rights for their Music Box Direct streaming service.

== Reception ==
Mercury in Retrograde has received generally favorable reviews for its writing, acting, and directing. Among the positive notices were a three-star review by the Chicago Sun-Times' Richard Roeper who called it "absolutely beautiful...a smart, funny, quietly effective and authentic slice of older millennial life", and a Chicago Reader review that deemed it "an observant, nuanced indie". As of May 2021, Rotten Tomatoes shows an approval rating of 71%, based on seven reviews.
