= Pana Hema Taylor =

New Zealand actor (born 1989)

- Born: 1989 (age 36–37); Auckland, New Zealand
- Occupation: Actor
- Years active: 2007 – present
- Spouse: Danielle Cormack (m. 2009; div. 2013)
- Children: 2

Pana Hema Taylor (born 1989) is a New Zealand television actor, best known for his roles in Spartacus, The Brokenwood Mysteries and Westside.

== Early life ==
Pana Hema Taylor grew up in the town of Wairoa, where he became involved with the New Zealand street gang, Mongrel Mob.

In order to keep him from becoming a gang member, his parents, who had split up a while before, decided that he should live with his father in Christchurch, New Zealand where he attended Aranui High School. In 2007, he won best actor for his role as Mercutio in the school's production of Romeo and Juliet.

== Career ==
Hema Taylor was first seen on TV in 2007 on the Māori language educational series Whanau. He has since worked on various New Zealand feature films including Boy and Kawa. Hema Taylor is best known for his work in the Starz television series Spartacus: Vengeance and Spartacus: War of the Damned, playing the role of the Syrian rebel Nasir. In 2014 he was cast as Mana in the New Zealand action film The Dead Lands.

He starred as Jared in The Brokenwood Mysteries series 1–6, and as Bert in Westside.

== Personal life ==
In 2009, Hema Taylor met actress Danielle Cormack when she was the costume/set designer on a play he was in. The two have a son, Te Ahi Ka, born 19 March 2010. They divorced in 2013.

In March 2015, Taylor and his partner Naomi Campbell had a daughter.

Hema Taylor is of Māori (Ngāti Kahungunu) heritage.

== Filmography ==
=== Film ===
Year	Title	Role	Notes
2007	Whanau	Harley	
2007	Ebony Society	uncredited	Short film
2010	Redemption	Zig	Short film
2010	Boy	Juju	
2010	Kawa	Sebastian	
2011	Good for Nothing	Young Native American	
2012	The Most Fun You Can Have Dying	David	
2014	The Dead Lands	Mana	

=== Television ===
Year	Title	Role	Notes
2012	Spartacus: Vengeance	Tiberius / Nasir	Series regular: 9 episodes
2013	Spartacus: War of the Damned	Nasir	Series regular: 10 episodes
2014–2019	The Brokenwood Mysteries	Jared Morehu	Series regular: Series 1-6
2015–2020	Westside	Bert Thompson	Main role
2016	Dirty Laundry	Tane	
2017	Resolve	Chris Crean	
2019	The Gulf	Rory	Series regular
