= The Most Fun You Can Have Dying =

2012 film by Kirstin Marcon

- Theatrical release poster
- Directed by: Kirstin Marcon
- Screenplay by: Kirstin Marcon
- Based on: Seraphim Blues by Steven Gannaway
- Produced by: Alex Cole-Baker
- Starring: Matt Whelan; Roxane Mesquida; Pana Hema Taylor
- Cinematography: Crighton Bone
- Edited by: Peter Roberts
- Music by: Grayson Gilmour
- Production companies: Chocolate Fish Pictures; New Zealand Film Commission; DigiFilm; Southern Light Films; Heimatfilm; Ten Cent Pictures
- Distributed by: Rialto Distribution
- Release date: 26 April 2012
- Running time: 110 minutes
- Country: New Zealand
- Language: English

The Most Fun You Can Have Dying is a 2012 New Zealand romantic drama film written and directed by Kirstin Marcon and starring Matt Whelan, Roxane Mesquida and Pana Hema Taylor. The film is based on the 2003 novel Seraphim Blues by Steven Gannaway.

The film follows Michael, a university student who on being told he has only a few months to live decides to take his life into his own hands and enjoy every minute he has left. It was nominated for Best Film at the 2012 Sorta Unofficial New Zealand Film Awards.

== Plot ==
Michael lives in a run-down student flat in Hamilton, New Zealand, with his best friend David. Michael has been having medical tests and is given the shattering news that he has terminal liver cancer. Michael reacts by drinking excessively and hiding the news from his friends. Through the support Michael is offered by his friends, especially David, he begins to accept his prognosis. It is revealed via photographs that Michael's mother also died from cancer.

The community of Cambridge, a small town where Michael grew up, raise $200,000 in an attempt to save his life through a revolutionary medical programme in the United States. However, Michael is concerned about the side effects of the programme and the fact that it only has a 10% chance of working.

In a moment of honesty Michael confesses to David that he had a one-night stand with David's girlfriend. David is furious and storms off leaving Michael to his thoughts. Michael then makes the decision to leave New Zealand and see the world during his final few months.

Without telling anyone, Michael manages to scam the $200,000 and flees New Zealand, stopping in Hong Kong en route to London. He then descends into hedonism, drinking and spending his nights in seedy nightclubs. One night Michael hits on a woman only to have her boyfriend violently attack him. Bleeding and bruised Michael is awoken in alley by Sylvie and invites her for a coffee. When she asks "where?" he replies "how about Paris?".

Michael and Sylvie then begin to travel a snow-swept Europe taking in the sights in Paris, Munich, and Berlin. Initially the mysterious Sylvie rejects Michael's romantic overtures but after a short time they become lovers. Michael is rapidly becoming unwell and Sylvie confronts him about his illness. An emotional Sylvie reacts by picking up another man only to be discovered by Michael having sex with him. Michael is distraught and packs his bags to leave, only to calm down and eventually forgive Sylvie.

Sylvie is clearly troubled and we discover that she has recently suffered a miscarriage, the father being someone she had known sometime before Michael. Whilst travelling across Germany in a car, Sylvie and Michael start play-fighting, Sylvie then takes the wheel and unexpectedly wrenches the wheel causing them to deliberately crash.

Michael awakes in a German hospital to find Sylvie is dead and that he is to be arrested for fraud for his theft in New Zealand. He is also under suspicion for having caused the death of Sylvie. Michael is grief-stricken at Sylvie's death and later awakes to find David next to him who has flown from New Zealand to take him home. A sympathetic German doctor refuses to let the police arrest Michael and hints that he has to the morning to escape.

A seriously ill Michael and David flee the hospital and agree to one final session of partying before returning to New Zealand. The pair travel to Monaco and dress up formally to gamble in a casino. Michael persuades David to risk all their money on the roulette table and they end up winning hundreds of thousands of Euros. They return to their hotel with the intention of returning to New Zealand the next day. A critically ill Michael instead sneaks out of the hotel, leaving behind a note for the sleeping David and his father and travels to Venice.

In Venice Michael stares lovingly at a photo of his mother - taken in the same spot in Venice, and takes an overdose of his cancer drugs, washed down with copious amounts of wine. Michael dies looking out on a stunning Venice, leaving this world on his own terms.

== Cast ==
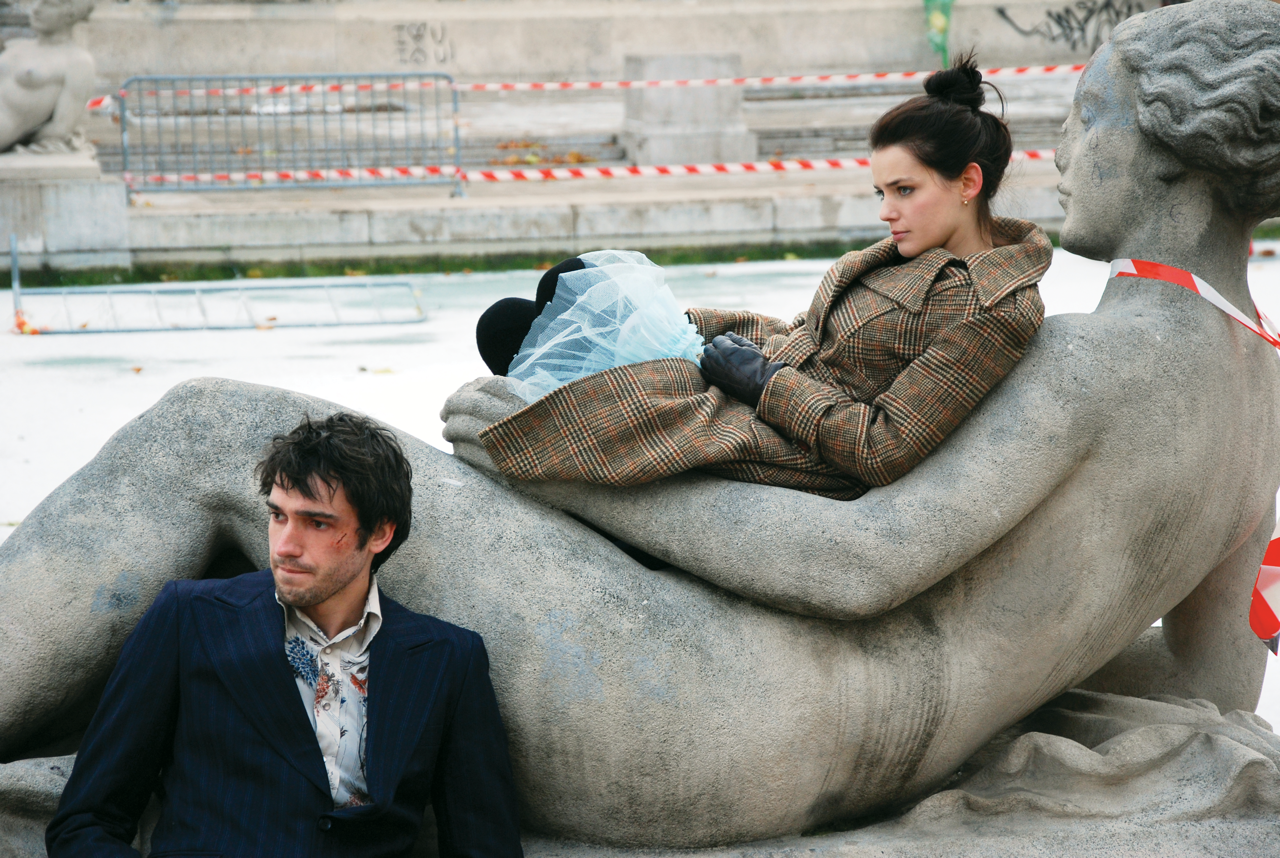
Matt Whelan and Roxane Mesquida

- Matt Whelan as Michael
- Roxane Mesquida as Sylvie
- Pana Hema Taylor as David
- Colin Moy as John
- Clementine Howe as Lizzy
- Caren Pistorius as Chloe
- Sophie Henderson as Tina
- Matthew J. Saville as Dr. Lake
- Arlo MacDiarmid as Jeff

== Soundtrack ==
The soundtrack of the film was released in 2012 by Flying Nun Records.

== Reception ==
Lydia Jenkin of The New Zealand Herald wrote that "this is one of the most memorable local films to emerge in a long time, with beautiful icy cold cinematography and characters of gravity and realism, but it's not one for the faint-hearted".

Helen Martin wrote that the film was "really striking, a great looking film, nicely edited, with beautifully composed and lit visuals (Europe in winter looks magical) and excellent production design".

Graeme Tuckett of Stuff wrote that "the film is a road trip, of sorts, a fantasy of youth and waste, and at times a thoughtful and quite incisive existential sketch of what it's like to hate yourself, when everyone around you thinks you're actually just fine".

At the 2012 Sorta Unofficial New Zealand Film Awards, the film won Best Cinematography and Best Production Design and was nominated for Best Picture, losing out to The Orator.
