= Gloria Bell =

2018 film by Sebastián Lelio

- Theatrical release poster
- Directed by: Sebastián Lelio
- Screenplay by: Alice Johnson Boher; Sebastián Lelio
- Story by: Sebastián Lelio
- Based on: Gloria by Gonzalo Maza; Sebastián Lelio
- Produced by: Juan de Dios Larraín; Pablo Larraín; Sebastián Lelio; Mark Levinson
- Starring: Julianne Moore; John Turturro; Michael Cera; Caren Pistorius; Brad Garrett; Jeanne Tripplehorn; Rita Wilson; Chris Mulkey; Sean Astin; Holland Taylor
- Cinematography: Natasha Braier
- Edited by: Soledad Salfate
- Music by: Matthew Herbert
- Production companies: FilmNation Entertainment; Fábula
- Distributed by: A24 (United States); Sony Pictures Releasing International; Stage 6 Films (Select territories)
- Release dates: September 7, 2018 (TIFF); March 8, 2019 (United States)
- Running time: 102 minutes
- Countries: United States; Chile
- Language: English
- Box office: $11.1 million

Gloria Bell is a 2018 comedy-drama film co-written and directed by Sebastián Lelio; it is an English language remake of his 2013 film Gloria. The film stars Julianne Moore, John Turturro, Michael Cera, Caren Pistorius, Brad Garrett, Jeanne Tripplehorn, Rita Wilson, Sean Astin, and Holland Taylor. It had its world premiere at the Toronto International Film Festival on September 7, 2018, and was theatrically released in the United States on March 8, 2019, by A24.

== Plot ==
Gloria Bell is a middle-aged divorcée living in Los Angeles. She has two children: Anne, a kindhearted yoga instructor, and Peter, an uninspired married man who cares for his infant son while his wife is away. Gloria spends her nights letting loose at dance clubs around the city that play 1970s and 1980s dance music.

One night, Gloria meets Arnold, also a divorcée, and they hit it off. They sleep together and begin a relationship shortly after. However, Gloria is annoyed when Arnold admits that he still financially supports his ex-wife and two daughters, who are unemployed and demanding. He owns a paintball arena and introduces her to the sport.

At Peter's birthday party, Gloria introduces Arnold to her children, ex-husband Dustin, and Dustin's wife Fiona. During a toast, Gloria unwittingly reveals that Anne is pregnant; the father is a Swedish wave rider and she plans to move to Sweden with him, which Dustin was not aware of.

Later, they look at old family photos including Gloria and Dustin's wedding pictures. The exes laugh at the old photos but Arnold, feeling left out, leaves unnoticed. When Gloria realizes Arnold has left, everyone goes looking for him before giving up. She leaves the party embarrassed.

Arnold repeatedly calls her, and finally catches up with her as she is leaving work. He attempts to justify his sudden exit from the party by claiming he tried initiating eye contact with her but her eyes were not looking for him. When Arnold again mentions his daughters' calls, Gloria blows him off. She tries to return his paintball guns but he refuses, so she drives away with them.

Gloria's mentally unstable neighbor leaves his marijuana on her doorstep one night, and, impulsively, she smokes it and goes dancing. The next day, she drives Anne to the airport for her trip to Sweden, tearfully accepting her daughter is grown up. Soon after, Gloria is told by a doctor that she will have to take prescription eyedrops for the rest of her life for her failing eyesight.

Gloria finally returns Arnold's calls and they arrange a trip to Las Vegas. As they are settling into their room, he again receives a call from his daughters, who inform him that his ex-wife injured herself walking through a sliding glass door. Despite his daughters' protests, Arnold refuses to cancel the trip, and he and Gloria have sex that night.

During a romantic dinner together, Gloria suggests that they take a trip to Spain. Arnold agrees; when Arnold's phone continues to ring, Gloria drops it in his soup. He excuses himself, saying he'll be right back. After some time passes, Gloria realizes that Arnold has deserted her and discovers he has checked out of their hotel room, leaving her without her luggage or a place to stay.

To drown her sorrows, Gloria dazedly drinks and gambles with random people, hooking up with their friend and experiencing a hallucinatory trip. She wakes up on a pool chair missing a shoe and calls her mother to take her home.

Arnold tries calling Gloria multiple times and she unplugs her phone in response. Coming across the paintball guns in her car trunk, she resolves to throw them away, but goes back to retrieve them at the last minute. Driving to Arnold's house, she silently shoots his house and him in anger. His ex-wife and daughters rush outside yelling obscenities, but Gloria remains unfazed and drives away, laughing with "Total Eclipse of the Heart" playing on her stereo.

At the wedding reception for the daughter of her friend Vicky, Gloria is asked to dance as the song "Gloria" starts to play, but she politely declines. Vicky coaxes her out, and Gloria changes her mind, gets on the dance floor and begins to lose herself in the music.

== Cast ==
- Julianne Moore as Gloria Bell, Dustin's ex-wife, Peter and Anne's mother, Hilary's daughter, Arnold's love interest and Vicky's friend.
- John Turturro as Arnold, Gloria's love interest.
- Michael Cera as Peter, Gloria and Dustin's son, Anne's brother and Hilary's grandson.
- Caren Pistorius as Anne, Gloria and Dustin's daughter, Peter's sister and Hilary's granddaughter.
- Brad Garrett as Dustin Mason, Gloria's ex-husband, Peter and Anne's father and Fiona's husband.
- Jeanne Tripplehorn as Fiona Mason, Dustin's new wife.
- Rita Wilson as Vicky, Gloria's friend.
- Chris Mulkey as Charlie.
- Barbara Sukowa as Melinda.
- Alanna Ubach as Veronica.
- Tyson Ritter as Neighbor.
- Cassi Thomson as Virginia.
- Sean Astin as Jeremy
- Holland Taylor as Hillary Bell, Gloria's mother and Peter and Anne's grandmother.

== Production ==
On May 12, 2017, it was reported that Sebastián Lelio would direct a reimagining of his 2013 film Gloria starring Julianne Moore. "As one of the greatest actresses in the world, Julianne giving her interpretation of the character is not only a huge honor, it's irresistible. It's going to be like jazz, you'll feel the spirit of the original story but it'll be re-invigorated and vital," said Lelio. On November 16, 2017, it was reported that the film had begun production. John Turturro, Michael Cera, Brad Garrett, Holland Taylor, and Caren Pistorius also joined the cast.

== Release ==
It had its world premiere at the Toronto International Film Festival on September 7, 2018. Prior to that, A24 had acquired U.S. distribution rights to the film. It was released on March 8, 2019.

== Reception ==
=== Box office ===
Gloria Bell grossed $5.6 million in the United States and Canada, and $5 million in other territories, for a worldwide total of $10.6 million.

The film made $145,218 from five theaters in its opening weekend, the second best per-venue average ($29,044) of the weekend behind the blockbuster Captain Marvel. In its third weekend, the film expanded to 654 theaters and made $1.7 million, finishing eighth.

=== Critical response ===
On review aggregator Rotten Tomatoes, the film holds an approval rating of 90% based on 207 reviews, with an average rating of 7.5/10. The website's critical consensus reads, "Free of visual or narrative embellishments, Gloria Bell rests almost completely on Julianne Moore's performance in the title role – and she's gloriously up to the task." Metacritic gave the film a weighted average score of 79 out of 100, based on 40 critics, indicating "generally favorable" reviews.

Gwilym Mumford of The Guardian gave the film four stars out of five, saying, "there's a warm universality here that is absorbing in its own right." Stephen Dalton of The Hollywood Reporter wrote: "Although he reconstructs the original film's narrative virtually scene by scene, Lelio strikes a more overtly comic note in Gloria Bell than in the original."

Peter Debruge of Variety called it "one of the great female-led films of the 21st century, passing the Bechdel test with flying colors — which explains why Moore would be so keen to remake it." Manohla Dargis of The New York Times wrote: "a transcendent Julianne Moore," the director "is acutely sensitive to the absurdities of everyday life, including the comedy of humiliation, both petty and wounding."

In contrast, some film critics criticized the remake's existence. On Mi Cine Tu Cine, a Mexican film review TV program, Alonso Díaz de la Vega called it "unnecessary", "burying the triumph of Paulina García and Sergio Hernández's performances" (the original version's protagonists) and "hiding the Latin American work" as a way in which Hollywood wants to tell how to get a notion of success; while Arantxa Luna and Jean-Christophe Berjon emphasized the change of actress, remarking Garcia's performance as "more fresh" and "more profound".

=== Accolades ===
Awards earned for Gloria Bell
| Award | Date of ceremony | Category | Recipient | Result | Ref. |
|---|---|---|---|---|---|
| AARP Movies for Grownups Awards | January 12, 2020 | Best Actress | Julianne Moore | Nominated | |
| California on Location Awards | December 15, 2019 | Location Team of the Year – Independent Feature Film | Michael Edward Smith, Eric Stangeland, Antonio J. Garcia, Brian J. Johnson | Nominated | |
| Satellite Awards | March 1, 2020 | Best Actress in a Motion Picture, Musical or Comedy | Julianne Moore | Nominated | |
