= Room of Death =

- Film poster
- Directed by: Alfred Lot
- Screenplay by: Alfred Lot
- Based on: La Chambre des morts by Franck Thilliez
- Produced by: Charles Gassot
- Starring: Mélanie Laurent; Éric Caravaca; Gilles Lellouche; Jonathan Zaccaï; Céline Sallette; Laurence Côte
- Cinematography: Jérôme Alméras
- Music by: Nathaniel Méchaly
- Distributed by: BAC Films
- Release date: 14 November 2007
- Running time: 115 minutes
- Country: France
- Language: French
- Budget: $7.9 million
- Box office: $1.1 million

Room of Death (French: La Chambre des morts) is a 2007 French crime film based on the novel La Chambre des morts by Franck Thilliez.

== Cast ==
- Mélanie Laurent as Lucie Hennebelle
- Éric Caravaca as Moreno / Pierre Norman
- Gilles Lellouche as Sylvain
- Jonathan Zaccaï as Vigo
- Céline Sallette as Annabelle
- Laurence Côte as Alex
- Jean-François Stévenin as Léon
- Fanny Cottençon as La mère de Lucie
- Nathalie Richard as Raphaelle
- Lola Créton as Eléonore
