= Anatomy of Hell =

2004 film by Catherine Breillat

- Theatrical release poster
- French: Anatomie de l'enfer
- Directed by: Catherine Breillat
- Screenplay by: Catherine Breillat
- Based on: Pornocratie by Catherine Breillat
- Produced by: Jean-François Lepetit
- Starring: Amira Casar; Rocco Siffredi
- Cinematography: Yorgos Arvanitis; Guillaume Schiffman
- Edited by: Pascale Chavance
- Production companies: Flach Film; CB Films
- Distributed by: Rézo Films
- Release dates: 23 January 2004 (Rotterdam); 28 January 2004 (France)
- Running time: 77 minutes
- Countries: France; Portugal
- Language: French
- Box office: $345,365

Anatomy of Hell (French: Anatomie de l'enfer) is a 2004 arthouse film written and directed by Catherine Breillat, based on her 2001 novel Pornocratie. According to Breillat, Anatomy of Hell is a "sequel" to Romance.

== Plot ==
A sad woman stumbles into a gay nightclub and looks at the gay men dancing on the floor. She later goes to the bathroom and slits her wrist. A gay man enters and stops her. He takes her to a doctor. The woman gives the gay man oral sex outside. She proposes a deal of making him watch her for four nights in exchange of money - but he cannot touch her and can only watch her impartially, to make sure he doesn't like women.

=== First night ===
The man comes to the woman's isolated villa as per the deal. He sits on a small chair as the woman gets naked and lies down on the bed. The man describes how the woman's flesh causes him disgust and points out many problems he has with women's anatomy.

The narrator then compares the pubic hair of a woman to a hatchling. In a flashback, a young boy is shown sitting on a tree, feeding worms to newborn hatchlings. He then takes one of the hatchlings and puts it in his pocket, climbs down the tree and then throws the bird on the ground and stomps on it repeatedly, killing it.

The woman starts masturbating. The man leaves the room and prepares a drink for himself and returns. She asks him to touch her. The man drinks the alcohol and touches her. In a flashback, the woman is shown as a little girl who is harassed by some boys, only to become friends with them. The boys play "Doctor" with the girl as she hides in the bushes and reveals her vagina. The boys laugh and make fun of it.

The gay man touches the woman's vagina and sees clear discharge on his finger. He then inserts the finger deeper, and the woman starts laughing. He suddenly pulls out the finger and explains why he prefers having sex with men to women. The man leaves. He smokes by the ocean, and comes back to find the woman asleep. He goes to her bathroom and finds a tube of lipstick, which he brings to the bed. While the woman is still asleep, the man pushes her legs from behind and draws a red circle around her anus, vagina and her lips with the lipstick. He gets naked and rapes the woman in her sleep, ejaculating inside her. The gay man sobs, as the woman wakes up and comforts him.

=== Second night ===
The gay man arrives at the villa again. The woman takes him into the bedroom. Before she can undress herself, the gay man undresses her and leaves as she settles in the bed. Meanwhile, he scours alcohol from the kitchen and sits on his usual seat, watching her as she sleeps. The gay man suddenly falls asleep on the bed, with his hands and head on the woman's thighs. He wakes up, adjusts the woman's legs and sniffs her vagina. She lays on her back as the gay man fingers her vagina and sees blood on his fingers, licking them.

He goes outside and brings a garden pitchfork. He inserts the wooden end of the pitchfork in the woman's vagina as she sleeps. The gay man falls asleep and wakes up in the morning. The woman describes the urges a man has to kill women. But, she says, the gay man can't kill her and knows nothing of it.

=== Third night ===
The woman asks the man to pull out her bloody tampon from her vagina. He pulls it out and she says how periods are considered a mark of impurity and even tampon-like devices were made by men who hate women. She puts her used tampon in a glass of water that reddens. She makes herself and the gay man drink the water.

=== Fourth night ===
The gay man, naked, inspects the woman's vagina closely as it pushes out a stone dildo. The man pushes it back in and out, pleasuring her. Fully erect, the gay man has sex with the woman. After ejaculation, the gay man and the woman kiss each other for the first time. As the gay man pulls his penis out of her vagina, menstrual blood gushes out. Later, the gay man masturbates with the blood still on his penis.

The gay man leaves for good as the deal has been completed, but he still thinks about her. At the bar, he chats with another man about the woman and berates her, describing his hatred for her, even as he declares that it was the most intimate relationship he had ever had. He leaves the money she gave him at the bar, not needing it anymore. The gay man returns to the woman's villa, wanting to rekindle the relationship. However, he finds her bedroom empty; just a sheet blotted with her menstrual blood.

At last, a scene is shown where the gay man pushes the woman off of a cliff and into the ocean, killing her.

== Cast ==
- Amira Casar as the woman
- Rocco Siffredi as the man
- Catherine Breillat as the narrator
- Alexandre Belin as blow-job lover 1
- Manuel Taglang as blow-job lover 2
- Jacques Monge as man in bar
- Claudio Carvalho as boy with the bird
- Carolina Lopes as little girl
- Diego Rodrigues (billed as 'Diogo Rodriques') as little boy playing doctor
- João Marques as little boy playing doctor
- Bruno Fernandes as little boy playing doctor
- Maria Edite Moreira as pharmacist 1
- Maria João Santos as pharmacist 2

== Production ==
The film was adapted by writer/director Breillat from her novel Pornocracy. The sexually explicit film stars Amira Casar as "the woman" and Rocco Siffredi as "the man". Leonard Maltin summarizes: "After attempting suicide in the bathroom of a gay disco, a woman hires the man who rescues her to spend four nights in her company, challenging him to 'watch me where I'm unwatchable'."

Breillat allowed Casar to use a body double in the explicit sex scenes. Siffredi's performance, however, is all his own work.

Siffredi recalled that when Breillat described one scene to him, she took his penis in her hand and explained to Casar how she should play the scene.

== Reception ==
The film polarized critics. Leonard Maltin gave the film zero stars and said the film was "homophobic" and "unintentionally funny". Roger Ebert stated: "I remember when hard-core first became commonplace, and there were discussions about what it would be like if a serious director ever made a porn movie. The answer, judging by Anatomy of Hell, is that the audience would decide they did not require such a serious director after all."

BBC film critic Jamie Russell gave the film four stars out of five:

"The plot is hardcore thin: a woman (Amira Casar) cruises a gay club and pays broody stud (porn star Rocco Siffredi) to spend four nights with her. A challengingly explicit delve into the female body (often quite literally), it's a unique cinematic example of feminist existential porn.... Yet perversely, it's also one of the most groundbreaking films in recent memory in terms of both the explicitness of its sexuality and its commitment to such an austere intellectual discourse. No wonder Rocco looks so shell-shocked: this is sex not as comedy, but as the deepest, darkest male nightmare."

The film went on to win Best Feature Film at the Philadelphia Film Festival.

On the review aggregator website Rotten Tomatoes, 26% of 35 critics' reviews are positive, with an average rating of 3.9/10. The website's consensus reads: "Ponderous, pretentious, and—considering the subject matter—dull." Metacritic, which uses a weighted average, assigned the film a score of 29 out of 100, based on 19 critics, indicating "generally unfavorable" reviews.
