= The Story Without a Name (novel) =

1882 novel by Jules Barbey d'Aurevilly

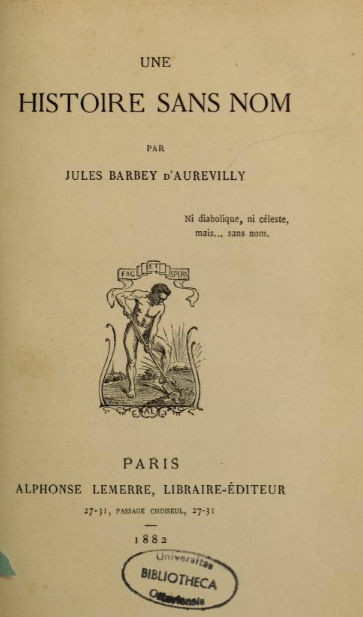
- Title page for Une histoire sans nom (1882)
- Author: Jules Barbey d'Aurevilly
- Original title: Une histoire sans nom
- Translator: Edgar Saltus
- Language: French
- Publisher: A. Lemerre
- Publication date: 1882
- Publication place: France
- English publication date: 1891
- Pages: 227

The Story Without a Name (French: Une histoire sans nom) is an 1882 novel by the French writer Jules Barbey d'Aurevilly. It tells the story of an inexplicable pregnancy and the destructive consequences it has for its surroundings.

An English translation by Edgar Saltus was published in 1891. Saltus, a writer associated with the decadent movement, took some liberties in his translation, and upon the original publication, several American critics thought the novel was his own work and that Barbey d'Aurevilly was his literary invention.
