= Sharko (novel) =

2017 novel by Franck Thilliez

- Author: Franck Thilliez
- Publication date: 2017

Sharko is a 2017 detective novel by French writer Franck Thilliez. The book is the 6th in the series featuring detectives Frank Sharko and Lucie Henebelle.
