= Sex Is Comedy =

2002 film by Catherine Breillat

- Theatrical release poster
- Directed by: Catherine Breillat
- Written by: Catherine Breillat
- Produced by: Jean-François Lepetit
- Starring: Anne Parillaud; Grégoire Colin; Roxane Mesquida; Ashley Wanniger
- Cinematography: Laurent Machuel
- Edited by: Pascale Chavance
- Production companies: Flach Film; CB Films; Arte France Cinéma; France Télévision Images 2
- Distributed by: Rézo Films
- Release dates: May 2002 (Cannes); 5 June 2002 (France)
- Running time: 95 minutes
- Countries: France; Portugal
- Languages: French; Portuguese

Sex Is Comedy is a 2002 comedy-drama film written and directed by Catherine Breillat. It revolves around a director (Anne Parillaud) and her troubles filming an intimate sex scene between two actors who cannot tolerate each other.

Based on Breillat's experiences directing her 2001 film Fat Girl, the climax of the film features a recreation of a scene from that film, shot from the point of view of the crew, with Roxane Mesquida essentially reprising her role from the first film.

== Cast ==
- Anne Parillaud as Jeanne
- Grégoire Colin as the actor
- Roxane Mesquida as the actress
- Ashley Wanniger as Léo

== Release ==
Sex Is Comedy was not chosen for the official selection at the 2002 Cannes Film Festival however, was selected as the opening night film of the Directors Fortnight.

== Reception ==
On review aggregator website Rotten Tomatoes, the film holds an approval rating of 68% based on reviews from 47 critics, with an average rating of 6.3/10. On Metacritic, the film has a weighted average score of 63 out of 100, based on 24 critics, indicating "generally favorable reviews".

Nev Pierce of BBC praised the direction by Catherine Breillat, writing "[She] does effectively capture the 'hurry up and wait' atmosphere of a film set, and draws excellent performances from all involved".

Ed Gonzalez of Slant Magazine called the film an "ego trip", while Roger Ebert of the Chicago Sun-Times said that the film is not sure "what it's really about, or how to get there", giving it 2 and a half stars out of 4.

According to John Anderson of the Chicago Tribune "It may be impossible ever to watch a sex scene again after seeing Catherine Breillat's Sex Is Comedy. And that may precisely be the point".

In a review for The A.V. Club, Scott Tobias wrote, "Sex Is Comedy triumphs mostly in laying out the specific mechanics of a love scene", while Ruthe Stein of San Francisco Chronicle criticized the film for being "[a]nnoying, soporific and, despite its title, singularly humorless".
