= Her Will Be Done =

- French: Que ma volonté soit faite
- Directed by: Julia Kowalski
- Written by: Julia Kowalski
- Produced by: Yuto Sakata; Kenji Yamada; Akito Yamamoto; Taichi Ito
- Starring: Roxane Mesquida; Raphaël Thiéry
- Cinematography: Simon Beaufils
- Edited by: Isabelle Manquillet
- Music by: Daniel Kowalski
- Production company: Grande Ourse Films
- Release date: May 16, 2025 (Cannes)
- Running time: 95 minutes
- Countries: France; Poland
- Languages: French; Polish

Her Will Be Done (French: Que ma volonté soit faite) is a 2025 drama film written and directed by Julia Kowalski and featuring Roxane Mesquida and Raphaël Thiéry.

== Cast ==
- Maria Wróbel
- Roxane Mesquida
- Wojciech Skibiński
- Kuba Dyniewicz
- Przemysław Przestrzelsk
- Raphaël Thiéry
- Jean-Baptiste Durand
- Eva Lallier Juan

== Release ==
The film was screened in the Directors' Fortnight at the 2025 Cannes Film Festival on May 16, 2025.

== Reception ==
=== Critical reception ===
Jessica Kiang of Variety gave the film a positive review and wrote, “And though it promises more than it ultimately delivers, mostly Kowalski’s sophomore title is a solid addition to the subgenre, developing into an intriguing mix of heady and earthy, in which folk-horror eeriness fuses with provincial narrow-mindedness, and mysticism oozes through the muck.”

=== Accolades ===
Award / Festival	Date of ceremony	Category	Recipient(s)	Result	Ref.
Sitges Film Festival	19 October 2025	Best Feature Film	Her Will Be Done	Nominated	
