= The School of Flesh =

1998 film

- Film poster
- Directed by: Benoît Jacquot
- Screenplay by: Jacques Fieschi
- Based on: 肉体の学校 (Nikutai no gakkō) by Yukio Mishima
- Produced by: Fabienne Vonier
- Starring: Isabelle Huppert; Vincent Martinez; François Berléand; Vincent Lindon; Jean-Claude Dauphin; Danièle Dubroux; Michelle Goddet; Bernard Le Coq; Roxane Mesquida; Jean-Louis Richard
- Cinematography: Caroline Champetier
- Edited by: Luc Barnier
- Distributed by: Pyramide Distribution
- Release dates: May 1998 (Cannes); 18 November 1998 (France)
- Running time: 110 minutes
- Country: France
- Language: French

The School of Flesh (French: L'École de la chair) is a 1998 French drama film directed by Benoît Jacquot, based on the 1963 novel Nikutai no gakkō by Yukio Mishima. It was entered into the 1998 Cannes Film Festival.

== Cast ==
- Isabelle Huppert as Dominique
- Vincent Martinez as Quentin
- Vincent Lindon as Chris
- Marthe Keller as Madame Thorpe
- François Berléand as Soukaz
- Danièle Dubroux as Dominique's Friend
- Bernard Le Coq as Cordier
- Roxane Mesquida as Marine
- Jean-Louis Richard as M. Thorpe
- Jean-Claude Dauphin as Louis-Guy
- Michelle Goddet as Quentin's Mother
- Jean-Michel as Marcus
- Pierre Laroche as Robert
- Richard Schroeder as The Photographer

== See also ==
- Isabelle Huppert on screen and stage
