= What Never Dies =

1884 novel by Jules Barbey d'Aurevilly

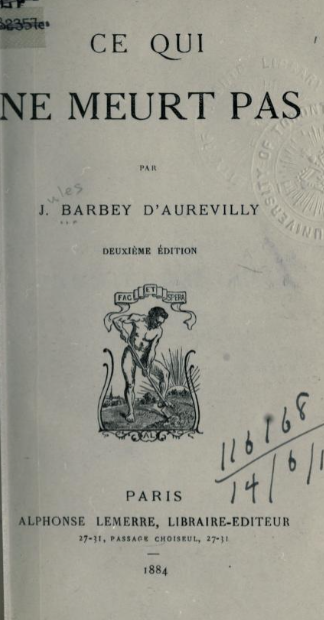
- Title page for Ce qui ne meurt pas (1884)
- Author: Jules Barbey d'Aurevilly
- Original title: Ce qui ne meurt pas
- Language: French
- Publisher: A. Lemerre
- Publication date: 1884
- Publication place: France
- English publication date: 1902
- Pages: 415

What Never Dies (French: Ce qui ne meurt pas) is an 1884 novel by the French writer Jules Barbey d'Aurevilly. It tells the story of the orphan Allan who falls in love with his protectress, Mme de Scudemot, who has become indifferent due to erotic excesses in her youth; Allan eventually marries his lover's daughter Camille, but has been smitten by the older woman's indifference. The book is divided into two parts, where the first focuses on Allan and Mme de Scudemot and the second on Allan and Camille.

The narrative uses techniques from the Gothic novel and its French counterpart, the "roman frénétique". The novel was written between 1833 and 1836, originally under the title Germaine ou La Pitié. It was the first full-length novel to be written by Barbey d'Aurevilly, although for a long time it was left unpublished. It was revised and published in 1884. An English translation was published in 1902, falsely attributed to Oscar Wilde under his pseudonym Sebastian Melmoth.

== Reception ==
In his 1967 monograph The Novels and Stories of Barbey D'Aurevilly, Brian G. Rogers wrote about What Never Dies: "Though liberally sprinkled with youthful errors, the novel is the first full-length work to reflect Barbey's enthusiasm for a world completely dominated by passion, and already his treatment of incipient attraction, passionate love and cold disillusion takes on a characteristic flavour. Here, not a single note rings false."
