= Slow West =

2015 film by John Maclean

- UK theatrical release poster
- Directed by: John Maclean
- Written by: John Maclean
- Produced by: Iain Canning; Michael Fassbender; Rachel Gardner; Conor McCaughan; Emile Sherman
- Starring: Kodi Smit-McPhee; Michael Fassbender; Ben Mendelsohn; Caren Pistorius; Rory McCann
- Cinematography: Robbie Ryan
- Edited by: Jon Gregory
- Music by: Jed Kurzel
- Production companies: DMC Film; Film4; New Zealand Film Commission; See-Saw Films
- Distributed by: Lionsgate (United Kingdom); Transmission Films; Madman Entertainment (New Zealand)
- Release dates: 24 January 2015 (Sundance); 21 May 2015 (New Zealand); 26 June 2015 (United Kingdom)
- Running time: 84 minutes
- Countries: United Kingdom; New Zealand
- Language: English
- Box office: $1.3 million

Slow West is a 2015 revisionist Western film written and directed by John Maclean in his directorial debut. It stars Kodi Smit-McPhee as a young Scotsman searching for his lost love in the American West, accompanied by a bounty hunter played by Michael Fassbender. It premiered at the 2015 Sundance Film Festival on 24 January 2015, where it was awarded the Sundance Institute's World Cinema Jury Prize: Dramatic Winner.

The film was first released on 15 May 2015 in the United States, with a simultaneous release on video on demand.

== Plot ==
Jay Cavendish, a young Scotsman, travels to the American West to search for his love, Rose Ross. He encounters a group of men chasing a Native American. An Irish bounty hunter, Silas Selleck, arrives and shoots the leader dead. Jay employs the bounty hunter for protection.

At a trading post, unbeknownst to Jay, Silas sees a wanted poster offering a $2,000 bounty for Rose and her father. He plans to use Jay to get to the bounty. Another bounty hunter, Victor the Hawk, also takes notice of the poster. Inside, a Swedish couple attempts a robbery which results in the deaths of the owner and the husband. Jay intervenes and shoots the wife. Silas and Jay gather provisions and leave, abandoning the couple's children outside.

In the past, Rose is aware of Jay's affection in Scotland, but only cares for him as a "little brother". Jay's uncle, Lord Cavendish, accidentally dies in an argument with John Ross, Rose's father. Rose and her father leave for America with a bounty on their heads.

In the present, Jay abandons Silas and proceeds alone, thinking him a "brute". He meets a travelling writer, Werner, who offers to accompany Jay. When Jay wakes the next morning, Werner has left, stealing Jay's horse and equipment. Silas finds Jay and returns Jay's horse and belongings, saying he ran into Werner while looking for Jay.

The pair meets Payne, the leader of Silas's old gang, which has taken in the Swedish children. Payne gives Silas and Jay an absinthe in a failed attempt to gather information about Rose and her father's whereabouts. While they are asleep, Silas and Jay share a dream of Silas and Rose living together with a child. They awaken to find that Payne has stolen their weapons. Silas reveals the bounty to Jay. They evade Payne's gang in a forest, where Jay is injured by Native Americans.

Rose and her father live in a nearby prairie, protected by a Native American called Kotori. Victor, disguised as a priest, tracks them down and kills Rose's father. After reaching the prairie, Silas ties Jay to a tree to keep him from harm. Silas rushes to the house to warn Rose of Payne's gang but is wounded by Victor. Payne and his men murder Victor and assault the house.

Jay frees himself and runs to the house. After Kotori and most of Payne's gang are killed in the fire fight, Rose realizes she has shot Jay in the confusion. While she comforts him, Payne enters the house. Rose, facing Jay (and with Payne behind her), is able, unbeknownst to Payne, to turn the pistol around so Jay can shoot at Payne, which Jay does, killing Payne. As Jay dies, Silas tells Rose that Jay loved her "with all his heart." Silas stays with Rose and the Swedish children.

== Cast ==
- Kodi Smit-McPhee as Jay Cavendish
- Michael Fassbender as Silas Selleck
- Ben Mendelsohn as Payne
- Caren Pistorius as Rose Ross
- Rory McCann as John Ross
- Edwin Wright as Victor the Hawk
- Michael Whalley as The Kid
- Andrew Robertt as Werner
- Madeleine Sami as Marimacho
- Brian Sergent as Peyote Joe
- Bryan Michael Mills as The Minstrel
- Kalani Queypo as Kotori
- Ken Blackburn as Josh McKenzie

== Production ==
On 19 September 2013, it was announced that Michael Fassbender, Kodi Smit-McPhee, and Ben Mendelsohn had joined the cast of Slow West, produced by Film4 Productions.

Principal photography commenced on 21 October 2013 in New Zealand, which stood in for the film's Colorado setting. The flashbacks set in the Scottish Highlands were filmed in Wester Ross. Maclean, who is Scottish, "felt the scenes in Scotland had to be shot there" and not in New Zealand.

== Reception ==
The film received critical acclaim upon its premiere at Sundance. On the review aggregator website Rotten Tomatoes, 92% of 138 critics' reviews are positive, with an average rating of 7.5/10. The website's consensus reads: "Slow West serves as an impressive calling card for first-time writer-director John M. Maclean—and offers an inventive treat for fans of the Western." On Metacritic, the film has a score of 73 out of 100, based on 27 reviews, indicating "generally favorable reviews".

Rodrigo Perez of The Playlist in his review said: "Slow-burning and simmering, Slow West knows how to kick the voltage into high gear." Bilge Ebiri of New York magazine gave the film a positive review, and said that it is "an absurdist, melancholy coming-of-age tale that jumps from odd comedy to striking violence to stirring reflection". Michelle Orange of SBS gave the film four-out-of-five stars, and said that "Slow West is defined by a kind of loving ambivalence—about its hero, its genre, and perhaps most of all about a landscape so harsh and so beautiful it almost makes a man hope to die."
