= Roxane Mesquida =

French actress

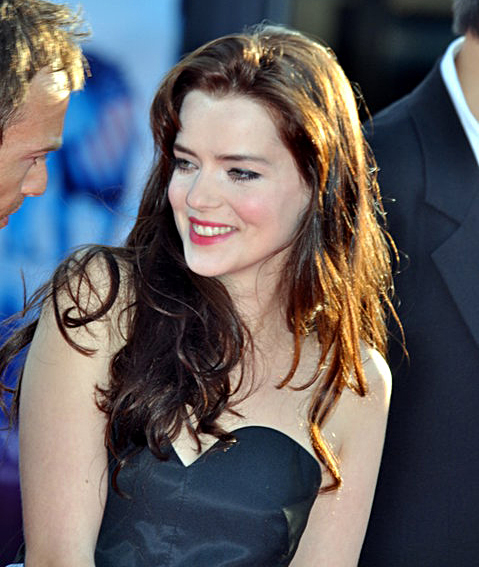
- Mesquida in 2010
- Born: 1 October 1981 (age 44); Marseille, Bouches-du-Rhône, France
- Occupations: Actress; model
- Years active: 1997–present
- Spouse: Frederic Da (m. 2011)
- Children: 2

Roxane Mesquida (born 1 October 1981) is a French actress and model based in Los Angeles.

== Early life ==
Mesquida grew up in Le Pradet, a little town located in southern France. Her mother, writer Françoise Mesquida, is French/Spanish and her father is Italian/American, but Mesquida never got to know him. Mesquida is fluent in English and French, and speaks Spanish, Italian and German.

== Career ==
=== Acting ===
She was discovered at the age of 11, while walking on a road with her mom, by French director Manuel Pradal who was in the middle of the casting process for his movie Marie from the Bay of Angels (Marie Baie des Anges) at the time. She took part in the shooting during the summer after their encounter.

In 1998, she also played opposite Isabelle Huppert in The School of Flesh (L'École de la Chair) by Benoît Jacquot. A few years later, she crossed paths with the renowned director who would make her well-known and, according to Roxane, who made her learn her craft: Catherine Breillat. First they collaborated in Fat Girl (À ma sœur !), then in Sex Is Comedy, and they worked together again in 2006's The Last Mistress, with Asia Argento.

In 2006, Mesquida played alongside Vincent Cassel in Sheitan, by Kim Chapiron, after which she decided to move to the United States. She spent several months in New York, where she attended The Barrow Group with Anne Hathaway, then settled in Los Angeles.

Mesquida then appeared in Kaboom by independent filmmaker Gregg Araki, as well as in Rubber by Quentin "Mr. Oizo" Dupieux. She also starred in Buck 65's music video "Paper Airplane", and in Gruff Rhys's, "Shark Ridden Waters".

From 2011 to 2012, Mesquida played Béatrice, the sister of Louis Grimaldi (Hugo Becker) in the fifth season of the American teen drama television series Gossip Girl. She also starred in the New Zealand film The Most Fun You Can Have Dying by Kirstin Marcon, as well as Kiss of the Damned by Alexandra Cassavetes, and Homesick by young independent filmmaker Frédéric Da. In 2012, she was cast in the Canadian action television series XIII: The Series, and appeared in Marilyn Manson's music video for "No Reflection".

=== Modeling ===
Mesquida has worked with photographers Karl Lagerfeld, Ellen von Unwerth for Russian Vogue, Corinne Day for French Vogue, she did the cover of Italian Vogue photographed by Paolo Roversi, the cover of French Playboy photographed by François Rotger, as well as the covers of British Asos, Crash magazine, Citizen K, Express Style, among many others. She appeared in magazines, such as Teen Vogue, Vanity Fair, Harper's Bazaar, Self Service, Rolling Stone, Italia, L'Uomo Vogue, Jalouse, L'Officiel, Above, Velvet, and No.

She appears in an art video for Opening Ceremony. She is the muse of shoe designer Jerome C. Rousseau.

== Style ==
Mesquida's style has been praised by the American edition of Vogue.

== Personal life ==
Following her collaboration with Mr. Oizo and Justice's Gaspard Augé in Rubber, Mesquida started DJing with American rapper MDNA in fashion events.

She lives in Charlie Chaplin's former house in West Hollywood.

She married musician and filmmaker Frederic Da in February 2011. They have a daughter, Lilya, and a son, Lou.

== Filmography ==
=== Film ===
Year	Title	Role	Notes
1997	Mary from the Bay of Angels	Mireille	
1998	The School of Flesh	Marine	
2000	Gaïa	—N/a	Short film
2001	Fat Girl	Elena Pingot	
2002	Âges ingrats	The young girl	Short film
2002	Sex Is Comedy	The actress	
2002	Very Opposite Sexes	Hélène	
2004	Le Grand Voyage	Lisa (photo and voice)	
2005	Les vagues	Célia	
2006	Sheitan	Ève	
2007	The Last Mistress	Hermangarde	
2009	La dérive	—N/a	
2010	Adieu Molitor	Jennifer	Short film
2010	Kaboom	Lorelei/Laura	
2010	Rubber	Sheila	
2010	Sennentuntschi	Sennentuntschi	
2010	Dans ta bouche	The girl from Los Angeles	Direct-to-DVD
2011	Quand j'étais gothique	Aurore	Short film
2012	The Most Fun You Can Have Dying	Sylvie	
2012	Kiss of the Damned	Mimi	
2013	Wrong Cops	Girl	
2013	The Doors	Liz	Short film
2014	Reality	Awards hostess	
2015	Our Futures	Virginie	
2015	Despite the Night	Lena	
2017	Hallucinaut	Beatrice	Short film
2017	Mercury in Retrograde	Isabelle	
2018	Homesick	Roxane	In post-production
2018	Burning Shadow	Summer	
2019	Play or Die	Chloe	
2025	Her Will Be Done	Sandra	
2026	I Want Your Sex	Yvette	

=== Television ===
Year	Title	Role	Notes
2002	Les paradis de Laura	Laura	Television film
2006	Mentir un peu	Irène	Television film
2011–2012	Gossip Girl	Béatrice Grimaldi	Recurring role; 3 episodes
2012	XIII: The Series	Betty Barnowsky	Main role (season 2); 12 episodes
2019	Now Apocalypse	Severine Bordeaux	Main role
