= Une vieille maîtresse =

Une vieille maîtresse (An old mistress) is an 1851 novel by the French writer Jules Barbey d'Aurevilly. It tells the story of a wayward dandy who falls in love with a young woman but is unable to fully leave his former mistress behind. The book was published by Alexandre Cadot in three volumes, with 327, 316 and 341 pages respectively. It was the basis for the 2007 film The Last Mistress directed by Catherine Breillat.
