= Brief Crossing =

2001 film by Catherine Breillat

- Directed by: Catherine Breillat
- Written by: Catherine Breillat
- Starring: Sarah Pratt; Gilles Guillain
- Cinematography: Eric Gautier
- Edited by: Pascale Chavance
- Release date: 5 September 2001
- Country: France

Brief Crossing (French: Brève traversée) is a French film released in 2001 and directed by Catherine Breillat. It stars Sarah Pratt and Gilles Guillain.

== Plot ==
The movie explores the viewpoints of two people at different stages in their lives and their attitudes toward sex and relationships. A virgin teenage boy with an eager, optimistic view of sex and an older woman who holds a bitter view of relationships meet on a ferry from France to Portsmouth. She tells him she has just left her husband. They spend the overnight journey together; talking, drinking, eating, and dancing. And become physically intimate.

== Production ==
Gilles Guillain was 18 at the time of filming, but still a virgin according to the director Catherine Breillat. In his sex scene with Sarah Pratt, Breillat told her head cameraman that all the sequence had to be filmed once, there had to be no repetition, because what would happen the first time would be "something really upsetting".
