= Fat Girl =

2001 film by Catherine Breillat

- Theatrical release poster
- French: À ma sœur!
- Directed by: Catherine Breillat
- Written by: Catherine Breillat
- Produced by: Jean-François Lepetit
- Starring: Anaïs Reboux; Roxane Mesquida; Libero De Rienzo; Arsinée Khanjian; Romain Goupil; Laura Betti
- Cinematography: Yorgos Arvanitis
- Edited by: Pascale Chavance
- Music by: Fabrice Nguyen Thai; Jean-Paul Jamot
- Production companies: Flach Film; CB Films; Arte France Cinéma; Immagine & Cinema; Urania Pictures
- Distributed by: Rezo Films (France); Istituto Luce (Italy)
- Release dates: 10 February 2001 (Berlin); 7 March 2001 (France); 15 June 2001 (Italy)
- Running time: 86 minutes
- Countries: France; Italy
- Languages: French; Italian; English
- Box office: $765,705

Fat Girl (French: À ma sœur!, lit. 'To My Sister!') is a 2001 coming-of-age drama film written and directed by Catherine Breillat, and starring Anaïs Reboux and Roxane Mesquida. It was released in certain English-speaking countries under the alternative titles For My Sister and Story of a Whale. The film's plot follows two young sisters as they deal with coming-of-age, sibling rivalry, and desire while on vacation with their family.

== Plot ==
Twelve-year-old Anaïs and her fifteen-year-old sister, Elena, are vacationing with their parents in the French seaside town of Les Mathes. Bored of staying in their vacation home, the two walk into town while discussing relationships and their virginities. Although the conventionally attractive Elena has been promiscuous, she is saving vaginal intercourse for someone who loves her, while overweight Anaïs would rather lose her virginity to a man she does not love.

They meet an Italian law student, Fernando, at a cafe. Later, Fernando sneaks into the girls' bedroom for a liaison with Elena. Anaïs is awake and watches their entire interaction. After a conversation about Fernando's previous relationships with other women, Elena consents to have sex with him but backs out at the last minute. Frustrated, Fernando pressures her through various means, including threatening to sleep with another woman just to relieve himself. Finally, Elena is coerced into anal sex as a "proof of love", although it is obviously a painful experience for her.

In the morning, Fernando asks for oral sex from Elena before he leaves, but Anaïs has had enough and tells them to let her sleep in peace. The next day, the girls and Fernando go to the beach. Anaïs sits in the ocean in her new dress and sings to herself while Elena and Fernando go off alone together. Later, as the girls are reminiscing together back at the house about their childhood, Elena reveals Fernando gave her an engagement ring while at the beach. Anaïs openly expresses her suspicions about Fernando's intentions. That night, Elena has vaginal sex, which she considers losing her virginity, with Fernando as Anaïs silently cries on the other side of the room.

Fernando's mother comes by the next day and asks for the return of the ring Fernando gave to Elena, as it belongs to her and is part of a collection of jewelry from past lovers that she keeps. On discovering Elena and Fernando's relationship, her mother angrily decides to drive back to their home in Paris. On the way back, she becomes tired and decides to sleep at a rest stop, where a man smashes the windshield of their car with an axe, kills Elena, and strangles their mother while ripping her clothes. When Anaïs exits the car and starts backing away, he takes Anaïs into the woods and rapes her. When the police arrive the next morning, Anaïs insists she was not raped.

== Cast ==
- Anaïs Reboux as Anaïs Pingot
- Roxane Mesquida as Elena Pingot
- Libero De Rienzo as Fernando
- Arsinée Khanjian as Mrs. Pingot
- Romain Goupil as François Pingot
- Laura Betti as Fernando's mother
- Albert Goldberg as the killer

== Production ==
Catherine Breillat's experience during principal photography inspired her 2002 film Sex Is Comedy, which revolves around shooting a sex scene from the film. Mesquida reprised the scene for the later film. Principal photography took place in Les Mathes, France from late 1999 to early 2000.

Breillat revealed she was concerned about censorship because Anaïs's breasts are displayed in the final scene of the film. "I actually wanted her not to have breasts, but her body changed between casting and the end of shooting. It's funny that, if she had been flat-chested, it wouldn't have been an issue", Breillat said.

== Reception ==
=== Critical response ===
The film received generally positive reviews from critics. On the review aggregator website Rotten Tomatoes, the film holds an approval rating of 74% based on 87 reviews, with an average rating of 6.5/10. The website's critics consensus reads, "The controversial Fat Girl is an unflinchingly harsh but powerful look at female adolescence." Metacritic, which uses a weighted average, assigned the film a score of 77 out of 100, based on 24 critics, indicating "generally favorable" reviews.

Fat Girl got an "A" from Lisa Schwarzbaum of Entertainment Weekly and was called a "startling vision of the prickly crawlspace between innocence and sexual awakening" by Ed Gonzalez of Slant Magazine. Carla Meyer of the San Francisco Chronicle wrote the film "[e]xposes the less sexy things that lust can awaken, like viciousness, deceit and amoral longing".

Stephen Holden of The New York Times wrote, "Reboux's extraordinary performance conveys Anaïs's mixture of precocious insight, animal canniness and vulnerability so powerfully that it ranks among the richest screen portrayals of a child ever filmed". In a review for Chicago Sun-Times Roger Ebert wrote, "There is a jolting surprise in discovering that this film has free will, and can end as it wants, and that its director can make her point, however brutally", giving it 3 and a half stars.

David Stratton of Variety praised the cinematography by Yorgos Arvanitis, calling the film "beautifully photographed and framed". Neil Smith of BBC said that "Breillat has fashioned another characteristically raw and honest portrait of sexual relations".

=== Accolades ===
In 2001, the film won the Manfred Salzgeber Award at the 51st Berlin International Film Festival and the France Culture Award at the 2001 Cannes Film Festival.

== Controversy ==
Fat Girl was initially banned in the Canadian province of Ontario by the Ontario Film Review Board in late 2001 due to objections regarding the frank representation of teenage sexuality. Wheeler Winston Dixon described the film as a "harrowing tale of a 13-year-old girl's coming of age as her 15-year-old sister embarks on a series of sexual relationships", featuring "explicit sexual scenes" in a "brutal narrative structure." The ban in the province was eventually overturned and the film played in several theatres there in 2003.

In the United Kingdom, the British Board of Film Classification (BBFC) approved the uncut film for cinema release, but for the video release ordered the removal of the final rape scene where Anaïs appears to consent to being raped: "Cut required to scene of sexual assault on young girl, [...] to address the specific danger that video enables the scene to be used to stimulate and validate abusive action". In contrast to viewing the film in the cinema, where users cannot reuse the images they are seeing, the BBFC was concerned that at home "the rape sequence could potentially be used by paedophiles to 'groom' their victims" by demonstrating to children how to submit to rape. As Douglas Keesey explains, "in the midst of the rape, Anaïs stops trying to push the rapist off with her arms and instead puts them around his shoulders in an embrace. If our point of identification in the scene is Anaïs, has she just moved from fighting to acceptance of the rape? It could be argued that she 'acquiesces' solely to ensure her survival, but one can see how the BBFC might be concerned about a paedophile viewer showing Anaïs' embrace of her rapist to a potential victim as a model of how to consent to rape. This concern is only heightened right after this scene when we find out that Anaïs herself claims that she 'wasn't raped'."
