= Charley Palmer Rothwell =

English actor (born 1992)

- Born: 9 February 1992 (age 34); Bethnal Green, London, England
- Other name: Charley Palmer Merkell
- Occupation: Actor
- Years active: 2012–present
- Parents: Alfie Rothwell (father); Patsy Palmer (mother)

Charley Palmer Rothwell (born 9 February 1992) is an English actor. He is the son of EastEnders actress Patsy Palmer.

== Early life ==
Rothwell was born on 9 February 1992 in Bethnal Green, London. He is the son of actress Patsy Palmer and boxer Alfie Rothwell. He has three half-siblings, from his mother's side.

== Filmography ==
=== Film ===
Year	Title	Role
2014	The Guvnors	Trey
2015	Legend	Leslie Holt
2017	iBoy	Eugene
2017	Dunkirk	Corporal
2017	Beast	Leigh Dutot
2019	Play or Die	Lucas
2019	Looted	Rob
2022	The Other Fellow	Johannes Schäfer
2023	Femme	Jack
2024	Midas Man	George Martin

=== Television ===
Year	Title	Role	Notes
2013	Mayday	Jaden	Credited as Charley Palmer Merkell
2014	Casualty	Leo Wren	2 episodes; credited as Charley Palmer Merkell
2014	Our Girl	Baz Vegas	5 episodes
2016	Ripper Street	Redskin Jake	1 episode
2023	The Tower	Mark/Matthew Brannon	Main character
2023–2025	Big Boys	Cousin Mark	2 episodes
2024	A Gentleman in Moscow	Pulonov	3 episodes
