= The Last Mistress =

- theatrical poster
- Directed by: Catherine Breillat
- Written by: Catherine Breillat
- Based on: Une vieille maîtresse by Jules Barbey d'Aurevilly
- Produced by: Jean-François Lepetit
- Starring: Asia Argento; Fu'ad Aït Aattou; Roxane Mesquida
- Cinematography: Yorgos Arvanitis
- Edited by: Pascale Chavance
- Distributed by: StudioCanal
- Release dates: 25 May 2007 (Cannes Film Festival); 30 May 2007 (France)
- Running time: 104 minutes
- Countries: France; Italy
- Language: French
- Budget: $5.7 million
- Box office: $1.8 million

The Last Mistress (French: Une vieille maîtresse, literally "An old mistress") is a 2007 French-Italian film based on the novel Une vieille maîtresse by the French writer Jules Barbey d'Aurevilly. It stars Asia Argento and Fu'ad Aït Aattou as the two main characters. The movie was directed by the French filmmaker Catherine Breillat and was selected for the 2007 Cannes Film Festival.

== Plot ==
In 1835 Paris, the Vicomte de Prony visits a beautiful kept woman of Malagan birth, La Vellini. He tells her that her longstanding affair with libertine Ryno de Marigny must come to an end, as Ryno is to be married. On his way out, he encounters Ryno, who has resolved to visit his mistress one more time. After they have sex, Ryno tells Vellini that their relationship is finished; Vellini is doubtful. Elsewhere, the Marquise de Flers, grandmother of Ryno's bride-to-be, and the Comtesse d'Artelles, her friend and the wife of Vicomte de Prony, discuss the upcoming nuptials: the Marquise arranged the marriage, and believes that the union will benefit both Ryno and his innocent bride, Hermangarde, while d'Artelles expresses doubt that the penniless Ryno will escape his libertine past. As she leaves, she tells the Marquise that Ryno has had a mistress for a decade. Ryno visits his bride-to-be and her grandmother; after she sends Hermangarde to bed, she compels Ryno to tell her the whole truth of his relationship with Vellini before she can give her final blessing.

A decade earlier, Ryno lives the carefree life of a young aristocratic libertine in Baden. One of his friends introduces him to La Vellini, the wife of an elderly, wealthy baronet, Sir Reginald. Ryno quickly falls madly in love with Vellini, who scorns and mocks him. On a ride in the Bois de Boulogne, Ryno encounters Vellini and attempts to kiss her. Her husband, aghast, challenges him to a duel. Ryno delopes in an attempt to end the duel, but Sir Reginald shoots him anyway, badly wounding him. As Ryno is operated on, Vellini appears and licks the blood from his wound, initiating a torrid affair. For the next two years, as Ryno convalesces, Vellini visits him, and eventually leaves her husband, causing a stir in the Parisian scene. Once he recovers, the couple moves to Algeria, where they live together and have a daughter. Their daughter dies after being stung by a scorpion, throwing the couple into a mad grief. They have sex next to their daughter's pyre. Back in France, Vellini and Ryno acknowledge their mutual loathing over their daughter's death, but the tragedy continues to irresistibly draw them together. Eventually, Ryno falls out of love with Vellini.

Satisfied by his story, the Marquise allows the marriage to take place. As promised, Ryno and his bride move away from Paris, to a castle on the Norman coast. There, they enjoy a few months of conjugal bliss, and Hermangarde becomes pregnant. However, one day as Ryno takes a solitary walk, Vellini appears (having followed the couple to Normandy), telling him that he must either kill or kiss her. They kiss. The affair is reignited while Hermangarde mostly stays in the castle due to her pregnancy; however, her dread grows after she notices Vellini loitering near the castle. One night, she walks to Vellini's house, where she finds her husband and Vellini having sex. The next morning, she miscarries.

Some time later, in Paris, the Vicomte tells the Comtesse that Ryno has returned to regularly and openly visiting Vellini, apathetic to his wife. The tut-tutting Comtesse expresses relief that the Marquise de Flers has died and must not witness the state of the couple.

== Cast ==
- Asia Argento as La Vellini
- Fu'ad Aït Aattou as Ryno de Marigny
- Roxane Mesquida as Hermangarde
- Claude Sarraute as la marquise de Flers
- Yolande Moreau as la comtesse d'Artelles
- Michael Lonsdale as le vicomte de Prony
- Anne Parillaud as Mme de Solcy
- Jean-Philippe Tessé as le vicomte de Mareuil
- Sarah Pratt as la comtesse de Mendoze
- Amira Casar as Mademoiselle Divine des Airelles
- Lio as The singer
- Isabelle Renauld as l'arrogante
- Léa Seydoux as Oliva
- Nicholas Hawtrey as Sir Reginald
- Caroline Ducey as la dame de Pique
- Jean-Claude Binoche as le comte de Cerisy
- Thomas Hardy as le valet de Mareuil
- Jean-Gabriel Mitterrand as le valet de Rigny
- Eric Bouhier as le chirurgien
- Frédéric Botton as le cardinal de Flers

== Critical reception ==
The movie was well received by the critics. It appeared on some critics' top 10 lists of the best films of 2008. Stephen Holden of The New York Times named it the fifth best film of the year, and Sheri Linden of The Hollywood Reporter named it the ninth best.

Rotten Tomatoes reports that 77% of 98 critics gave the film a positive review, for an average rating of 6.7/10. The site's consensus states that "More complicated than your average bodice ripper, Catherine Breillat's Last Mistress features beautiful costumes, wrought romances, and a feral performance from Argento." Metacritic gave the film a score of 78 out of 100, based on 25 critics.
