= Nuit de chien =

Nuit de Chien
- Directed by: Werner Schroeter
- Written by: Juan Carlos Onetti (novel); Gilles Taurand; Werner Schroeter
- Produced by: Paulo Branco; Frieder Schaich
- Starring: Pascal Greggory; Bruno Todeschini; Amira Casar
- Cinematography: Thomas Plenert
- Edited by: Peter Przygodda; Bilbo Calvez; Julia Gregory
- Music by: Eberhard Kloke
- Release date: 2008
- Countries: Portugal; Germany; France
- Language: French

Nuit de Chien (This Night) is a 2008 French-German-Portuguese drama film directed by Werner Schroeter. It is based on the novel Para esta noche by Juan Carlos Onetti. It was entered into the competition at the 65th Venice International Film Festival. It is schroeter's last movie

== Cast ==
- Pascal Greggory as Ossorio
- Bruno Todeschini as Morasan
- Amira Casar as Irene
- Éric Caravaca as Villar
- Nathalie Delon as Risso
- Marc Barbe as Vargas
- Jean-François Stévenin as Martins
- Bulle Ogier as D. Inês
- Laura Martin-Bassot (as Laura Martin) as Victoria
- Filipe Duarte as Júlio
- Sami Frey as Barcala
- Elsa Zylberstein as Maria de Souza
- Isabel Ruth
- Laura Soveral
- Teresa Tavares
