= The Bewitched =

1852 novel by Jules Barbey d'Aurevilly

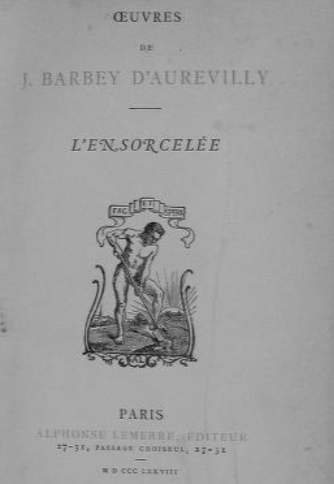
- Author: Jules Barbey d'Aurevilly
- Original title: L'Ensorcelée
- Translator: Louise Collier Willcox
- Language: French
- Publisher: Journal l'Assemblée nationale
- Publication date: 1852
- Publication place: France
- English publication date: 1928
- Pages: 336

The Bewitched (French: L'Ensorcelée) is an 1852 novel by the French writer Jules Barbey d'Aurevilly. It is set in Normandy in the early 19th century. In the story, a young married woman falls in love with a priest and commits suicide when the infatuation comes to nothing. Her widowed husband, who had been ruined by the French Revolution, then sets out to kill the priest out of jealousy.

The novel was the first in a suite of three novels which were set in Normandy and rooted in local folklore and legend. It was serialised in Journal l'Assemblée nationale in 1852 and published as a book in 1854. An English translation by Louise Collier Willcox was published in 1928.

== Reception ==
Brian G. Rogers wrote in his 1967 book on Barbey d'Aurevilly: "L'Ensorcelée, with its real and symbolic landscapes, its well-organised plot and its regionalistic flavour, is one of Barbey d'Aurevilly's most successful novels. Largely free from the repetitions and stylistic errors of the earlier works, it inaugurates the Normandy cycle with a flourish, and, with its parallel themes of passionate and 'satanic' possession, provides a further commentary on its author's evolving attitude to his continuing preoccupations."

== Adaptation ==
The novel was the basis for a 1981 television film titled L'Ensorcelée. The film was directed by Jean Prat and starred Julie Philippe and Jean-Luc Boutté. It was produced for Antenne 2.
