= Éléonore Faucher =

French film director and screenwriter (1973–2023

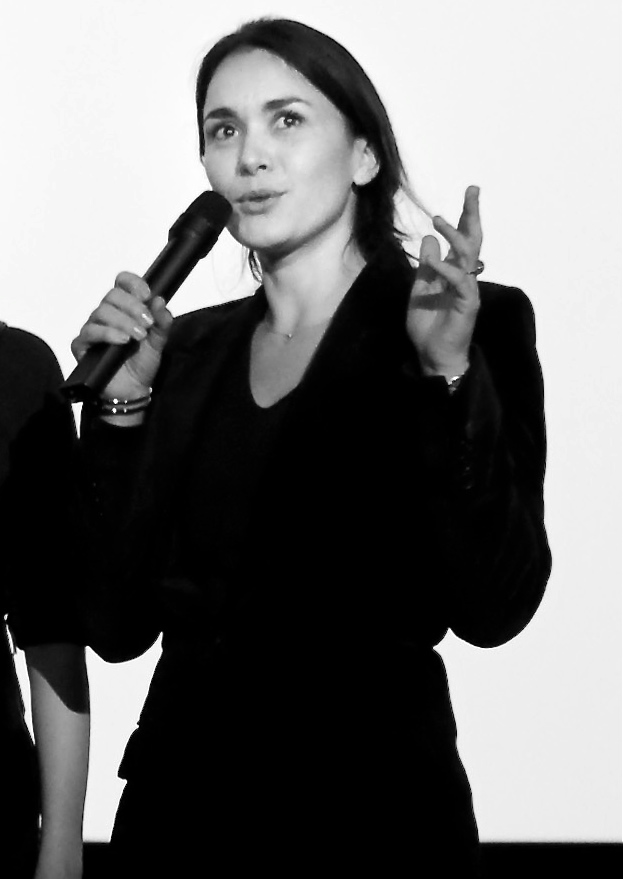

Eléonore Faucher (10 January 1973 – 27 August 2023) was a French film director and screenwriter. She is best known for directing the film A Common Thread.

== Personal life ==
Faucher was born in Nantes on 10 January 1973, and died of cancer on 27 August 2023, at the age of 50.

== Filmography ==
Year	Title	Credited as		Notes
Year	Title	Director	Screenwriter	Notes
1996	Les toilettes de Belle-Ville	Yes	Yes	Short
1998	Ne prends pas le large	Yes	Yes	Short
2004	A Common Thread	Yes	Yes	
2009	Gamines	Yes	Yes	
2013	Les déferlantes	Yes	Yes	TV movie
2019	La maladroite	Yes		TV movie
2022	Et la montagne fleurira	Yes	Yes	TV mini-series
