= Kirstin Marcon =

New Zealand screenwriter and film director

Kirstin Marcon is a New Zealand screenwriter and film director.

Her debut feature film as writer and director The Most Fun You Can Have Dying was shot in Europe (London, Paris, Monaco, Milan, Munich, Berlin, Venice) and New Zealand (Auckland, Hamilton) in 2010/11 and is financed by the New Zealand Film Commission. It stars Roxane Mesquida, Matt Whelan and Pana Hema-Taylor. Based on the novel Seraphim Blues by Steven Gannaway, it is produced by Alex Cole-Baker and executive produced by Tim White.

Her 35mm short (writer & director) Picnic Stops, was made in association with the New Zealand Film Commission, and was selected for Competition and Official Selection at a number of festivals including the Hof International Film Festival, Germany (2004), Expression en Corto International Film Festival, Mexico (2005), and the 27th International Women's Film Festival of Créteil, France, 2005.

Her debut 35mm short film as writer & director, She's Racing was made in association with the New Zealand Film Commission in 2000. It screened in competition at Edinburgh Film Festival, Torino Film Festival, and Chicago International Film Festival (where it won a Silver Plaque). It also screened at Telluride Film Festival, with Australian indie film Chopper.

Marcon studied filmmaking at Waikato Polytechnic in the 1990s.

== Filmography ==
Writer and Director

- The Most Fun You Can Have Dying (2012)
- Picnic Stops (2005)
- She's Racing (2000)
