= Franck Thilliez =

French writer (born 1973)

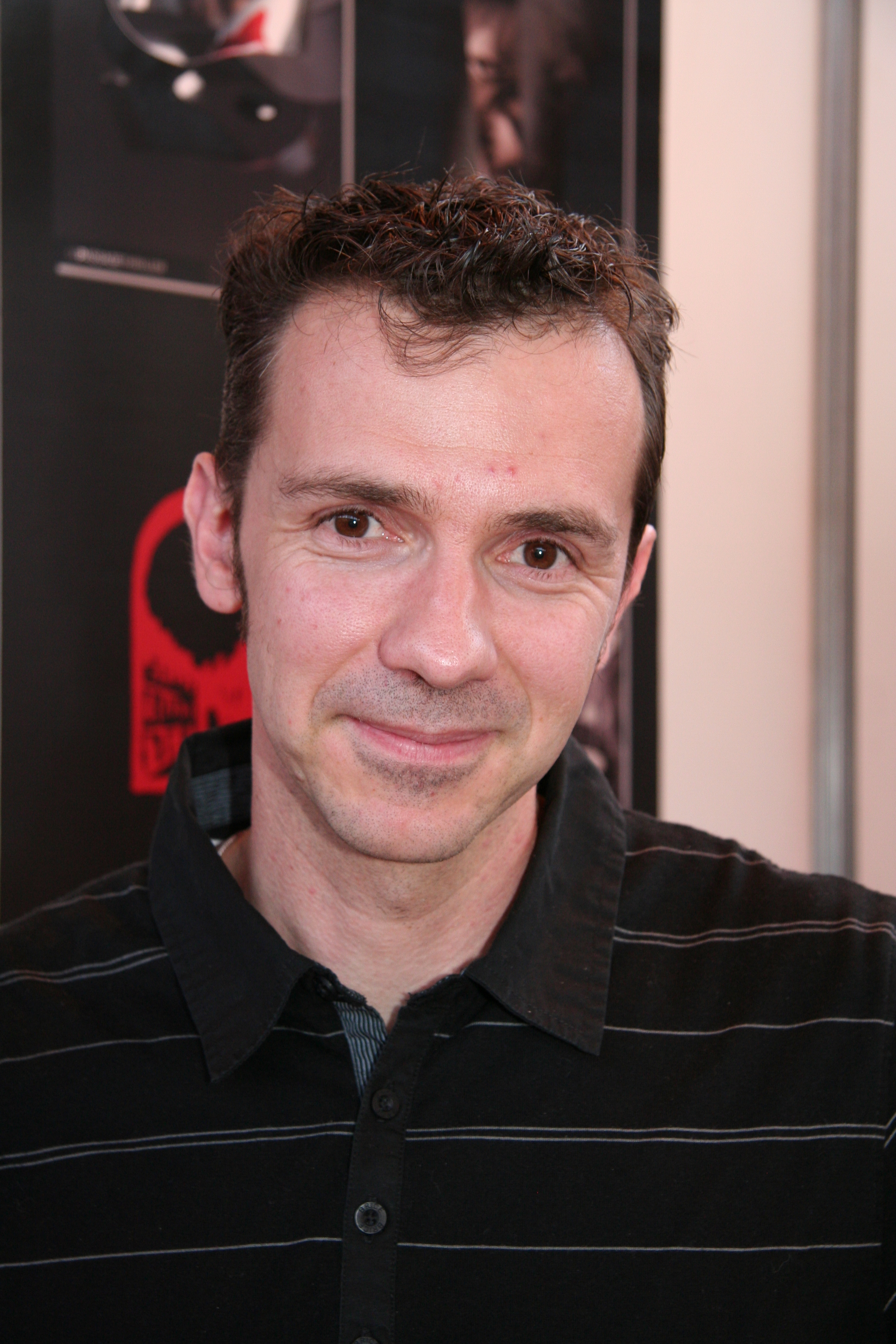
Franck Thilliez (2009)

Franck Thilliez (born 15 October 1973 in Annecy) is a French writer. Thilliez was a computer engineer for a decade before he began writing. His book La Chambre des morts was made into a film in 2007.

== Accolades ==
La Chambre des morts won the SNCF French Thriller Prize and the Quais du polar readers' prize in 2006, while Angor was voted best thriller of 2014 and won him the Étoiles du Parisien-Aujourd'hui en France award. The author also won the Prix Mireille-Lantéri from the Société des auteurs et compositeurs dramatiques (SACD).

== Selected works ==
- La Chambre des morts (French Edition) (2005)
- Deuils De Miel (French Edition) (2010)
- La Memoire Fantome (French Edition) (2010)
- GATACA (Édition de Noyelles) (2011)
- Syndrome E: A Thriller (Viking Press, 2012)
- Bred to Kill: A Thriller (Viking Press, 2015)
- Sharko (2017)
