= Catherine Breillat =

French filmmaker (born 1948)

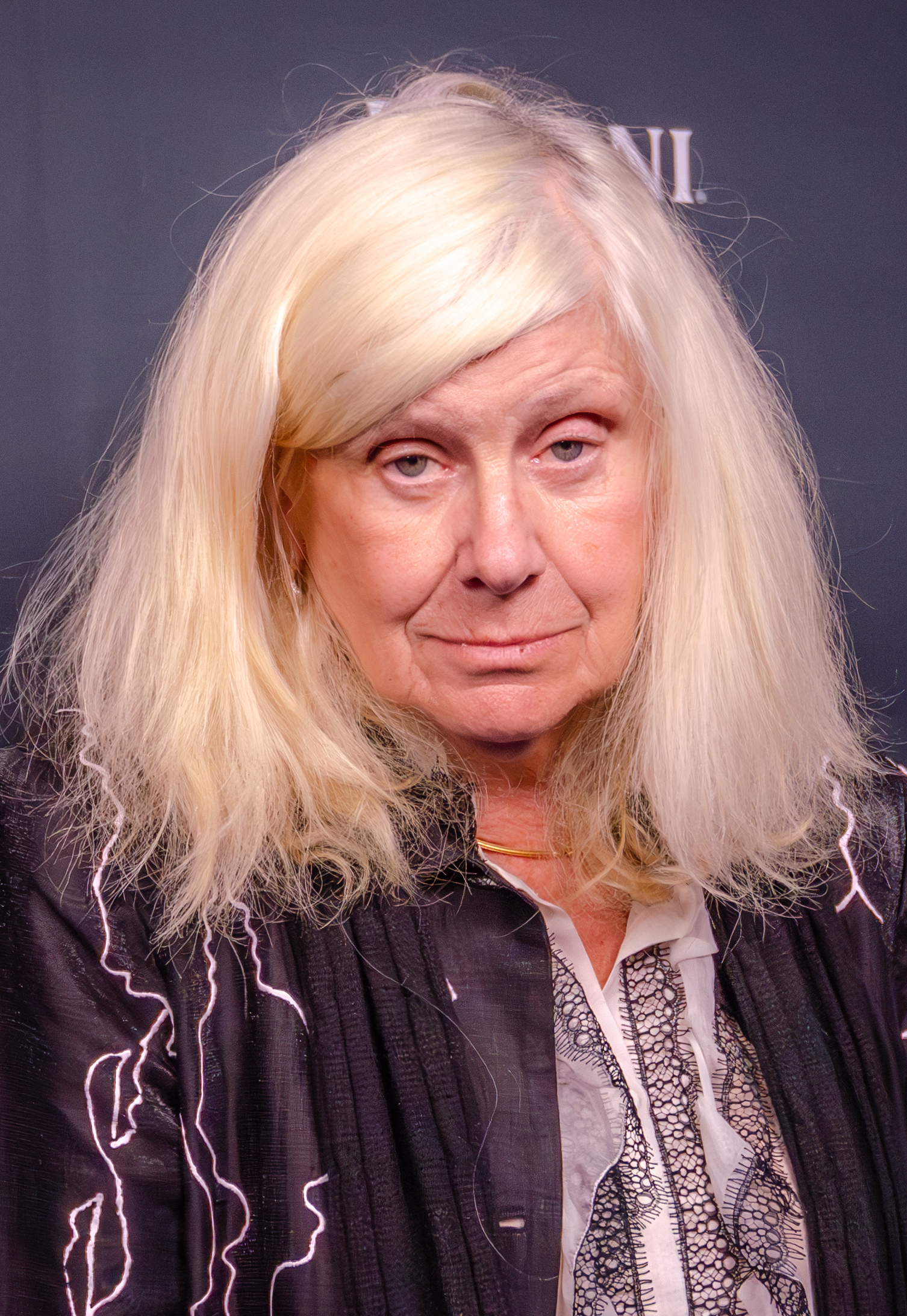
- Breillat in 2023
- Born: 13 July 1948 (age 78); Bressuire, Deux-Sèvres, France
- Occupations: Film director, screenwriter, novelist

Catherine Breillat (French: [katʁin bʁɛja]; born 13 July 1948) is a French filmmaker, novelist, and professor of cinema at the European Graduate School.

== Early life ==
Breillat was born 13 July 1948 in Bressuire, Deux-Sèvres, France, to her father, Auzay-born Marcel Breillat, a doctor, and her mother Marie-Jeanne Meillan. Her older sister Marie-Hélène Breillat, born 2 June 1947, is an author, painter, and actress. Catherine has stated that, in her adolescence, her family would "diminish" her, and that her mother hated female children. (Note: Breillat has stated that her mother has been as "atrocious" to her first-born daughter as she has been with her, saying "I don’t remember having loved my mother." See Joudet (2025).)

Raised in the intensely religious environment of Niort and her family, she found refuge in the town library. She decided to become a writer and film director at the age of twelve after watching Ingmar Bergman's Sawdust and Tinsel, believing she had found her "fictional body" in Harriet Andersson's character, Anna.

== Career ==
Breillat studied acting at Yves Furet's Studio d'Entraînement de l'Acteur (Actor's Training Studio) in Paris, together with her sister Marie-Hélène. At 16 years of age, she wrote her first novel, L'homme facile (A Man for the Asking), about a young woman subjugated by a man's fantasies. It was published in 1968 by Christian Bourgois and was immediately banned for readers under 18. In 1972, she attained her first film acting role in Bernardo Bertolucci's Last Tango in Paris, as a young dressmaker.

Turning to screenwriting, in 1975 she co-wrote the screenplay for the sex comedy film Catherine & Co. with Léo L. Fuchs, based on the eponymous 1967 novel by Edouard de Segonzac. The film follows a young British sex worker who moves to Paris and creates an escort agency. It features Jane Birkin, Patrick Dewaere, and Jean-Claude Brialy.

In 1975, Breillat wrote and directed her first film, Une vraie jeune fille (A Real Young Girl), using a porn crew. The film starred then 21-year-old British actress Charlotte Alexandra and 31-year-old American actor Hiram Keller, the latter of whom had appeared in the original Broadway production of Hair and in Fellini's Satyrikon. The film is based on Breillat's 1974 novel Le Soupirail (The Air Vent), about the sexual stirrings of a 14-year-old girl that lead to a dramatic denouement. The production company Les Films de la Boétie, owned by director and producer André Genovès, went bankrupt before the film was released and its film stock was eventually sold to the French distributor Artédis. In 1999, after almost twenty years of Une vraie jeune fille never having been shown anywhere, Breillat took legal action to obtain the rights to the film, claiming that Pierre-Richard Muller, owner of Artédis, had made clumsy copies of it which had been surreptitiously sold as porn.

In 1979, she wrote and directed the film Tapage nocturne (Nocturnal Uproar), featuring Dominique Laffin, about a film director who is a single mother with a daughter and engages in brief, erotic liaisons. In 1988, she wrote and directed 36 Fillette (Junior Size 36), with then 16-year-old Delphine Zentout as a sexually curious and rebellious 14-year-old engaged in a reciprocally manipulative relationship with an aging philanderer. Then, in 1991, she made Sale comme un ange (Dirty Like An Angel) with Claude Brasseur and Lio, which follows a crooked and alcoholic cop who has an affair with his best friend's wife. In 1996, she made the film Parfait Amour! (Perfect Love!) with Francis Renaud and Isabelle Renauld, about the affair between a divorced mother of two and a free-spirited young man.

She also continued to work as a screenwriter during this time for films such as David Hamilton's Bilitis (1977), Maurice Pialat's Police starring Gérard Depardieu, Sophie Marceau, and Sandrine Bonnaire (1985), and the thriller Milan Noir starring Isabelle Huppert (1993).

In 1999, she made the film Romance, with the camera helmed by Yorgos Arvanitis, Theo Angelopoulos' favorite director of photography, which became a succès de scandale as it depicts unsimulated sex between protagonists Rocco Siffredi, a porn actor, and actress Caroline Ducey. The plot revolves around a schoolteacher engaged in a long but sexually disappointing relationship who has a one night stand with a stranger and begins a sado-masochistic affair with her school's headmaster.

In 2024, some twenty-five years after the production of Romance, Ducey recounted in her autobiographical book La Prédation (nom féminin) (The Predation [feminine noun]), as well as in an interview with Nouvel Obs, the "traumatizing" sexual assault she endured during the filming, most notably during scenes of unsimulated cunnilingus and anal sex for which she holds Breillat responsible, as she had not given consent. According to Ducey, Breillat demanded that co-star François Berléand penetrate her digitally on camera but he refused, though actor Reza Habouhossein did perform oral sex on her at Breillat's command.

Breillat, responding to the accusation, stated that, while the scenes of unsimulated sex were not in Ducey's contract, the actress had agreed to film them, since everyone who had read the script, including Ducey, should have known what the film's content would be. She said Ducey was "delusional" and announced her intention to file a lawsuit against the actress for defamation, though she did not follow through on this. Ducey "categorically" denied all of Breillat's claims and appealed to the "conscience of the world of cinema" to address the issue of sexual aggression in film sets, a phenomenon she believed had become "banalized." (Note: In 2022, Breillat declared that "actors are prostitutes," and qualified the claim by adding that this is because actors are paid to play other people's feelings. Breillat characterized the actors' prostitution as an act "not profane" but "a sacred act that we [filmmakers] give them [the opportunity to engage in]." See Kohn (2022).)

In 2004, Breillat directed Anatomie de l'enfer (Anatomy of Hell), featuring Amira Casar and Siffredi, which she said was a "sequel to Romance", and in which, once again, there are scenes of unsimulated sex. The story, based on her book Pornocratie (Pornocracy), revolves around an affair between a suicidal woman and a gay stranger. Breillat subsequently related the difficulties of shooting this film and praised Siffredi for his screen presence and acting abilities.

In 2004, Breillat suffered a intracerebral hemorrhage, causing a stroke that paralyzed her left side. After a long hospitalization and a process of gradual rehabilitation, she returned to work in 2007, producing, writing, and directing Une vieille maîtresse (The Old Mistress), one of three French films officially selected for the Cannes Film Festival that year.

During the 2000s, Breillat developed a fascination for Christophe Rocancourt, a con man who had then gained media fame due to his imprisonment in the United States and the publication of his autobiography. She met and befriended Rocancourt, offering him the male lead role in a film she was planning to make based on her novel Bad Love. She planned to cast Naomi Campbell in the female lead role. In an interview, she praised Rocancourt's "striking presence". She gave him €25,000 to write a screenplay titled La vie amoureuse de Christophe Rocancourt (The Life of Love of Christophe Rocancourt), and over the next year and a half, gave him "loans" totaling an additional €678,000. In 2009, Breillat published a book, titled Abus de faiblesse—a French legal term literally translated as "abuse of weakness" and meaning "exploitation of a vulnerable person"—in which she alleged that Rocancourt had taken advantage of her diminished mental capacity while she was recovering from her stroke. In 2012, Rocancourt was convicted of exploiting Breillat's vulnerability to appropriate her funds and was sentenced to eight months' imprisonment.

Ιn 2007, Breillat completed the filming of the French-Italian production Une vieille maîtresse (distributed in English-speaking countries as The Last Mistress), which she wrote and directed, starring Asia Argento and Fu'ad Aït Aattou. The story is based on the eponymous 19th century novel by Jules Barbey d'Aurevilly about a wayward dandy who falls in love with a young woman but is unable to fully leave his mistress.

In September 2010, Breillat's The Sleeping Beauty, opened in the Orizzonti sidebar in the 67th Venice Film Festival. The story begins on the premise of the well-known, eponymous fairy tale. Some years later, in a 2018 interview, Breillat stated that she did not accept Argento's accusations against Harvey Weinstein for sexual abuse, calling Argento a "servile" and "promiscuous" woman who engaged in "semi-prostitution". Argento responded by calling Breillat "the most sadistic and downright evil director [she had] ever worked with". In the same interview, Breillat stated that she didn't approve of the #MeToo movement in which Argento participated, adding that the Miramax owner's downfall was a "loss" for the European film industry.

In 2012, Breillat directed an adaptation of her book Abus de faiblesse, starring Isabelle Huppert, which was screened at the 2013 Toronto International Film Festival. She then took a ten-year hiatus, during which she started teaching cinema at the Switzerland-based European Graduate School in 2014, and was appointed that same year, to the Ordre des Arts et des Lettres. In 2023 Breillat returned to directing with L'Été Dernier (Last Summer), featuring Léa Drucker and then 18-year-old Samuel Kircher. The story was based on the 2019 Danish film Queen of Hearts and was co-written with Pascal Bonitzer. Kircher was nominated for Lumière's Most Promising Actor award, playing a young boy who begins an incestuous and eventually destructive erotic relationship with the wife of his father.

== Breillat's cinema ==
Breillat is known for films focusing on sexuality, intimacy, gender conflict, and sibling rivalry. Her work has been associated with the cinéma du corps (cinema of the body) genre, a term she detests on the grounds that it oversimplifies her work, often mislabeled as merely pornographic or solely focused on the physical. She submits that, while her work is considered controversial for explicitly exploring the human body, these explorations offer a deeper and complex, underlying purpose.

Breillat herself has said she attempts to redefine the female narrative in cinema by showing female characters undergoing experiences similar to their male counterparts. She tries to explore the transition between girlhood and adulthood, as the women of her films, she said, attempt to escape their adolescence by seeking individuality. Liz Constable posits that there is a silence imposed by society on girls to hide their sexuality and desires, except when directly confronted about them, and Breillat offers a platform to expose and discuss female pleasure and sexual responsibility through presenting social and sexual conflicts.

It has been noted that "Breillat remains committed to the long take, particularly during scenes of sexual negotiation, a technique that intends to employ her performers' acting technique to emphasize the political and philosophical elements of sex. In films such as Fat Girl and Romance, key sex scenes possess shots lasting over seven minutes."

In an interview to Senses of Cinema, she described David Cronenberg as a filmmaker who she considers to have a similar approach to sexuality in his film work.

== Personal life ==
In a 2007 interview to Elle, Breillat mentioned that she has three children, a daughter, Salomé, then aged 35, and two sons, Hadrien and Paul, aged 25 and 15 respectively, adding that she has shown them all her films. (Note: Breillat has said, "I never wanted to be a mother, but to invent the world that belonged to me: to create cinema, to write. Under no circumstances did I want to be a mother. ... I love my children, but that’s not my identity at all." See Joudet (2025))

== Works ==
=== Filmography ===
Year	English title	Original title	Notes
1975	Catherine & Co.	Catherine et Compagnie	Writer only
1976	A Real Young Girl	Une vraie jeune fille	Based on Breillat's novel Le Soupirail. Withdrawn after initial showing; re-released in 2000
1977	Bilitis		Writer only
1979	Nocturnal Uproar	Tapage nocturne	
1985		Police	Writer only
1987		Milan noir	Writer only
1988	Virgin / Junior Size 36	36 fillette	Based on her novel
1991	Dirty Like an Angel	Sale comme un ange	
1993	Couples et amants	Couples et amants	Co-writer
1996	Perfect Love	Parfait amour!	
1999	Romance	Romance X	
2001	Fat Girl	À ma sœur!	
2001	Brief Crossing	Brève traversée	
2002	Sex Is Comedy	Sex Is Comedy	
2004	Anatomy of Hell	Anatomie de l'enfer	Based on her novel Pornocratie
2007	The Last Mistress	Une vieille maîtresse	Based on the novel by Jules Amédée Barbey d'Aurevilly (1851). Entered into the 2007 Cannes Film Festival.
2009	Bluebeard	Barbe bleue	Based on the tale by Charles Perrault
2010	The Sleeping Beauty	La belle endormie	Based on Sleeping Beauty by Charles Perrault
2013	Abuse of Weakness	Abus de faiblesse	Based on her book of the same title
2013	30/30 Vision: 3 Decades of Strand Releasing		anthology film segment
2023	Last Summer	L'Été dernier	Based on the 2019 Danish film Queen of Hearts

=== Bibliography ===
- L'homme facile [A Man for the Asking] (in French). Christian Bourgois. 1968.
- Les Vêtements de mer [The Clothes for the Sea] (in French). François Wimille Éditeur. 1971.
- Le Soupirail [The Air Vent] (in French). Guy Autier Éditeur. 1974.
- Tapage Nocturne [Nocturnal Uproar] (in French). Mercure de France. 1979. ISBN 9782715211841.
- Police (in French). Albin Michel. 1985. ISBN 2226024603.
- Abus de faiblesse et autres manipulations [Abuse of Weakness and other manipulations] (in French). JC Lattès. 2012. ISBN 9782709636711.
- Pornocratie [Pornocracy] (in French). Éditions Denoël. 2004. ISBN 9782207252017.

== See also ==
- Virginie Despentes
