= Lotfi Dziri =

Tunisian actor (1946–2013)

- لطفي الدزيري
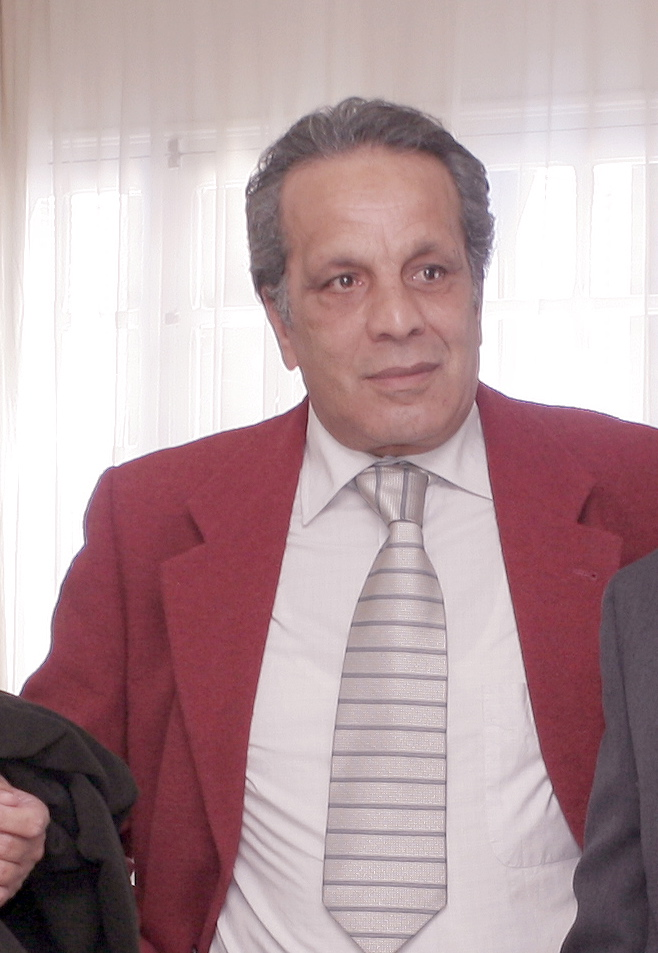
- Born: January 6, 1946; Carthage, Tunisia
- Died: May 5, 2013 (aged 67); Tunis
- Occupation: Actor
- Notable work: City of Shadows

Lotfi Dziri (Arabic: لطفي الدزيري; January 6, 1946 in Carthage – May 5, 2013) was a Tunisian actor.

== Filmography ==
=== Cinema ===
- 1997: Keswa, le fil perdu (Kiswa, the lost thread) by Kalthoum Bornaz
- 2001: Le Désert et la forêt (The Desert and the forest) as Gebhr
- 2004: Parole d'hommes (The word of Man) by Moez Kamoun and Hassan Ben Othman
- 2004: Gladiators by Tilman Remme, Georgann Kane, Steve Manuel and Chris Ould as the trainer
- 2004: Deadlines by Michael Alan Lerner and Ludi Boeken as Rahman
- 2004: Visa by Ibrahim Letaief
- 2005: The Villa by Mohamed Damak, Madih Belaid and Mohamed Mahfoudh
- 2006: Bin El Widyene (Between Valleys) by Khaled Barsaoui
- 2006: Making of by Nouri Bouzid
- 2007: Le Sacre de l'homme (The coronation of men) by Jacques Malaterre with Helmi Dridi, Rabeb Srairi, Yves Coppens and Michel Fessler as Uhru
- 2009: The String (Le Fil) by Mehdi Ben Attia and Olivier Laneurie as Abdelaziz
- 2010: The Last Mirage by Nidhal Chatta
- 2010: City of Shadows (La Cité) by Kim Nguyen as Georges
- 2011: Or noir (Black Gold) by Jean-Jacques Annaud and Hans Ruesch as Cheikh de Bani Sirri
- 2012: Fausse note (False Note) by Majdi Smiri as Mr Lamine
- 2014: El Ziara, la lune noire (The Ziara, the black moon) by Nawfel Saheb Ettabaa

=== Television ===
- 2001: Dhafayer (Braids) by Habib Mselmani, Madih Belaid, Abdelhakim Alimi and Ridha Gaham
- 2002: Gamret Sidi Mahrous (The moon of Master Mahrus) by Slaheddine Essid and Ali Louati as Dr Abdallah Souilah
- 2003: Douroub El Mouajaha (Paths of confrontation) by Abdelkader Jerbi and Abdelkader Belhaj Nasser as Mansour
- 2004: Loutil (The Hostel) by Slaheddine Essid and Hatem Belhaj as Abed
- 2005: Café Jalloul by Mohamed Damak, Imed Ben Hamida and Lotfi Ben Sassi as Jilani alias Johnny
- 2005: Le Voyage de Louisa (Louisa's journey) by Patrick Volson and Azouz Begag as El Fransaoui
- 2005–2006: Choufli Hal (Find me a solution) by Slaheddine Essid, Abdelkader Jerbi and Hatem Belhaj as Professor Ben Amor
- 2006: Nwasi w A’teb by Abdelkader Jerbi and Allala Nwairia
- 2010: Dar Lekhlaa by Ahmed Rajab and Hatem Belhaj as Baha
