= Innocent Blood (film) =

1992 film by John Landis

- Theatrical release poster by John Alvin
- Directed by: John Landis
- Written by: Michael Wolk
- Produced by: Leslie Belzberg; Lee Rich
- Starring: Anne Parillaud; Robert Loggia; Anthony LaPaglia; Don Rickles
- Cinematography: Mac Ahlberg
- Edited by: Dale Beldin
- Music by: Ira Newborn
- Distributed by: Warner Bros.
- Release date: September 25, 1992
- Running time: 112 minutes
- Country: United States
- Language: English
- Budget: $20 million
- Box office: $4.9 million

Innocent Blood (also known in some regions as A French Vampire in America) is a 1992 American erotic comedy horror thriller film directed by John Landis and written by Michael Wolk. The film stars Anne Parillaud as Marie, a beautiful French vampire who finds herself pitted against a gang of mobsters led by Salvatore Macelli (Robert Loggia), who eventually becomes a vampire and schemes to build a criminal syndicate of vampires.

The film is set in and was filmed in Pittsburgh, Pennsylvania. Actors Tony Sirico, Tony Lip and David Proval have supporting parts as gangsters, foreshadowing their roles in The Sopranos. It also features early appearances by Anthony LaPaglia, Angela Bassett and Chazz Palminteri. The film is notable for being a mixture of the vampire, gangster and buddy cop genres. The film was a box-office bomb, earning only $5 million against its $20 million budget.

== Plot ==
Marie is a vampire in contemporary Pittsburgh, with a moral code that limits her bloodsucking to the criminal elements of society. After feasting on mafioso Tony Silva, she shoots him in the head with a shotgun to cover up the bite marks on his neck and prevent his return as a vampire. Undercover cop Joseph Gennaro's visit to the crime scene appears in the media, and his assignment of infiltrating the crime family of Salvatore "Sal the Shark" Macelli ends when he's put into protective custody by District Attorney Barbara Sinclair.

Marie seduces Sal at his mansion for "dinner" but is warded off when Sal serves garlic mussels. Sal attempts to rape her but Marie overpowers him and drains his blood, but before she can finish him off, Sal's limousine driver, Lenny, forces her to flee. Gennaro investigates the scene and follows a trail of blood to a nearby church, where he encounters Marie. She demands he drive her to Sal's corpse at the morgue. Sal awakens as a vampire and police and reporters witness him drive off in a stolen car to the home of his attorney, Manny Bergman.

Marie is taken into custody by Detectives Dave Finton and Steve Morales but escapes and follows Gennaro, who pursues Sal to Bergman's house. Sal drinks Bergman's blood, and Gennaro is captured by Lenny and Jacko. The three mobsters take Gennaro to the docks to kill him, but Marie rescues him, killing Sal's men in the process. Gennaro and Marie break off their pursuit of Sal when the sun rises. Bergman, now a vampire, is transferred to a hospital where he burns alive when a nurse lets sunlight into his room. Gennaro and Marie confess their feelings for each other in a motel and have sex.

Sal travels to a strip club and begins turning his men into vampires. Gennaro and Marie begin searching Mafia hangouts for Sal. Finton and Morales track him down to the strip club but Sal's men kill Finton. Marie and Gennaro arrive in time to save Morales and kill Sal's men by shooting them in the head. They chase Sal out onto the street, where he causes a collision between a taxi and a bus. Gennaro kills him by igniting him with leaking gasoline and shooting him in the head. Marie attempts to commit suicide by the sunlight, stating that she "died a long time ago". Gennaro tells her he loves her and books her into a nearby hotel. Marie states in a voiceover that he "made [her] feel alive" and decides to make him a vampire.

== Cast ==
- Anne Parillaud as Marie
- Robert Loggia as Salvatore "Sal The Shark" Macelli
- Anthony LaPaglia as Detective Joseph Gennaro
- Don Rickles as Manny Bergman
- Elaine Kagan as Frannie Bergman
- David Proval as Lenny
- Rocco Sisto as Gilly
- Chazz Palminteri as Tony Silva
- Kim Coates as Ray
- Marshall Bell as Detective Marsh
- Linnea Quigley as Nurse Nancy Smith
- Tony Sirico as Jacko
- Tony Lip as Frank
- Luis Guzmán as Detective Steve Morales
- Angela Bassett as U.S. Attorney Barbara Sinclair
- Leo Burmester as Detective Dave Finton
- Rohn Thomas as Coroner
- Frank Oz as Pathologist
- Tom Savini as News Photographer
- Sam Raimi as Roma Meats Man
- Forrest J. Ackerman as Stolen Car Man
- Dario Argento as Paramedic
- Yancey Arias as Coroner's Assistant
- Ron Roth as Gus
- Vic Noto as Tommy
- Jerry Lyden as Vinnie

== Production ==
John Landis had a deal with Warner Bros. Pictures to direct a film based on a script by Mick Garris and Richard Christian Matheson called Red Sleep. Landis re-wrote the script with Harry Shearer, saying "it was pretty wild. The premise was basically that Las Vegas is a city that is run by vampires." The studio did not like the idea, and instead offered him another vampire script, Innocent Blood by Michael Wolk. Landis said "I really liked it. I was given tremendous freedom by the studio to make it, although it was rather low budget. It was very risky, which I think perhaps contributed to the fact that it didn’t do well."

Landis cast Anne Parillaud off the back of La Femme Nikita "because Marie had to be beautiful and sexy and very sympathetic. Anne had been a ballerina, so she had this amazing physicality." Landis said preview audiences had trouble understanding her French accent but he refused to dub her. Landis said he described the film as "a Hammer film as if it was directed by Scorsese".

The film was shot in Pittsburgh, beginning on January 13, 1992; Landis originally intended to film in Philadelphia and set it in New York but decided on Pittsburgh upon visiting there. The "Little Italy" of Pittsburgh, a portion of the Bloomfield neighborhood, clustered around Liberty Avenue, can be seen in many of the film's outdoor urban scenes. Filming wrapped in April 1992. In post-production, Landis made about 15 to 20 minutes of cuts to the film. The MPAA wanted to give the film an NC-17 rating, so Landis cut out two minutes of sexual and violent content to secure an R.

== Release ==
=== Box office ===
Innocent Blood opened on September 25, 1992, and grossed $1,857,658 in its opening weekend, earning the #7 spot at the box office. By the end of its run, the film had grossed $4,943,279 domestically.

=== Home media ===
Several versions were released for home viewing, which were generally cut to some extent, censored for nudity and gore. The US (region 1) DVD release is the shortest, and is also in pan and scan 4:3 ratio, whereas the original film was widescreen. The most complete DVD version is the German release, entitled Bloody Marie: Eine Frau Mit Biss which is 28 seconds longer and in widescreen format. The widescreen version was eventually released on Blu-ray by the Warner Archive Collection on September 19, 2017. In May 2020, HMV released it on Blu-ray on their Premium Collection label in the UK with four art cards and a fold-out poster.

== Critical reception ==
The film received mixed reviews from critics. On Rotten Tomatoes, it holds a 36% score based on 25 reviews, with an average rating of 4.9/10. The site's consensus reads, "Awkward tonal shifts and a sluggish pace plague Innocent Blood -- a horror comedy with anemic scares and laughs".

Roger Ebert gave the film 2 out of 4 stars and said the film misses opportunities to fully explore the notion of vampire-gangsters and is muddled in its execution. Ebert said "It looks great, with its film noir streets and its vampires who steam and disintegrate at the touch of sunlight (Don Rickles, as Loggia's lawyer, meets a particularly gruesome end)…But such cuteness doesn't make up for the lack of a clear idea of what the movie is about", and "it's all effect and no emotion." He noted Parillaud's Marie "is an interesting character, and some of her scenes with LaPaglia have a certain poignance as a result. But she's real enough, dimensional enough, to be more at home in one of Anne Rice's vampire stories, instead of in this uneasy anthology of genres and styles."

In a positive review for the Los Angeles Times, Kevin Thomas wrote Landis and Wolk "take real risks in that Innocent Blood must always be as funny as they are grisly or they quickly become a turnoff. Fortunately, they’re able to turn the lavish display of blood and guts, devilishly concocted by special makeup effects maestro Steve Johnson, into cathartic laughter". He also said Robert Loggia is given "a legitimate opportunity to tear loose and grandstand gloriously, infusing the entire film with an exhilarating comic energy."

Kathleen Maher of The Austin Chronicle criticized the film's length and said, "It loses steam and coherence about midway through, leaving us rooting for it but doomed to disappointment. Combining comedy, horror, romance and chase scenes, Innocent Blood finally begins to collapse in on itself but not before we've had more than a few good laughs and a frightened yelp or two."

== See also ==
- Vampire film
