= Boeken =

Boeken is a surname. Notable people with the surname include:

- Ludi Boeken (born 1951), Dutch film producer, director, and actor
- Noah Boeken (born 1981), Dutch poker player and Magic: The Gathering player
