= Alexandra Wejchert =

Polish-Irish sculptor

- Born: 16 October 1921; Kraków, Poland
- Died: 24 October 1995 (aged 74); Tivoli Road, Dún Laoghaire, Ireland
- Known for: Sculpture and Relief
- Style: Abstract Art

Alexandra Wejchert (16 October 1921 – 24 October 1995) was a Polish-Irish sculptor, known for her use of perspex (plexiglass), stainless steel, bronze and neon colours.

== Early life ==
Alexandra Wejchert was born in Kraków, Poland on 16 October 1921. She was the oldest of five children to Tadeusz and Irena Wejchert (née Mojgis). (Note: The Rodzina Wejchertow - Kronika is a limited publication that features the lives and history of the Wejchert family, including a documented genealogical tree dating back to 1791. It includes a summary of the lives of Tadeusz and Irena and their five children, of which Alexandra was the oldest.) Tadeusz ran a shipping business in Gdansk where the family lived until 1939. The family left just before the Nazi invasion of the Free City of Gdansk on 1 September 1939, to move in with Tadeusz's brother, Kazimierz, who was then living in Warsaw.

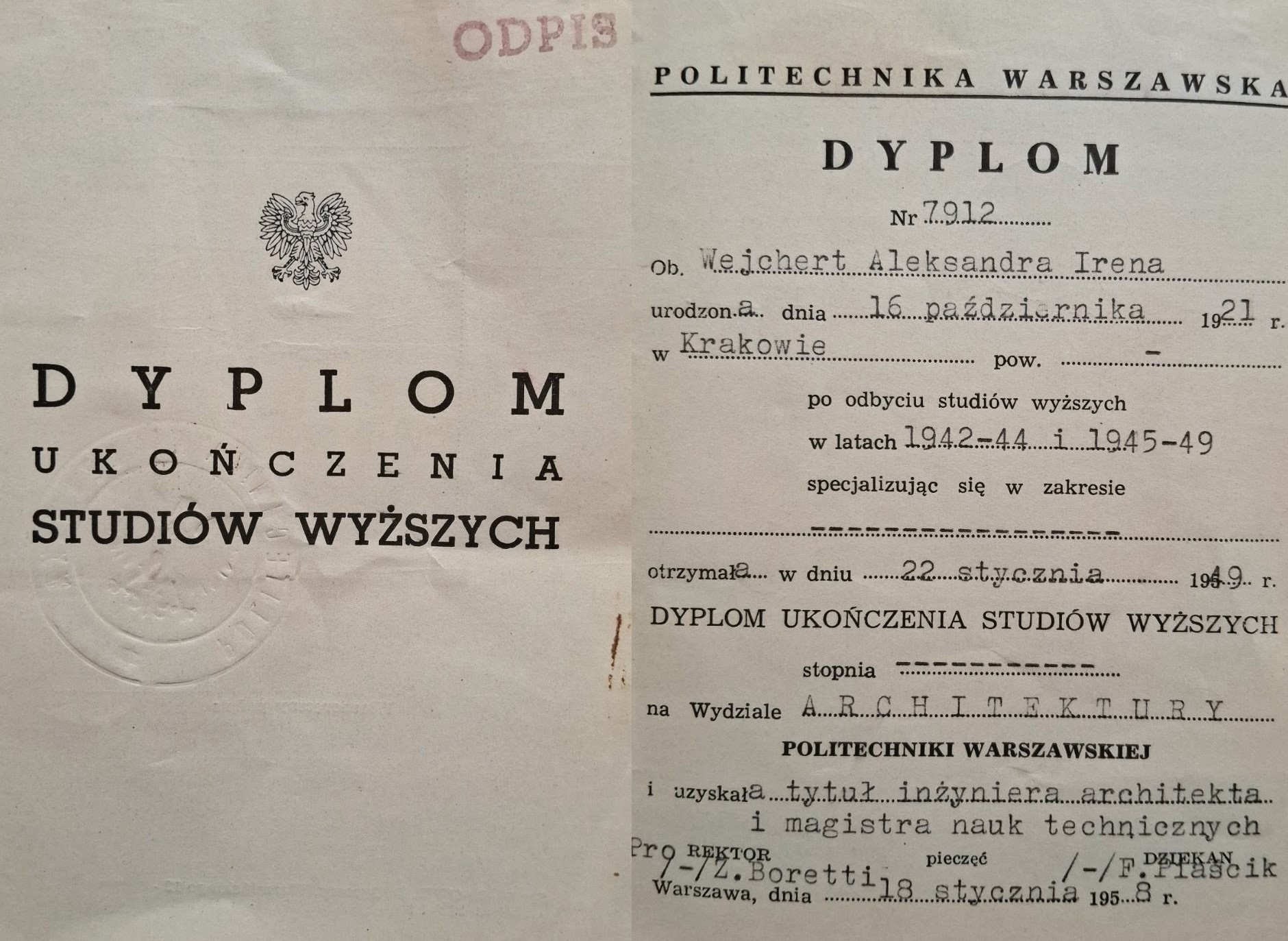
Alexandra Wejchert Architecture Degree 1949

Alexandra Wejchert later entered the University of Warsaw to study architecture, and while there witnessed the German occupation of Poland during World War II. Memories of the war, and later, of the oppression of the communist regime, remained with her for the rest of her life. The wartime period significantly disrupted her studies, but she finally graduated in 1949, subsequently to work as a town planner and architect in Warsaw. Still not having found her true path in life, she went on to study art, and graduated from the Academy of Fine Arts in Warsaw in 1956.

From the mid-1950s up to 1965, Alexandra Wejchert lived with her partner Janusz Dmowski an architect, in central Warsaw. They resided in a loft apartment in ulica Warecka, that backs onto the historical and now fashionable street Nowy Świat.

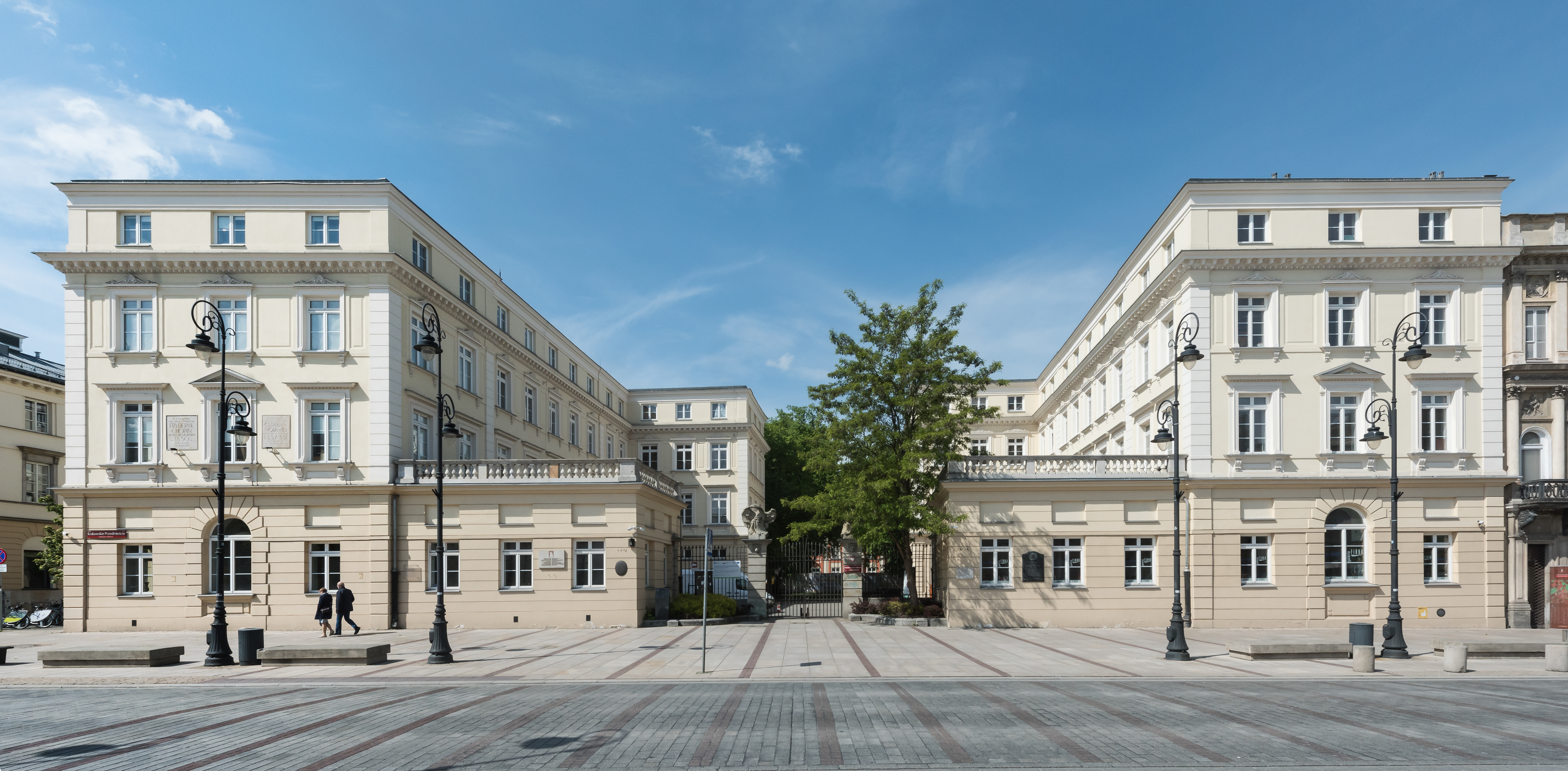
Alexandra Wejchert studied at the Academy of Fine Arts in Warsaw

In 1964 her younger brother Andrzej Wejchert commenced architectural practice in Ireland, on the strength of winning the International Architectural Competition for the new University College Dublin campus. Andrzej went on to become a respected architect in Ireland and the architectural practice he established with his wife Danuta continues today. Her nephew Jan Wejchert later became an important businessman in Poland, spearheading the ITI and TVN media and television networks in Poland – which became symbols of free media amid the fall of the communist regime and subsequent economic liberalisation.

In the late 1950s Alexandra Wejchert travelled to Italy, where she sketched and painted, and held one of her first exhibitions. In 1961 she gave birth to her son Jakub. Increasingly, she could not bear living under the communist regime and in 1965 she left Poland with her son to move to Paris, and then later to Ireland.

== Career ==
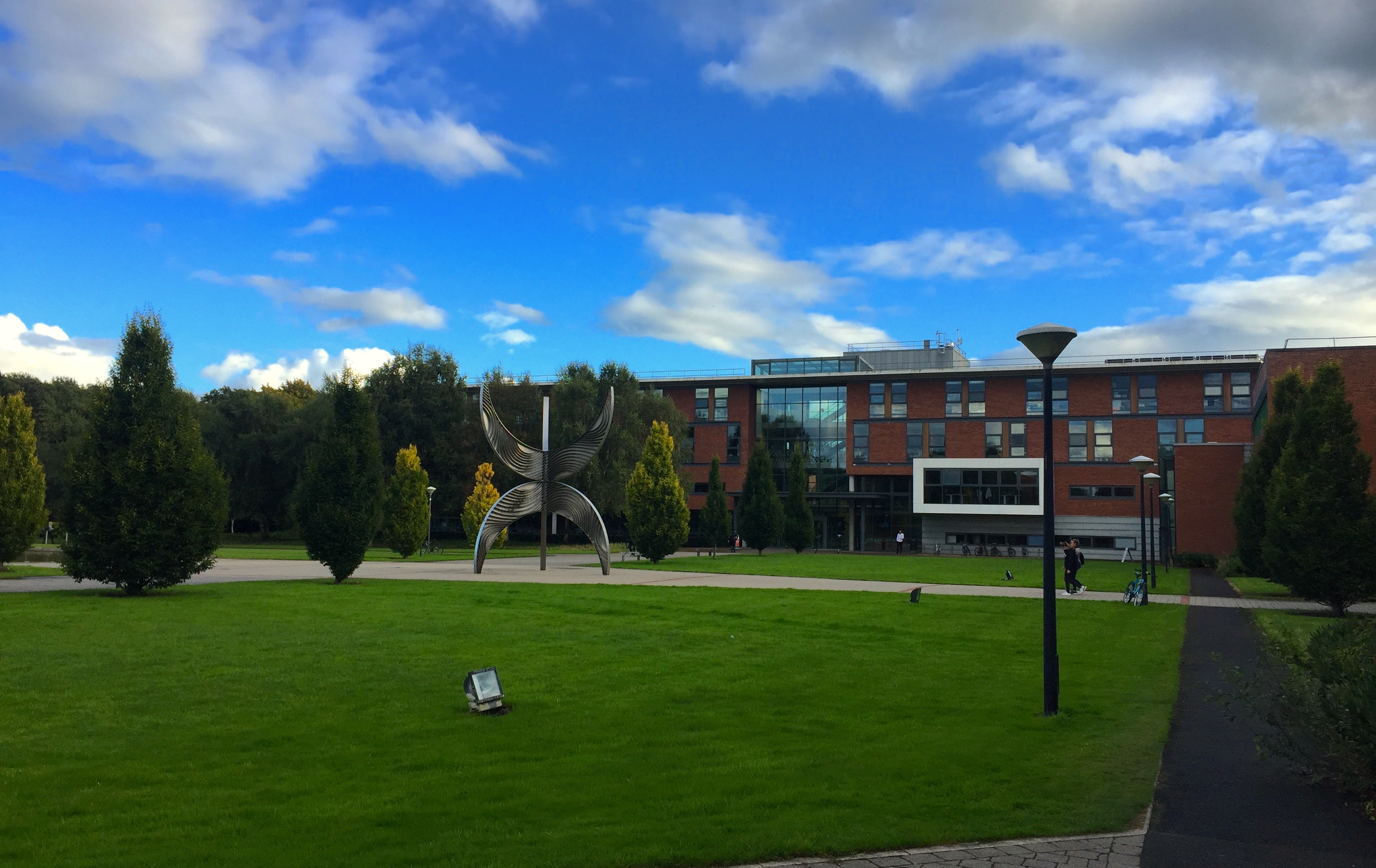
Wejchert's Geometric form at the University of Limerick

Wejchert held her first solo show in 1959 in the Galeria dell’ Obelisco, Rome. She then returned to Warsaw where she was featured in the National Museum "Fifteen years of Polish art" exhibition in 1961. At this time she was still working as an architect but did not support the social realism of Soviet architecture, which led her to decide to concentrate solely on abstract art from 1963.

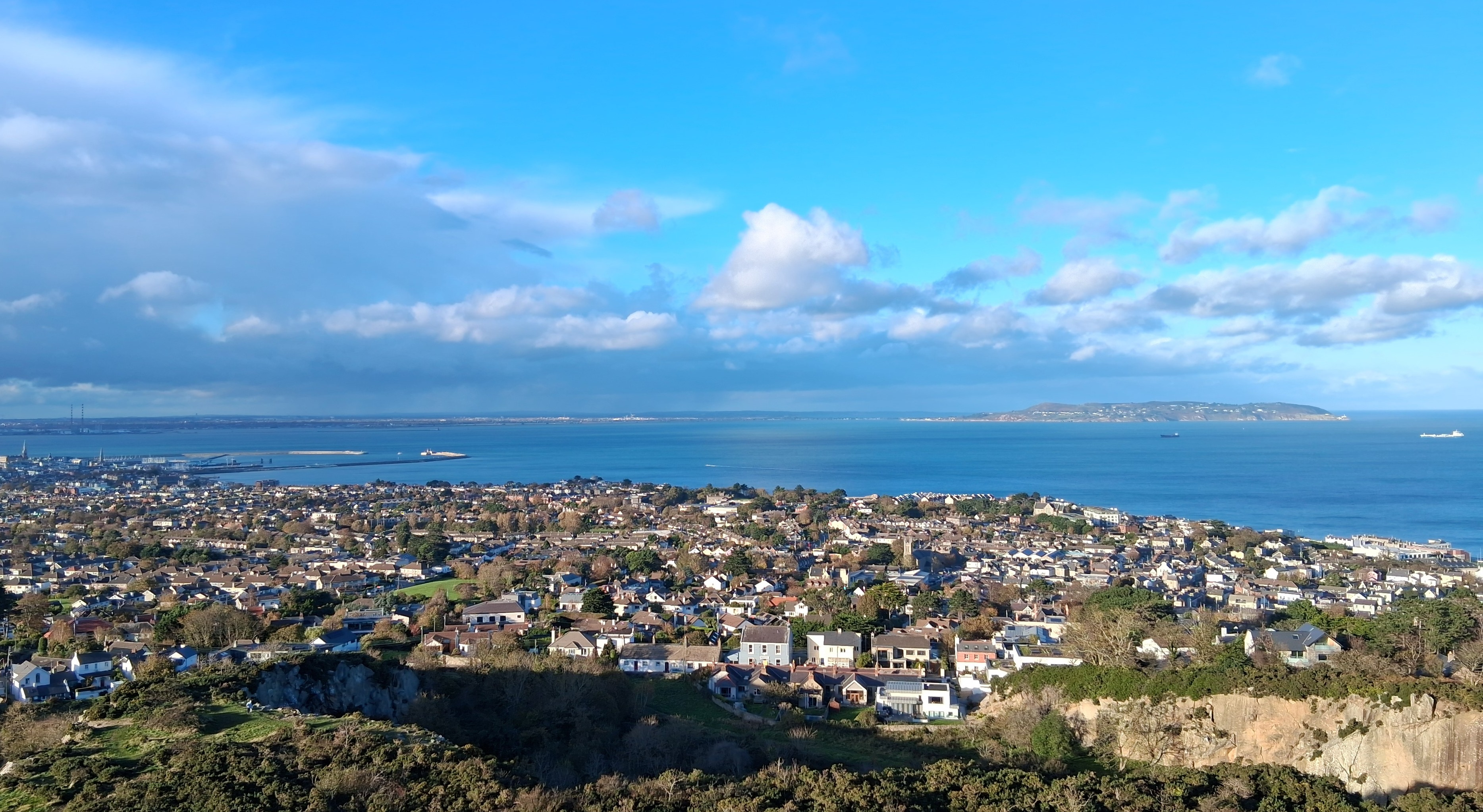
Alexandra Wejchert lived in Dalkey and Dún Laoghaire, in South County Dublin.

She left communist Poland in 1965, and later accompanied her younger brother, the architect Andrzej Wejchert, and his wife Danuta who had moved to Dublin, Ireland, the year previously.

She held her first solo exhibition in Dublin in November 1966 with an exhibition of 30 paintings at The Molesworth Gallery. In 1967 she showed Blue relief at the Irish Exhibition of Living Art, which was a wall relief of "sculpted paintings" which were precursors to her later free-standing sculpture. Wejchert won the Carroll Open award of £300 at the 1968 Irish Exhibition of Living Art for Frequency No. 5. Also in 1968, she held a solo exhibition in the Galerie Lambert, Paris, becoming a regular exhibitor there. In 1969 she held a large solo exhibition of 30 reliefs at the David Hendriks Gallery in Dublin.

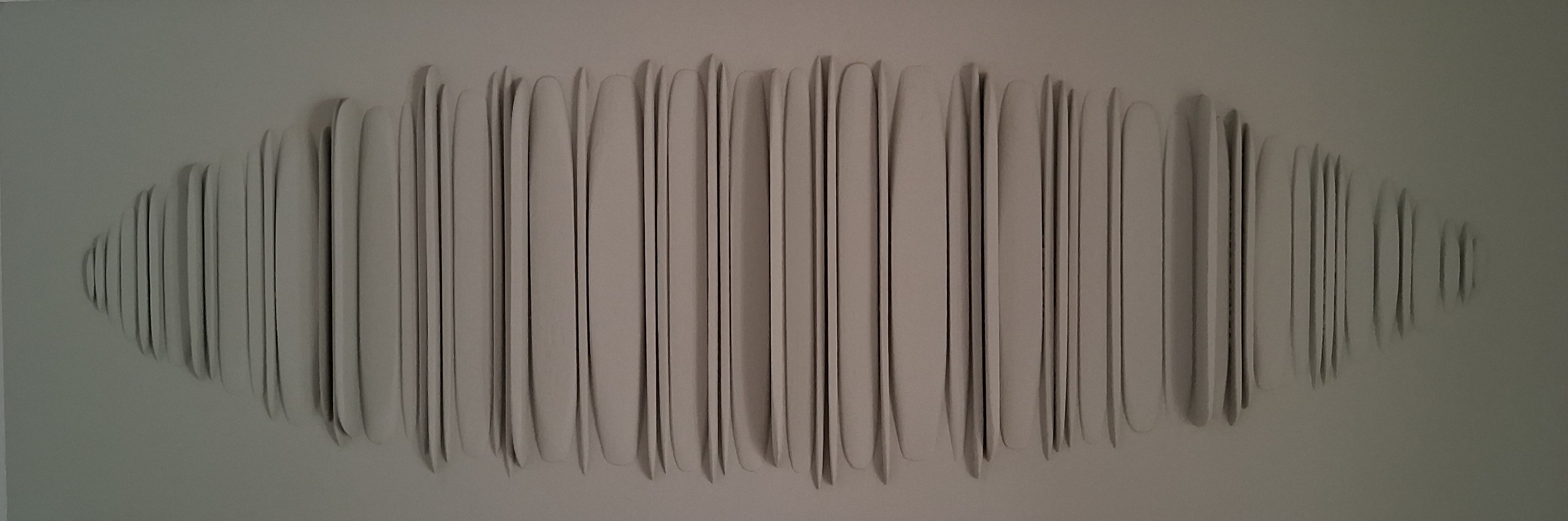
Painted Relief 1966

During this period her work was used as a setting for an electronic music concert with the critic Dorothy Walker noting her designs had a rhythmic quality. From the 1970s, Wejchert won commissions for public art, starting with the 1971 wood and acrylic wall relief in the arts building at University College Dublin.

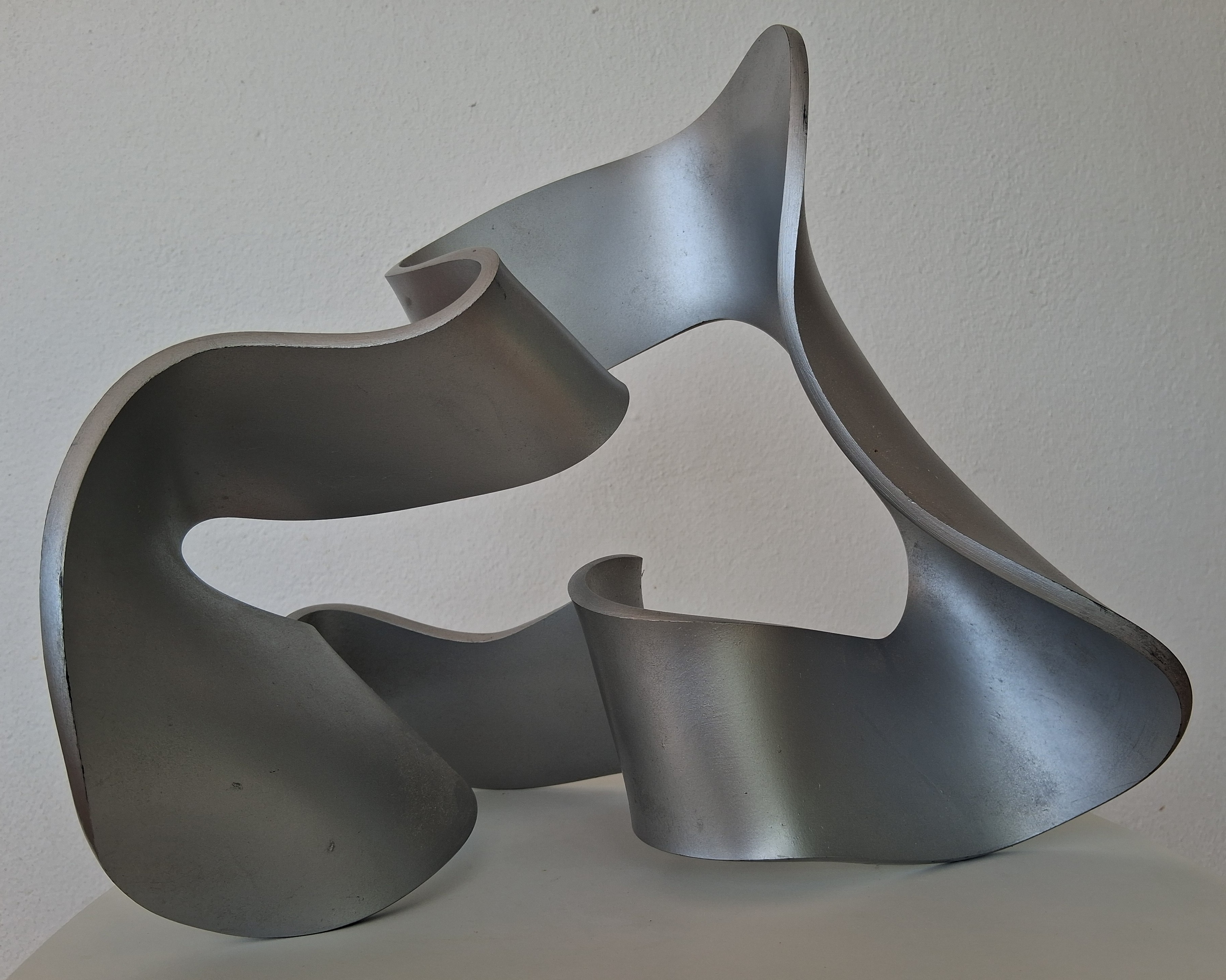
Perspex Sculpture

In the same year, 1971, the Bank of Ireland purchased Blue form 1971 and then Flowing relief in 1972. Her 1971 triptych, Life, was commissioned for the Irish Life headquarters in Abbey Street. Her entry in a competition in 1975 for a stamp marking International Women's Year, featuring an image of hands reaching for a dove with an olive branch won. The Lombard and Ulster Bank in Dublin commissioned Untitled, a large, a large diamond-shaped stainless steel relief, in 1980.

Philosopher and art critic Cyril Barret wrote:

"Alexandra Wejchert's vision is pure; her approach to art is uncompromising; she searches neither to seduce the eye, nor to follow fashion".

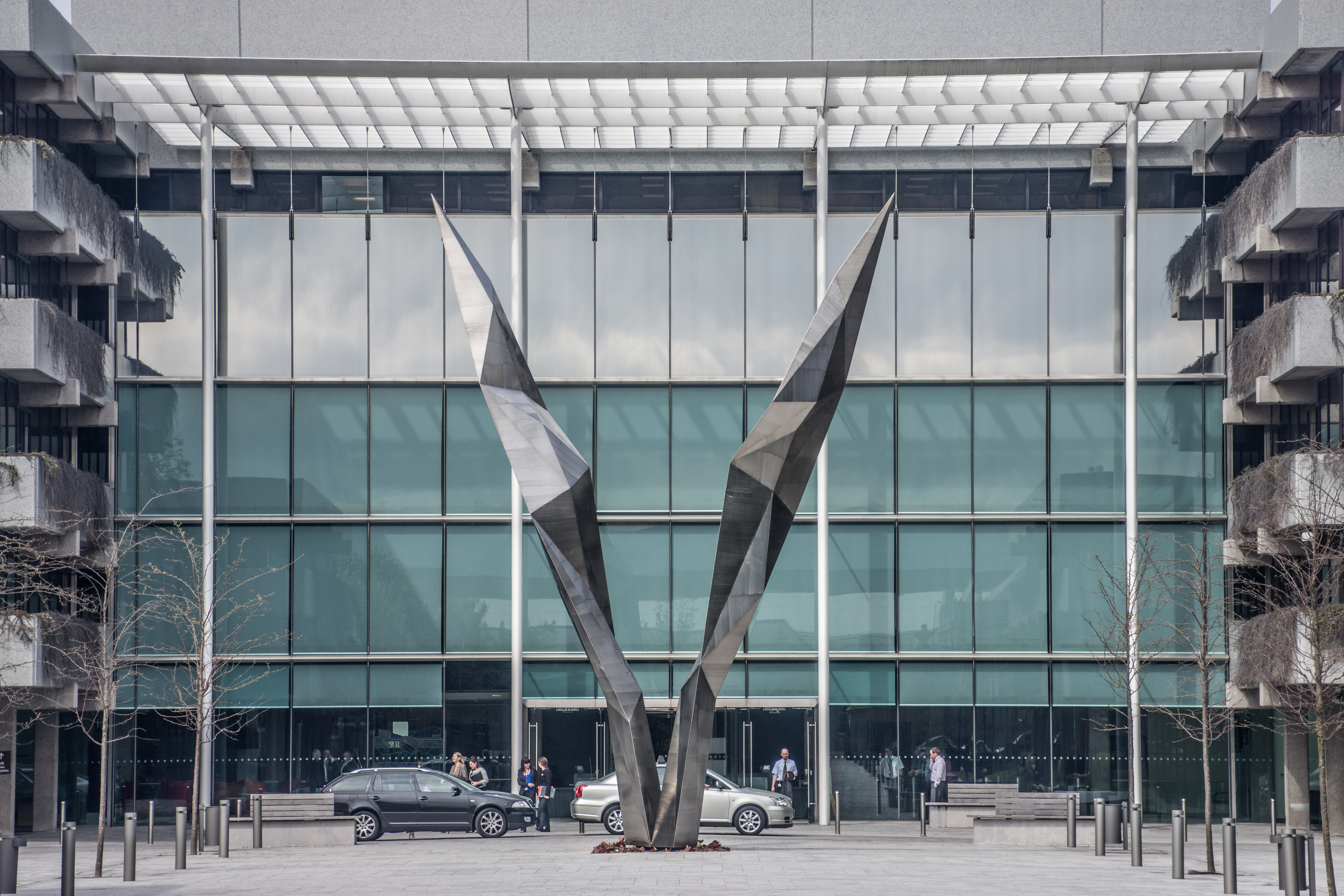
Freedom at the entrance to the AIB Bank in Ballsbridge in 2012

One of her largest sculptures was commissioned by the Allied Irish Bank (AIB). This 11.5 metre high stainless steel sculpture, named Freedom, was erected at the entrance of the AIB headquarters in Ballsbridge, Dublin, in 1985. The National Irish Visual Arts Library (NIVAL) hosts a page dedicated to Alexandra Wejchert with a collection of images of her and her work, as well images of Freedom, and its construction and installation at the time. Following the relocation of the AIB headquarters, the sculpture required a new site. In 2021, under a long-term loan agreement between the AIB and Maynooth University, the Freedom sculpture was moved to the Maynooth University North Campus, as a publicly accessible exterior artwork for the community and the wider region.

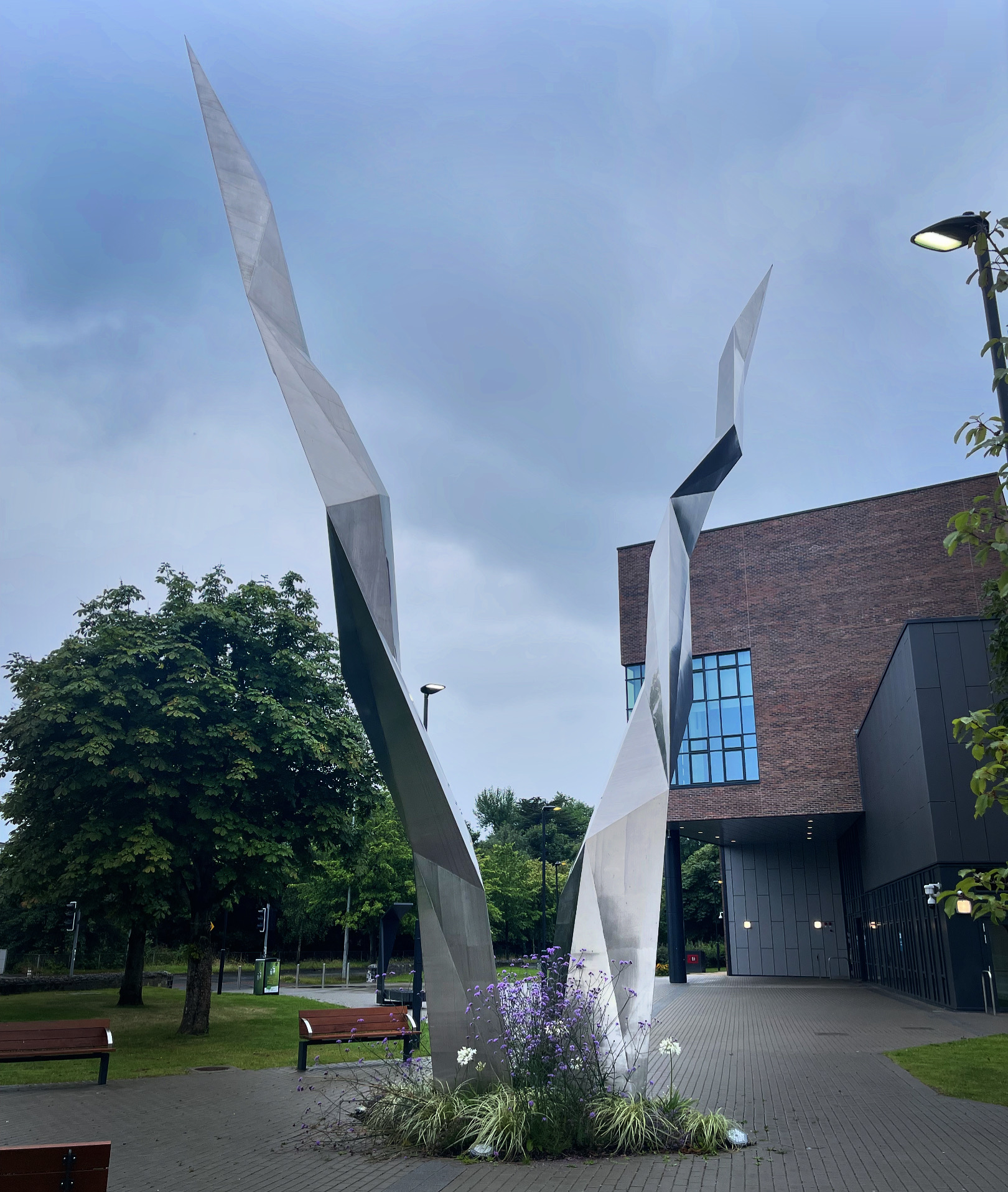
Freedom at its new location at the Maynooth University Campus, 2021

Freedom is considered to be one of Ireland's significant public sculptures. The unveiling of the sculpture at its new location and the scale of the relocation effort for this large sculpture, is captured in a video, Unveiling of Freedom, produced by Maynooth University.

Wejchert became an Irish citizen in 1979, a member of Aosdána in 1981, and a member of the Royal Hibernian Academy (RHA) in 1995. In the late 60s and early 70s, she lived worked at no.14 The Rise (previously known as McCoy Park), Dalkey in South County Dublin. Later in the mid 70s she moved to Eglinton Cottage, Tivoli Road, Dún Laoghaire, where she had an art studio constructed.

She was recognised internationally when she was the only Irish sculptor included in Louis Redstone's new directions (1981). In his book, Contemporary Irish Art: A Documentation, critic Roderick Knowles assessed that:

"She is among the original and powerful sculptors working in Ireland today".

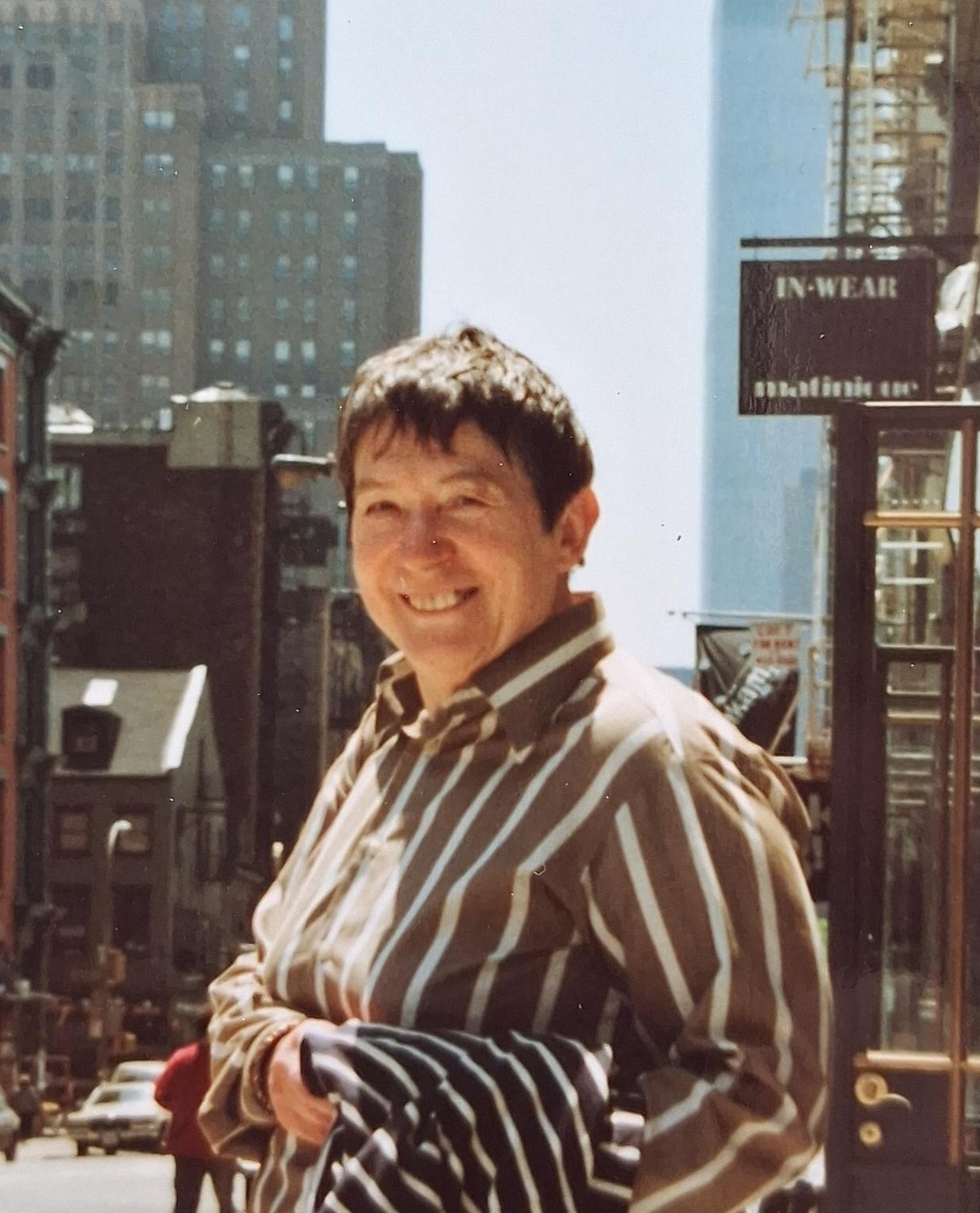
The artist in New York City 1990.

She was shown at the Solomon Gallery from 1989 numerous times, including a solo show in 1992. She participated in the Toyamura International Sculpture Biennale in Japan in 1993, with the sculpture entitled The Cave of Dreams. A number of her most important pieces were for Irish universities, such as Geometric form at the University of Limerick and Flame at the University College Cork, Anatomy Department in 1995, her last work.

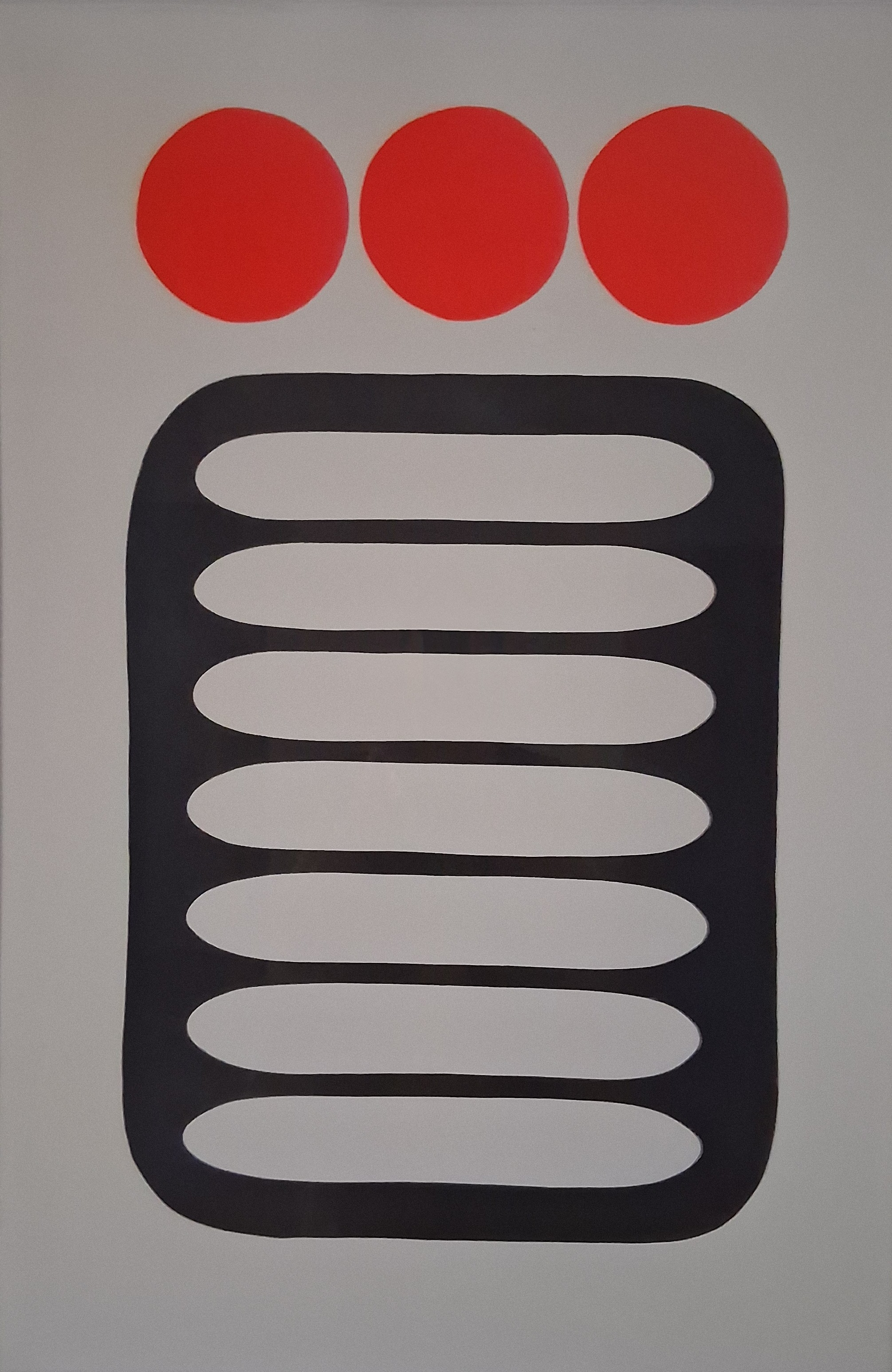
Alexandra Wejchert's The Seven Colours Graphic

She died suddenly at her home, Eglinton Cottage on Tivoli Road, Dún Laoghaire on 24 October 1995. She is survived by her son, Jakub, and his family. (Note: Jakub Wejchert and his family manage the Alexandra Wejchert Estate.)

Several posthumous exhibitions took place to celebrate her work, including: a posthumous exhibition of her work in 1995 at the Royal Hibernian Academy; at Women Sculptors Exhibition in June 1996 at the Solomon Gallery; and at the Boyle Arts Festival in 1996.

She had an active social life at her home Eglinton Cottage, and in later years became good friends with both Imogen Stuart and with Conor Fallon, two well known sculptors in Ireland. She is said to have influenced the younger generation of Irish sculptors, including Vivienne Roche, Eilis O'Connell, and Michael Warren. Flame was selected to be a part of the Irish Artists' Century exhibition at the RHA in 2000. A large stainless steel flame now also forms part of the Shekina Sculpture Garden collection in County Wicklow.

One of her smaller sculptures in bronze was selected as the graphic symbol of the Polish Business Roundtable award, a prestigious Polish award for outstanding business people and social activists. A replica of the sculpture is used as the award trophy.

Today, some of Alexandra Wejchert's remaining works are occasionally exhibited and sold at Desa Unicum in Warsaw, the biggest and oldest art auction house in Poland.

== Works ==
Alexandra Wejchert's artworks can roughly be grouped in three main categories: drawings and paintings; reliefs; large and small sculpture. The artist also created a small number of graphics prints. The three categories roughly correspond to the chronological development of her work, but with some twists and turns, as on occasion she returned to earlier forms of expression later in her career. She mainly used the materials of wood, perspex, bronze, brass and stainless steel. Practically all her work is abstract in nature.

=== Drawings and Paintings ===
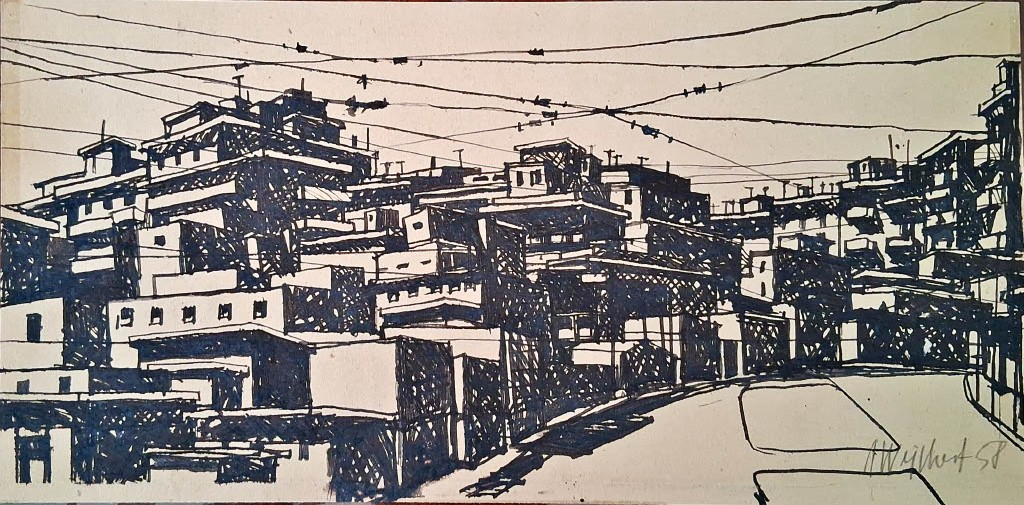
Alexandra Wejchert Ink Drawing, Cityscape Italy, 1958

Her earliest works were initial sketches and drawings. She produced these shortly after her studies at the Academy of Fine Arts in Warsaw, during several cultural visits to Italy, primarily to Rome, in the late 1950s. Such cultural visits were amongst the only ways artists or architects could officially leave Poland for short periods under the communist regime. Her drawings in Italy were primarily ink-on-paper studies of architecture and the cityscapes of the time.

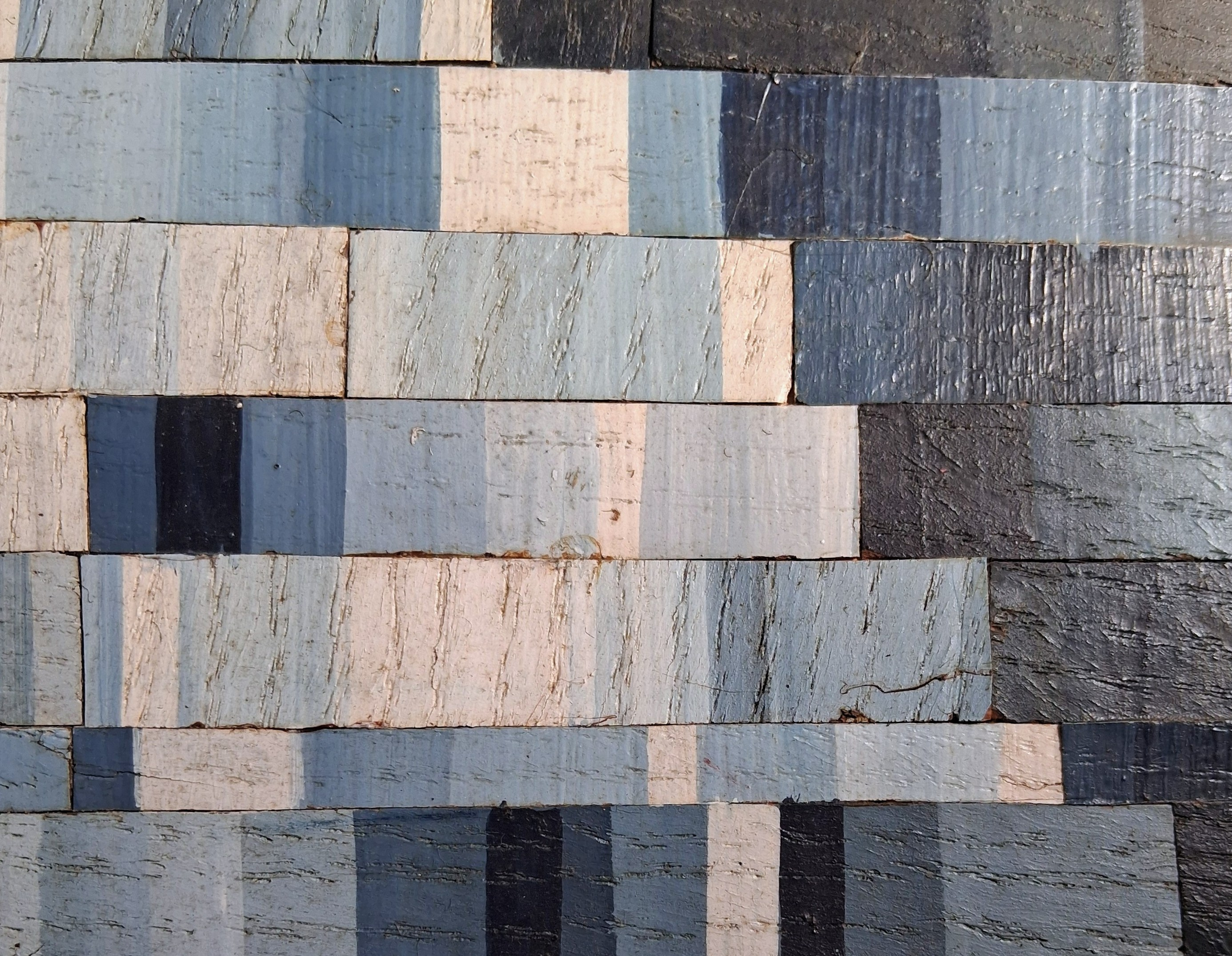
A close-up of Alexandra Wejchert's Blue Glowing Form, 1965

Later, some of these ink drawings, such as of urban housing and cityscapes, later developed into more abstract experiments and paintings, in which she explored and elaborated some of the underlying cubical and geometrical forms. She achieved this by painting sections of small wooden slats in different hues that were then assembled in a mosaic fashion to create geometrical yet harmonious compositions, such as Blue Glowing Form, 1965. She went on the create some further paintings using the same technique, such as depicted the cover catalogue of her first solo exhibition in Ireland at the Molesworth Gallery in 1966. Wejchert also started exploring painted textured surfaces, in a style closely related to that of her paintings. A base of sand, small pebbles were set in glue on the top surface of a wooden frame. This raw, textured surface was then later painted. One of these artworks, featured a pale blue-white elongated prism-eye form hovering above a turbulent dark background. In talking about this work, she said that the pale blue eye represented the ray of hope that she saw rising above much of the darkness she had experienced during the war and afterwards during the Communist regime. Her art became a way of moving beyond her past, to a future that explored completely new horizons.

=== Reliefs ===
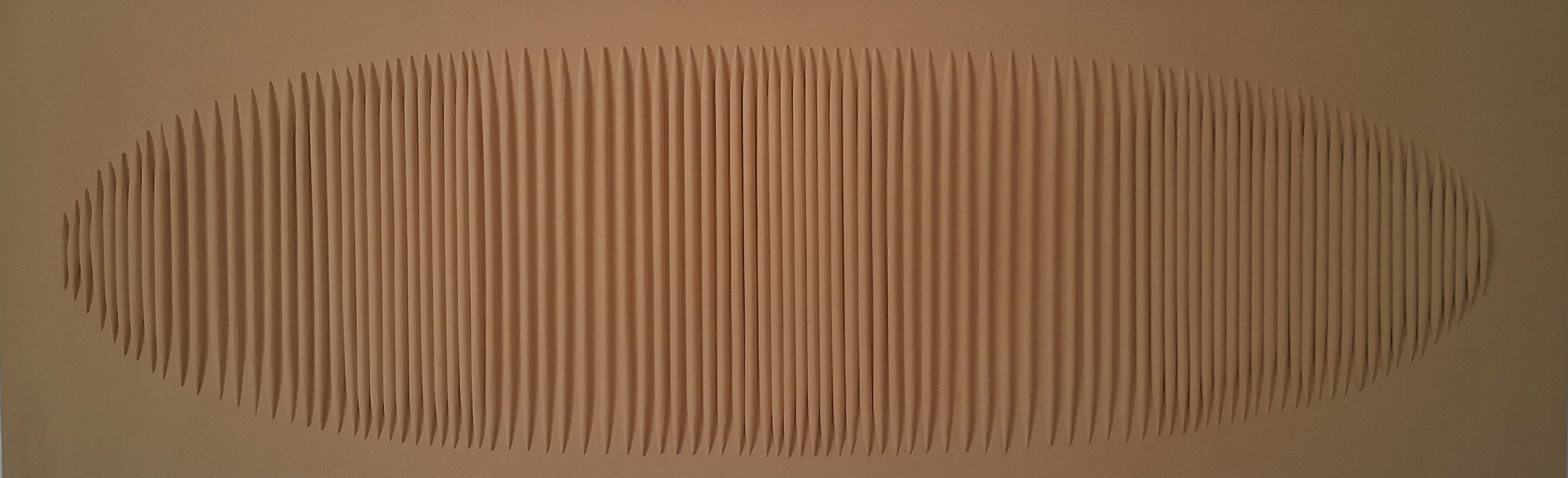
Alexandra Wejchert Painted Oval Relief 1966

Already in 1966 in preparation for her solo exhibition at the Molesworth Gallery in Dublin, Wejchert had started exploring a new technique for wooden reliefs. These works were based on a wooden background frame partially covered with geometrically arranged, finely sculpted smooth wooded segments. Using this approach, she created a number of reliefs, including oval forms, such as Painted Oval Relief 1996, with a repeating vertical geometrical pattern that emanated out of a static, planar background. Later, in her entries to the Irish Exhibition of Living Art in 1967 and 1968, and later for her 1969 solo exhibition at the David Hendriks Gallery in Dublin, her reliefs started to further expand and emanate out of their planar backgrounds. For these she developed her well known dowel reliefs that employed wooden dowels (cylindrical wooden rods of around 2 cm in diameter) cut to various lengths and polished to different angles. They were arranged to cover the entire background frame, creating captivating mathematical forms and surfaces, radiating towards the viewer. In 1968, she won the prestigious Carroll Open Award at the Irish Exhibition of Living Art for one of her larger compositions, Frequency no. 5, a large two-piece dowel composition. Other reliefs started practically to become sculptures in themselves, such as her compositions employing white spheres contrasted with black tubing. In the Four Dimensional Composition 1969, its background textured surface, already became three dimensional in itself – subsequently vigorously interwoven with black tubing, potentially alluding to an imaginary fourth dimension. It is clear that Wejchert's gradual departure from two dimensional forms of expression had become manifest.

=== Perspex Sculpture ===
Amongst Wejchert's first explorations in sculpture were created using the material perspex. The material becomes malleable when raised in temperature, and she used this approach to transform previously cut sections of perspex into flowing three dimensional forms. One of these perspex sculptures, made out of two sections, was originally bought by the Bank of Ireland, as part of the Bank of Ireland Art Collection, and was permanently exhibited at their headquarters. Later the sculpture was donated, and now forms part of collection of the Irish Museum of Modern Art, IMMA in Dublin.

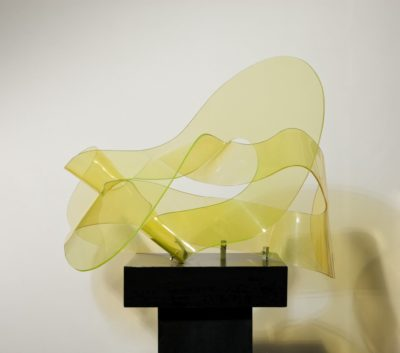
Alexandra Wejchert Green Lines Perspex Sculpture 1974. IMMA Collection, Photo: Denis Mortell Photography

In her book Modern Art in Ireland, art critic Dorothy Walker, wrote: Alexandra Wejchert worked in the unlikely material of coloured perspex. Wejchert's pieces for the Bank of Ireland remain among her best, taking advantage of the malleability of perspex and of its property of showing acomplementary colour along the cut edge.

She went on the experiment and create larger sculptures in perspex, however, she found that the material was not strong enough to bear their weight, including a piece she called Homage to Stravinsky, and this led her to start working in metals, such as bronze, brass and stainless steel.

=== Large Sculpture ===
One of her earliest large metal sculptures was a tryptic in anodised aluminium named, Life, completed in 1973. The work consisted of an ensemble of two wall reliefs and one free-standing piece that wrapped around a frontal column. Life was a centrally balanced and unified triptych specifically designed for the entrance hall of the Irish Life headquarters in Abbey St, Dublin. It was disassembled in the late 1980s during refurbishment and unfortunately was never reinstated. Another large sculpture was commissioned in the same buildings. This was a suspended sculpture also made out of anodised aluminium that hung in sections from a reflective ceiling. It was made out of long sections of anodised tubing closely stacked together in curved lines. A photograph of this large suspended sculpture is available as part of the NIVAL collection.

Later, one of her largest sculptures was commissioned by the Allied Irish Bank (AIB). This 11.5 metre high stainless steel sculpture, named Freedom, was erected at the entrance of the AIB headquarters in Ballsbridge, Dublin, in 1985. The building was designed by Andrew Devane, a well-known Irish architect, who had studied with, and was influenced by Frank Loyd Wright. The sheer size and weight of a 11.5m high sculpture required extensive collaboration with structural engineers. The National Irish Visual Arts Library (NIVAL) hosts interesting images of the construction and installation Freedom at the time.

In 2021, under a long-term loan agreement between the AIB and Maynooth University, the Freedom sculpture was moved to the Maynooth University North Campus, as a publicly accessible exterior artwork for the community and the wider region. Freedom is considered to be one of Ireland's significant public sculptures. The unveiling of the sculpture at its new location and the scale of the relocation effort for this large sculpture, is captured in a video, Unveiling of Freedom, produced by Maynooth University.

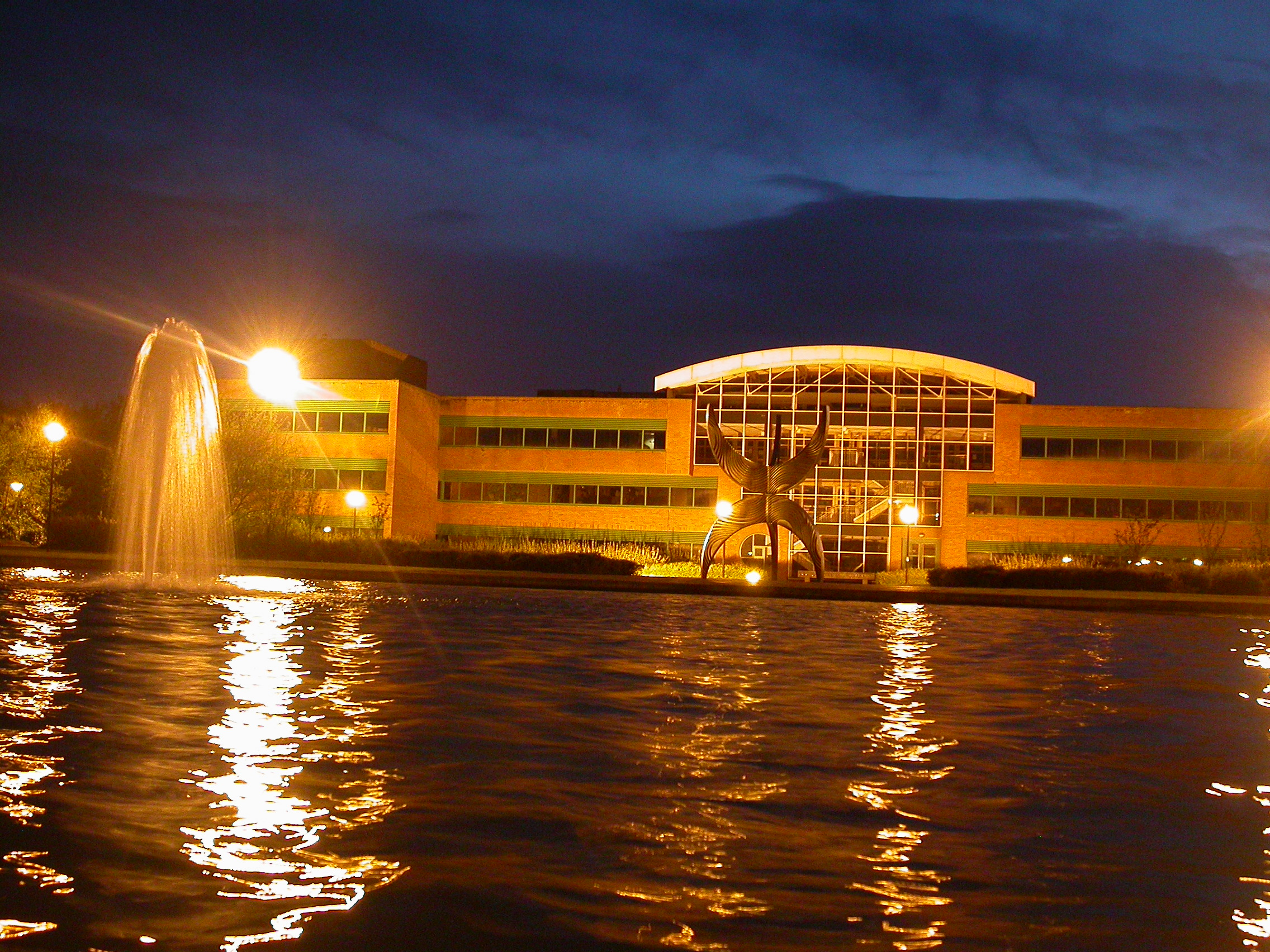
Phoenix Sculpture at night, University of Limerick

Alongside with Freedom, the sculpture that she named Phoenix (also commonly named Geometrical Form) are amongst her best known large public sculptures. Phoenix was installed at the University of Limerick in 1991. The sculpture stands firmly on four struts symmetrically planted in the ground – juxtaposed with four symmetrical limbs, reaching up into the sky. Its textured surfaces of stainless steel edges add a lyrical element, that can be seen more clearly at closer quarters. A video showing the Limerick University outdoor sculpture collection, shows the sculpture standing proudly in front of the Schumann building on the University of Limerick campus.

Wejchert also worked on a large stainless steel relief, that remains untitled. This was a large diamond-shaped stainless steel relief, with diamond-shaped elements, that was commissioned by and installed at the Lombard and Ulster Bank building in Dublin, in 1980. An image of this relief is available as part of the NIVAL collection. Another of her large sculptures was created using a large number of small oval discs in stainless steel, suspended from steel, branch-like structures reaching downwards. This suspended piece was later donated to the Irish Museum of Modern Art (IMMA) by the Wejchert family.

"Wejchert’s work sits at the intersection of several abstract art movements, including constructivism, kinetic art, and op-art. Her practice reflects an interest in formal structures, many of her pieces also convey a strong sense of movement, and the repetition of forms". Irish Museum of Modern Art

Although smaller in dimensions, two other larger sculptures of note are her bronze Flame at University College Cork, Anatomy Department and the outdoor stainless steel flame sculpture at the Shekina Sculpture Garden.

=== Graphics ===
Wejchert also created some graphical prints. Amongst her most notable is her Seven Colours graphic, as shown in the Career section, with bold contrasts of white, black and vermilion. She wanted the seven colours to be imagined by the viewer in each of the seven oval shapes in the black frame.

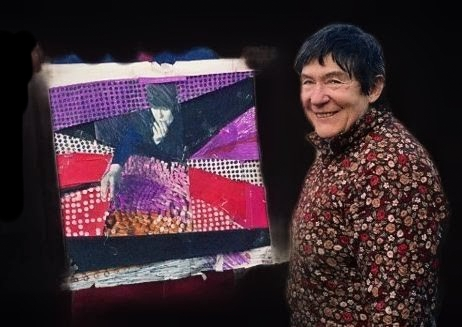
Artist in front of self portrait graphic prototype c.1980.

She also made contribution to the National Self-Portrait Collection of Ireland, that features a depiction of her working on one of her dowel pieces, executed in bold contrasts of white, black and yellow. The picture here shows Wejchert in front of a prototype of the graphic, for which later she changed the colour composition.

=== Small Sculpture ===
Towards the end of her life she increasingly worked on smaller metal sculptures, in bronze, brass and stainless steel. Some of these works are ostensibly amongst her more personally accessible, making a connection at a human level and scale.

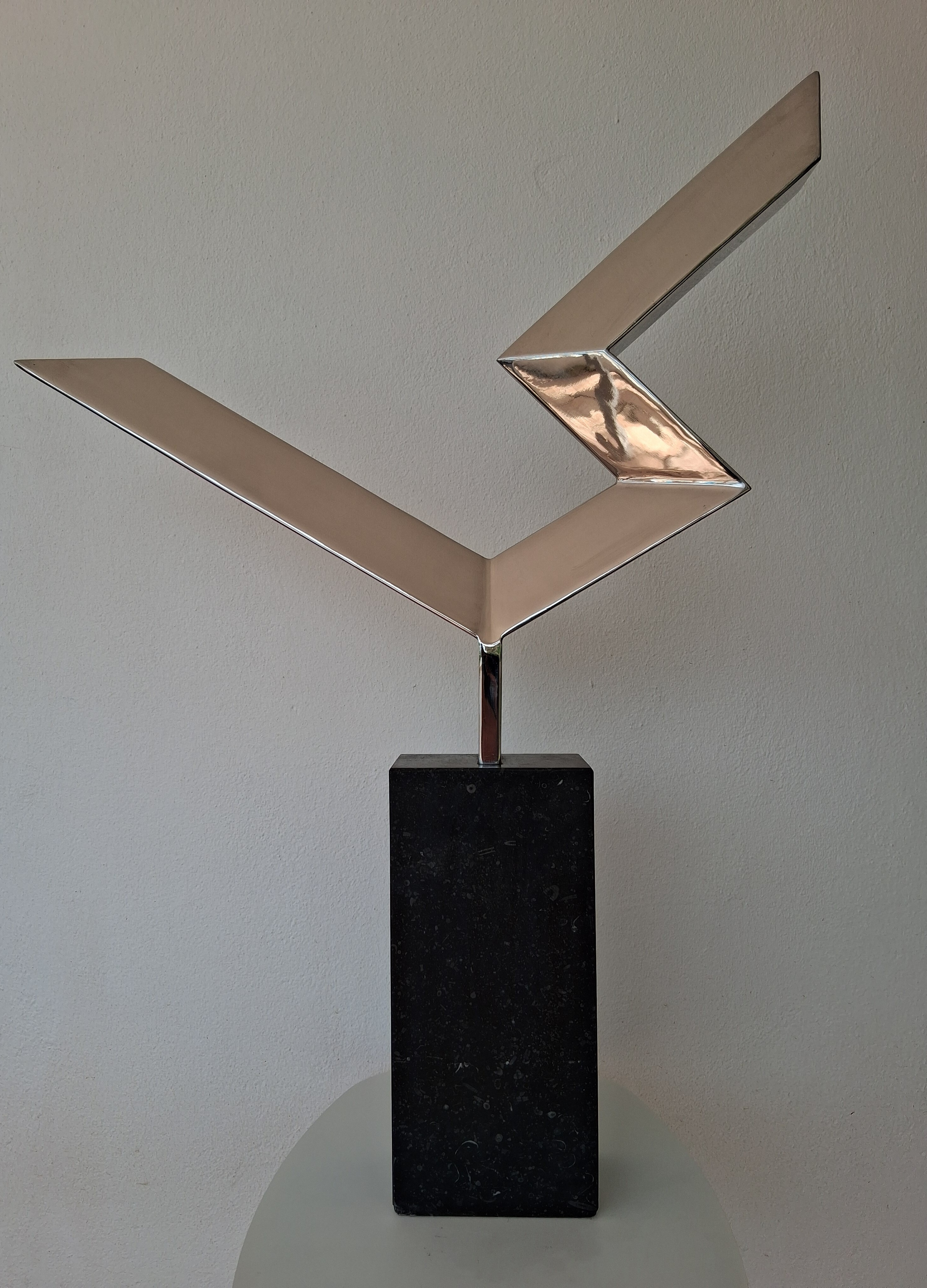
Alexandra Wejchert Untitled Stainless Steel Lines on Limestone Base

Some of her initial works in smaller sculpture, built on her earlier exploration of geometrical shapes, but now were executed in three dimensions, in stainless steel or brass. Examples include her symmetrical crystalline structures in brass on granite bases, or her angular stainless steel sculptures such as Untitled Stainless Steel Lines on a limestone base.

She created several bronze sculptures, in long, oval-like forms, with a rough and deep overall texture but with a polished finish. These were made using wax-based molds. Some were exhibited at Dublin's Millennium celebrations that included cultural events and exhibitions around the city in 1988.

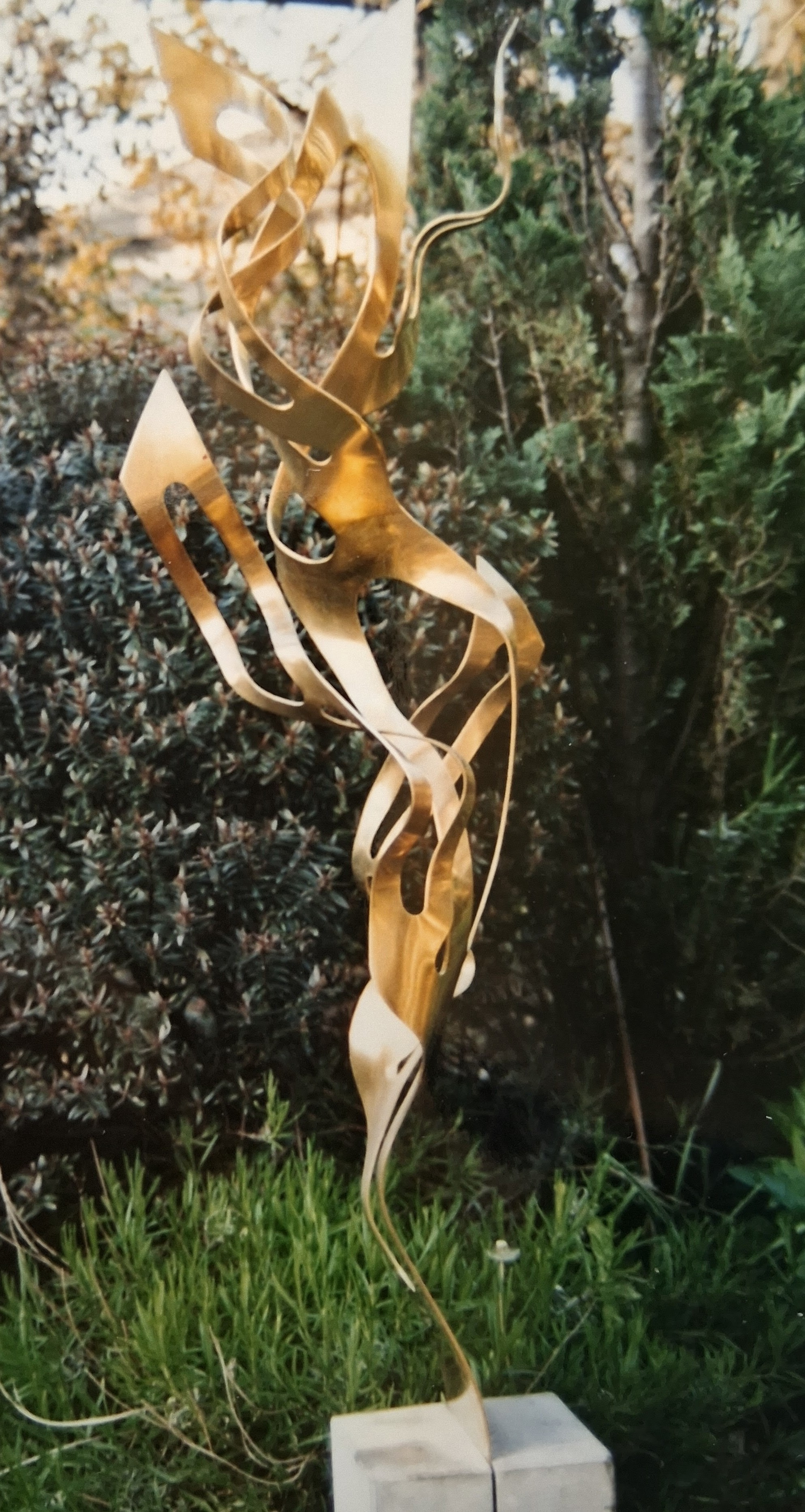
One of Wejchert's Flames, Eglinton Cottage garden, final polishing, mid 1980s

In another direction for her small sculpture, she built on her previous work in perspex, but now executed in brass or stainless steel. For these, previously cut sheets of metal were laboriously worked into flowing, floating surfaces.

A number of these smaller sculptures were shown at various exhibitions at the Solomon Gallery in Dublin, from the mid to late 1980s, including a solo exhibition in 1992. She continued to be exhibited there through the end of her life, and also posthumously, such as the Women Sculptors Exhibition in June 1996.

Her overall direction in her later works explored forms that reflected the rhythms and flows found in nature. One can note a departure from the purely geometrical, towards an vibrant expression of the designs and "hidden harmonies" found in the natural world, all executed in the demanding materials of bronze, brass or stainless steel. This direction is captured in her own words in Final Note, a short personal statement of self-reflection that she wrote in the last year of her life.

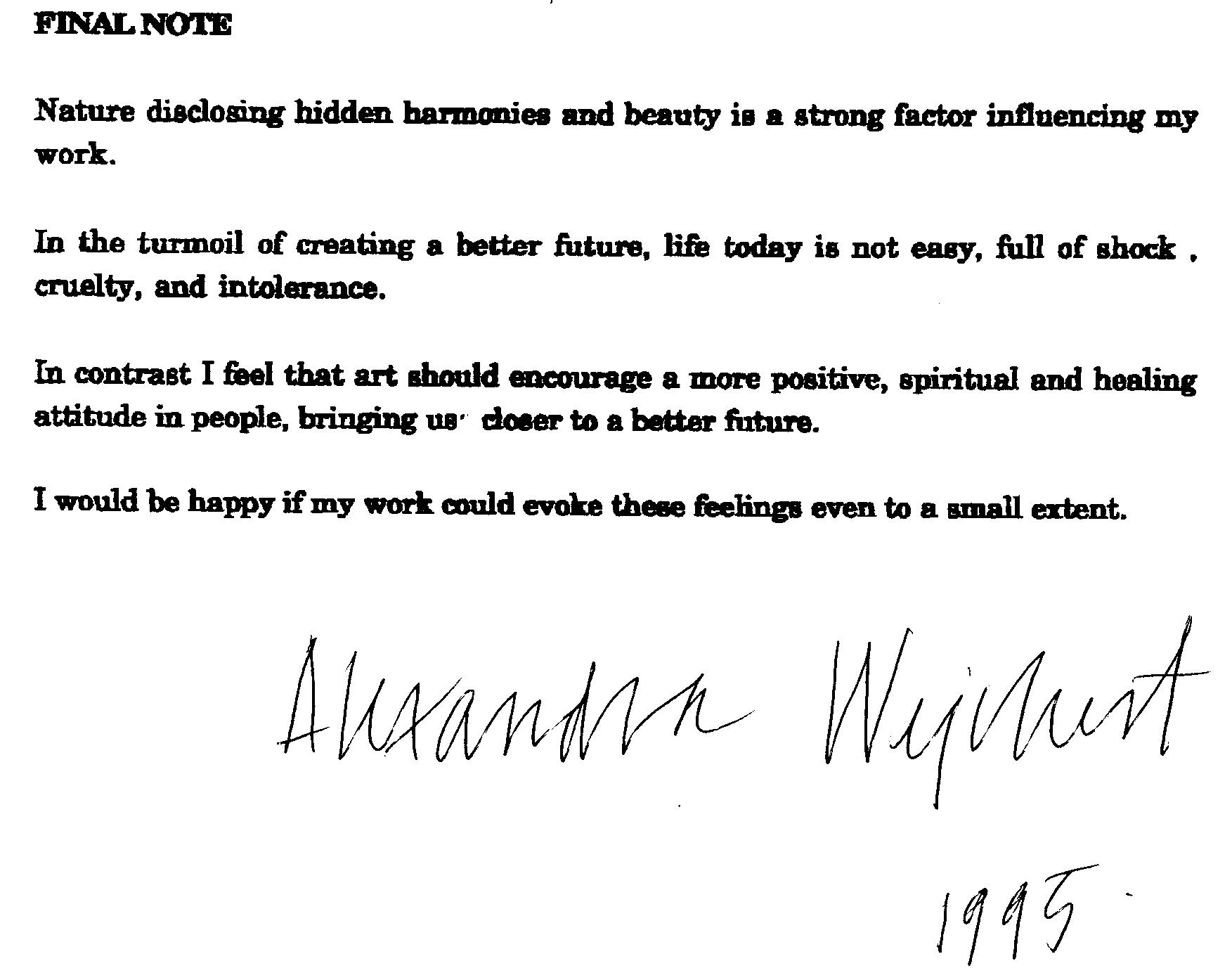
Alexandra Wejchert Final Note 1995

This led her to create some of her most sought after works, such as her upwardly reaching flames sculpted in brass, set on limestone bases. These she continued making right up to the end of her life. As mentioned previously, she created large flames such as at University College Cork, and at the Shekina Sculpture Garden. However, she also created a number of smaller bronze flames, roughly up to one metre in height, or less, several of which are now in private collections. In brass she also created some of her smallest sculptures, such as Untitled Small Oval Form on a granite base, roughly 12x10 cm, or the intimate Cave of Dreams, of similar scale, that was featured at the Toyamura International Sculpture Biennale, Japan in 1993.

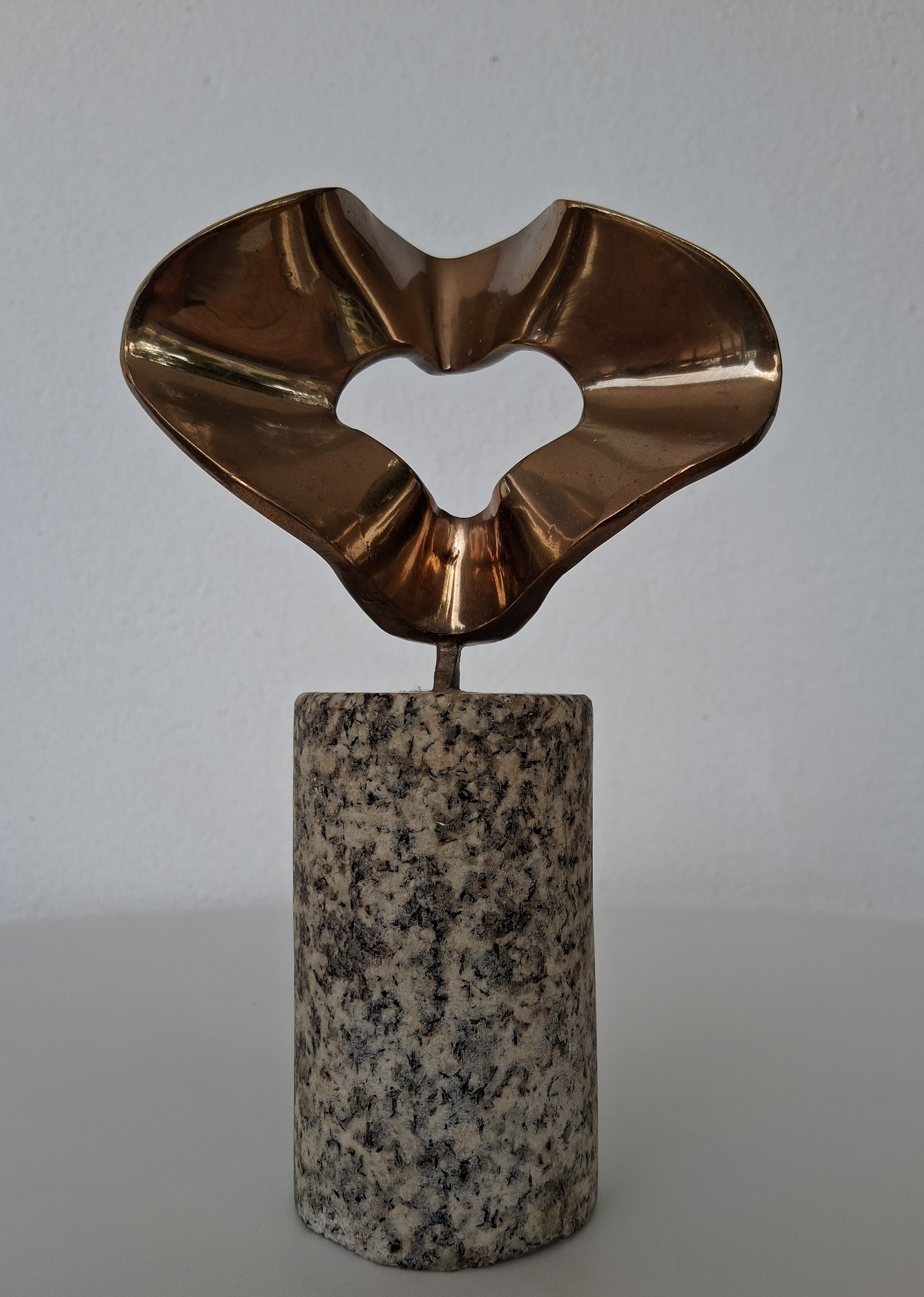
Alexandra Wejchert Untitled Brass Small Oval Form on Granite Base

After her death, the critic Brian Fallon wrote "Alexandra Wejchert was...directly in the line of Mitteleuropean abstraction and constructivism, a master of form without being a formalist . . . she combined modernist austerity with baroque sinuosity and a special quality of aspiration expressed in her flamelike, upward writhing shapes".
