= Frankie Starlight =

- Directed by: Michael Lindsay-Hogg
- Written by: Ronan O'Leary; Chet Raymo
- Based on: The Dork of Cork by Chet Raymo
- Produced by: Noel Pearson
- Starring: Anne Parillaud; Matt Dillon; Gabriel Byrne
- Cinematography: Paul Laufer
- Edited by: Ruth Foster
- Music by: Elmer Bernstein
- Distributed by: Fine Line Features (United States); Channel Four Films (United Kingdom); Pandora Cinema (Overseas)
- Release date: 22 November 1995
- Running time: 101 minutes
- Countries: United States; United Kingdom; Ireland; France
- Language: English
- Box office: $78,168 (US)

Frankie Starlight is a 1995 drama–romantic war film directed by Michael Lindsay-Hogg. The screenplay was written by Ronan O'Leary and Chet Raymo, based on the internationally best-selling novel The Dork of Cork by Raymo.

== Plot ==
Frank Bois writes a successful first novel and finds himself looking back over his life. His mother Bernadette (Parillaud) was a French woman who, after the death of her friends and family in World War II, hid herself aboard an Allied war ship heading to Ireland, where she exchanged sexual favors for silence among the soldiers who found her on board. A nice customs agent, Jack Kelly (Byrne), allowed Bernadette to enter Ireland illegally, and they soon became a couple, even though she was already pregnant from one of the soldiers from the ship.

Bernadette gave birth to Frankie (Alan Pentony), who suffered from dwarfism. As he grew older, Frankie developed romantic feelings for Jack's daughter Emma (Georgina Cates), who did not share his feelings, while Jack taught astronomy to Frankie. Eventually, Bernadette met Terry Klout (Dillon), an American soldier she had met on the war ship, who offered to marry her. Bernadette and Frankie went with Terry to his home in Texas, but both mother and son felt they didn't belong, so they returned to the Irish home they loved. An older Bernadette eventually committed suicide, and Frank then used his life as source material for his writing.

== Principal cast ==
- Gabriel Byrne as Jack Kelly
- Anne Parillaud as Bernadette
- Matt Dillon as Terry Klout
- Corban Walker as Frank Bois
- Rudi Davies as Emma
  - Georgina Cates as Young Emma
- Dearbhla Molloy as Effa Kelly

== Filming ==
The "expansive" driveway which leads up to Harristown House in County Kildare, Ireland, as well as the private estate bridge, appeared in the film.

== Critical reception ==
Janet Maslin of The New York Times thought the film was flawed but decent and did not think highly of Parillaud's acting:

Sincere, serious and more than a little strange... Quirky as it is, this earnest film offers few real surprises and only fleeting charms. One of its disappointments is the listless performance by Anne Parillaud, the fiery star of La Femme Nikita, who moves distractedly through her role. The movie, based on Chet Raymo's novel The Dork of Cork, tries hard but hasn't much glimmer of its own.

On the review aggregator website Rotten Tomatoes, the film holds an approval rating of 67%, based on 6 reviews, with an average rating of 5.5/10.
