= Deadlines (film) =

- Directed by: Ludi Boeken; Michael Alan Lerner
- Starring: Stephen Moyer; Anne Parillaud
- Release date: 24 January 2004 (IFFR)
- Running time: 1h 43min
- Countries: France; United Kingdom; Tunisia
- Language: English

Deadlines is a 2004 French / British / Tunisian action film directed by Ludi Boeken and Michael Alan Lerner.

== Cast ==
- Stephen Moyer – Alex Randal
- Anne Parillaud – Julia Muller
- Omid Djalili – Abdul Sayyaf
- Georges Siatidis – Yann Meschen
- Ibrahim Zarrouk – Ali
- Larry Lamb – Paul Baker
- Lotfi Dziri – Rahman
