= French Exit (1995 film) =

- Directed by: Daphna Kastner
- Written by: Michael Alan Lerner; Daphna Kastner
- Produced by: Carl Colpaert
- Starring: Mädchen Amick; Jonathan Silverman
- Cinematography: Geza Sinkovics
- Edited by: Claudia Finkle
- Music by: Alex Wurman
- Production companies: Cineville; Daylight Productions
- Distributed by: Columbia TriStar Home Video
- Release date: September 12, 1995 (Toronto)
- Running time: 92 minutes
- Country: United States
- Language: English

French Exit is a 1995 American romantic comedy film directed by Daphna Kastner and starring Mädchen Amick and Jonathan Silverman. It is Kastner's directorial debut.

== Plot ==
Davis meets Zina in a car wreck. Their immediate attraction for one another is put into jeopardy when they learn each is competing for the same writing job.

== Cast ==
- Mädchen Amick as Zina
- Jonathan Silverman as Davis
- Molly Hagan as Alice
- Vince Grant as Charles
- Kurt Fuller as Stubin
- Beth Broderick as Andie Ross
- Bruce Nozick as Seller
- Craig Vincent as Frank
- Steven Brill as Ben
- Cecilia Peck as Airline Ticket Agent
- Rebecca Broussard as Green Sweater Bimbette
