= Map of the Human Heart =

1992 film by Vincent Ward

- Theatrical release poster
- Directed by: Vincent Ward
- Screenplay by: Louis Nowra
- Story by: Vincent Ward
- Produced by: Tim Bevan; Vincent Ward
- Starring: Patrick Bergin; Anne Parillaud; Jason Scott Lee; Ben Mendelsohn; Robert Joamie; Annie Galipeau; Jeanne Moreau; Clotilde Courau; John Cusack
- Cinematography: Eduardo Serra
- Edited by: John Scott; Frans Vandenburg
- Music by: Gabriel Yared
- Production companies: Working Title Films; PolyGram Filmed Entertainment; Australian Film Finance Corporation
- Distributed by: Hoyts-Fox-Columbia TriStar Films (Australia); Miramax Films (North America); Ariane Distribution (France); Rank Film Distributors (United Kingdom)
- Release date: 7 May 1992
- Running time: 109 minutes
- Countries: Australia; Canada; France; United Kingdom
- Language: English
- Budget: US$13 million
- Box office: US$5 million

Map of the Human Heart (also called Carte du Tendre and La Carte du Tendre; released in the Philippines as War Dragon) is a 1992 film by New Zealand director Vincent Ward. The script for Map of the Human Heart was written by Australian author Louis Nowra, using a 10-page treatment Ward had written a year earlier as his guide. Ward was originally intended at this time to be directing his script of the third film in the Alien series, but his dismissal from the sci fi project (leaving him credited solely as providing the story) led to his directing this film instead.

Map of the Human Heart, set mostly before and during the Second World War, centres on the life of Avik, a Canadian Inuk boy. The film stars Robert Joamie and Jason Scott Lee as the youth and adult Avik. His love, Albertine (played as a child by Annie Galipeau and as an adult by Anne Parillaud) is countered by the imposing Walter Russell (Patrick Bergin), who plays a pivotal role as both surrogate father to Avik and his primary rival in Albertine's love. Jeanne Moreau has a minor role as a Québécois nun. John Cusack also has a small but important role as the mapmaker to whom Avik relates his incredible tale.

== Plot ==
In 1931, in the Arctic-Canadian settlement of Nunataaq, Avik (Robert Joamie) lives under the watchful eye of his grandmother (Jayko Pitseolak) who undertakes senicide by jumping in the cold sea. While tagging along after British cartographer Walter Russell (Patrick Bergin), Avik falls prey to tuberculosis, the "white man's disease". To assuage his own guilt, Russell takes the boy to a Montreal clinic to recover. There, Avik meets Albertine (Annie Galipeau), a Métis girl. The two fall in love, but their relationship is quickly broken up by the Mother Superior who is in charge of the clinic.

Years later, Avik again meets Russell, who this time is on a mission to recover a German U-boat lying wrecked off the coast of Nunataaq. Throughout his life, Avik is haunted by love for a now-grown Albertine (Anne Parillaud) and by a belief that he brings misfortune to those around him. Avik asks for Russell's help in learning her whereabouts, and he gives the cartographer a chest X-ray of the girl which he has carried with him since their separation.

More time elapses, and a mature Avik (Jason Scott Lee) joins the Royal Canadian Air Force in the Second World War and eventually becomes a bomb aimer in an Avro Lancaster bomber. Albertine, who has become Russell's mistress, seeks out Avik. She begins an affair with Avik, but Russell soon finds out, and as revenge, he sends Avik and his crew on a suicide mission (the firebombing of Dresden), in which Avik is the sole survivor of his crew.

Despondent over his war experiences, Avik flees to Canada, where he becomes an alcoholic. Decades later, he is sought out by Rainee (Clotilde Courau), the daughter born from his affair with Albertine. On his way to the girl's wedding, Avik crashes his snowmobile on an ice floe; as he freezes to death (similar to his grandmother), he dreams of going to his daughter's wedding and flying away on a balloon with Albertine.

== Cast ==
- Jason Scott Lee as Avik
  - Robert Joamie as Young Avik
- Anne Parillaud as Albertine
  - Annie Galipeau as Young Albertine
- Patrick Bergin as Walter Russell
- Clotilde Courau as Rainee
- John Cusack as The Mapmaker
- Jeanne Moreau as Sister Banville
- Ben Mendelsohn as Farmboy
- Jerry Snell as Boleslaw
- Jayko Pitseolak as Avik's grandmother
- Matt Holland as flight navigator
- Rebecca Vevee as Inuk cook
- Josape Kopalee as Inuk elder
- Reepah Arreak as Avik's girlfriend

== Production ==
Map of the Human Heart's re-creation of the firebombing of Dresden is one of the most graphic and powerful sequences in the film. On the day Ward finished shooting those scenes, he received word that his father, who had actually participated in the historical firebombing of Dresden, had died. This is why Ward chose to dedicate the film to him.

The scenes in "Nunataaq", the region of Northern Canada where Avik's people are from, were filmed on location in what is now Nunavut, using local Inuit as extras. Two other scenes received attention. The first one is a pivotal love scene that takes place on top of an English military blimp (not in a cabin or gondola but actually on top of the blimp), the other is the final scene of the film which has a twist ending.

== Release ==
Map of the Human Heart premiered out-of-competition at the 1992 Cannes Film Festival. In Australia, the film was released on 22 April 1993. The film was released in the Philippines by First Films as War Dragon on 29 June 1994.

=== Critical response ===
Map of the Human Heart has an almost even rank between critics and audience at review aggregator website Rotten Tomatoes, indicating that the film is liked by both parties. The site's ranking shows that 23 critics approve the film at 78%, with an average ranking stands at 6.8/10. On Metacritic, basing on 18 critics, the film holds a 71 out of a 100, indicating "generally favorable reviews".

Map of the Human Heart was critically well received by many film critics. Roger Ebert noted: "Map of the Human Heart tells a soaring story of human adventure – adventure of the best kind, based not on violence, but on an amazing personal journey. It is incredible sometimes what distances can be traveled in a single human life, and this is a movie about a man who could not have imagined his end in his beginning."

Brian Case in the 2004 Time Out Film Guide, said: "Ward's ambitious epic love story covers two continents and three decades and, its execution apart, could have sprung from one of those fat romantic chronicles written for the typing pool. But Ward has an extravagant visual imagination so that even the more outlandish scenes, like the hero and heroine finally consummating their passion on a half-deflated barrage balloon, linger in the mind. Where lack of money cramps his vision of WWII bombing raids on Germany, the director achieves a pleasing shorthand with lighting."

Hal Hinson of The Washington Post said that the film is of "incantatory intensity".

=== Box office ===
Map of the Human Heart grossed A$539,000 at the box office in Australia; £251,167 in the United Kingdom; US$2,806,881 in the United States and Canada and $5 million worldwide.

=== Accolades ===
Map of the Human Heart was screened out of competition at the 1992 Cannes Film Festival. The film was nominated for the 1993 Australian Film Institute Awards where the film won as Best Film, and Vincent Ward as Best Director and Robert Joamie won in the category of Young Actor. Map of the Human Heart was also nominated for Best Original Music Score, Best Achievement in Sound, Editing and Cinematography categories. The film was also a winner in the 1993 Tokyo International Film Festival where Vincent Ward won the Best Artistic Contribution Award, and Robert Joamie along with Anne Parillaud won Special Mention for a Talent of the Future award. Further, Vincent Ward was nominated in the Tokyo Grand Prix. Jason Scott Lee was also nominated in the 1994 Chicago Film Critics Association Awards for Most Promising Actor.

== See also ==
- Cinema of Australia
- Cinema of the UK

== Bibliography ==
- Pym, John, ed. "Map of the Human Heart." Time Out Film Guide. London: Time Out Guides Limited, 2004. ISBN 978-0-14101-354-1.
