= Corban Walker =

Irish sculptor (born 1967)

- Born: 1967 (age 58–59); Dublin, Ireland
- Education: National College of Art and Design
- Known for: Sculpture
- Notable work: Untitled (116 Stack @5⁰); Bushy; Grid Stack 2
- Parent(s): Robin Walker; Dorothy Walker
- Elected: Aosdána
- Website: corbanwalkerstudio.com

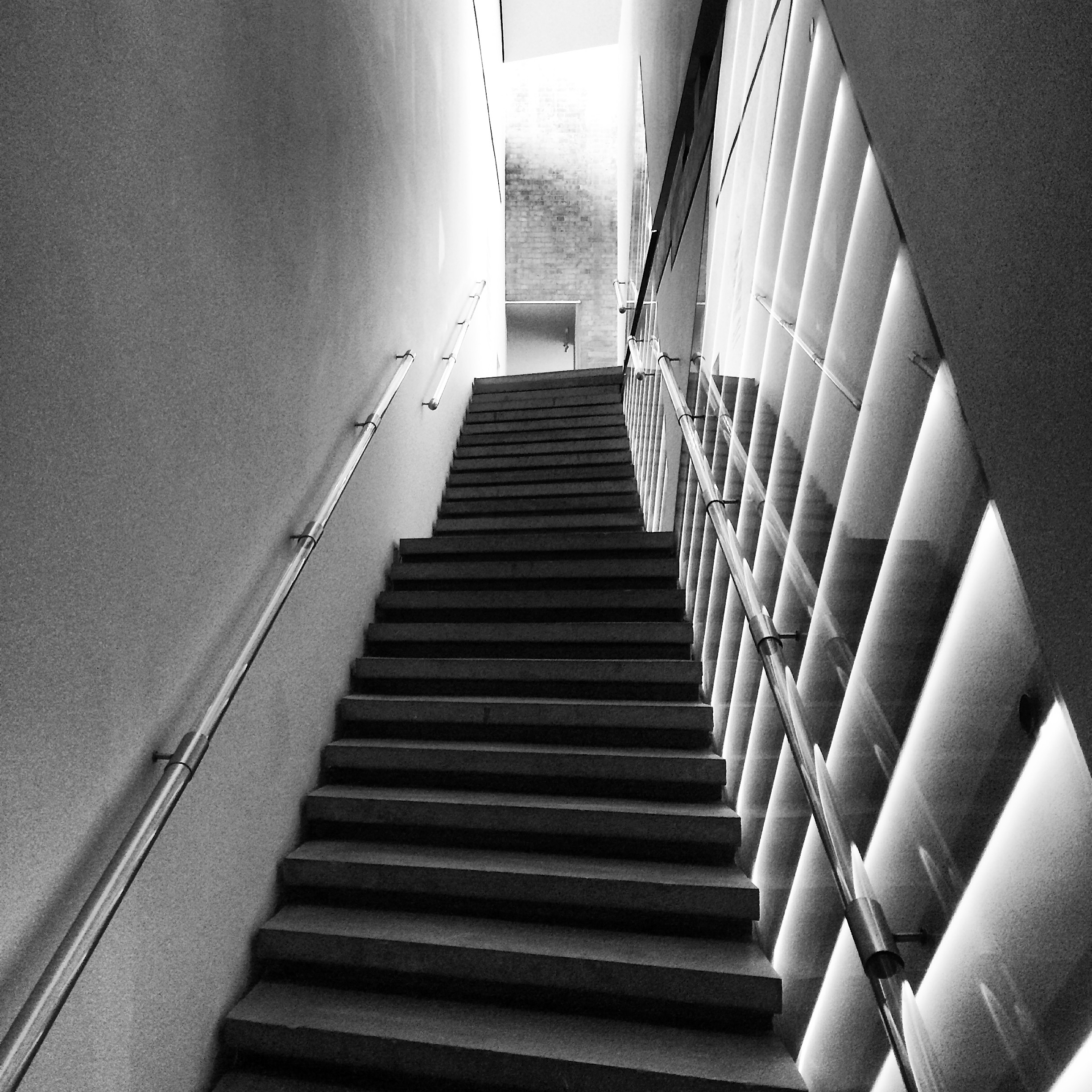
Staircase by Walker and Erick van Egeraat in the Crawford Gallery, Cork.

Corban Walker (born 1967) is an Irish sculptor.

== Early life ==
Walker was born in Dublin in 1967. His father was Robin Walker, an architect of the firm Scott Tallon Walker, and his mother was the art critic Dorothy Walker. He was born with achondroplasia, a form of dwarfism, and as an adult is 4 ft (120 cm) tall. He attended Gonzaga College.

== Career ==
In 1985, Walker decided to become an artist after seeing The Pont Neuf Wrapped in Paris. He studied sculpture at the National College of Art and Design (NCAD, Dublin) from 1987 to 1991.

He also acted for a time, appearing in Frankie Starlight (1995) and How to Cheat in the Leaving Certificate (1997).

Walker works with slate, stainless steel, glass and fluorescent tubes. According to National Sculpture Factory, Walker is known for "his installations, sculptures, and drawings that relate to perceptions of scale and architectural constructs. His local, cultural, and specific philosophies of scale are fundamental to how he defines and develops his work, creating new means for viewers to interact with and navigate their surroundings."

Walker was elected to Aosdána in 2011. He also represented Ireland at the 54th Venice Biennale in that same year. He received the Pollock-Krasner Award in 2015. Walker’s latest public sculpture, Bushy, was unveiled in 2022 in Bushy Park, Dublin.
