= Ludi Boeken =

Dutch film producer, director and actor

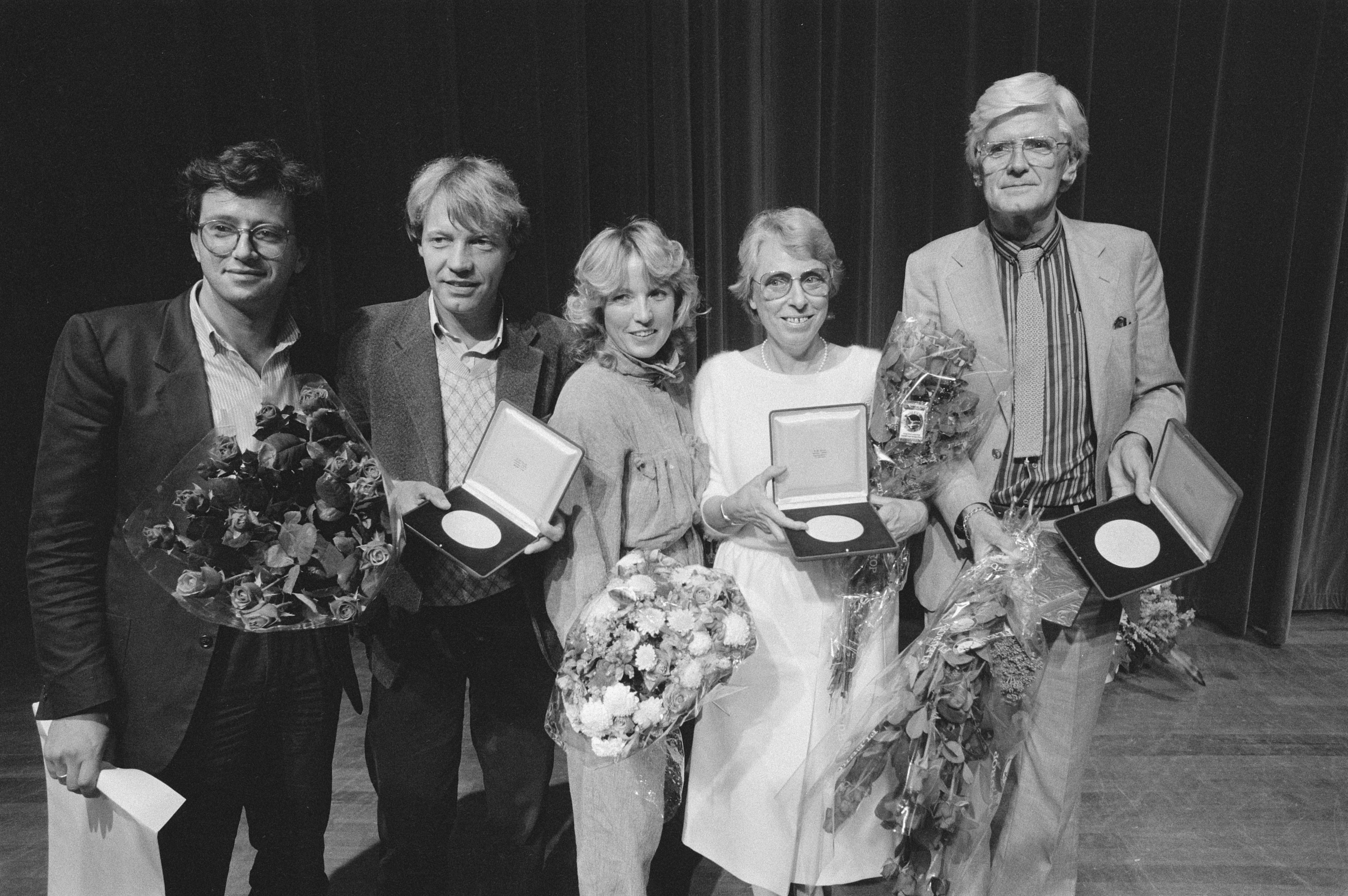
- On the far left
- Born: 1951 (age 74–75); Amsterdam, Netherlands
- Education: Tel Aviv University
- Years active: 1987-present

Ludi Boeken (born 1951 in Amsterdam) is a Dutch film producer, director and actor. His daughter, Julia Levy-Boeken, is an actress.

== Biography ==
He was born in Amsterdam to Jewish family. He attended the London Film School from 1970 to 1973, and Tel Aviv University from 1973 to 1976.

He started his career as a war correspondent for the BBC and for Dutch television in the Middle East, South America, Central America, and Africa.

He is a partner at Acajou Films, a film production company, with Pascal Judelewicz.

In the years of 2004 and 2007, he was executive director of Terranova, a German TV station.

== Filmography ==
=== As a producer ===
- Unsettled Land (dir. Uri Barbash, 1987).
- Wherever You Are... (dir. Krzysztof Zanussi, 1988).
- Vincent & Theo (dir. Robert Altman, 1990).
- La fracture du myocarde (dir. Jacques Fansten, 1990).
- Silent Tongue (dir. Sam Shepard, 1993).
- Roulez jeunesse! (dir. Jacques Fansten, 1993).
- Lucky Punch (dir. Dominique Ladoge, 1996).
- Zeus and Roxanne (dir. George T. Miller, 1997).
- Kings for a Day (dir. François Velle, 1997).
- Train of Life (dir. Radu Mihăileanu, 1998).
- Britney, Baby, One More Time (2002)
- Deadlines (dir. Ludi Boeken, Michael Alan Lerner, 2004).
- Dead Cool (dir. David Cohen, 2004).
- The Vintner's Luck (dir. Niki Caro, 2009).
- Q (dir. Laurent Bouhnik, 2011).
- Vanishing Waves (dir. Kristina Buozyte, 2012).
- Jappeloup (dir. Christian Duguay, 2013).

=== As an actor ===
| Year | Title | Role | Notes |
|---|---|---|---|
| 1996 | Lucky Punch | | dir. Dominique Ladoge |
| 2004 | Deadlines | | dir. Ludi Boeken, Michael Alan Lerner |
| 2011 | Q | | dir. Laurent Bouhnik |
| 2013 | World War Z | Jurgen Warmbrunn | |
| 2015 | Belle & Sebastian: The Adventure Continues | Marcel | |

=== As a director ===
- Britney, Baby, One More Time (2002).
- Deadlines (2004).
- Saviors in the Night (2009).
