= Michael Alan Lerner =

American screenwriter

- Born: New York City, New York, U.S.
- Occupation: Screenwriter, film director, journalist
- Education: Harvard University
- Relatives: Alan Jay Lerner (father)

Michael Alan Lerner is a French-American screenwriter, director, and journalist.

== Early life and education ==
Lerner was born in New York City. He attended Choate Rosemary Hall and Harvard University and graduated magna cum laude with a degree in History and Literature.

== Journalism ==
Upon graduating, Lerner was hired by The New Republic magazine as a staff writer. He later joined Newsweek magazine. Lerner covered a variety of conflicts around the globe, including the war in Lebanon and the fall of apartheid in South Africa. His freelance work has appeared in the Los Angeles Times magazine, The New York Observer and GOOD Magazine.

== Film ==
=== 1990s ===
Lerner co-wrote (with Daphna Kastner) the 1997 film French Exit, starring Jonathan Silverman and Mädchen Amick.

=== 2000s ===
Lerner wrote and co-directed (with Ludi Boeken) the 2005 war thriller Deadlines, starring Anne Parillaud and Stephen Moyer, which fictionalized his experiences as a war correspondent in Beirut. The film won numerous festival awards, including Best International Film at the 2005 Santa Barbara Film Festival, Prix Tournage at the 2004 Avignon Film Festival and Best Film at the 2004 Geneva Film Festival.

=== 2010s ===
Lerner was hired to write the $16 million budget 2012 Russian war film August Eighth for director Dzhanic Fayziev.

Lerner’s next film, co-written with Oren Moverman, was the 2014 drama Love & Mercy, a biopic about the life and times of Brian Wilson of The Beach Boys. The film stars Paul Dano, John Cusack, Elizabeth Banks, and Paul Giamatti. The film was produced by River Road Entertainment.

== Filmography ==
| Year | Title | Notes |
|---|---|---|
| 1995 | French Exit | Co-written with Daphna Kastner |
| 2005 | Deadlines | Screenwriter, co-director with Ludi Boeken |
| 2012 | August Eighth | Screenwriter |
| 2015 | Love & Mercy | Co-written with Oren Moverman |

== Personal life ==
Lerner is the son of the Broadway playwright and lyricist Alan Jay Lerner (of Lerner & Loewe) and French criminal attorney Micheline Muselli Pozzo Di Borgo.
