= Laurent Bouhnik =

French filmmaker, actor

- Born: 7 April 1961 (age 64); Paris
- Occupations: Director, writer

Laurent Bouhnik (French pronunciation: [lɔʁɑ̃ bunik]) (born 7 April 1961) is a French director, writer, and actor.

Bouhnik began his career in the comic strip and illustration business. From 1988 to 1992, he worked technical image and editing jobs within his production company.

Bouhnik's film Madeleine (1999) was the first step in his project to direct one film per year between 1999 and 2009, recounting the turn of the century France in an interweaving narrative pattern.

Bouhnik teaches directing and script-writing at La Fémis in Paris. He has appeared in cameo roles in Vivante (2001), Sur un air d'autoroute (1999) and Paddy (1998).

Bouhnik is a member of the Assange support committee in France that is advocating for his release and for France to grant him political asylum.

== Selected filmography ==
Year	Title	Role	Notes
2002	24 Hours in the Life of a Woman		
2011	Q		

== Filmography ==
=== as a director ===
- 1988 : Rouge au feu (court métrage)
- 1989 : L'Alligator (court métrage)
- 1994 : Troubles ou la Journée d'une femme ordinaire (court métrage)
- 1996 : Sélect Hôtel
- 1997 : Tout va mâle (court métrage)
- 1998 : Zonzon
- 1998 : Un beau jour sans conséquence (court métrage)
- 1999 : 1999 Madeleine
- 2000 : Scénarios sur la drogue (film collectif), section Speedball
- 2000 : Deux L (court métrage)
- 2001 : Histoire d'eau dans la série Les Redoutables
- 2002 : Vingt-quatre Heures de la vie d'une femme
- 2003 : Nif (court métrage)
- 2007 : L'Invité
- 2009 : Suite noire : Vitrage à la corde (téléfilm de la série Suite noire)
- 2011 : Q
- 2016 : Entre le jour et la nuit

=== as an actor ===
- 1999 : Paddy de Gérard Mordillat
- 2000 : Sur un air d'autoroute de Thierry Boscheron
- 2002 : Vivante de Sandrine Ray
- 2016 : Super Z de Julien de Volte et Arnaud Tabarly

=== as a screenwriter ===
- 1988 : Rouge au feu
- 1989 : L'Alligator
- 1994 : Troubles ou la Journée d'une femme ordinaire
- 1997 : Sélect Hôtel
- 1999 : Speedball
- 1999 : 1999 Madeleine
- 1998 : Zonzon
- 2000 : Deux L
- 2002 : Histoire d'eau
- 2003 : Vingt-quatre Heures de la vie d'une femme
- 2006 : Mauvaise line (Bande dessinée)
- 2008 : adaptation avec Bibi Nacéri de Vitrage à la corde
- 2010 : Q
- 2016 : Entre le jour et la nuit

=== As a produceur ===
- 1997 : Sélect Hôtel
- 1999 : 1999 Madeleine
- 2010 : Q
- 2016 : Entre le jour et la nuit

== Distinctions ==
=== Rewards ===
Laurent Bouhnik's films have won 6 awards :

- 1999 : Prix Jury de la Jeunesse pour 1999 Madeleine au Festival international du film de Locarno
- 1999 : Prix d'interprétation pour Véra Briole, comédienne principale de 1999 Madeleine au Festival international du film de Locarno
- 1998 : Grand prix pour Un beau jour sans conséquence au Festival du court métrage de Clermont-Ferrand
- 1997 : Prix Romy Scheider pour Julie Gayet dans Sélect Hôtel
- 1997 : Prix Jeune Talent SACD pour Sélect Hôtel
- 1996 : Grand Prix pour Sélect Hôtel au Festival du film d'Avignon

=== Nominations and selections ===
- Festival international du film fantastique de Bruxelles en 1997
- Festival international du film de Gijón en 1998
- Festival international du film de Stockholm en 1998 et 1999
- Sochi International Film Festival en 2003
- Festival international du film francophone de Namur en 1998

== Publications ==
- Blue train de Laurent Bouhnik et Christian Cailleaux, Éditions le 9^{e} monde, 2003
- Mauvaise line de Laurent Bouhnik (texte) et Stefan Thanneur (illustrations), Éditions Emmanuel Proust, 2004
- Le César nuit gravement à la santé, Éditions Delatour France, 2018
