= Q (2011 film) =

2011 film by Laurent Bouhnik

- Theatrical release poster
- Directed by: Laurent Bouhnik
- Written by: Laurent Bouhnik
- Produced by: Chica Benadava; Ludi Boeken; Pascal Judelewicz
- Starring: Déborah Révy; Hélène Zimmer; Gowan Didi; Johnny Amaro
- Cinematography: Dominique Colin
- Edited by: Laurent Bouhnik; Valérie Pico
- Music by: Ernest Saint Laurent
- Production companies: Acajou Films; Rebel Rebel
- Distributed by: Albany Films; Aramis Films
- Release date: 14 September 2011 (France)
- Running time: 103 minutes
- Country: France
- Language: French

Q (released in the United States as Desire) is a 2011 French erotic drama film written and directed by Laurent Bouhnik.

== Plot ==
In Cherbourg, the lives of several people are turned upside down after they meet Cecile, a character who symbolizes desire. Cecile is a 20-year-old woman whose father recently died— she attempts to deal with her grief by having sexual relations with multiple lovers, including both friends and strangers. She also tries to help others reach fulfillment. In several instances her flirting leads to sex, but, in other instances, she tries to teach her partner patience and dispenses advice about how and how not to pleasure one's sexual partner.

Cecile's occasional boyfriend is Chance, a petty criminal who loves her but cannot satisfy her. Matt is a friend of Chance who is constantly pushing his girlfriend Alice to have sex with him, but Alice is not ready.

As the movie progresses, we follow these characters as they deal with their lives and relationships. Chance and his friends are trying to make a buck while running from other criminals who he has antagonized. Matt is working as an auto mechanic and trying to sleep with Alice.

Against this background, we see Cecile on a ferry boat listening in on a couple having a conversation. Cecile flirts with the man and later gives him her number. Later, we learn that the wife has had a traumatic experience which makes it difficult for her to have sex. The couple discuss having sex with Cecile and get aroused, but the wife's troubles prevent anything from happening.

That night at a bar, the friends meet and some end up pairing off. Chance and Cecile go back to his place for unfulfilling sex. Later, Cecile gets a phone call that leads to her meet the husband from the ferry in a beach hut for sex.

On the next ferry ride, Cecile meets Alice. Later, Cecile meets the wife of the man she was with at the beach. They talk and the wife opens up. Later, Cecile persuades Alice to help the couple address their marital issues. Alice arranges for the couple to meet up wearing blindfolds so they can have sex and fix their relationship.

A group of women arrange a party. Chance shows up at the party carrying Cecile's father's ashes, which she never dealt with. He tells her that he loves her and challenges her to take care of herself as she is trying to help others. They get in his car and leave. As they drive along the coast, Cecile spreads her father's ashes. Unable to find inner peace through various sexual encounters with Chance, Matt, and even Alice, Cecile finally discovers another path to healing and tells Chance that she loves him "even though it won't be easy".

== Cast ==
- Déborah Révy as Cécile
- Hélène Zimmer as Alice
- Gowan Didi as Matt
- Johnny Amaro as Chance
- Johan Libéreau as Manu
- Jean-François Gallotte as Père d'Alice
- Brice Fournier as Maurice
- Christelle Benoit as Virginie
- Patrick Hauthier as Yves
- Leticia Bellicini as Sonia
- Fabian Ara as Alex
- Margot Heurtematte as Héloïse
- Noémie Learoux-Cazaubon as Julie
- Aurélia Arto as Alizée
- Yassine Azzouz as Djamel
- Bernez Moal as Daniel
- Christine Martin as Mére d'Alice
- Lise Kerverdo as Marion

== Production ==
In 2015, Hélène Zimmer said she accepted this film because its main quality for her was the challenge it presented, but she admitted she'd be delighted if she could remove the unsimulated sex scenes.
