= Dorothy Walker (critic) =

Irish art critic (1929–2002)

- Born: Dorothy Cole; 16 January 1929; Dublin, Ireland
- Died: 8 December 2002 (aged 73); Dublin, Ireland
- Occupation: Art Critic
- Spouse: Robin Walker
- Children: 5, including Corban Walker

Dorothy Cole Walker (16 January 1929 – 8 December 2002) was an Irish art critic and a vocal champion of abstract modernism in Ireland.

== Early life and education ==
Dorothy Cole was born in Dublin in 1929, the daughter of Walter and Moira Cole, who the owned a fruit and vegetable business. She lived in Mountjoy Square, Dublin, and was educated in the Dominican Convent Wicklow and École du Louvre in Paris.

== Career ==
Walker began her career in arts journalism, as an editorial assistant at the Paris office of The New York Times. In Dublin, Walker was assistant to architect Michael Scott from 1952 to 1956, and managed a design business. She was an art critic for Radio Éireann from 1963 to 1967, and for Hibernia from 1967 to 1977. She wrote an art column for the Irish Independent in 1986, 1987 and 1989.

In 1967, she was a co-founder of the occasional modern art exhibition Rosc. She was a board member and even an interim director of the Irish Museum of Modern Art. She curated several exhibits and published several books on art, which included a rare but much admired discussion of contemporary Irish art. "She made a vigorous and at times explosive contribution to the careers of painters and the judgements of their critics," wrote her colleague Bruce Arnold in an obituary.

== Personal life and legacy ==
Cole married Michael Scott's professional partner, architect Robin Walker, in 1961; they had five children. Her husband died in 1991, and she died in 2002, at the age of 73, in Dublin. After her death the Irish Museum of Modern Art held an exhibition in her honour, featuring work by artists such as Patrick Scott and Sean Scully, whom she particularly favoured. Her son Corban Walker is a noted sculptor, who acknowledges his parents' work as influential in his own career.

== Bibliography ==
- Modern art in Ireland (Dublin: Liliput 1997) ISBN 1-874675-96-1
- Michael Scott, Architect in (casual) conversation with Dorothy Walker (Kinsale: Gandon Editions 1995)
- Without the Walls: John Aiken, James Coleman, Felim Egan, Brian King, Ciaran Lennon, Alanna O'Kelly, Michael O’Sullivan, Nigel Rolfe, Noel Sheridan (London: ICA 1980)

== Sources ==
- Caoimhín Mac Giolla Léith (2003) Dorothy Walker 1929–2002. CIRCA 103.
