= Anne Parillaud =

French actress (born 1960)

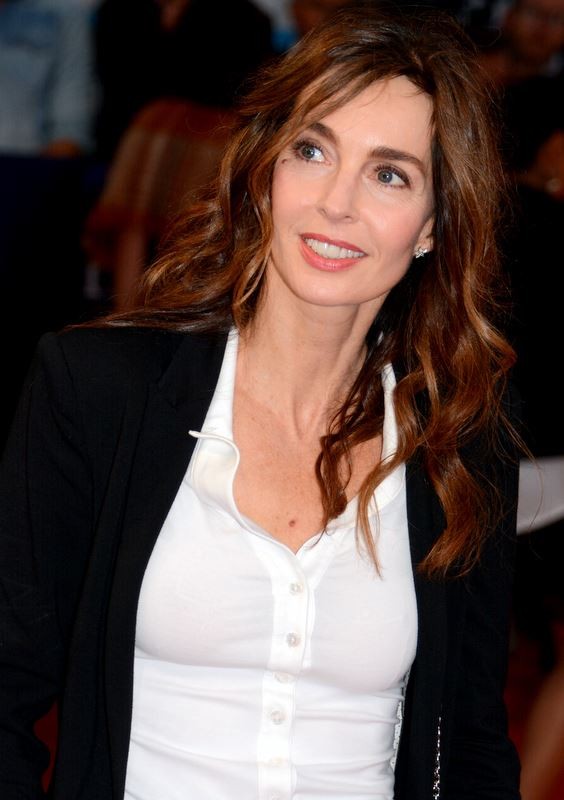
- Parillaud in 2014
- Born: 6 May 1960 (age 66); Paris, France
- Occupation: Actress
- Years active: 1977–present
- Spouses: Luc Besson (m. 1986; div. 1991) Jean Michel Jarre (m. 2005; div. 2010)
- Children: 3

Anne Parillaud (French: [an paʁijo]; born 6 May 1960) is a French actress who has been active since 1977, who is best known internationally for playing the title character in Luc Besson's film La Femme Nikita.

== Biography ==
Parillaud was born in Paris. While in school, she studied ballet but began her film career at 16 in Michel Lang's L'hôtel de la plage (1978).

She starred in Luc Besson's La Femme Nikita (1990).

After La Femme Nikita, Parillaud left France to star in three films abroad: Map of the Human Heart, Innocent Blood, and Frankie Starlight.

In 2010, she starred in the French psychological thriller In Their Sleep which was directed by Caroline du Potet and Eric du Potet.

== Personal life ==
Parillaud's first husband was Luc Besson, with whom she has a daughter. She became an actress.

In 2005, Parillaud married Jean Michel Jarre. They divorced in 2010.

== Selected filmography ==
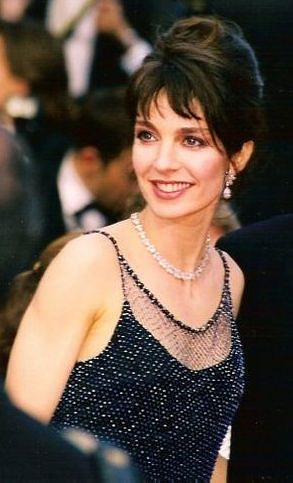
Parillaud at Cannes in 1998

Year	Title	Role	Director
1977	Un amour de sable	Uncredited	Christian Lara
1978	L'Hôtel de la plage	Estelle Delambre	Michel Lang
1979	Écoute voir	Chloé/Moune	Hugo Santiago
1980	Girls	Catherine Flavin	Just Jaeckin
1980	Patrizia	Patricia Cook	Hubert Frank
1981	Pour la peau d'un flic	Charlotte	Alain Delon
1983	Le Battant	Nathalie	Alain Delon
1988	Juillet en septembre	Marie	Sébastien Japrisot
1989	Che ora è?	Loredana	Ettore Scola
1990	La Femme Nikita	Nikita	Luc Besson
1992	Innocent Blood	Marie	John Landis
1993	Map of the Human Heart	Albertine	Vincent Ward
1994	À la folie	Alice	Diane Kurys
1995	Frankie Starlight	Bernadette	Michael Lindsay-Hogg
1996	Passage à l'acte	Isabelle	Francis Girod
1996	Dead Girl	Helen Catherine Howe	Adam Coleman Howard
1998	The Man in the Iron Mask	Queen Mother Anne of Austria	Randall Wallace
1998	Shattered Image	Jessie Markham	Raúl Ruiz
1999	Une pour toutes	Olga Duclos	Claude Lelouch
2002	Gangsters	Nina Delgado	Olivier Marchal
2002	Sex Is Comedy	Jeanne	Catherine Breillat
2004	Deadlines	Julia Müller	Ludi Boeken and Michael A. Lerner
2004	Promised Land	Anne	Amos Gitai
2005	Tout pour plaire	Florence	Cécile Telerman
2007	Demandez la permission aux enfants	Anna Sebag	Éric Civanyan
2007	Une vieille maîtresse	Mme de Solcy	Catherine Breillat
2009	L'imbroglio nel lenzuolo	Beatrice	Alfonso Arau
2010	In Their Sleep	Sarah	Caroline Du Potet and Eric Du Potet
2010	La marquise des ombres	Madame de Brinvilliers	
2012	What the Day Owes the Night	Madame Cazenave	
2025	Ballerina (2025 film)	Prague Concierge (cameo cut from the theatrical release)	Len Wiseman

== Awards ==
- César Award for Best Actress in 1991 for La Femme Nikita
- David di Donatello Awards for Best Foreign Actress in 1991 for La Femme Nikita
- Paris Film Festival for Best Actress in 2004 for Deadlines
- Tokyo International Film Festival for Special Mention in 1993 for Map of the Human Heart
