= La Femme Nikita (film) =

1990 film by Luc Besson

- French theatrical release poster
- French: Nikita
- Directed by: Luc Besson
- Written by: Luc Besson
- Produced by: Patrice Ledoux
- Starring: Anne Parillaud; Jean-Hugues Anglade; Tchéky Karyo; Jeanne Moreau; Jean Bouise; Jean Reno; Philippe Leroy-Beaulieu; Roland Blanche; Jacques Boudet
- Cinematography: Thierry Arbogast
- Edited by: Olivier Mauffroy
- Music by: Éric Serra
- Production companies: Gaumont; Les Films Du Loup; Cecchi Gori Group Tiger Cinematografica
- Distributed by: Gaumont Distribution (France); Penta Distribuzione (Italy)
- Release dates: 21 February 1990 (France); 17 August 1990 (Italy)
- Running time: 117 minutes
- Countries: France; Italy
- Language: French
- Budget: 39 million F (€ 5.6 million)

La Femme Nikita, (Note: French pronunciation: [la fam nikita], literally "The Woman Nikita") released as Nikita in France, is a 1990 French-language action thriller film written and directed by Luc Besson. The film stars Anne Parillaud as the title character, a criminal who is convicted and sentenced to life imprisonment for murdering a policeman during the armed robbery of a pharmacy. Her government handlers fake her death and recruit her as a professional assassin. After intense training, she starts a career as a killer, in which she struggles to balance her work with her personal life.

Besson has said that he wrote Nikita with Parillaud, then his romantic partner, in mind. The film was considered a surprise hit. Roger Ebert called it a "smart, hard-edged, psycho-romantic thriller" in his review. Janet Maslin wrote in The New York Times: "La Femme Nikita combines hip violence, punk anomie, lavish settings and an old-fashioned paean to the power of love."

It was remade as Black Cat (1991) in Hong Kong, Point of No Return (1993) in Hollywood, and in Bollywood as Kartoos (1999). Two English-language television series were produced based on the film, La Femme Nikita (1997–2001) and Nikita (2010–2013).

== Plot ==
Nikita is a feral, vicious and ruthless junkie (drug addict). One night, she participates in the robbery of a pharmacy owned by a friend's parents. The robbery erupts into a gunfight with local police, and her accomplices are killed. Suffering severe withdrawal symptoms, she murders a police officer. Nikita is arrested, tried, and convicted of murder, and is sentenced to life in prison.

In prison, government officials fake her death, making it appear that she has committed suicide, and remove her from prison. She awakens in a nondescript room, where a well-dressed, hard-looking man named Bob tells her that, although officially dead and buried, she is in the custody of a shadowy government agency known as "the Centre" (possibly part of the DGSE). She is given the choice of becoming an assassin or occupying "row 8, plot 30", her fake grave. (Note: As per the original French version/English subtitles) After some resistance, she chooses the former and gradually proves to be a talented killer. She is taught computer skills, martial arts, and use of firearms. One of her trainers, Amande, transforms her from a degenerate drug addict to a femme fatale. Amande implies that she also was rescued and trained by the Centre.

Nikita's initial mission, killing a foreign diplomat in a crowded restaurant and escaping from his well-armed bodyguards to the Centre, doubles as the final test in her training. She graduates and begins life as a sleeper agent in Paris under the name Marie. After meeting a cashier named Marco in a supermarket, the two develop an intimate relationship, although he knows nothing of her real work. Marco is curious about her past and why she has no family or other friends. Nikita invites Bob to dinner as "Uncle Bob". He tells stories about "Marie's" fabricated childhood and gives the couple tickets for a trip to Venice, purportedly as an engagement gift.

Nikita and Marco go on the trip. As they prepare to have sex after arrival, the phone rings. She presumes it is the room service they just ordered, but it is instructions for her next job. Her room is perfectly located for her to shoot the target. She goes to the bathroom pretending to take a bath, and as she prepares the rifle, Marco tries to talk to her through the door. The instructions about her target take longer than expected and she cannot answer him. She finally shoots her target but barely conceals the rifle before Marco walks in, against her wishes. Nikita is distraught that her work has caused them difficulties.

Still, her career as an assassin goes well until a document-theft mission in an embassy goes awry. Back in Paris, the Centre sends in Victor "The Cleaner", a ruthless operative, to salvage the mission and destroy all the evidence of the foul-up. When another operative is killed by Victor, Nikita is assigned to take his place. They nearly complete the mission before it backfires. Victor takes on a group of guards before being fatally wounded, but drives Nikita to safety before succumbing to his wounds.

Marco reveals that he has discovered Nikita's secret life, and, concerned over how her activities are affecting her psychologically, persuades her to disappear. Upon discovering that she has abandoned the Centre, Bob goes to their apartment and meets with Marco. When Bob says that Nikita is at risk because she still has the documents taken from the embassy, Marco hands them over. The two men agree that they will both miss Nikita.

== Cast ==
- Anne Parillaud as Nikita
- Jean-Hugues Anglade as Marco
- Tchéky Karyo as Bob
- Jeanne Moreau as Amande
- Jean Reno as Victor "The Cleaner"
- Roland Blanche as the police interrogator
- Marc Duret as Rico
- Philippe Leroy-Beaulieu as Grossman
- Jacques Boudet as the chemist
- Philippe du Janerand as Ambassador - Jules
- Jean Bouise as the embassy attaché

La Femme Nikita marks the last film role of Bouise, who died a year before its release. The film is dedicated to his memory.

== Production ==
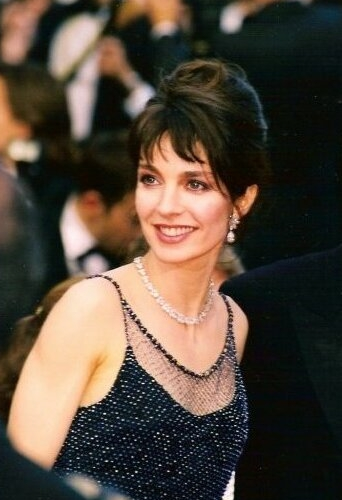
Anne Parillaud stars as Nikita, a young female assassin.

Besson said he wrote the script for Parillaud to star as Nikita, but purposely wrote it against type so people would not say she was playing herself. "Anne is shy, with brown glasses," he told the Los Angeles Times, adding that she is "an intellectual who'd never held a weapon before. I didn't write this part for her, but against her so people wouldn't say she's playing herself. When Anne read the script, she said, 'You see me like this?' 'No,' I said. 'But you pretend to be an actress. Do it.'"

During the film production, Besson and Parillaud, then a couple and parents to their young daughter, Juliette, lived apart. One stayed at home with Juliette, while the other stayed in a hotel. They would switch every couple of weeks. Besson explained: "I needed to love the character of Nikita in order to shoot," he says, "and to come back to the same girl at night and ask her to pass the salt breaks all the magic. This way, there were no fights at night that left us angry the next day. Every morning, it was such a pleasure to see her and film her."

Due to the success of Besson's previous film The Big Blue (1988), Gaumont agreed to finance Nikita without having seen a script. Nikita cost 39 million francs to make, and was a co-production between Besson's company Les Films du Loup, Gaumont, and Cecchi Gori Group Tiger Cinematographica.

== Release ==
Nikita premiered in Paris at the Grand Rex on 21 February 1990. In its first week in Paris, the film had 113,900 spectators. By 2000, the film had 828,867 spectators in Paris.

Following the premiere, the film was distributed to 15 towns in France, with Besson to promote it and have discussions with audiences after the screenings. Other cast and crew members on the tour included Éric Serra, Anne Parillaud, Jean-Hugues Anglade and occasionally Tchéky Karyo. The film had 3,787,845 spectators in France by 2000. It was the second highest-grossing film in France of 1990, but was not as popular as Besson's The Big Blue.

After Nikita's release in France, it was released in over 95 countries. Gaumont handled the sales of distribution rights separately; distribution rights were sold to Columbia Pictures and the remake rights were sold to Warner Bros. Nikita was shown in Montreal, Canada, in 1990. The film was very popular in Montreal, where distributor Didier Farre noted that the film was beaten only by Bird on a Wire and Back to the Future Part III in June 1990. In Britain, the film became the highest weekly box office ever for a French film, and it was also popular at the box office in Italy and Japan.

It was released in the United States in 1991. The film had a six-month theatrical run in the United States where it reached an audience of 1.15 million. It was considered a surprise hit, or "a fairytale", as Besson said. By the end of the year, Nikita was the third highest-grossing French film in the United States. Besson thought that the film was inappropriately promoted in the United States, saying that "Nikita is an action film but was released in American art houses. The Big Blue has the same problem, released in the United States as an intellectual work, and attracting the wrong audience."

== Reception ==
Susan Hayward described the press reception to the film as being mixed. Monthly film journals were more favourable, while the more serious journals were predominantly negative. Reviews from Le Nouvel Observateur, Libération, Le Figaro and Le Journal du Dimanche gave the film positive reviews, where they all appreciated Besson's film noir-styled film and were surprised at Parillaud's acting in a demanding role. In contrast, the film was dismissed in reviews from L'Humanité, L'événement du jeudi, Le Monde, Le Parisien, and La Croix, who found the film resembled a commercial advertisement visually and psychologically had the depth of a comic strip.

Speaking of the film's critical reception in France, Besson noted he would not talk to the press, saying he would want to "count on them to help me, to help me evaluate my own work". He noted that "critics should be looking towards the future, but in France, all they want to talk about is the past."

Besson further said:

I don't have much belief in the sincerity of critics, I believe in the sincerity of someone who goes to a film, pays his ticket and comes out saying what he thinks because he has nothing to gain by doing so. The critics defend an ideology, their age, their profession, a lot of things that don't interest me.

Paris critic Marc Esposito of Studio responded to Besson's statements, describing Besson as someone who "thinks he's a nice guy, and everyone around him is evil. We are all guilty of not adoring Luc Besson."

The film received favourable reviews outside France.

On the review aggregator website Rotten Tomatoes, the film holds an approval rating of 89% based on 47 reviews. The website's critics consensus reads, "A zany out-of-control thriller that gives lead Anne Parillaud a big character arc and plenty of emotional room to work in." Metacritic, which uses a weighted average, assigned the film a score of 65 out of 100, based on 16 critics, indicating "generally favorable" reviews. A number of prominent American critics gave the film positive reviews, including Gene Siskel and Roger Ebert. In his print review for The Chicago Sun-Times, Ebert wrote how the film "begins with the materials of a violent thriller but transcends them with the story of the heroine’s transformation. It is a surprisingly touching movie."

== Accolades ==
The film was nominated for the Golden Globe Award for Best Foreign Language Film. Parillaud won the César Award for Best Actress and the David di Donatello Award for Best Foreign Actress in 1991. Marc Duret was nominated for a César Award for Most Promising Actor for his portrayal of Rico.

== Aftermath and influence ==
When asked about a follow-up to Nikita, Anne Parillaud said that she was not interested in a sequel. She said: "If the film was a failure, would you have had anything more to say about her? No. Of course not."

=== Remakes ===
La Femme Nikita was remade in Hong Kong as the action film Black Cat directed by Stephen Shin in 1991.

It was remade in Hollywood as Point of No Return by John Badham in 1993. This was part of a trend in the late 1980s and early 1990s for Hollywood to remake French films. Daily Variety noted that between 1987 and 1993, Hollywood remade seventeen contemporary French films, which had been released in the 1970s, 1980s, and 1990s. The remakes were generally initiated by the French films and, given the size of the American market, often make more money for their directors as American adaptations than they do as original films in France.

=== TV series ===
A Canadian TV series based on the film, titled La Femme Nikita, premiered in 1997. It was produced in Canada by Fireworks Entertainment. The developer Joel Surnow, who described himself as "devotee of Besson's film", has repeatedly said in interviews that the series is modelled explicitly after Besson's film and not the American remake. He said that he had never seen Point of No Return.

The premiere episode of the series borrows scenes from Besson's film, with Variety noting that it was a scene-by-scene re-creation of the kitchen restaurant scene. Several lead roles in the series parallel those of the film: Roy Dupuis plays Nikita's trainer Michael, who was called Bob in Besson's film, and Alberta Watson is Madeline, who is similar to the character played by Jeanne Moreau in Besson's film.

In 2010, The CW picked up a new series, Nikita, with Maggie Q as a Nikita who has gone rogue.

=== Influences ===
Other films that La Femme Nikita has influenced include The Villainess (2017), a South Korean film.

== See also ==
- Léon: The Professional
- Girls with guns
- List of assassinations in fiction
- List of neo-noir films
